= 2015 Tour de Romandie =

Cycling race

2015 UCI World Tour, race 14 of 28

Race details
- Dates: 28 April – 3 May 2015
- Stages: 6
- Distance: 709.6 km (440.9 mi)
- Winning time: 18h 36' 30"

Results
Jersey awarded to the overall winner	Winner	Ilnur Zakarin (RUS)	(Team Katusha)
	Second	Simon Špilak (SLO)	(Team Katusha)
	Third	Chris Froome (GBR)	(Team Sky)
Jersey awarded to the mountains classification winner	Mountains	Maxim Belkov (RUS)	(Team Katusha)
Jersey awarded to the youth classification winner	Youth	Thibaut Pinot (FRA)	(FDJ)
Jersey awarded to the sprints classification winner	Sprints	Maxim Belkov (RUS)	(Team Katusha)
	Team	Team Katusha	

The 2015 Tour de Romandie was the 69th edition of the Tour de Romandie stage race. It took place from 28 April to 3 May and was the fourteenth race of the 2015 UCI World Tour. The race took place in the Romandy region of Switzerland, starting in Lac de Joux and finishing in Lausanne. The race included six stages, with a team time trial at the beginning and an individual time trial at the end with four hilly or mountainous stages in between. The queen stage was the fifth stage, which finished on the climb above Champex.

The defending champion was Chris Froome (Team Sky), who won both the 2013 and 2014 editions. The race was won by Ilnur Zakarin of Team Katusha.

== Teams ==
The Tour de Romandie was part of the UCI World Tour, which meant that all 17 UCI WorldTeams were automatically invited and obliged to send a team. The race organisers also invited UCI Professional Continental team Team Europcar as a wildcard, to make a peloton of 18 teams. Each team entered eight riders (the maximum permitted), so 144 riders started the first stage.

UCI WorldTeams

- AG2R La Mondiale
- Astana
- BMC Racing Team
- Etixx–Quick-Step
- FDJ
- IAM Cycling
- Lampre–Merida
- Lotto–Soudal
- Movistar Team
- Orica–GreenEDGE
- Cannondale–Garmin
- Team Giant–Alpecin
- Team Katusha
- LottoNL–Jumbo
- Team Sky
- Tinkoff–Saxo
- Trek Factory Racing

UCI Professional Continental teams

- Team Europcar

== Race route ==
The race included six stages over six days. The first stage was a 19.2-kilometre (11.9-mile) team time trial; this was a change from recent editions of the Tour de Romandie, which started with a prologue individual time trial. The team time trial was important both for its role in the general classification and also because the teams were using it as preparation for a similar stage in the Tour de France. Stages 2, 3 and 4 were all hilly but were expected to end in sprints. The final two stages were expected to be the decisive ones in the general classification: the fifth stage included several climbs and a summit finish at Champex and the sixth stage was a 17.3-kilometre (10.7-mile) individual time trial around Lausanne.

Stage	Date	Course	Distance	Type	Winner
1	28 April	Lac de Joux to Juraparc de Vallorbe	19.2 km (11.9 mi)	Team time trial	Team Sky
2	29 April	Apples to Saint-Imier	168.1 km (104.5 mi)	Medium-mountain stage	Michael Albasini (SUI)
3	30 April	Moutier to Porrentruy	172.5 km (107.2 mi)	Hilly stage	Michael Albasini (SUI)
4	1 May	La Neuveville to Fribourg	169.8 km (105.5 mi)	Hilly stage	Stefan Küng (SUI)
5	2 May	Fribourg to Champex	162.7 km (101.1 mi)	Mountain stage	Thibaut Pinot (FRA)
6	3 May	Lausanne to Lausanne	17.3 km (10.7 mi)	Individual time trial	Tony Martin (GER)

== Pre-race favourites ==
The principal favourite for the race was Chris Froome (Team Sky). Froome was the defending champion, having won both the 2013 and 2014 editions. Sky had also won in 2012 with Bradley Wiggins. Froome's form, however, was uncertain. He had shown good form early in the season by beating Alberto Contador at the Vuelta a Andalucía, but afterwards fell ill. He withdrew from Tirreno–Adriatico, then performed poorly in the Volta a Catalunya. He returned to racing the week before the Tour de Romandie in La Flèche Wallonne, but crashed towards the end of the race. Although he was able to finish the race, Froome had lost some skin in the crash. L'Équipe described him as "in need of reassurance" following his "chaotic start to the season".

The other principal favourites ahead of the race were Nairo Quintana (Movistar Team), who had won Tirreno–Adriatico earlier in the season, and Vincenzo Nibali (Astana), the reigning Tour de France champion. Quintana had recently finished in fourth place in the Tour of the Basque Country and was seen as a particular threat in the mountains. Nibali, meanwhile, had ridden aggressively in the Ardennes classics but had not won a race since the previous July; L'Équipe described him as "in search of a convincing result in 2015". Other favourites included Nibali's teammate Jakob Fuglsang, Simon Špilak (Team Katusha), Rigoberto Urán (Etixx–Quick-Step), Rui Costa (Lampre–Merida), Thibaut Pinot (FDJ), Simon Yates (Orica–GreenEDGE) and Mathias Frank (IAM Cycling).

== Stages ==
=== Stage 1 ===
28 April 2015 – Vallée de Joux to Juraparc de Vallorbe, 19.2 km (11.9 mi), team time trial (TTT)

The first stage of the race was a 19.2-kilometre (11.9-mile) team time trial. In this event, each team set off together; the team's time was that of the fifth rider across the finish line. The riders who arrived at the same time as the fifth rider or before him were credited with the team's time; riders who arrived after the fifth rider were credited with their actual arrival time. The teams set off at five-minute intervals: Team Europcar set off first at 15:45 and Team Sky set off last at 17:10. The start line was at the south-western end of the Lac de Joux in Le Sentier; the riders first headed south-west for about 2.5 kilometres (1.6 miles), then turned north-east. The course went through L'Orient, then continued along the southern coast of the lake through L'Abbaye and Le Pont at the northern end of the lake. The course to this point had been generally flat, but the last 3 kilometres (1.9 miles) of the course included the climb of the Col du Mont d'Orzeires and the descent to the finish line in the Juraparc de Vallorbe.

As they set off first, Team Europcar set the first benchmark time of 22' 26" at an average speed of 51.4 km/h (31.9 mph). LottoNL–Jumbo, the next team to set off, moved ahead of them by 12 seconds; this time was immediately beaten by Cannondale–Garmin who set a time of 21' 59" at an average speed of 52.4 km/h (32.6 mph). Cannondale–Garmin's lead lasted some time as the next six teams to set off were all slower. After half of the eighteen teams had finished, they held a one-second lead over Lampre–Merida. The tenth team to set off was Orica–GreenEDGE, who set a time 40 seconds faster than Cannondale–Garmin. The team had five riders together (the minimum permitted) as they crossed the line, with the Swiss Michael Albasini crossing the line first.

The final teams to set off included the world champions in the team time trial, BMC Racing Team, and the former world champions, Etixx–Quick-Step. None of the next seven teams were able to beat Orica–GreenEDGE's time and, with one team left to finish, they still led by 5 seconds ahead of Team Katusha. The final team to set off was Team Sky; they set an identical time at the intermediate checkpoint; at the end of the stage Team Sky won by 0.6 seconds. Geraint Thomas was the first rider across the line and so was the first leader of the race; he had previously worn the yellow jersey in the 2012 Tour de Romandie. Luke Rowe was the best young rider after the first stage, while 11 riders shared the same time as Thomas.

Stage 1 result
Rank	Team	Time
1	Team Sky	21' 19"
2	Orica–GreenEDGE	+ 0"
3	Team Katusha	+ 5"
4	Etixx–Quick-Step	+ 14"
5	Astana	+ 17"
6	BMC Racing Team	+ 19"
7	FDJ	+ 22"
8	IAM Cycling	+ 24"
9	Cannondale–Garmin	+ 40"
10	Movistar Team	+ 40"

General classification after stage 1
Rank	Rider	Team	Time
1	Geraint Thomas (GBR)	Team Sky	21' 19"
2	Elia Viviani (ITA)	Team Sky	+ 0"
3	Ian Stannard (GBR)	Team Sky	+ 0"
4	Luke Rowe (GBR)	Team Sky	+ 0"
5	Chris Froome (GBR)	Team Sky	+ 0"
6	Peter Kennaugh (GBR)	Team Sky	+ 0"
7	Michael Albasini (SUI)	Orica–GreenEDGE	+ 0"
8	Simon Gerrans (AUS)	Orica–GreenEDGE	+ 0"
9	Svein Tuft (CAN)	Orica–GreenEDGE	+ 0"
10	Ivan Santaromita (ITA)	Orica–GreenEDGE	+ 0"

=== Stage 2 ===
29 April 2015 – Apples to Saint-Imier, 168.1 km (104.5 mi)

Stage 2 result
Rank	Rider	Team	Time
1	Michael Albasini (SUI)	Orica–GreenEDGE	4h 21' 43"
2	Jarlinson Pantano (COL)	IAM Cycling	+ 0"
3	Julian Alaphilippe (FRA)	Etixx–Quick-Step	+ 0"
4	Nathan Haas (AUS)	Cannondale–Garmin	+ 0"
5	Rui Costa (POR)	Lampre–Merida	+ 0"
6	Damiano Caruso (ITA)	BMC Racing Team	+ 0"
7	Ilnur Zakarin (RUS)	Team Katusha	+ 0"
8	Ivan Santaromita (ITA)	Orica–GreenEDGE	+ 0"
9	Jan Bakelants (BEL)	AG2R La Mondiale	+ 0"
10	Ramūnas Navardauskas (LIT)	Cannondale–Garmin	+ 0"

General classification after stage 2
Rank	Rider	Team	Time
1	Michael Albasini (SUI)	Orica–GreenEDGE	4h 42' 52"
2	Ivan Santaromita (ITA)	Orica–GreenEDGE	+ 10"
3	Chris Froome (GBR)	Team Sky	+ 10"
4	Simon Yates (GBR)	Orica–GreenEDGE	+ 10"
5	Ilnur Zakarin (RUS)	Team Katusha	+ 15"
6	Pavel Kochetkov (RUS)	Team Katusha	+ 15"
7	Egor Silin (RUS)	Team Katusha	+ 15"
8	Yuri Trofimov (RUS)	Team Katusha	+ 15"
9	Simon Špilak (SLO)	Team Katusha	+ 15"
10	Julian Alaphilippe (FRA)	Etixx–Quick-Step	+ 20"

=== Stage 3 ===
30 April 2015 – Moutier to Porrentruy, 172.5 km (107.2 mi)

Stage 3 result
Rank	Rider	Team	Time
1	Michael Albasini (SUI)	Orica–GreenEDGE	4h 14' 56"
2	Julian Alaphilippe (FRA)	Etixx–Quick-Step	+ 0"
3	Damiano Caruso (ITA)	BMC Racing Team	+ 0"
4	Rui Costa (POR)	Lampre–Merida	+ 0"
5	Simon Gerrans (AUS)	Orica–GreenEDGE	+ 0"
6	Nathan Haas (AUS)	Cannondale–Garmin	+ 0"
7	Rigoberto Urán (COL)	Etixx–Quick-Step	+ 0"
8	Ramūnas Navardauskas (LIT)	Cannondale–Garmin	+ 0"
9	Luka Mezgec (SLO)	Team Giant–Alpecin	+ 0"
10	Sergey Chernetskiy (RUS)	Team Katusha	+ 0"

General classification after stage 3
Rank	Rider	Team	Time
1	Michael Albasini (SUI)	Orica–GreenEDGE	8h 57' 38"
2	Ivan Santaromita (ITA)	Orica–GreenEDGE	+ 20"
3	Chris Froome (GBR)	Team Sky	+ 20"
4	Simon Yates (GBR)	Orica–GreenEDGE	+ 20"
5	Julian Alaphilippe (FRA)	Etixx–Quick-Step	+ 24"
6	Ilnur Zakarin (RUS)	Team Katusha	+ 25"
7	Pavel Kochetkov (RUS)	Team Katusha	+ 25"
8	Yuri Trofimov (RUS)	Team Katusha	+ 25"
9	Egor Silin (RUS)	Team Katusha	+ 25"
10	Simon Špilak (SLO)	Team Katusha	+ 25"

=== Stage 4 ===
1 May 2015 – La Neuveville to Fribourg, 169.8 km (105.5 mi)

Stage 4 result
Rank	Rider	Team	Time
1	Stefan Küng (SUI)	BMC Racing Team	4h 35' 10"
2	Jan Bakelants (BEL)	AG2R La Mondiale	+ 38"
3	Bert-Jan Lindeman (NED)	LottoNL–Jumbo	+ 39"
4	Tony Martin (GER)	Etixx–Quick-Step	+ 45"
5	Gianni Meersman (BEL)	Etixx–Quick-Step	+ 52"
6	Tosh Van der Sande (BEL)	Lotto–Soudal	+ 52"
7	Johannes Fröhlinger (GER)	Team Giant–Alpecin	+ 52"
8	Michael Albasini (SUI)	Orica–GreenEDGE	+ 52"
9	Simon Yates (GBR)	Orica–GreenEDGE	+ 52"
10	Ivan Santaromita (ITA)	Orica–GreenEDGE	+ 52"

General classification after stage 4
Rank	Rider	Team	Time
1	Michael Albasini (SUI)	Orica–GreenEDGE	13h 33' 40"
2	Ivan Santaromita (ITA)	Orica–GreenEDGE	+ 20"
3	Chris Froome (GBR)	Team Sky	+ 20"
4	Simon Yates (GBR)	Orica–GreenEDGE	+ 20"
5	Ilnur Zakarin (RUS)	Team Katusha	+ 25"
6	Egor Silin (RUS)	Team Katusha	+ 25"
7	Yuri Trofimov (RUS)	Team Katusha	+ 25"
8	Simon Špilak (SLO)	Team Katusha	+ 25"
9	Tony Martin (GER)	Etixx–Quick-Step	+ 27"
10	Rigoberto Urán (COL)	Etixx–Quick-Step	+ 34"

=== Stage 5 ===
2 May 2015 – Fribourg to Champex, 162.7 km (101.1 mi)

Stage 5 result
Rank	Rider	Team	Time
1	Thibaut Pinot (FRA)	FDJ	4h 38' 54"
2	Ilnur Zakarin (RUS)	Team Katusha	+ 7"
3	Romain Bardet (FRA)	AG2R La Mondiale	+ 20"
4	Nairo Quintana (COL)	Movistar Team	+ 20"
5	Simon Špilak (SLO)	Team Katusha	+ 20"
6	Rafał Majka (POL)	Tinkoff–Saxo	+ 20"
7	Chris Froome (GBR)	Team Sky	+ 20"
8	Rigoberto Urán (COL)	Etixx–Quick-Step	+ 53"
9	Vincenzo Nibali (ITA)	Astana	+ 53"
10	Michele Scarponi (ITA)	Astana	+ 53"

General classification after stage 5
Rank	Rider	Team	Time
1	Ilnur Zakarin (RUS)	Team Katusha	18h 13' 00"
2	Thibaut Pinot (FRA)	FDJ	+ 6"
3	Chris Froome (GBR)	Team Sky	+ 14"
4	Simon Špilak (SLO)	Team Katusha	+ 19"
5	Nairo Quintana (COL)	Movistar Team	+ 54"
6	Rigoberto Urán (COL)	Etixx–Quick-Step	+ 1' 01"
7	Simon Yates (GBR)	Orica–GreenEDGE	+ 1' 01"
8	Vincenzo Nibali (ITA)	Astana	+ 1' 04"
9	Michele Scarponi (ITA)	Astana	+ 1' 04"
10	Yuri Trofimov (RUS)	Team Katusha	+ 1' 06"

=== Stage 6 ===
3 May 2015 – Lausanne to Lausanne, 17.3 km (10.7 mi), individual time trial (ITT)

Stage 6 result
Rank	Rider	Team	Time
1	Tony Martin (GER)	Etixx–Quick-Step	23' 17"
2	Simon Špilak (SLO)	Team Katusha	+ 11"
3	Ilnur Zakarin (RUS)	Team Katusha	+ 13"
4	Jurgen Van den Broeck (BEL)	Lotto–Soudal	+ 19"
5	Rohan Dennis (AUS)	BMC Racing Team	+ 22"
6	Romain Bardet (FRA)	AG2R La Mondiale	+ 24"
7	Jonathan Castroviejo (ESP)	Movistar Team	+ 25"
8	Stef Clement (NED)	IAM Cycling	+ 26"
9	Rafał Majka (POL)	Tinkoff–Saxo	+ 28"
10	Steve Morabito (SUI)	FDJ	+ 31"

General classification after stage 6
Rank	Rider	Team	Time
1	Ilnur Zakarin (RUS)	Team Katusha	18h 36' 30"
2	Simon Špilak (SLO)	Team Katusha	+ 17"
3	Chris Froome (GBR)	Team Sky	+ 35"
4	Thibaut Pinot (FRA)	FDJ	+ 49"
5	Rigoberto Urán (COL)	Etixx–Quick-Step	+ 1' 20"
6	Simon Yates (GBR)	Orica–GreenEDGE	+ 1' 21"
7	Rafał Majka (POL)	Tinkoff–Saxo	+ 1' 24"
8	Nairo Quintana (COL)	Movistar Team	+ 1' 42"
9	Romain Bardet (FRA)	AG2R La Mondiale	+ 1' 43"
10	Vincenzo Nibali (ITA)	Astana	+ 1' 54"

== Classification leadership table ==
In the 2015 Tour de Romandie, four jerseys were awarded. The general classification was calculated by adding up each cyclist's finishing times on each stage. Time bonuses were awarded to the first three finishers on road stages (stages 2–5): the stage winner won a ten-second bonus, with six and four seconds for the second and third riders respectively. No bonus seconds were awarded at intermediate sprints. The leader of the general classification received a yellow jersey. This classification was considered the most important of the Tour, and the winner of the classification was considered the winner of the race. The young rider classification was based on the general classification: the highest-ranked rider born after 1 January 1990 was the leader of the classification and wore a white jersey.

There was a mountains classification; the leader of this competition wore a pink jersey. Over the road stages of the race, there were 15 classified climbs, each of which was ranked as first-category, second-category or third-category. The first riders to cross the summit of the climbs won points towards the mountain classification. On first-category climbs, the first five riders won points with the first of these winning 12 points. Points were also awarded to the first five riders across the summit of second-category climbs, though the winner only won 8 points. On third-category climbs, only the first four riders won points, with the first rider winning five points. There was also a sprints classification. On each of the road stages, there were two intermediate sprints. The first rider in these sprints won 6 points; the second rider won 3 points; the third rider won 1 point. No points were awarded at stage finishes. The winner of the classification won a green jersey.

The final individual classification was a combativity prize. After each road stage, a jury chose the rider on the basis of sportsmanship and effort in the stage. The rider was awarded a red dossard (race number) for the following stage. After the final stage, the jury chose the most combative rider of the race overall.

The final classification was a team classification. This was calculated by adding together the times of the best three riders on each team in each stage except the team time trial. In this stage, the team's finishing time was that of the fifth rider across the line.

Stage	Winner	General classification	Sprint classification	Mountains classification	Young rider classification	Combativity prize	Team classification
1	Team Sky	Geraint Thomas	Not awarded	Not awarded	Luke Rowe	Not awarded	Team Sky
2	Michael Albasini	Michael Albasini	Jonathan Fumeaux	Maxim Belkov	Simon Yates	Jonathan Fumeaux	Orica–GreenEDGE
3	Michael Albasini	Michael Albasini	Jonathan Fumeaux	Maxim Belkov	Simon Yates	Kristof Vandewalle	Orica–GreenEDGE
4	Stefan Küng	Michael Albasini	Jonathan Fumeaux	Maxim Belkov	Simon Yates	Stefan Küng	BMC Racing Team
5	Thibaut Pinot	Ilnur Zakarin	Maxim Belkov	Maxim Belkov	Thibaut Pinot	Maxim Belkov	Team Katusha
6	Tony Martin	Ilnur Zakarin	Maxim Belkov	Maxim Belkov	Thibaut Pinot	Not awarded	Team Katusha
Final		Ilnur Zakarin	Maxim Belkov	Maxim Belkov	Thibaut Pinot	Stefan Küng	Team Katusha

== Classification standings ==
=== General classification ===
Final general classification (1–10)
Rank	Rider	Team	Time
1	Ilnur Zakarin (RUS)	Team Katusha	18h 36' 30"
2	Simon Špilak (SLO)	Team Katusha	+ 17"
3	Chris Froome (GBR)	Team Sky	+ 35"
4	Thibaut Pinot (FRA)	FDJ	+ 49"
5	Rigoberto Urán (COL)	Etixx–Quick-Step	+ 1' 20"
6	Simon Yates (GBR)	Orica–GreenEDGE	+ 1' 21"
7	Rafał Majka (POL)	Tinkoff–Saxo	+ 1' 24"
8	Nairo Quintana (COL)	Movistar Team	+ 1' 42"
9	Romain Bardet (FRA)	AG2R La Mondiale	+ 1' 43"
10	Vincenzo Nibali (ITA)	Astana	+ 1' 54"

=== Mountains classification ===
Final mountains classification (1–10)
Rank	Rider	Team	Points
1	Maxim Belkov	Team Katusha	59
2	Nairo Quintana (COL)	Movistar Team	22
3	Jan Bakelants (BEL)	AG2R La Mondiale	17
4	Bryan Nauleau (FRA)	Team Europcar	16
5	Pavel Kochetkov	Team Katusha	15
6	Jonathan Fumeaux (SWI)	IAM Cycling	15
7	Thibaut Pinot (FRA)	FDJ	13
8	Kristof Vandewalle (BEL)	Trek Factory Racing	11
9	Brian Bulgaç (NED)	LottoNL–Jumbo	11
10	Stefan Küng (SWI)	BMC Racing Team	10

=== Young rider classification ===
Final young rider classification (1–10)
Rank	Rider	Team	Time
1	Thibaut Pinot (FRA)	FDJ	18h 37' 19"
2	Simon Yates (GBR)	Orica–GreenEDGE	+ 32"
3	Nairo Quintana (COL)	Movistar Team	+ 53"
4	Romain Bardet (FRA)	AG2R La Mondiale	+ 54"
5	Rohan Dennis (AUS)	BMC Racing Team	+ 9' 51"
6	Paweł Poljański (POL)	Tinkoff–Saxo	+ 10' 15"
7	Jesper Hansen (DEN)	Tinkoff–Saxo	+ 21' 06"
8	Tsgabu Grmay (ETH)	Lampre–Merida	+ 24' 02"
9	Manuel Senni (ITA)	BMC Racing Team	+ 28' 11"
10	Tobias Ludvigsson (SWE)	Team Giant–Alpecin	+ 33' 54"

=== Team classification ===
Final team classification (1–10)
Rank	Team	Time
1	Team Katusha	55h 08' 54"
2	(Kazakhstan) Astana	+ 4' 21"
3	Tinkoff–Saxo	+ 7' 56"
4	(Switzerland) IAM Cycling	+ 8' 41"
5	(Spain) Movistar Team	+ 11' 28"
6	(United States) BMC Racing Team	+ 14' 34"
7	(Belgium) Lotto–Soudal	+ 17' 05"
8	(France) FDJ	+ 17' 17"
9	(United States) Cannondale–Garmin	+ 17' 50"
10	(France) AG2R La Mondiale	+ 17' 56"
