= Lac Brenet =

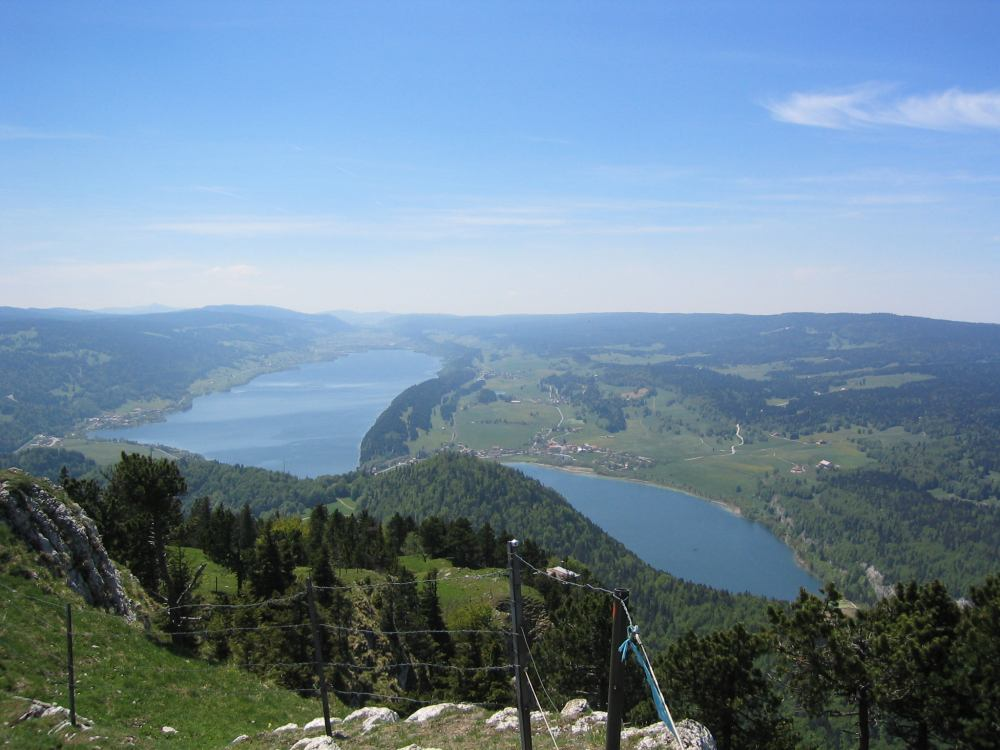
- Vallée de Joux with Lac de Joux to the left and Lac Brenet to the right

- Location within Canton of Vaud Location within Switzerland Location within Alps
- Interactive map of Lac Brenet
- Location: Vaud
- Coordinates: 46°40′23″N 6°19′24″E
- Type: natural lake, reservoir
- Primary outflows: underground
- Max. length: 1.5 km (0.93 mi)
- Max. width: 500 m (1,600 ft)
- Surface area: 0.80 km^{2} (0.31 sq mi)
- Max. depth: 18 m (59 ft)
- Surface elevation: 1,002 m (3,287 ft)

Lac Brenet (French pronunciation: [lak bʁənɛ]) is a lake in the Vallée de Joux, canton of Vaud, Switzerland. It is located north of the Lac de Joux, only 200 metres away. Its elevation of 1002 metres is 2 metres below that of Lac de Joux.

The lake used to drain naturally underground and the water resurfaced at the source of the Orbe River. Today the lake is used as a reservoir of the hydroelectric plant at Vallorbe.

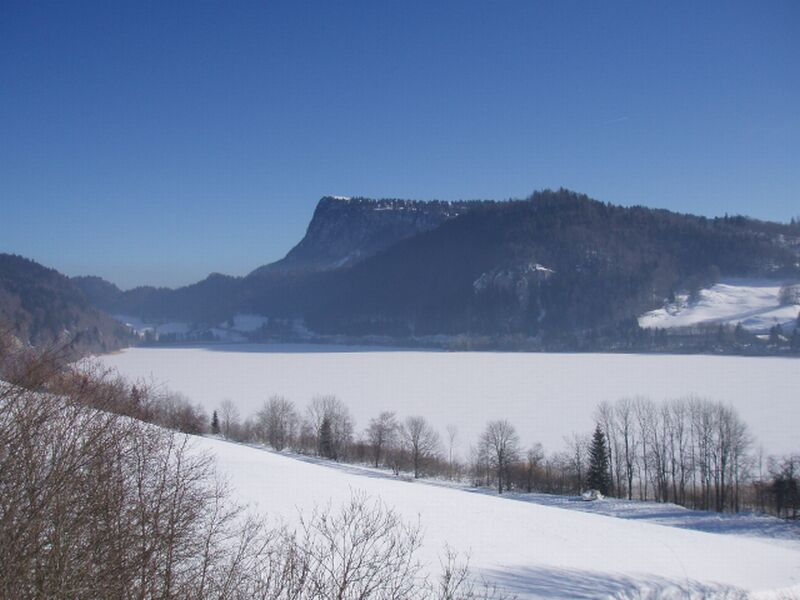
Frozen Lac Brenet with Dent de Vaulion

Lac Brenet

== See also ==
- List of lakes of Switzerland
- List of mountain lakes of Switzerland
