= Lemania =

Swiss watch manufacturer

Lemania Watch Co.
- Formerly: Lugrin SA
- Industry: Watch movement manufacturing
- Founded: 1884, L'Orient, Switzerland
- Founder: Alfred Lugrin
- Brands: Nouvelle Lemania
- Parent: The Swatch Group Ltd.

Lemania was a Swiss watch manufacturer and manufacturer of watch movements.

== History ==
It was founded in 1884 by Alfred Lugrin (1858-1920), who had trained at Jaeger-LeCoultre. Lugrin received awards and gold medals at exhibitions in Milan in 1906 and in Bern in 1914. Until 1930, the factory was called Lugrin SA, until Lugrin's son-in-law Marius Meylan established the firm Lemania Watch Co., based in L'Orient, Switzerland (Vaud).

In 1932, Lemania, Omega and Tissot merged to form the SSIH group.

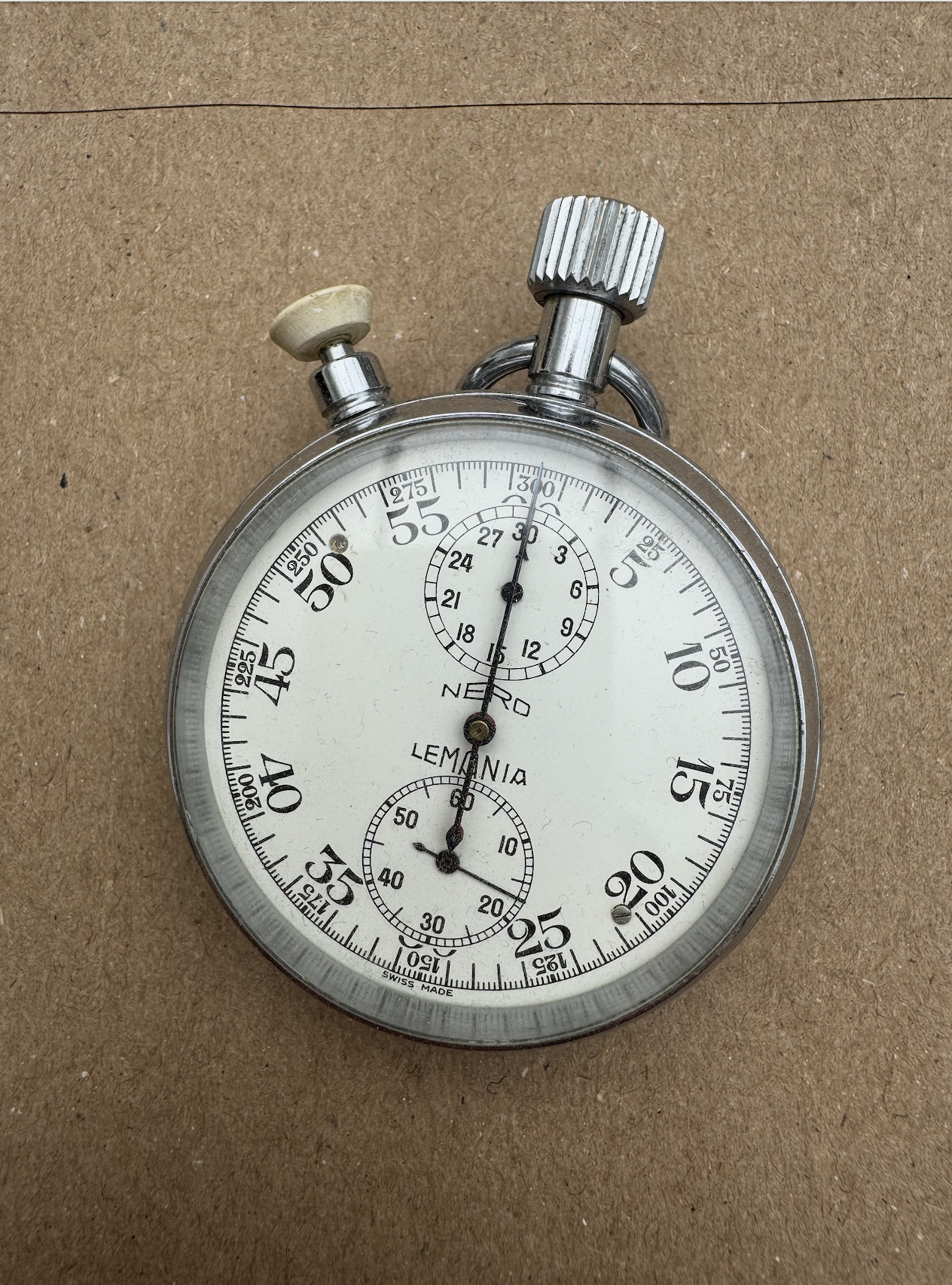
Nero Lemania stopwatch

=== Omega Speedmaster ===
The Omega Speedmaster used a chronograph movement developed by Lemania, first developed in 1946 by Albert Piguet, the caliber 27. This later became the Omega Caliber 321.

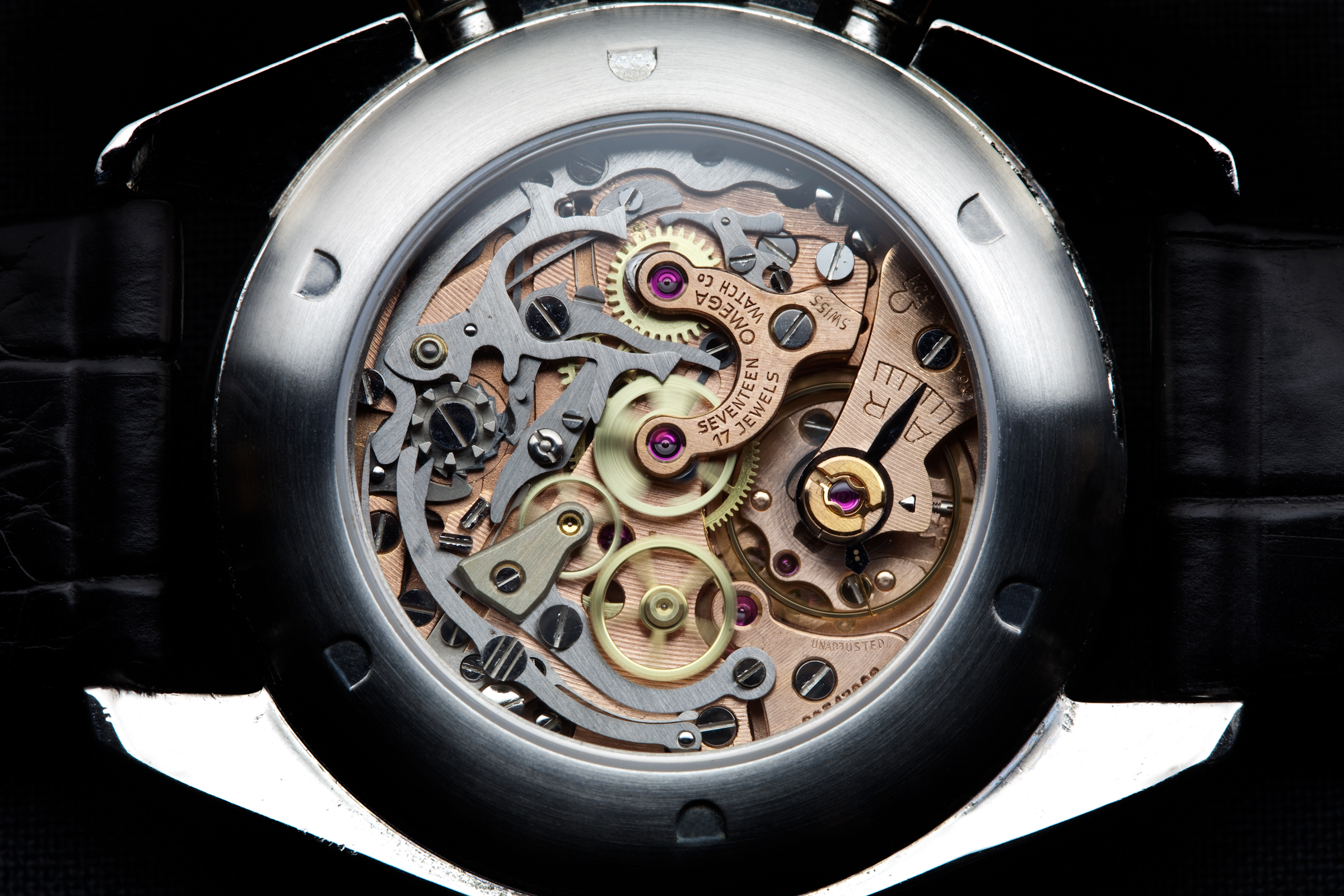
A Lemania-derived Omega Cal. 321 movement used in the Omega Speedmaster

An Omega Speedmaster featuring this movement was worn by Buzz Aldrin on the first moon landings in 1969.

=== Nouvelle Lemania ===
With the advent of electronic watches in the 1970s, sales of mechanical watches from the SSIH Group collapsed. In 1980, creditor banks gave Nicolas Hayek the task of restructuring the group. In the course of a management buyout, Lemania separated from the SSIH Group in 1981 and changed its name to Nouvelle Lemania.

=== Swatch Group ===
In 1992, Nouvelle Lemania was bought by Breguet. In 1999, the Swatch Group acquired Breguet, along with Nouvelle Lemania. Since 2003, Lemania has exclusively provided watch movements to members of the Swatch Group.

== Notable wearers ==
Sir Winston Churchill wore a 36 mm 18K gold Lemania chronograph gifted to him from the town of Canton de Vaud in 1946.
