= Lac des Rousses =

Lake in France

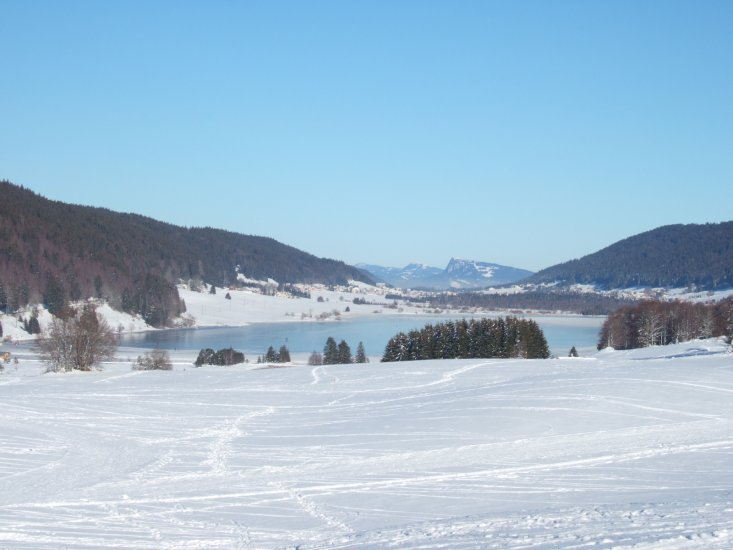

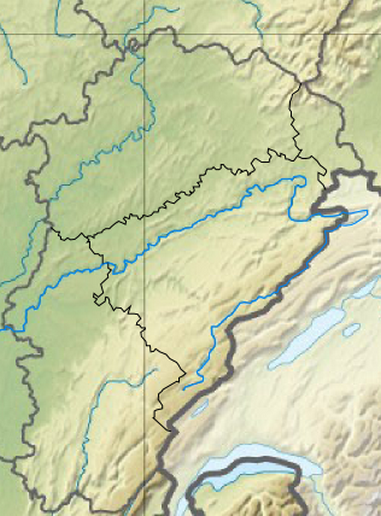
- Location within Franche-Comté
- Location: Jura
- Coordinates: 46°30′14″N 6°05′25″E
- Type: Natural, Glacial
- Primary inflows: Orbe
- Primary outflows: Orbe
- Catchment area: 12 km^{2} (4.6 sq mi)
- Basin countries: France
- Max. length: 2 km (1.2 mi)
- Max. width: 900 m (3,000 ft)
- Surface area: 0.9 km^{2} (0.35 sq mi)
- Max. depth: 17 m (56 ft)
- Water volume: 10 hm^{3} (8,100 acre⋅ft)

Lac des Rousses video

Lac des Rousses is a lake in Les Rousses, Jura department, Bourgogne-Franche-Comté, France, close to the Vallée de Joux in Switzerland. The lake drains through the river Orbe into Lac de Joux.
