= L'Orient, Switzerland =

Coordinates: 46°36′6″N 6°14′25″E

L'Orient
- Municipality
- Location of L'Orient
- Location within Switzerland Location within Canton of Vaud
- Country: Switzerland
- Canton: Vaud
- District: Jura-Nord vaudois
- Municipality: Le Chenit
- Elevation: 1,010 m (3,310 ft)

Population
  - Total: 686 (2,000)
- Time zone: UTC+01:00 (CET)
  - Summer (DST): UTC+02:00 (CEST)
- Postal code: 1341
- Website: https://www.myvalleedejoux.ch/en/

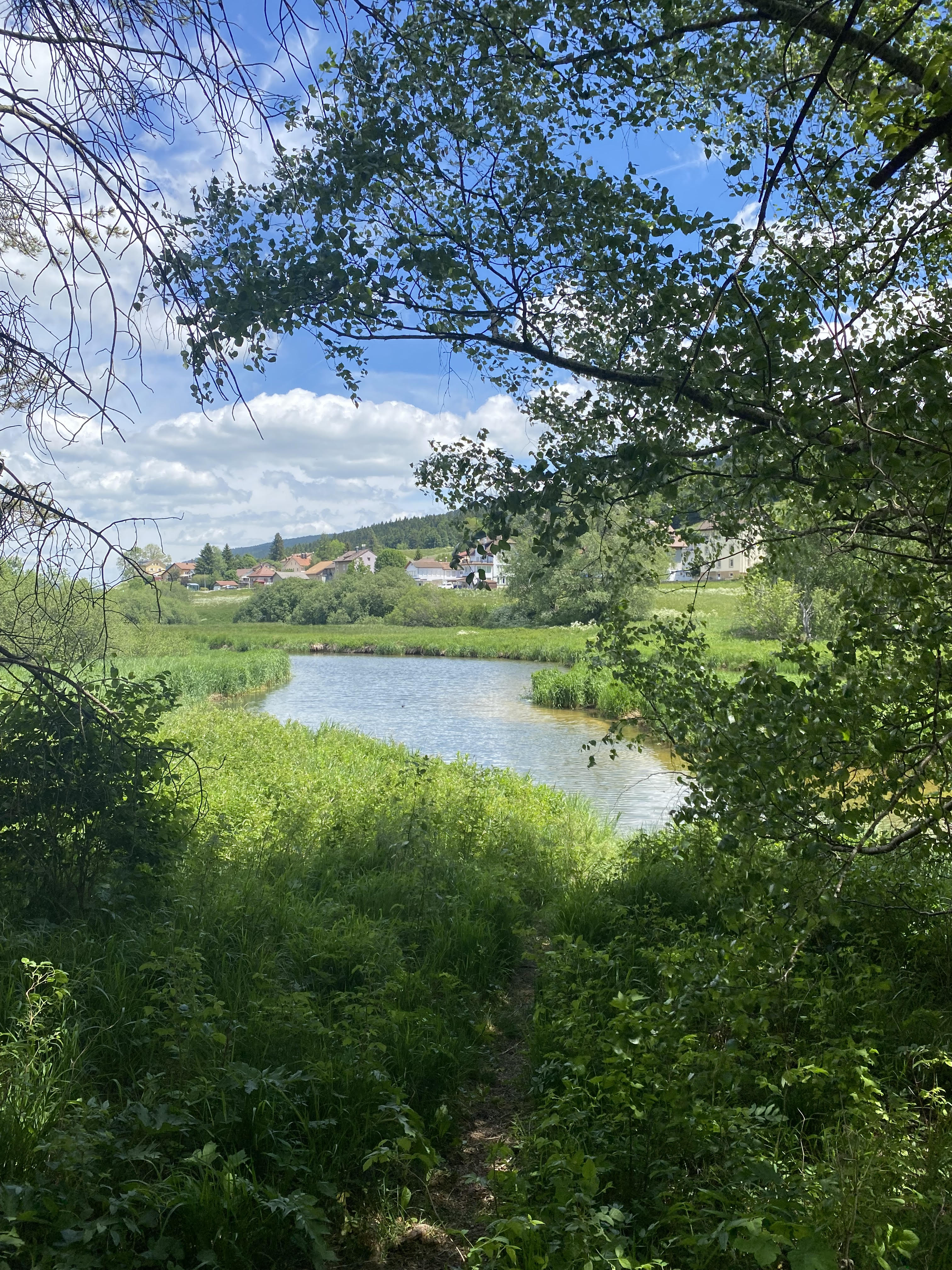
Orbe river in L'Orient

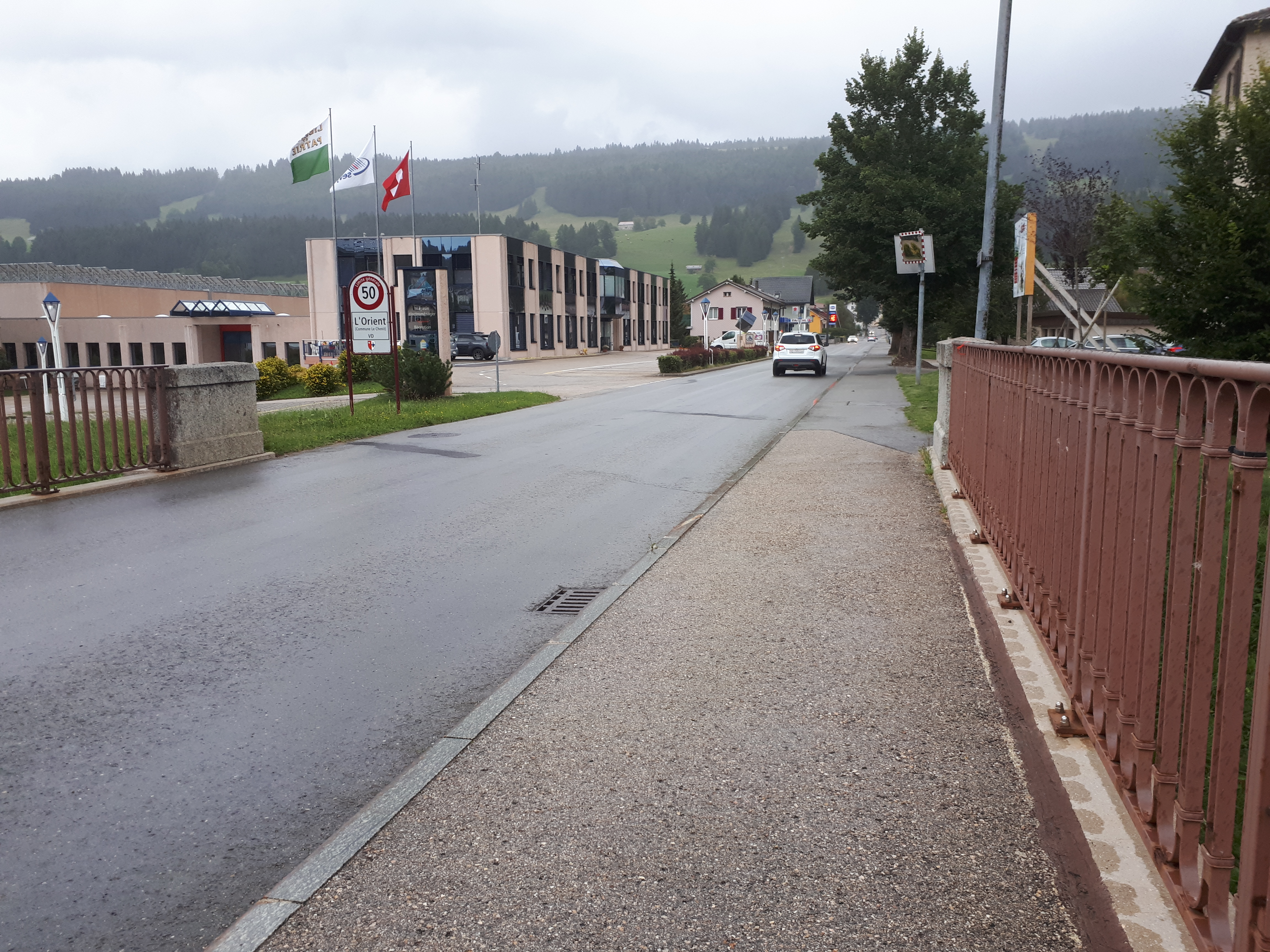
Street of the Village of L'Orient, Switzerland

L'Orient is a village in the Vallée de Joux, Vaud, Switzerland. It was created in 1904 and is part of the municipality of Le Chenit. The village takes its name from the fact that it is located on the right bank of the river Orbe.

== Geography ==
The village is located in the southern part of the Vallée de Joux, at a distance of about 50 km from Geneva and Lausanne. The Mont Tendre chain, part of the Jura Mountains, extends on the eastern side of the village. The village is located east of the river Orbe, which then flows into the Lac de Joux.

== History ==
From 1640 onwards, the inhabitants devoted themselves to agriculture and animal husbandry. The watchmaking industry radically changed the life of the population, especially when factories were created (Nouvelle Lémania in 1884, Valdar in 1914, both bought in 1999 by the Swatch Group, as well as Breguet).

At the beginning of the 21st century, the administrative council of the fraction (five members) levied taxes, managed the real estate, public lighting and urban planning. It reported directly to the prefect.

== Ski area ==
The ski area of L'Orient is part of a group of four ski resorts in the Vallée de Joux. L'Orient has a lighted slope for night skiing. It has several cross-country ski trails.
