= Lake Ter =

Lake in Vaud, Switzerland

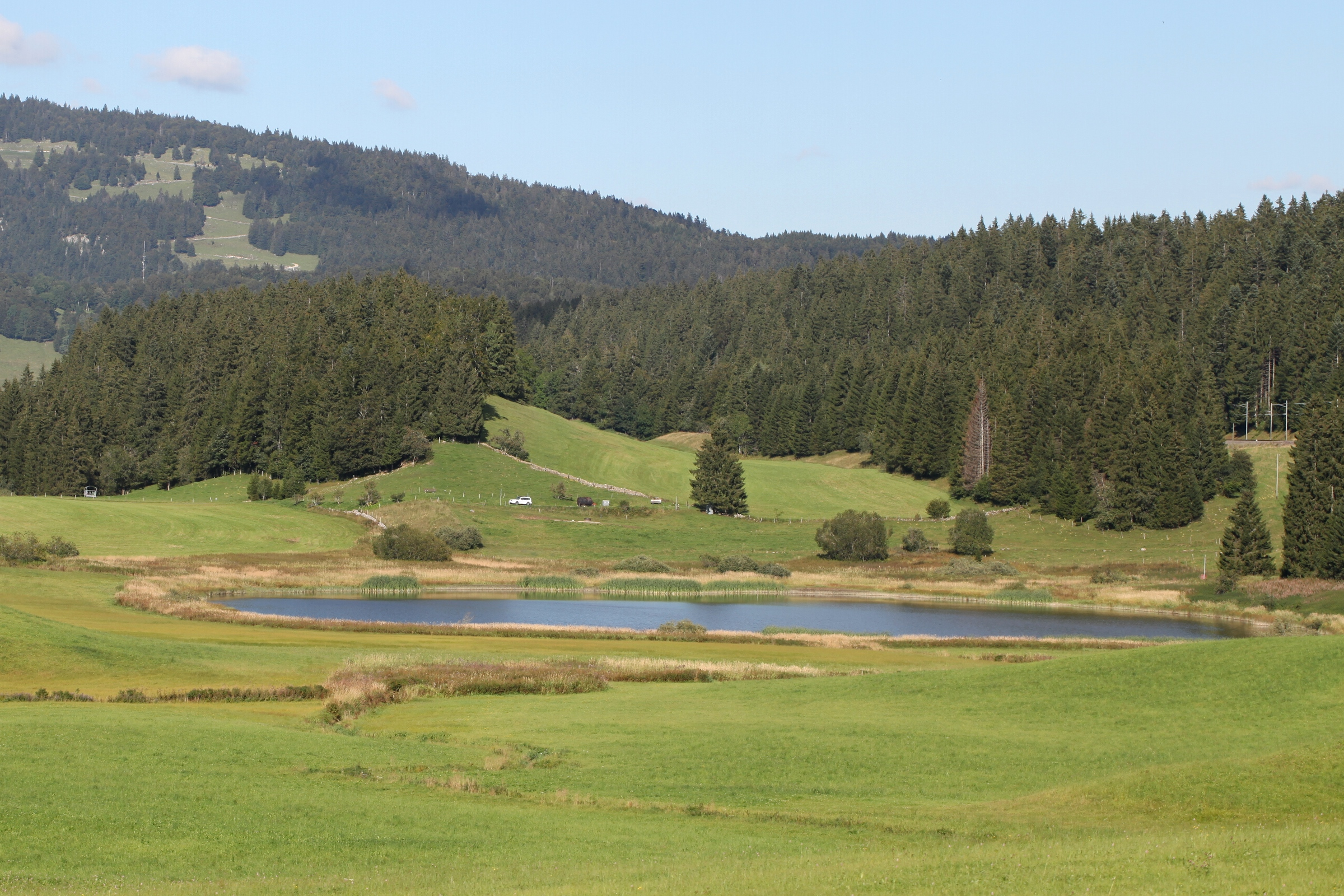

- Location within Canton of Vaud Location within Switzerland Location within Alps
- Interactive map of Lake Ter
- Location: Le Lieu, Vallée de Joux, Vaud
- Coordinates: 46°39′10″N 6°17′37″E
- Basin countries: Switzerland
- Surface elevation: 1,017 m (3,337 ft)

Lake Ter is a small lake at Le Lieu, in the Vallée de Joux of the canton of Vaud, Switzerland.
