= Orbe (river) =

River of the Rhine basin

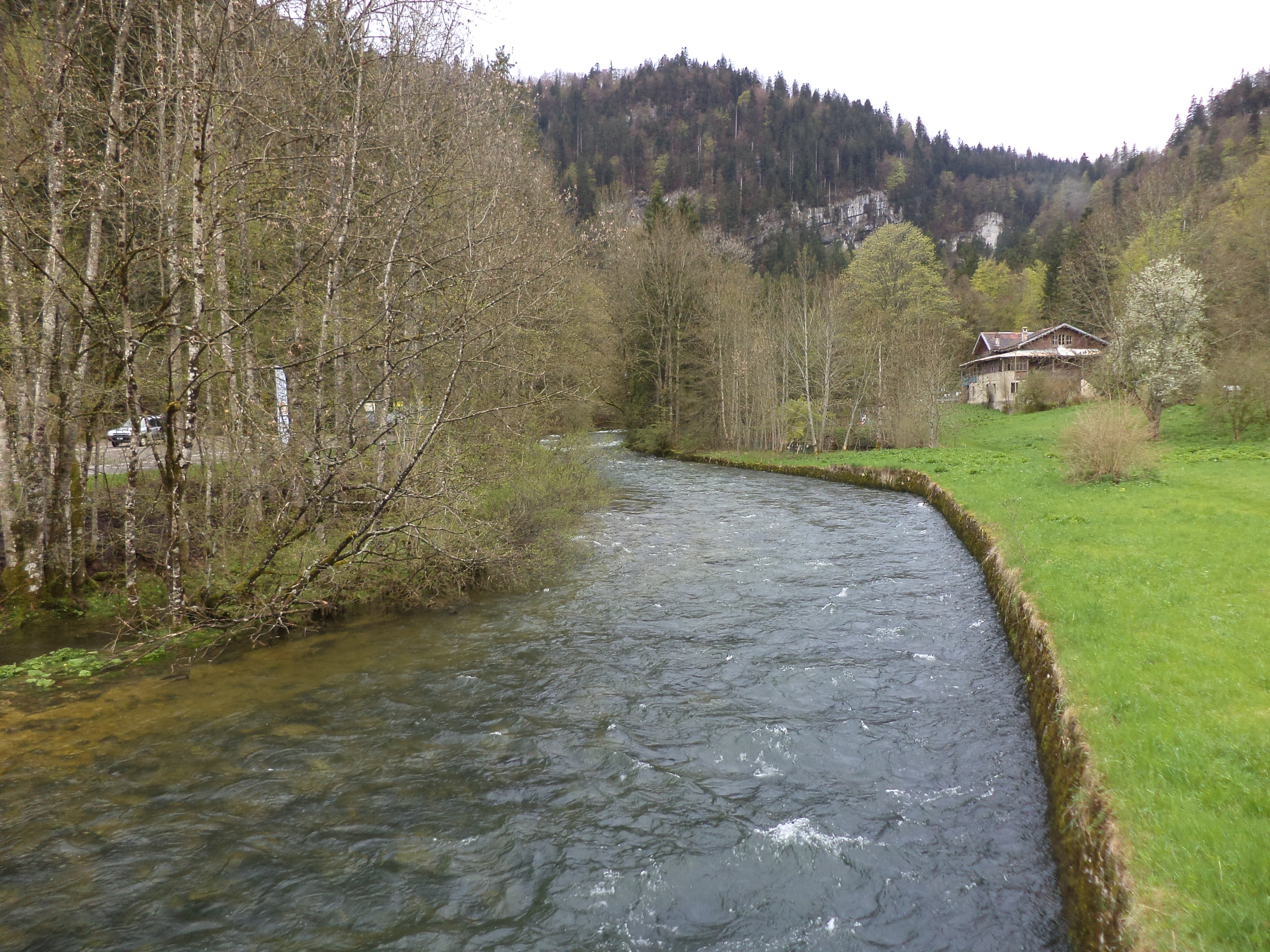

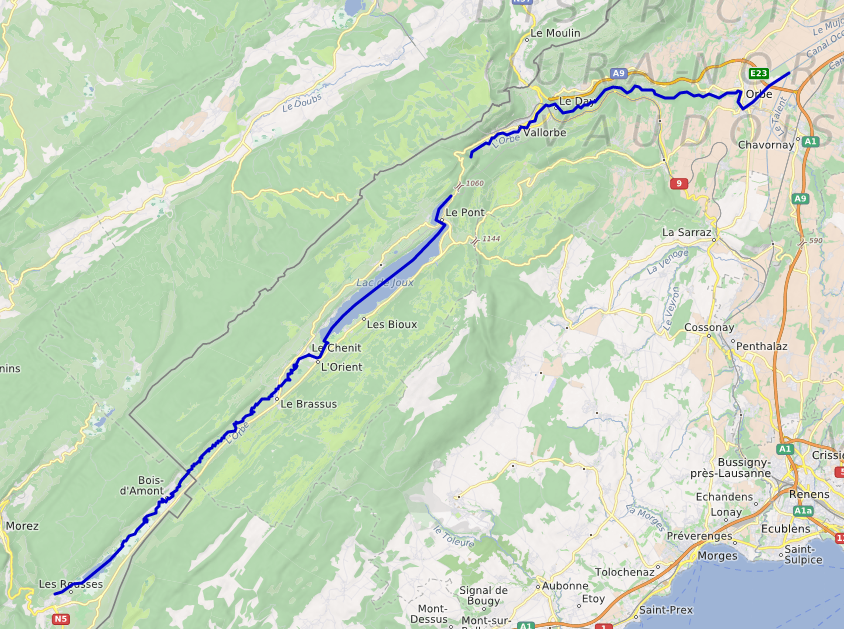

Location
- Countries: France and Switzerland

Physical characteristics
- Mouth: Thielle
  - coordinates: 46.7373°N 6.5631°E

Basin features
- Progression: Thielle→ Lake Biel→ Aare→ Rhine→ North Sea

The Orbe (French pronunciation: [ɔʁb]) is a river of the Rhine basin. It starts in France and flows to Switzerland where it forms the river Thielle at its confluence with the river Talent. Not to be mistaken with the Orbe, which is a tributary of the Arrats.

== Geography ==
The Orbe has its source near Rousses, forms the lac des Rousses before flowing down to lac de Joux in canton of Vaud, Switzerland. It disappears naturally underground for a stretch of 4 km, to reappear in Vallorbe - where a special ecotourism site was created, the Vallorbe Caves (note, to re-edit - http://www.grottesdevallorbe.ch/). Soon after, in Orbe, the river merges with the Talent and takes the name of Thielle. Flowing through Yverdon-les-Bains, it joins the lac de Neuchâtel. It flows out of it through the Thielle channel to the Nidau-Büren channel in Nidau, just before the regulating dam Port established between Port and Brügg that controls the levels of the three lakes of Seeland.

The Orbe and Thielle drain all the waters from the Canton of Vaud to the Rhine, with the exception of the river Venoge, divided by the Mormont, watershed between the former and the Rhone basins.

== History ==
See Jura water correction.

== Itinerary ==
- France
  - Les Rousses
  - Lac des Rousses
  - Bois-d'Amont Enters Swiss territory
- Canton de Vaud
  - Le Chenit
  - Lac de Joux
  - Le Pont
  - underground stretch
  - Vallorbe
  - Les Clées
  - Orbe
  - Leaves the community's territory in the plain of Orbe

== Tributaries ==
- Ruisseau des Epoisats
- La Jougnena
- Le Talent

== See also ==
- List of rivers of Switzerland
