= Breguet (brand) =

Swiss luxury watch manufacturer

Coordinates: 46.64912°N 6.31735°E

Groupe Horloger Breguet
- Type: Subsidiary
- Industry: Luxury watchmaking
- Founded: 1775; 251 years ago
- Founder: Abraham-Louis Breguet
- Headquarters: L'Abbaye, Switzerland
- Area served: Worldwide
- Key people: Nicolas G. Hayek
- Products: Tourbillon, watches, clocks, jewelry
- Parent: The Swatch Group
- Website: breguet.ch

Breguet (English: /brɛˈɡeɪ/, French: [bʁeɡɛ]) is a Swiss luxury watch, clock and jewelry manufacturer founded by Abraham-Louis Breguet in Paris in 1775. Headquartered in L'Abbaye, Switzerland, Breguet is one of the oldest surviving watchmaking brands and a pioneer of numerous watchmaking technologies such as the tourbillon, which was developed into a practical solution by Abraham Breguet in 1801. Abraham Breguet also invented and produced the world's first self-winding watch (the Perpétuelle) in 1780, as well as the world's first wristwatch in 1810 (the Breguet No.2639, for Caroline Bonaparte, Queen of Naples).

Since 1999, it has been a subsidiary of the Swiss Swatch Group.

== History ==
=== Early history ===
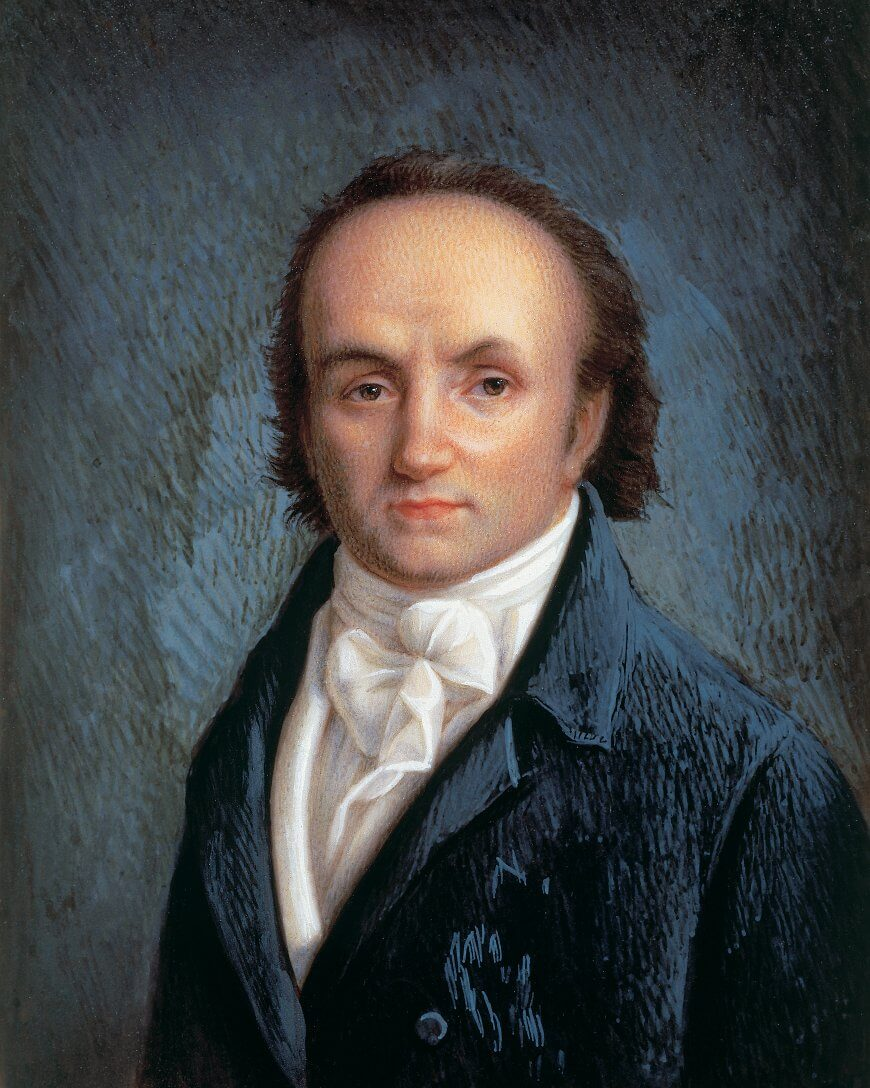
Abraham-Louis Breguet

Breguet was founded in 1775 by Abraham-Louis Breguet, a Swiss watchmaker born to Huguenot parents in Neuchâtel. He studied watchmaking for ten years under Ferdinand Berthoud and Jean-Antoine Lépine before setting up his own watchmaking business at 51 Quai de l'Horloge on the Île de la Cité in Paris. The dowry that came with his marriage to the daughter of a prosperous French bourgeois provided the backing which allowed him to open his own workshop.

Breguet's connections made during his apprenticeship as a watchmaker and as a student of mathematics helped him to establish his business. Following his introduction to the court, Queen Marie Antoinette grew fascinated by Breguet's unique self-winding watch; Louis XVI bought several of his watches. In 1783 the Swedish count Axel Von Fersen, who was the queen's friend and reputed lover, commissioned a watch from Breguet that was to contain every watch complication known at that time as a gift to Marie Antoinette. The result is a Breguet's masterpiece, the Marie-Antoinette pocket watch (Breguet No.160).

The business was a success, and around 1807 Abraham-Louis Breguet took on his son Louis-Antoine as his partner, renaming the firm "Breguet et Fils" (Breguet and Sons). Louis-Antoine took over the firm upon the death of his father in 1823. After Louis-Antoine retired in 1833 (he died in 1858) the business was passed to Abraham-Louis' grandson Louis Clément Francois (1804–1883).

Abraham-Louis' great-grandson Louis Antoine (1851–1882) was the last of the Breguet family to run the business. Although he had two sons and a daughter, they did not enter the business, so the Breguet company hired noted English watchmaker Edward Brown of Clerkenwell to manage the Paris factory. Brown eventually became a partner and, after Breguet's grandson's death, the owner and head of the company. When Brown died in 1895 the firm was taken over by his sons, Edward and Henry. On Edward's retirement in the early 1900s, Henry Brown became the head of the firm.

=== Recent development ===
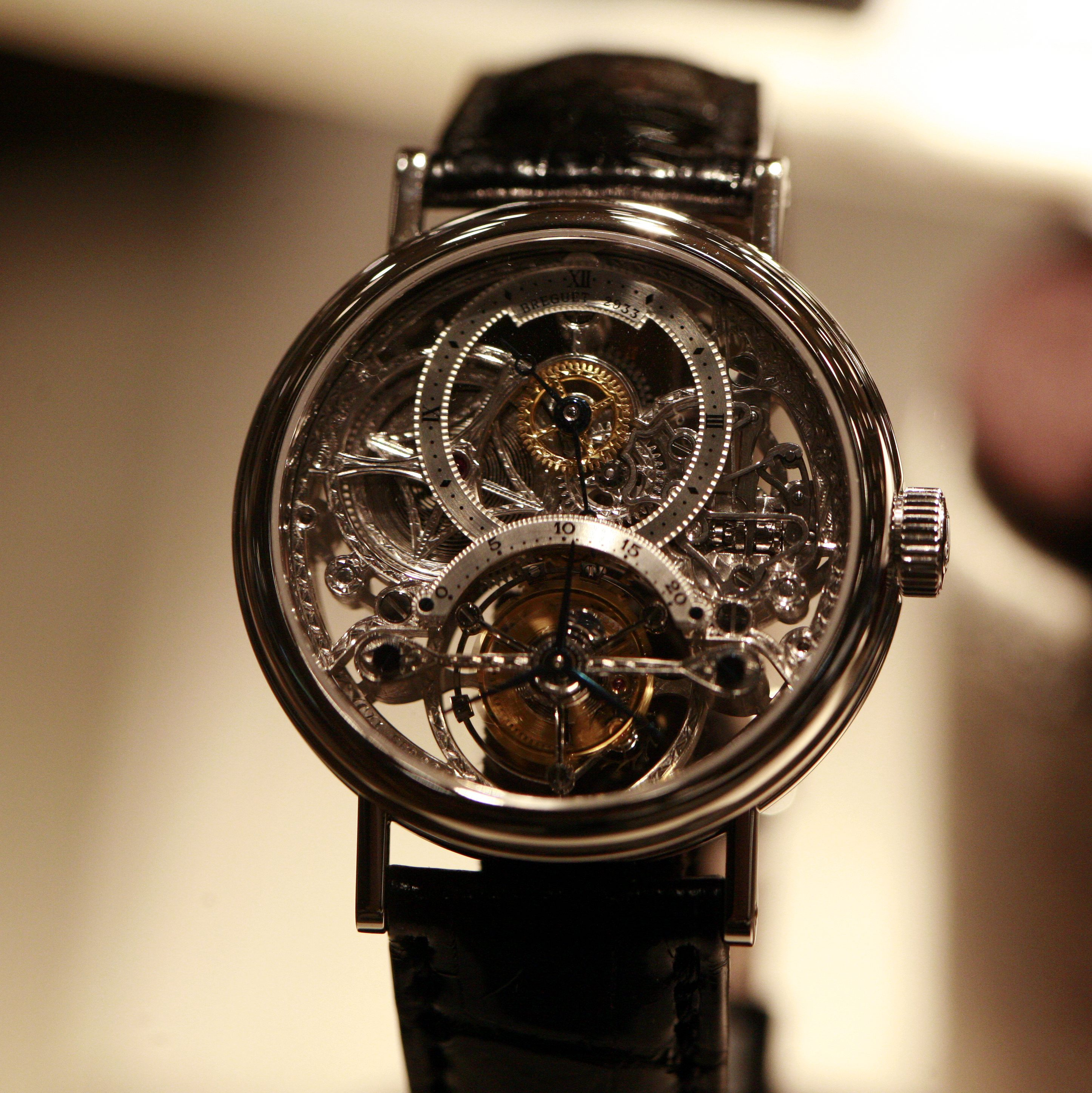
A tourbillon movement watch by Breguet

From 1870 to 1970, Breguet was owned by the English Brown family. The Brown family were of English origin, Edward Brown was prominent factory manager who acquired Breguet from Abraham-Louis’ grandson, Louis-François, an engineer. Brown managed the brand through the turbulent French politics of the late 19th century. It was only after Edward’s death that the firm saw its sales rise near the levels it enjoyed before 1870. Edward’s son, Edouard, took over the business until 1912 when his brother Henry took over. After the Brown family, the ownership changed hands several times during the quartz crisis in the 1970s and 1980s. In 1976, Breguet's then-owner Chaumet closed its French factory and moved production to the Vallée de Joux in Switzerland.

In 1987, Breguet was acquired by Investcorp which, in 1991, created the Groupe Horloger Breguet (GHB). The Breguet Group consists of four subsidiaries: Montres Breguet SA, Breguet SA, Valdar SA and Nouvelle Lemania SA (which Breguet Group acquired in 1992). As a result, Breguet-brand watches are now made at the Nouvelle Lemania factory in Switzerland. In particular, Montres Breguet SA is the main company that sells timepieces under the brand name of "Breguet", and Breguet SA is the name of Breguet Group's distribution company in France.

In 1999, Groupe Horloger Breguet was acquired by the Swatch Group from Investcorp. Breguet is an active member of the Federation of the Swiss Watch Industry FH.

== Manufacturing ==
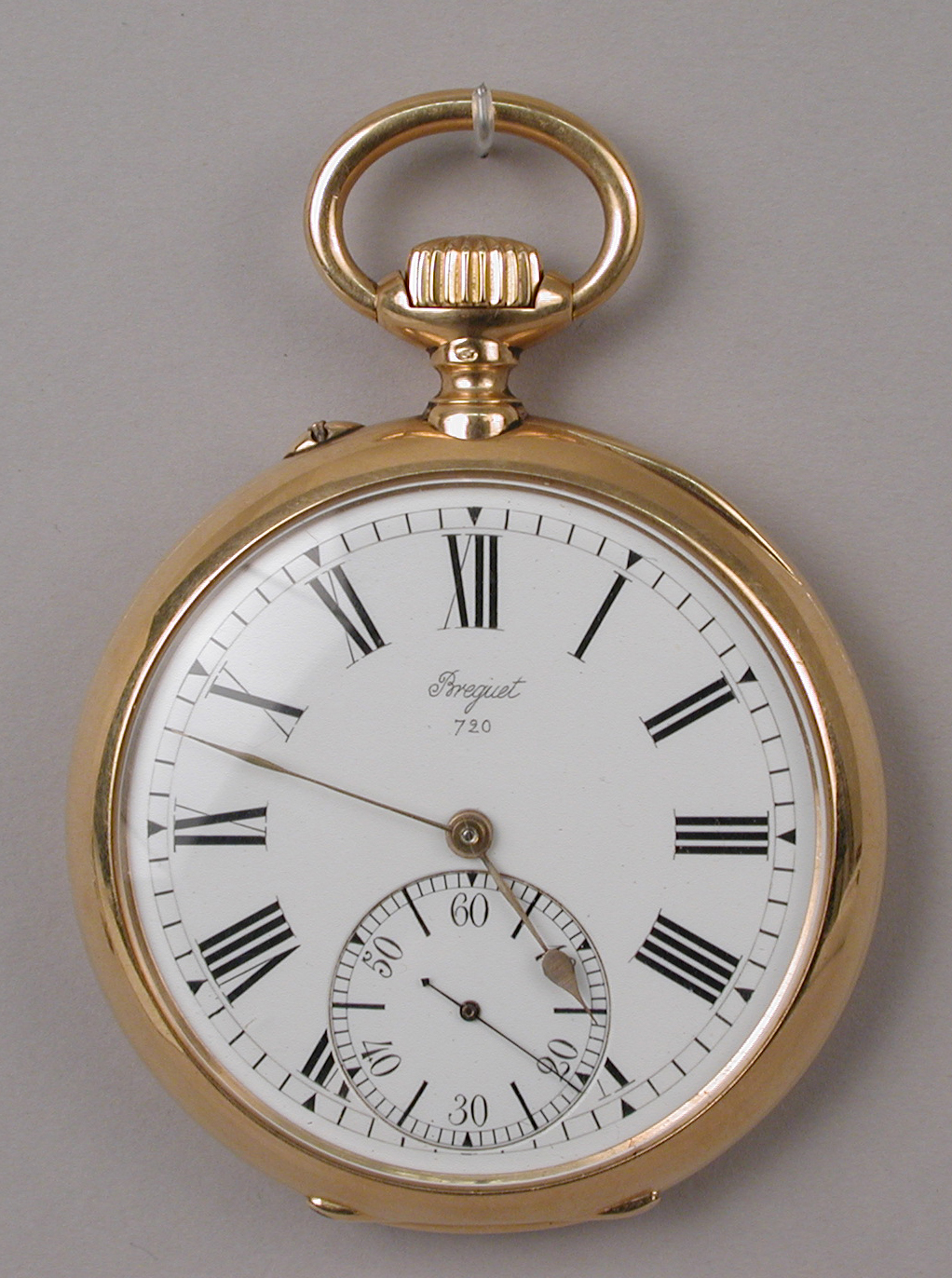
A Breguet pocket watch in the Metropolitan Museum of Art, New York.

Breguet watches are often easily recognized for their coin-edge cases, guilloché dials and blue pomme hands (often now referred to as 'Breguet hands'). In addition to watches, Breguet also manufactures writing instruments, women's jewelry, and cufflinks.

Breguet, along with 7 other major Swiss watch manufacturers (including Patek Philippe, Audemars Piguet and Rolex), were given the lowest environmental rating of "Latecomers/Non-transparent" by World Wide Fund for Nature (WWF) in 2018, suggesting that the manufacturer has taken very few actions addressing the impact of its manufacturing activities on the environment and climate change.

=== Inventions and patents ===
The following are some of the important inventions of Abraham-Louis Breguet and Breguet company:

- In 1780, invented and produced the world's self-winding/automatic watch (the Perpétuelle).
- In 1783, invented the Gong-spring, laying the foundation for minute repeaters.
- In 1783, invented the Breguet hands.
- In 1790, invented the Pare-chute, one of the world's first shock protection systems.
- In 1795, invented the Breguet overcoil or Breguet spiral, being widely used in watchmaking industry to this day.
- In 1801, invented tourbillon, balancing the effect of gravity.
- In 1810, invented and produced the world's first wristwatch (Breguet No. 2639).
- In 1830, Breguet produces the first watch wound without a key, equipped with a knurled knob for winding and setting the time.
- In 1929, created the world's first (possibly) perpetual calendar movement for wristwatches (Breguet No. 2516).
- In 2010, patented the magnetic pivot, used to improve watch precision using magnetism.
- In 2010, introduced the magnetic strike governor.

== Notable models ==
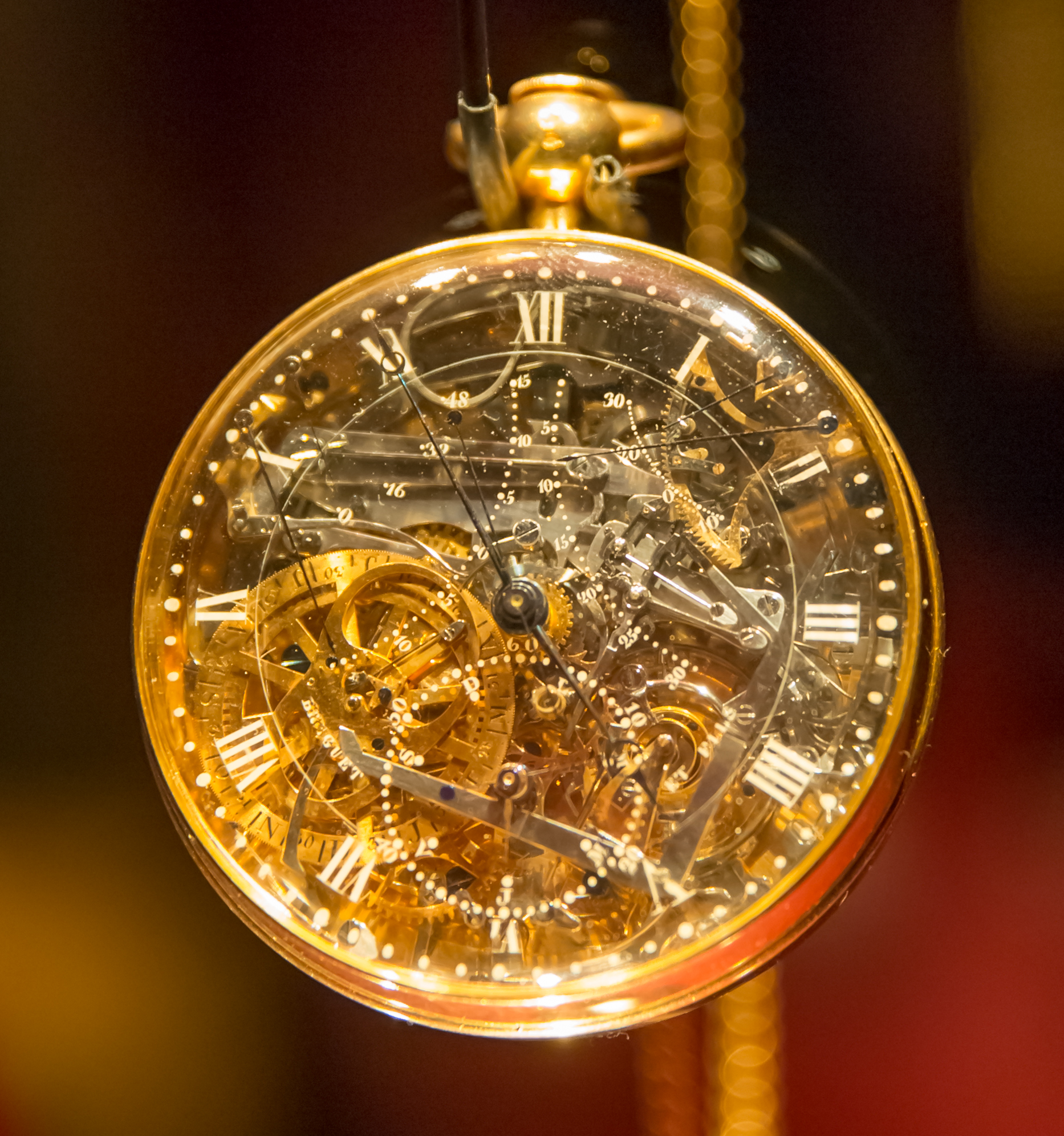
Breguet No.160, Marie-Antoinette pocket watch

=== Marie-Antoinette pocket watch ===
In 1783, an admirer of Marie Antoinette, the Queen of France, commissioned a watch from Abraham-Louis Breguet as a gift for the Queen. The requirement was that the watch should be "as spectacular as possible, incorporating the fullest range of horological expertise known at the time". There was no time deadline or financial limit with the commission.

The final product was the Breguet No.160 grand complication (Marie-Antoinette pocket watch). However, the watch was only finished in 1827, 34 years after the death of the Queen during French Revolution, and four years after the death of Abraham-Louis Breguet (the watch was eventually completed by the son of Abraham Breguet). In total, it took 44 years to make the watch.

The watch had been kept in the Museum for Islamic Art in Jerusalem until it was stolen in 1983. In 2007, the watch was eventually recovered and returned to the museum.

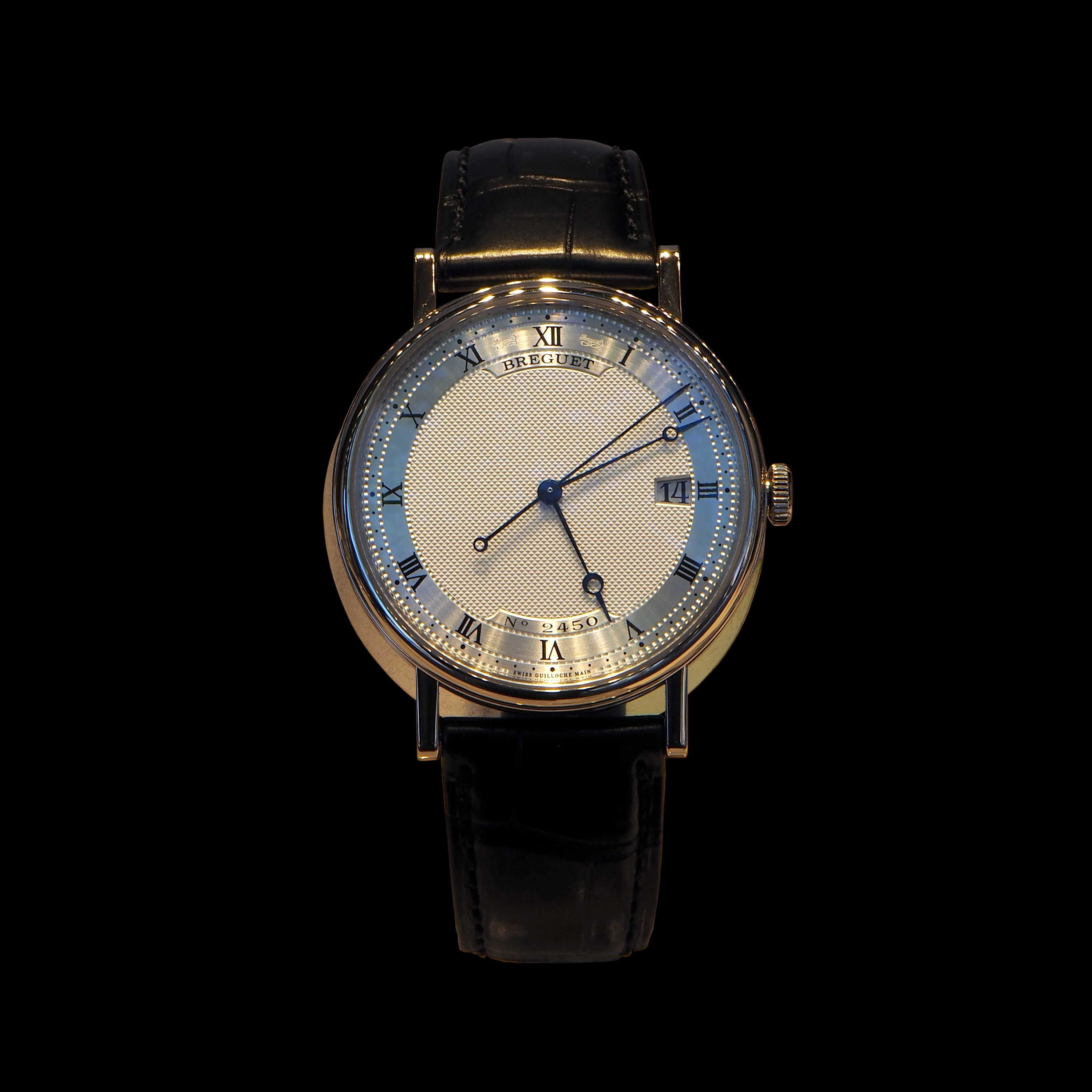
Breguet Classique 9067 (hour and date indicator, golden bezel)

=== Gentleman's collection ===
- Classique: popular round pieces, usually with reeded casebands and soldered lugs;
  - Grand complications
  - The Classique Tourbillon Extra-Flat, available in rose gold or platinum.
  - The Classique Small Seconds, available in rose gold or in white gold.
- La Marine – water-resistant, distinguished by the presence of crown guards;
- Heritage – tonneau-shaped cases;
- Type XX, XXI, XXII – sports chronographs, based on World War II-era pilots' watches;
  - The Type XXII Flyback Chronograph, available in rose gold.
- Tradition – similar to the long gone Souscription by Breguet, open-faced watches with the movement on the front, along with a small face.

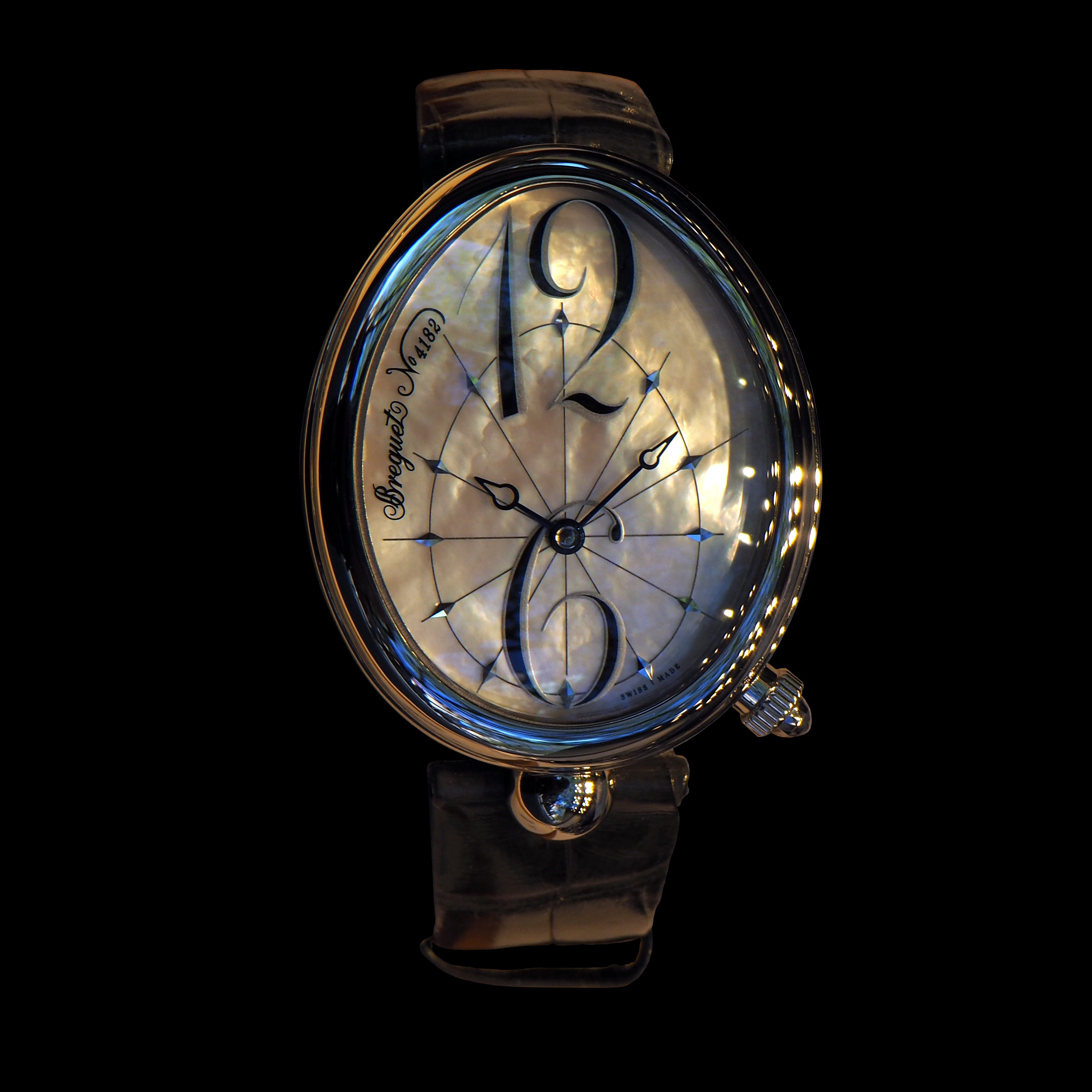
Reine de Naples

=== Lady's collection ===
- Classique
- La Marine
- Heritage
- Tradition
- Reine de Naples – known by the motto "In every woman is a queen."

=== Most expensive pieces ===
- Breguet & Fils, Paris No.2667 – Pocket watch, sold in May 2012 at Christie's Geneva auction for US$4.69 million (CHF 4,339,000).
- Breguet, Paris, No.4111 – Pocket watch, sold in May 2012 at Christie's Geneva auction for US$2.75 million (CHF 2,547,000).
- Breguet Sympathique Clock No.128 & 5009 (Duc d'Orléans Breguet Sympathique) – In December 2012, the clock formerly owned by Ferdinand Philippe, Duke of Orléans) was auctioned by Sotheby's for US$6.8 million in New York, making it the most expensive Breguet timepiece ever sold at auction. The clock was auctioned by Sotheby's for the first time in 1999, fetching a record-breaking US$5,777,500 in New York, after the shutdown of the celebrated Time Museum in Rockford, Illinois.
- Breguet & Fils, No.217 – Pocket watch, sold in May 2016 at Christie's Geneva auction for US$3.33 million (CHF 3,245,000).

== See also ==
- List of watch manufacturers
- Manufacture d'horlogerie
