= Vallorbe =

- Municipality
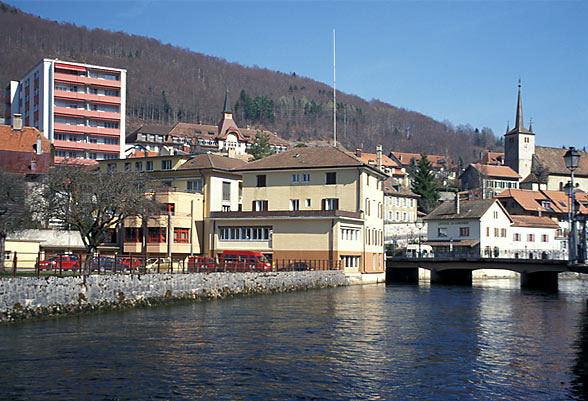
- Vallorbe

- Flag Coat of arms
- Location of Vallorbe
- Location within Switzerland Location within Canton of Vaud
- Coordinates: 46°43′N 06°23′E
- Country: Switzerland
- Canton: Vaud
- District: Jura-Nord Vaudois

Government
  - Mayor: Syndic; Stéphane Costantini LPS/PLS (as of 2008)

Area
  - Total: 23.18 km^{2} (8.95 sq mi)
- Elevation: 770 m (2,530 ft)
- Highest elevation (At Dent de Vaulion): 1,480 m (4,860 ft)
- Lowest elevation (Orbe): 610 m (2,000 ft)

Population (2004)
  - Total: 3,118
  - Density: 134.5/km^{2} (348.4/sq mi)
- Demonym(s): Les Vallorbiers; Les Tire-Lune
- Time zone: UTC+01:00 (CET)
  - Summer (DST): UTC+02:00 (CEST)
- Postal code: 1337
- SFOS number: 5764
- ISO 3166 code: CH-VD
- Localities: Le Creux, Le Day
- Surrounded by: Ballaigues, Les Clées, Premier, Vaulion, L'Abbaye, Le Lieu, France (pays)
- Website: www.vallorbe.ch

Vallorbe (French pronunciation: [valɔʁb]) is a municipality in the district of Jura-Nord Vaudois in the canton of Vaud in Switzerland.

== History ==
Vallorbe is first mentioned in 1139 as de valle urbanensi. In 1148 it was mentioned as de valle urbe.

== Geography ==
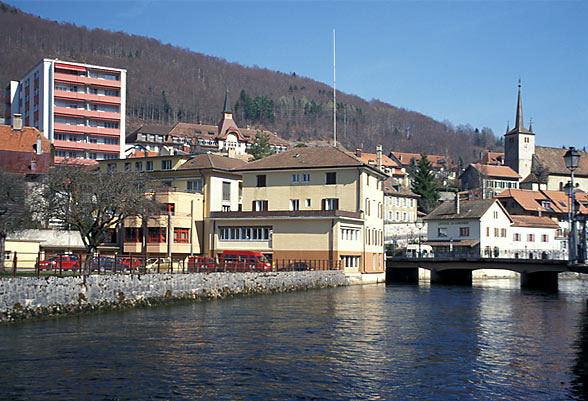
Orbe river in Vallorbe

Aerial view by Walter Mittelholzer (1931)

Vallorbe has an area, as of 2009, of 23.2 square kilometers (9.0 mi^{2}). Of this area, 5.12 km^{2} (1.98 mi^{2}) or 22.1% is used for agricultural purposes, while 15.47 km^{2} (5.97 mi^{2}) or 66.7% is forested. Of the rest of the land, 2.17 km^{2} (0.84 mi^{2}) or 9.4% is settled (buildings or roads), 0.28 km^{2} (0.11 mi^{2}) or 1.2% is either rivers or lakes and 0.15 km^{2} (37 acres) or 0.6% is unproductive land.

Of the built up area, housing and buildings made up 3.5% and transportation infrastructure made up 4.3%. Out of the forested land, 64.6% of the total land area is heavily forested and 2.2% is covered with orchards or small clusters of trees. Of the agricultural land, 1.4% is used for growing crops and 16.6% is pastures and 3.9% is used for alpine pastures. Of the water in the municipality, 0.4% is in lakes and 0.8% is in rivers and streams.

The municipality was part of the Orbe District until it was dissolved on 31 August 2006, and Vallorbe became part of the new district of Jura-Nord Vaudois.

The municipality is located on the Swiss-French border. It is surrounded on three sides with mountains and reaches from 610 to 1,480 m (2,000 to 4,860 ft) in elevation. On the east side, the valley opens up due to the Jougnenaz and Orbe rivers. It includes the hamlets of Le Day, Le Creux and Bellevue.

== Coat of arms ==
The blazon of the municipal coat of arms is Or, on a Bend wavy Azure a Trout proper bendwise.

== Demographics ==
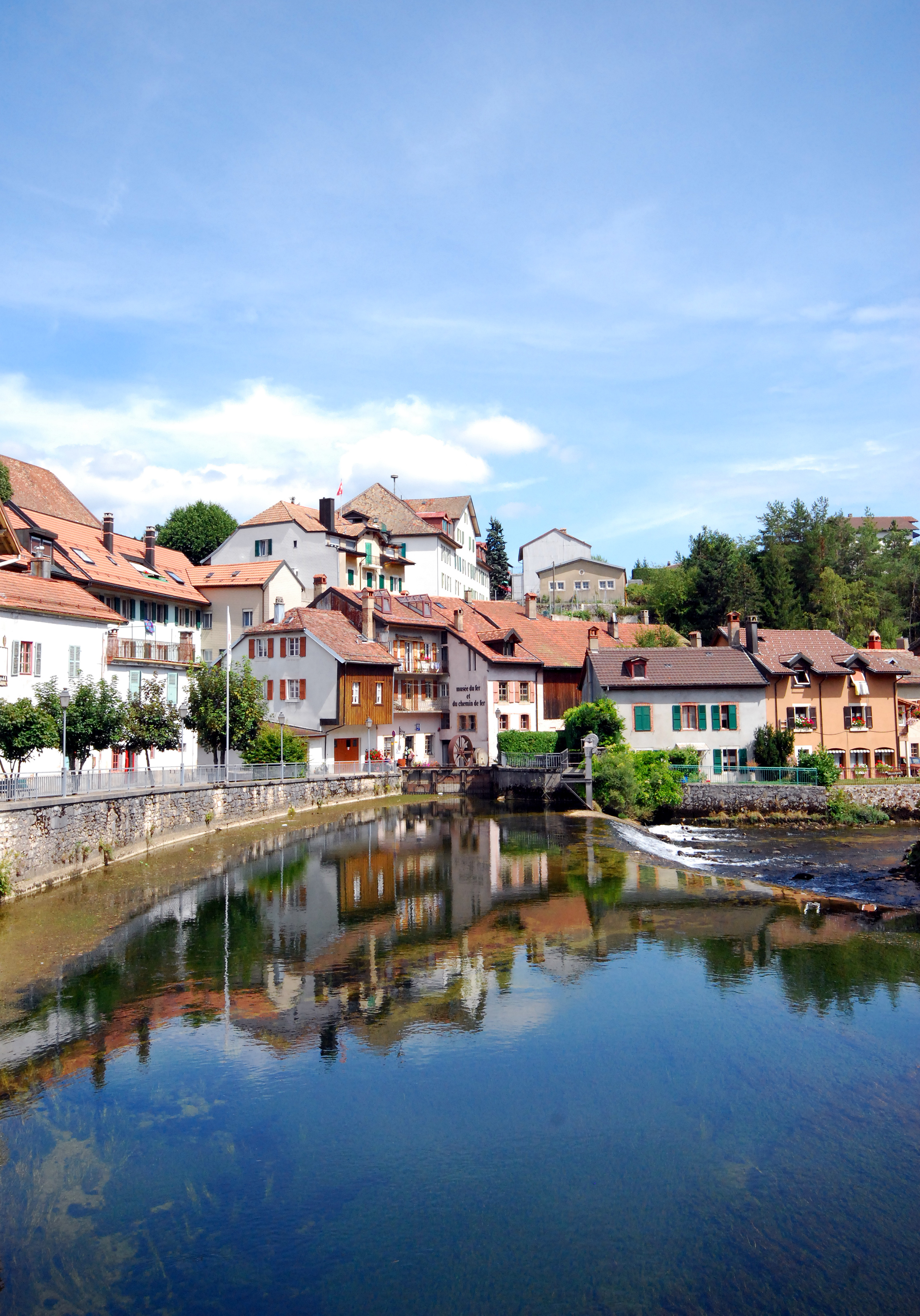
Vallorbe village

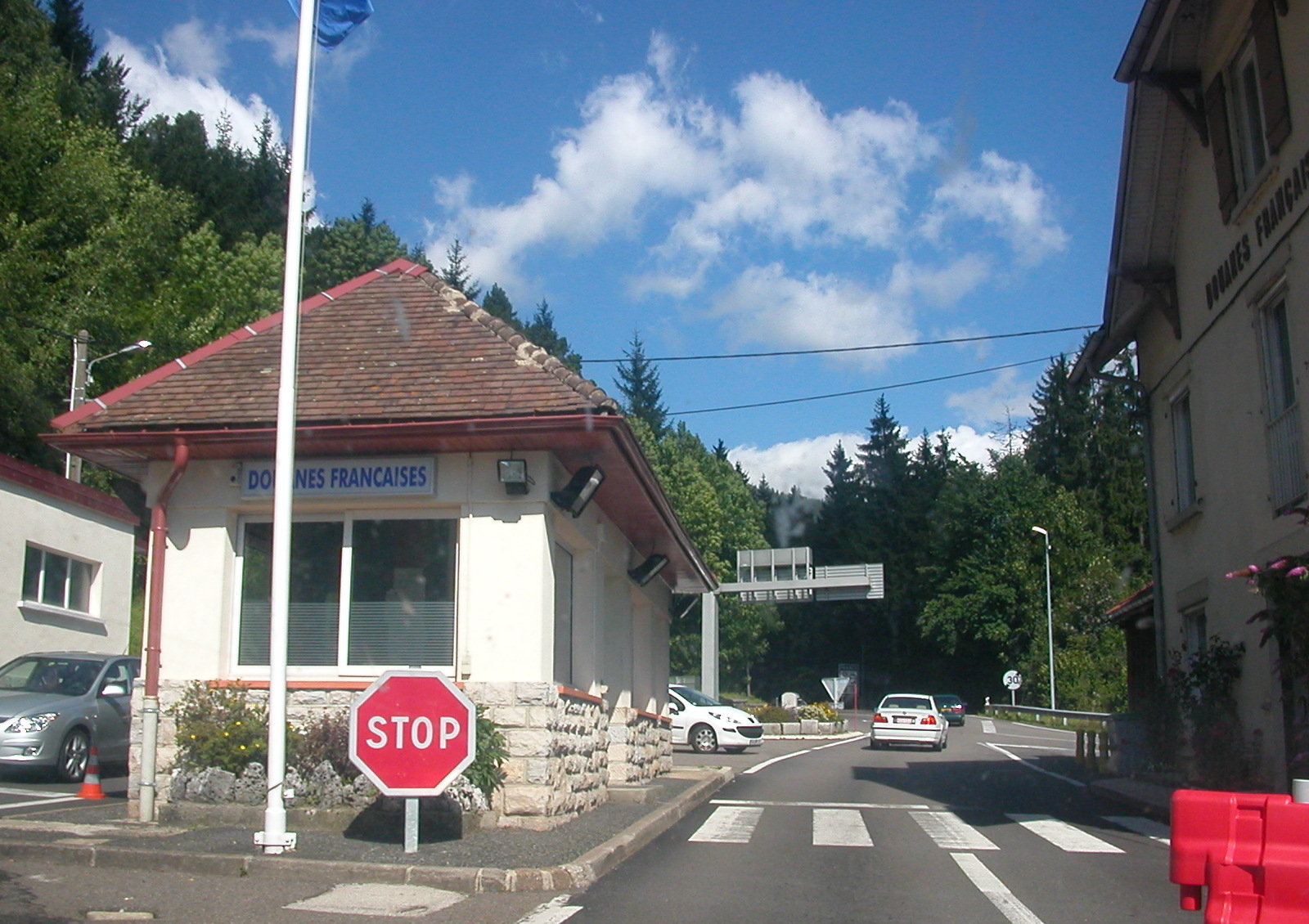
French-Swiss border at Vallorbe

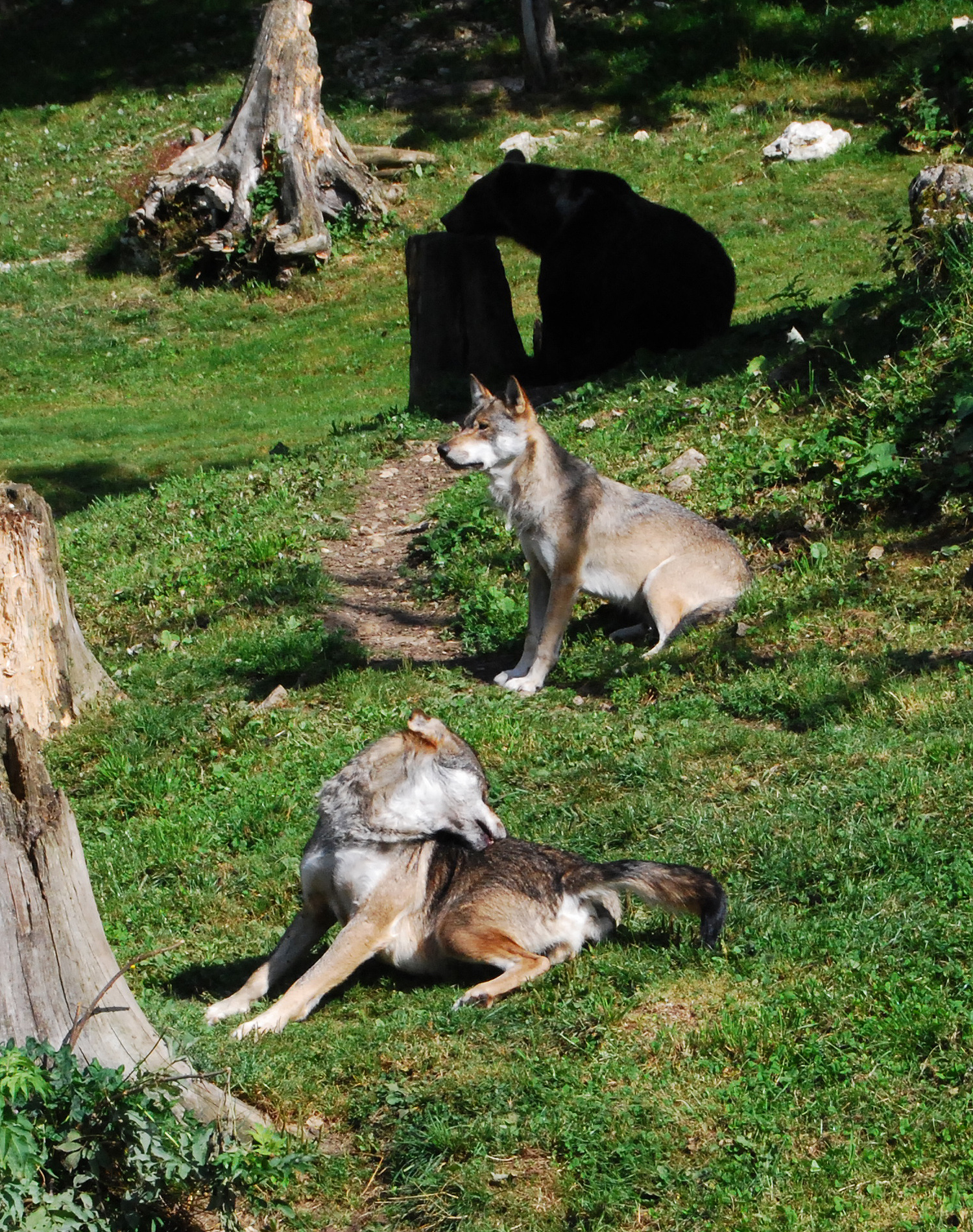
Wolves at Juraparc near Vallorbe

Vallorbe has a population (as of December 2020) of 3,863. As of 2008, 23.1% of the population are resident foreign nationals. Over the last 10 years (1999–2009 ) the population has changed at a rate of 7.2%. It has changed at a rate of 10% due to migration and at a rate of -1.8% due to births and deaths.

Most of the population (as of 2000) speaks French (2,776 or 85.5%), with Italian being second most common (114 or 3.5%) and Albanian being third (78 or 2.4%). There are 74 people who speak German and 3 people who speak Romansh.

The age distribution, as of 2009, in Vallorbe is; 327 children or 9.9% of the population are between 0 and 9 years old and 422 teenagers or 12.7% are between 10 and 19. Of the adult population, 418 people or 12.6% of the population are between 20 and 29 years old. 391 people or 11.8% are between 30 and 39, 481 people or 14.5% are between 40 and 49, and 460 people or 13.9% are between 50 and 59. The senior population distribution is 353 people or 10.7% of the population are between 60 and 69 years old, 262 people or 7.9% are between 70 and 79, there are 170 people or 5.1% who are between 80 and 89, and there are 27 people or 0.8% who are 90 and older.

As of 2000, there were 1,248 people who were single and never married in the municipality. There were 1,585 married individuals, 245 widows or widowers and 169 individuals who are divorced.

As of 2000, there were 1,385 private households in the municipality, and an average of 2.2 persons per household. There were 515 households that consist of only one person and 82 households with five or more people. Out of a total of 1,400 households that answered this question, 36.8% were households made up of just one person and there were 9 adults who lived with their parents. Of the rest of the households, there are 414 married couples without children, 372 married couples with children There were 61 single parents with a child or children. There were 14 households that were made up of unrelated people and 15 households that were made up of some sort of institution or another collective housing.

In 2000 there were 256 single family homes (or 40.2% of the total) out of a total of 637 inhabited buildings. There were 233 multi-family buildings (36.6%), along with 102 multi-purpose buildings that were mostly used for housing (16.0%) and 46 other use buildings (commercial or industrial) that also had some housing (7.2%). In 2000, a total of 1,363 apartments (84.6% of the total) were permanently occupied, while 126 apartments (7.8%) were seasonally occupied and 123 apartments (7.6%) were empty. As of 2009, the construction rate of new housing units was 2.4 new units per 1000 residents. The vacancy rate for the municipality, in 2010, was 0.29%.

The historical population is given in the following chart:

== Heritage sites of national significance ==
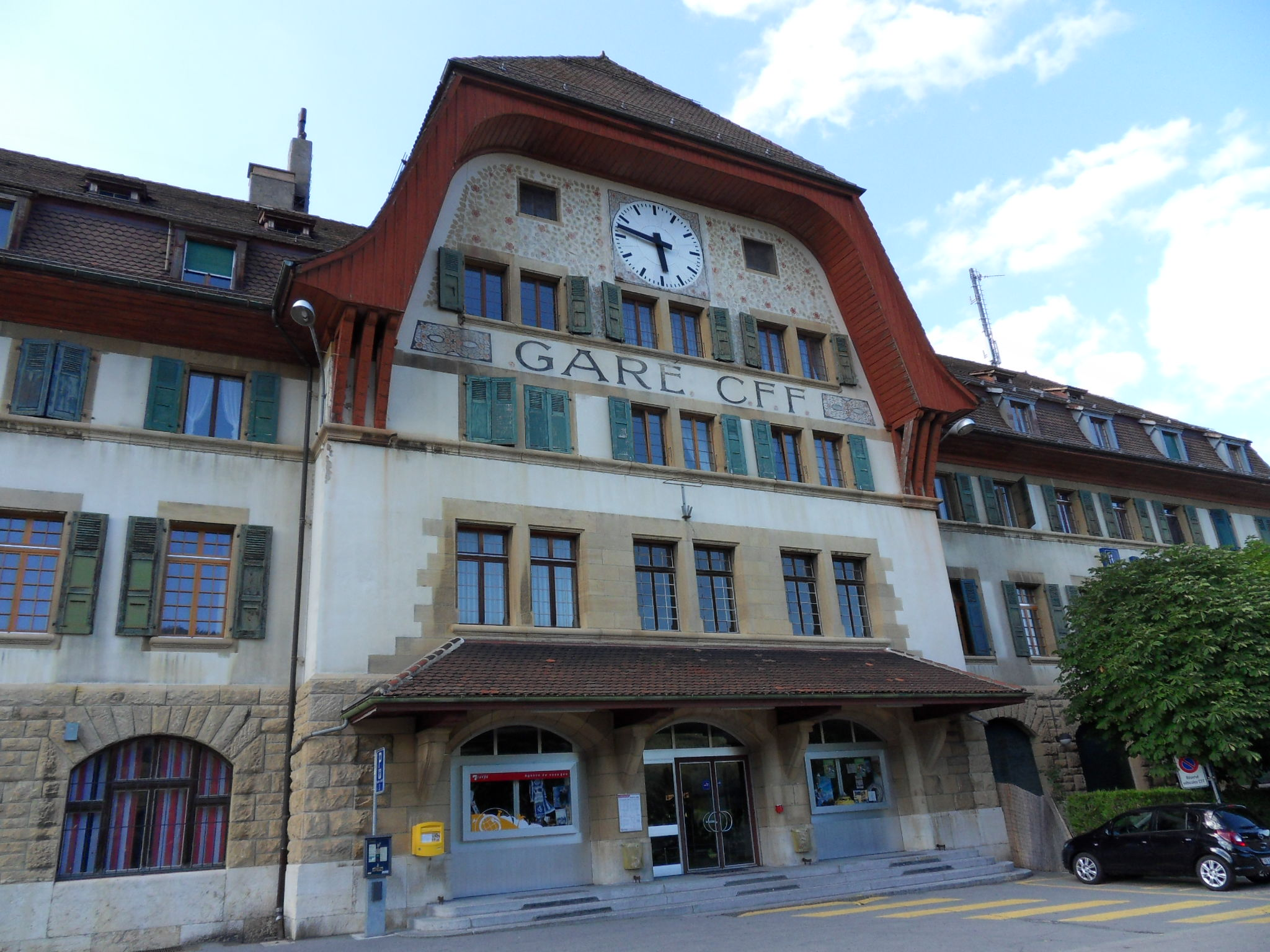
Vallorbe international railway station building

Vallorbe international railway station is listed as a Swiss heritage site of national significance. The entire urban village of Vallorbe is part of the Inventory of Swiss Heritage Sites.

== Politics ==
In the 2007 federal election the most popular party was the SP which received 27.59% of the vote. The next three most popular parties were the SVP (25.93%), the FDP (13.57%) and the Green Party (9.59%). In the federal election, a total of 745 votes were cast, and the voter turnout was 38.1%.

== Economy ==
As of 2010, Vallorbe had an unemployment rate of 7.7%. As of 2008, there were 45 people employed in the primary economic sector and about 21 businesses involved in this sector. 713 people were employed in the secondary sector and there were 34 businesses in this sector. 702 people were employed in the tertiary sector, with 112 businesses in this sector. There were 1,432 residents of the municipality who were employed in some capacity, of which females made up 44.1% of the workforce.

In 2008 the total number of full-time equivalent jobs was 1,282. The number of jobs in the primary sector was 31, of which 24 were in agriculture, 6 were in forestry or lumber production and 1 was in fishing or fisheries. The number of jobs in the secondary sector was 682 of which 579 or (84.9%) were in manufacturing and 59 (8.7%) were in construction. The number of jobs in the tertiary sector was 569. In the tertiary sector; 184 or 32.3% were in wholesale or retail sales or the repair of motor vehicles, 68 or 12.0% were in the movement and storage of goods, 50 or 8.8% were in a hotel or restaurant, 1 was in the information industry, 6 or 1.1% were the insurance or financial industry, 14 or 2.5% were technical professionals or scientists, 55 or 9.7% were in education and 53 or 9.3% were in health care.

In 2000, there were 1,285 workers who commuted into the municipality and 662 workers who commuted away. The municipality is a net importer of workers, with about 1.9 workers entering the municipality for every one leaving. About 37.7% of the workforce coming into Vallorbe are coming from outside Switzerland, while 0.0% of the locals commute out of Switzerland for work. Of the working population, 11.7% used public transportation to get to work, and 57.1% used a private car.

== Transportation ==
Vallorbe CFF is the first and last Swiss railway station served by the TGV Lyria railway line from Lausanne to Paris. Vallorbe is also served by Swiss Federal Railways' hourly running suburban train S2 on the Simplon Railway to Lausanne and further to Palézieux. CFF also runs hourly services on the Vallorbe–Le Brassus railway line into the Vallée de Joux to Le Brassus in the south-west end of the valley. From there a bus connection connects Le Brassus with Nyon at the Lake of Geneva. They are all part of the integrated mobilis (canton of Vaud) fare network.

== Religion ==
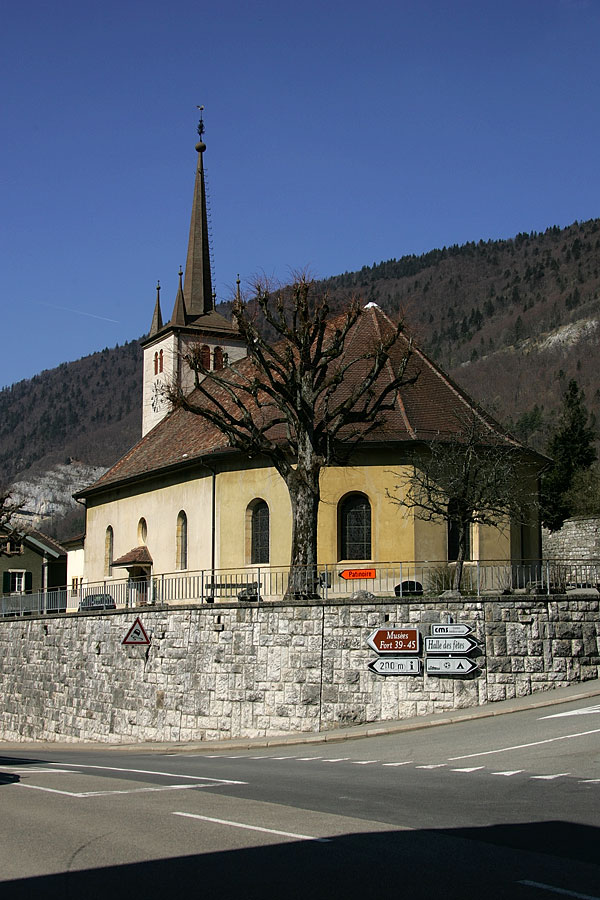
Church at Vallorbe

From the 2000 census, 1,130 or 34.8% were Roman Catholic, while 1,260 or 38.8% belonged to the Swiss Reformed Church. Of the rest of the population, there were 34 members of an Orthodox church (or about 1.05% of the population), and there were 246 individuals (or about 7.58% of the population) who belonged to another Christian church. There was 1 individual who was Jewish, and 239 (or about 7.36% of the population) who were Islamic. There were 9 individuals who were Buddhist, 1 person who was Hindu and 9 individuals who belonged to another church. 262 (or about 8.07% of the population) belonged to no church, are agnostic or atheist, and 177 individuals (or about 5.45% of the population) did not answer the question.

== Education ==
In Vallorbe about 995 or (30.6%) of the population have completed non-mandatory upper secondary education, and 182 or (5.6%) have completed additional higher education (either university or a Fachhochschule). Of the 182 who completed tertiary schooling, 56.6% were Swiss men, 22.5% were Swiss women, 14.3% were non-Swiss men and 6.6% were non-Swiss women.

In the 2009/2010 school year there were a total of 421 students in the Vallorbe school district. In the Vaud cantonal school system, two years of non-obligatory pre-school are provided by the political districts. During the school year, the political district provided pre-school care for a total of 578 children of which 359 children (62.1%) received subsidized pre-school care. The canton's primary school program requires students to attend for four years. There were 215 students in the municipal primary school program. The obligatory lower secondary school program lasts for six years and there were 196 students in those schools. There were also 10 students who were home schooled or attended another non-traditional school.

As of 2000, there were 100 students in Vallorbe who came from another municipality, while 101 residents attended schools outside the municipality.
