= Vallée de Joux =

Valley in Switzerland and France

Coordinates: 46°35′N 6°13′E

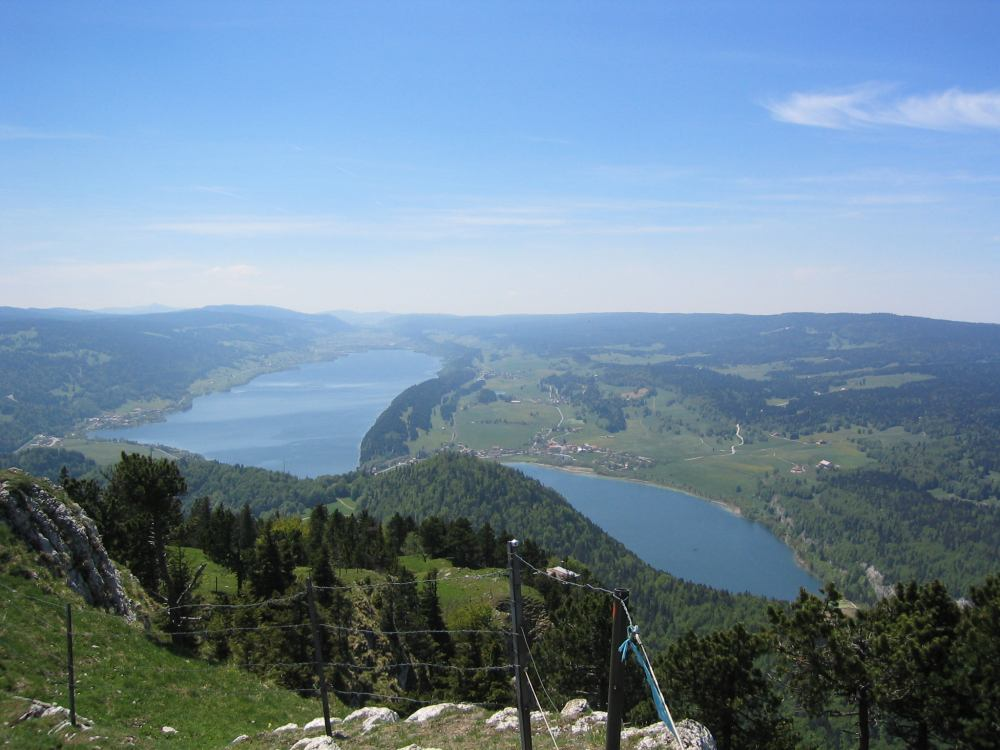
Lac de Joux and lac Brenet, Vallée de Joux, picture taken from the Dent de Vaulion

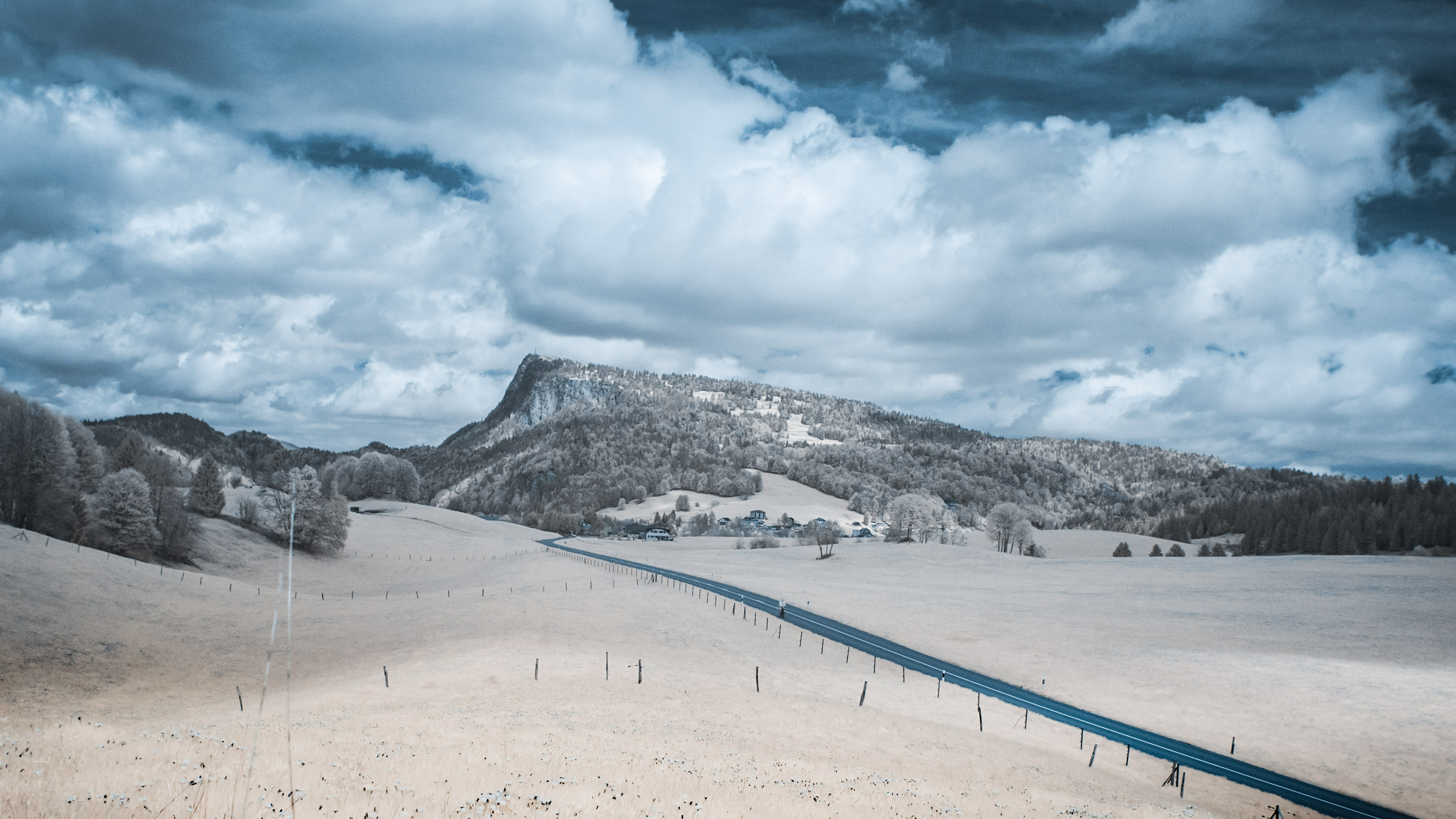
Infrared photography of the Dent de Vaulion taken in the Vallée de Joux.

The Vallée de Joux (French pronunciation: [vale də ʒu]) is a valley of the Jura Mountains mainly in the Swiss Canton of Vaud. The valley also continues into France (Jura département) at its higher, southwestern, end. Located 30 miles (48 km) north of Geneva and northwest of Lausanne, its mean elevation is over 3,300 feet (1,000 m). There are three Swiss lakes in the Vallée de Joux: the lac de Joux (around 6 miles (9.7 km) long), the lac Brenet and Lake Ter. The French border runs along the northern edge of the valley until, about 10 kilometres (6.2 mi) west of the lac de Joux, the base of the valley becomes French territory. The valley then continues to climb gently towards the Lac des Rousses and the ski resort of Les Rousses.

The NE-SW orientation, and the 1,000 metres (3,300 ft) altitude combine to make for an especially cold winter climate. Indeed, the valley is sometimes called the Vaud Siberia. The coldest weather arises when the Bise wind, which comes from the North-East, is blowing.

There are three main municipalities in the valley, le Chenit, le Lieu and l'Abbaye, all part of the Jura-Nord vaudois District. These include ten villages, such as Le Sentier, Le Brassus, Le Lieu and Le Pont.

The Vallée de Joux is, along with Neuchâtel, the birthplace of Swiss horology and it is still the home of the most famous Swiss watch factories, like Audemars Piguet, Blancpain, Breguet, Patek Philippe, Vacheron Constantin and Jaeger-LeCoultre.

== Ski area ==
The Vallée de Joux hosts four ski resorts, a common forfeitary offer is available:

- Dent de Vaulion (2 ski-lifts);
- L'Abbey (4 ski-lifts);
- L'Orient (3 ski-lifts);
- Le Brassus (2 ski-lifts).

Vallée de Joux is the largest ski area in the Swiss Jura.
