= Dent de Vaulion =

Mountain in Switzerland

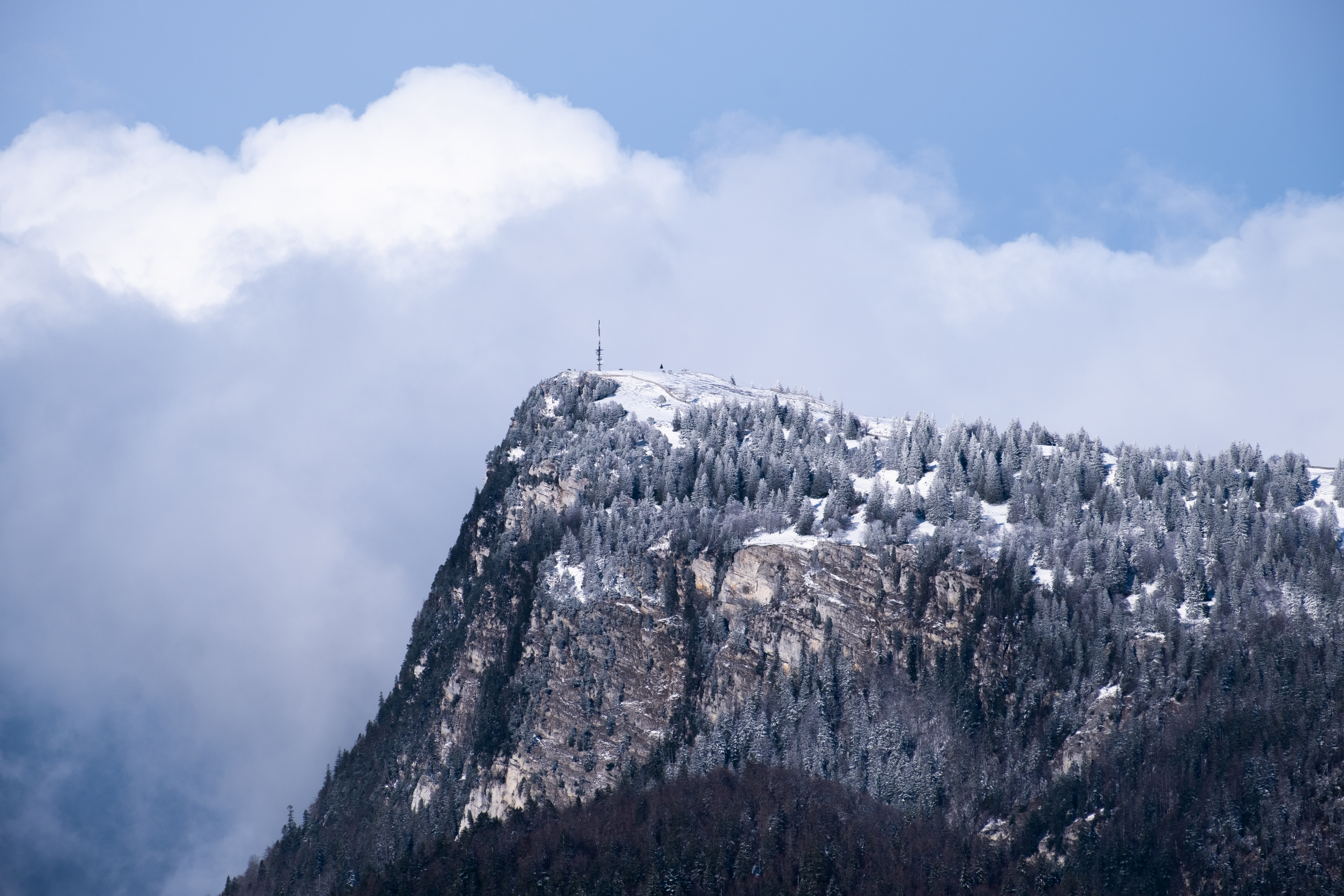
- View from Le Lieu

Highest point
- Elevation: 1,483 m (4,865 ft)
- Prominence: 339 m (1,112 ft)
- Isolation: 7.54 km (4.69 mi)
- Coordinates: 46°41′05″N 06°21′00″E

Geography
- Location within Switzerland
- Location: Vaud, Switzerland
- Parent range: Jura

The Dent de Vaulion (French pronunciation: [dɑ̃ də voljɔ̃]) is a mountain peak of the Swiss Jura, overlooking the lake of Joux and Vaulion in the canton of Vaud.

A small ski resort is located on its slopes. The municipality of Vallorbe is located on the mountain's foothills.

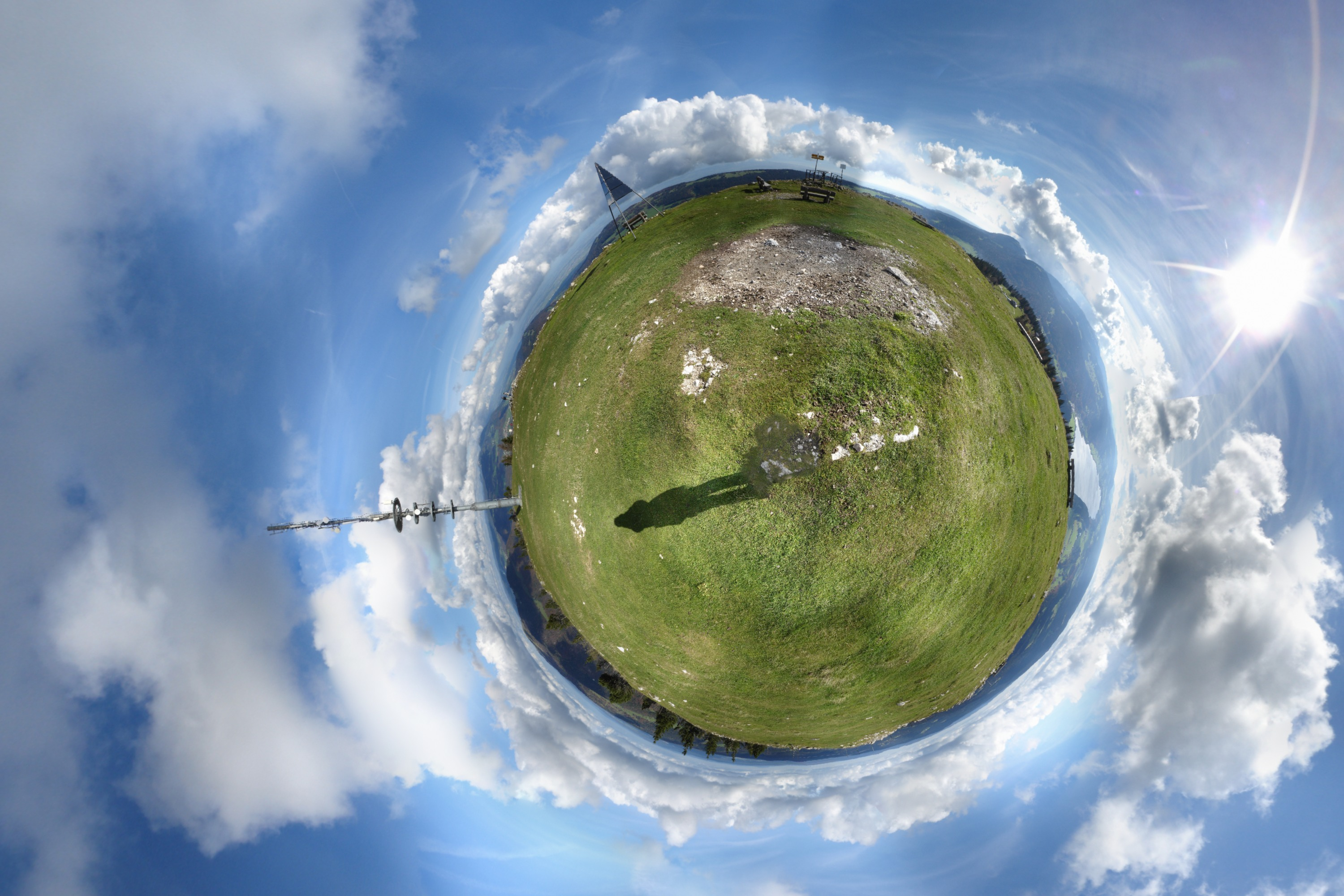
360 degree panorama

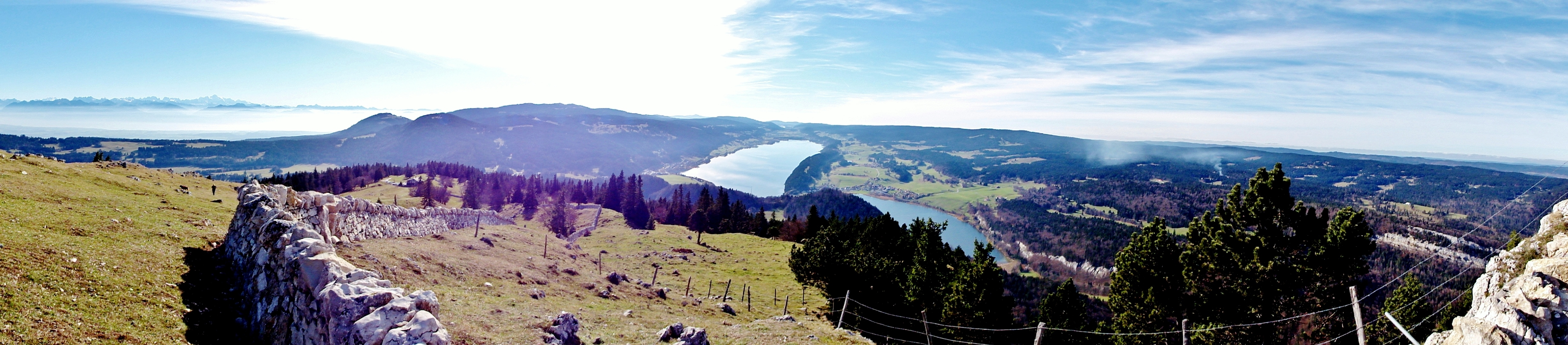
View from Dent de Vaulion a mountain peak of the Swiss Jura (summit 1482,6 m) overlooking the Mont Blanc massif (left side picture) the lakes of Joux and Brenet in the canton of Vaud.
