= L'Abbaye =

- Municipality
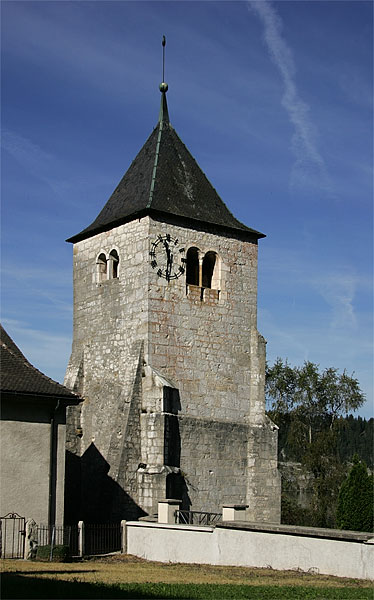
- Church tower of L'Abbaye

- Flag Coat of arms
- Location of L'Abbaye
- Location within Switzerland Location within Canton of Vaud
- Coordinates: 46°39′N 06°19′E
- Country: Switzerland
- Canton: Vaud
- District: Jura-Nord Vaudois

Government
  - Mayor: Syndic

Area
  - Total: 31.88 km^{2} (12.31 sq mi)
- Elevation: 1,014 m (3,327 ft)

Population (2003)
  - Total: 1,243
  - Density: 38.99/km^{2} (101.0/sq mi)
- Time zone: UTC+01:00 (CET)
  - Summer (DST): UTC+02:00 (CEST)
- Postal codes: 1344 L'Abbaye; 1346 Les Bioux; 1342 Le Pont
- SFOS number: 5871
- ISO 3166 code: CH-VD
- Surrounded by: Le Chenit, Le Lieu, L'Isle, Mont-la-Ville, Montricher, Vallorbe, Vaulion
- Website: www.labbaye.ch

L'Abbaye is a municipality in the canton of Vaud, Switzerland, located in the Jura-Nord Vaudois district in the Vallée de Joux. It takes its name from Lac de Joux Abbey, a Premonstratensian monastery.

== History ==
L'Abbaye was created as an independent municipality in 1571 from the municipality of Le Lieu.

== Geography ==
Aerial view (1964)

L'Abbaye has an area, as of 2009, of 31.88 square kilometers (12.31 sq mi). Of this area, 10.83 km^{2} (4.18 sq mi) or 34.0% is used for agricultural purposes, while 19.35 km^{2} (7.47 sq mi) or 60.7% is forested. Of the rest of the land, 1.17 km^{2} (0.45 sq mi) or 3.7% is settled (buildings or roads), 0.31 km^{2} (0.12 sq mi) or 1.0% is either rivers or lakes and 0.25 km^{2} (0.097 sq mi) or 0.8% is unproductive land.

Of the built up area, housing and buildings made up 1.9% and transportation infrastructure made up 1.4%. Out of the forested land, 54.2% of the total land area is heavily forested and 6.5% is covered with orchards or small clusters of trees. Of the agricultural land, 0.0% is used for growing crops and 9.3% is pastures and 24.7% is used for alpine pastures. All the water in the municipality is in lakes.

The municipality was part of the La Vallée District until it was dissolved on 31 August 2006, and L'Abbaye became part of the new district of Jura-Nord Vaudois.

The municipality is located on the eastern shore of the Lac de Joux at an elevation of between 1,000 m (3,300 ft) and 1,600 m (5,200 ft). It is located at the heart of the vallé de Joux in the Jura Mountains. It includes also the villages of Les Bioux and Le Pont.

== Coat of arms ==
The blazon of the municipal coat of arms is Or, a Bear's Head sable lined Argent ensigned on a Billet Gules bendwise three Escallops bendwise Or.

== Demographics ==
L'Abbaye has a population (as of December 2020) of 1,474. As of 2008, 12.8% of the population are resident foreign nationals. Over the last 10 years (1999–2009 ) the population has changed at a rate of 4.1%. It has changed at a rate of 5.2% due to migration and at a rate of -1.1% due to births and deaths.

Most of the population (as of 2000) speaks French (1,226 or 94.0%), with German being second most common (33 or 2.5%) and Portuguese being third (19 or 1.5%). There are 14 people who speak Italian.

Of the population in the municipality 428 or about 32.8% were born in L'Abbaye and lived there in 2000. There were 426 or 32.7% who were born in the same canton, while 154 or 11.8% were born somewhere else in Switzerland, and 200 or 15.3% were born outside of Switzerland.

In 2008 there were 7 live births to Swiss citizens and 2 births to non-Swiss citizens, and in same time span there were 15 deaths of Swiss citizens. Ignoring immigration and emigration, the population of Swiss citizens decreased by 8 while the foreign population increased by 2. There were 2 Swiss men and 3 Swiss women who immigrated back to Switzerland. At the same time, there were 2 non-Swiss men and 3 non-Swiss women who immigrated from another country to Switzerland. The total Swiss population change in 2008 (from all sources, including moves across municipal borders) was an increase of 5 and the non-Swiss population increased by 9 people. This represents a population growth rate of 1.1%.

The age distribution, as of 2009, in L'Abbaye is; 120 children or 9.4% of the population are between 0 and 9 years old and 170 teenagers or 13.3% are between 10 and 19. Of the adult population, 120 people or 9.4% of the population are between 20 and 29 years old. 135 people or 10.5% are between 30 and 39, 199 people or 15.5% are between 40 and 49, and 188 people or 14.7% are between 50 and 59. The senior population distribution is 156 people or 12.2% of the population are between 60 and 69 years old, 113 people or 8.8% are between 70 and 79, there are 71 people or 5.5% who are between 80 and 89, and there are 10 people or 0.8% who are 90 and older.

As of 2000, there were 476 people who were single and never married in the municipality. There were 662 married individuals, 102 widows or widowers and 64 individuals who are divorced.

As of 2000, there were 569 private households in the municipality, and an average of 2.2 persons per household. There were 219 households that consist of only one person and 39 households with five or more people. Out of a total of 602 households that answered this question, 36.4% were households made up of just one person. Of the rest of the households, there are 173 married couples without children, 150 married couples with children There were 21 single parents with a child or children. There were 6 households that were made up of unrelated people and 33 households that were made up of some sort of institution or another collective housing.

In 2000 there were 262 single family homes (or 58.9% of the total) out of a total of 445 inhabited buildings. There were 107 multi-family buildings (24.0%), along with 43 multi-purpose buildings that were mostly used for housing (9.7%) and 33 other use buildings (commercial or industrial) that also had some housing (7.4%). Of the single family homes 59 were built before 1919, while 24 were built between 1990 and 2000. The most multi-family homes (59) were built before 1919 and the next most (16) were built between 1961 and 1970. There was 1 multi-family house built between 1996 and 2000.

In 2000 there were 760 apartments in the municipality. The most common apartment size was 3 rooms of which there were 231. There were 32 single room apartments and 195 apartments with five or more rooms. Of these apartments, a total of 541 apartments (71.2% of the total) were permanently occupied, while 177 apartments (23.3%) were seasonally occupied and 42 apartments (5.5%) were empty. As of 2009, the construction rate of new housing units was 1.6 new units per 1000 residents. The vacancy rate for the municipality, in 2010, was 0.63%.

The historical population is given in the following chart:

== Heritage sites of national significance ==
The Manoir De Haute Roche is listed as a Swiss heritage site of national significance. The entire village of Le Pont is part of the Inventory of Swiss Heritage Sites.

== Politics ==
In the 2007 federal election the most popular party was the SP which received 21.98% of the vote. The next three most popular parties were the SVP (17.84%), the LPS Party (14.87%) and the FDP (13.81%). In the federal election, a total of 399 votes were cast, and the voter turnout was 45.7%.

== Economy ==
As of 2010, L'Abbaye had an unemployment rate of 3.5%. As of 2008, there were 28 people employed in the primary economic sector and about 9 businesses involved in this sector. 926 people were employed in the secondary sector and there were 23 businesses in this sector. 182 people were employed in the tertiary sector, with 43 businesses in this sector. There were 627 residents of the municipality who were employed in some capacity, of which females made up 42.3% of the workforce.

In 2008 the total number of full-time equivalent jobs was 1,059. The number of jobs in the primary sector was 17, all of which were in agriculture. The number of jobs in the secondary sector was 888 of which 826 or (93.0%) were in manufacturing, 12 or (1.4%) were in mining and 49 (5.5%) were in construction. The number of jobs in the tertiary sector was 154. In the tertiary sector; 40 or 26.0% were in wholesale or retail sales or the repair of motor vehicles, 38 or 24.7% were in the movement and storage of goods, 37 or 24.0% were in a hotel or restaurant, 1 was in the information industry, 1 was the insurance or financial industry, 2 or 1.3% were technical professionals or scientists, 2 or 1.3% were in education and 11 or 7.1% were in health care.

In 2000, there were 403 workers who commuted into the municipality and 384 workers who commuted away. The municipality is a net importer of workers, with about 1.0 workers entering the municipality for every one leaving. About 33.3% of the workforce coming into L'Abbaye are coming from outside Switzerland. Of the working population, 7% used public transportation to get to work, and 69.5% used a private car.

== Religion ==
From the 2000 census, 269 or 20.6% were Roman Catholic, while 618 or 47.4% belonged to the Swiss Reformed Church. Of the rest of the population, there was 1 member of an Orthodox church, and there were 222 individuals (or about 17.02% of the population) who belonged to another Christian church. There were 3 (or about 0.23% of the population) who were Islamic. There were 5 individuals who belonged to another church. 164 (or about 12.58% of the population) belonged to no church, are agnostic or atheist, and 132 individuals (or about 10.12% of the population) did not answer the question.

== Education ==
In L'Abbaye about 429 or (32.9%) of the population have completed non-mandatory upper secondary education, and 142 or (10.9%) have completed additional higher education (either university or a Fachhochschule). Of the 142 who completed tertiary schooling, 68.3% were Swiss men, 19.7% were Swiss women, 7.7% were non-Swiss men and 4.2% were non-Swiss women.

In the 2009/2010 school year there were a total of 146 students in the L'Abbaye school district. In the Vaud cantonal school system, two years of non-obligatory pre-school are provided by the political districts. During the school year, the political district provided pre-school care for a total of 578 children of which 359 children (62.1%) received subsidized pre-school care. The canton's primary school program requires students to attend for four years. There were 67 students in the municipal primary school program. The obligatory lower secondary school program lasts for six years and there were 78 students in those schools. There were also 1 students who were home schooled or attended another non-traditional school.

As of 2000, there were 3 students in L'Abbaye who came from another municipality, while 141 residents attended schools outside the municipality.
