= Lac de Joux =

Lake in Vaud, Switzerland

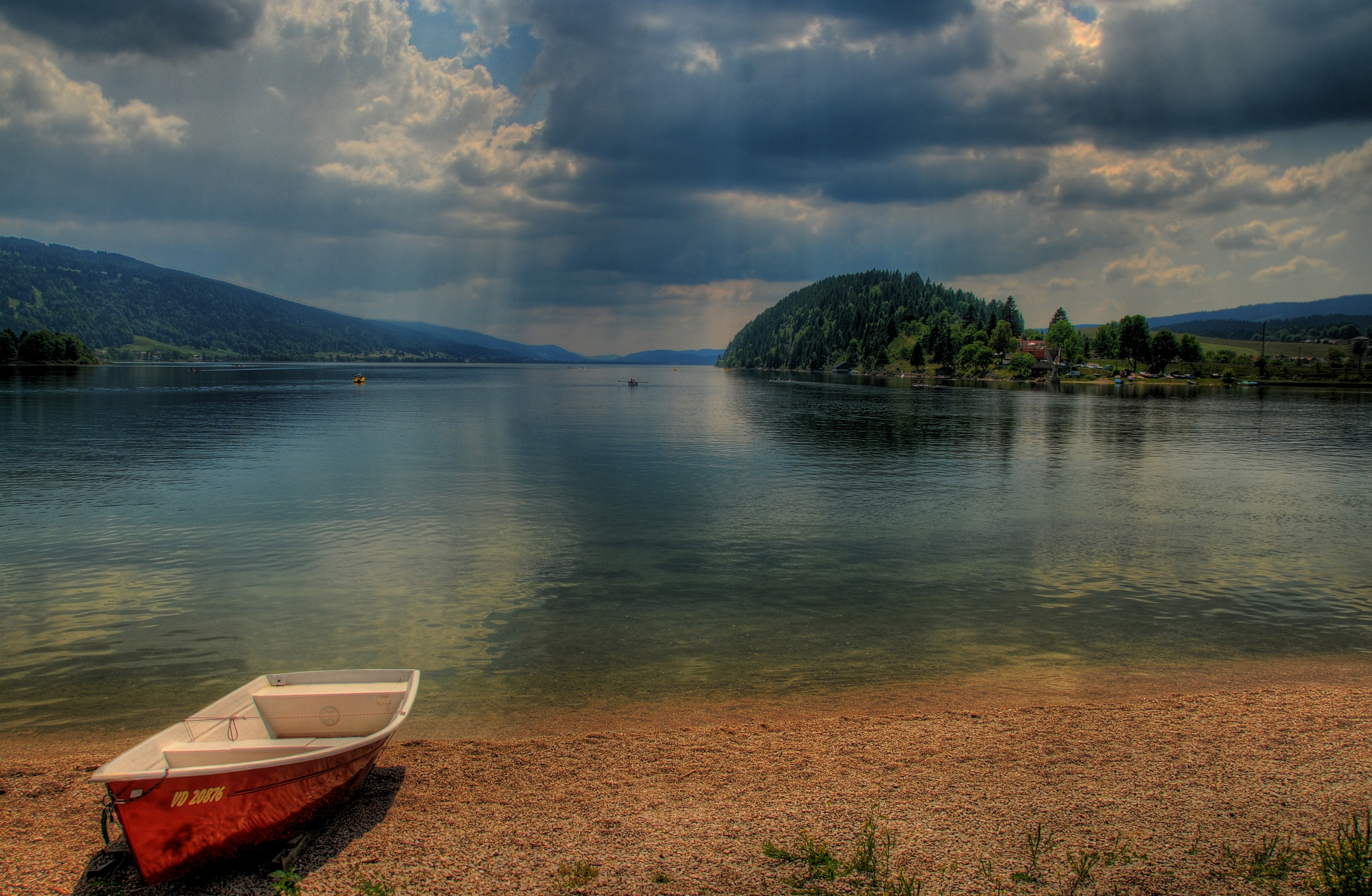
- View from the north eastern shore at Le Pont.

- Location within Canton of Vaud Location within Switzerland Location within Alps
- Interactive map of Lac de Joux
- Location: Vallée de Joux, Vaud, Switzerland
- Coordinates: 46°38′16″N 6°17′4″E
- Primary inflows: Orbe
- Primary outflows: (Orbe)
- Basin countries: Switzerland, France
- Max. length: 9 km (5.6 mi)
- Max. width: 1 km (0.62 mi)
- Surface area: 8.77 km^{2} (3.39 sq mi)
- Max. depth: 32 m (105 ft)
- Surface elevation: 1,004 m (3,294 ft)
- Settlements: Le Chenit, L'Abbaye, Le Pont

Lac de Joux (French pronunciation: [lak də ʒu]) is a lake in the Vallée de Joux in the Canton of Vaud, Switzerland. With a surface area of 9.5 km^{2}, it is the largest lake in Switzerland lying above 1,000 metres. Lac de Joux is located in the Jura Mountains.

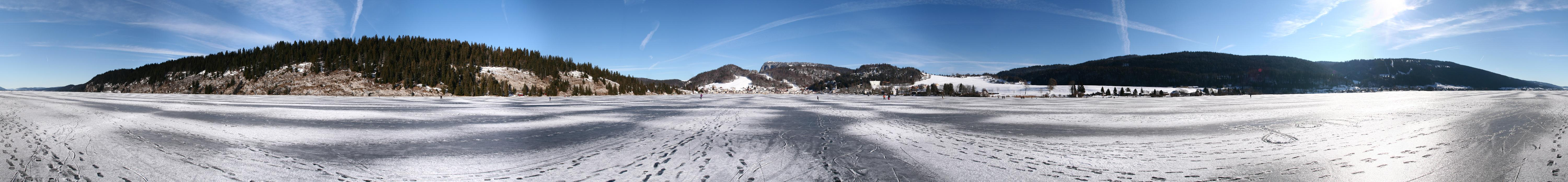
Lac de Joux (jan. 2008)

== See also ==
- List of lakes of Switzerland
- List of mountain lakes of Switzerland
