= List of watch manufacturers =

The following is a list of watch manufacturers.

== Watchmakers ==
This list is a duplicate of Category:Watch brands, which will likely be more up-to-date and complete. Manufacturers that are named after the founder are sorted by surname. Names in this list require an article about the watch brand or watchmaker.

== 0–9 ==
- 88 Rue du Rhone

== A ==
- A. Lange & Söhne
- Accurist
- Adidas
- ADINA Watches
- Adriatica
- Étienne Aigner
- A.L.B
- Alba
- Anonimo
- Ansonia
- Apple
- Aquastar
- Aragon
- Arcadia Watches
- Armand Nicolet
- Armani Exchange
- Armitron
- Arnold & Son
- ASUAG
- Audemars Piguet
- Ateliers deMonaco

== B ==
- Backes & Strauss
- Bausele
- Ball Watch Company
- Webb C. Ball
- Balmain
- Baume & Mercier
- Bedat & Co
- Beijing Watch Factory
- Bell & Ross
- Benetton Group
- Benrus
- Bianchet
- Binda Group
- BKL UF
- Blancpain
- Blumarine
- Ernest Borel
- Bovet Fleurier
- Édouard Bovet
- Bozeman Watch Company
- Abraham-Louis Breguet
- Breguet
- Breil
- Breitling
- Bremont Watch Company
- Gustav Bruemmer
- Buccellati
- Bulgari
- Bulova
- Burberry

== C ==
- Cabot Watch Company
- Calvin Klein
- Candino
- Carl F. Bucherer
- Cartier
- Casio
- Catorex
- Cecil Purnell
- Century Time Gems Ltd
- Certina
- Cerutti
- Chanel
- Charles Jourdan
- Charriol
- Chaumet
- Konstantin Chaykin
- Chopard
- Christian Jacques
- Christopher Ward
- Chronosport
- Chronoswiss
- Chung Nam
- Citizen
- Concord watch
- Corum
- Condor
- Curtis Australia
- Cyma Watches
- Czapek & Cie

== D ==
- D1 Milano
- Damasko
- Damiani
- Dan Henry Watches
- Daniel Wellington
- George Daniels
- Aaron Lufkin Dennison
- Dent (watchmaker)
- Diesel
- Dior
- DKNY
- Dolce & Gabbana
- D. Dornblüth & Sohn
- Doxa
- Dreffa
- Dubey Schaldenbrand
- Roger Dubuis
- Dueber-Hampden

== E ==
- Thomas Earnshaw
- Ebel
- Eberhard & Co.
- Edox
- Etienne Aigner
- Elektronika
- Elgin National Watch Company
- Elle
- Emporio Armani
- Epos
- Epson
- Endura
- Louis Erard
- ETA SA
- Esprit
- Eterna

== F ==
- F. P. Journe
- Fastrack
- A. Favre & Fils
- Carlo Ferrara
- Festina
- Favre-Leuba
- Fendi
- Ferragamo
- Fila
- Fortis
- Frédérique Constant
- Fossil, Inc.
- Folli Follie
- Charles Frodsham
- French Connection
- Fitbit
- Franck Muller

== G ==
- GAO Tek
- G-Shock
- Gallet & Co.
- Gant
- Garmin
- Léon Gallet
- Romain Gauthier
- General Watch Co
- Louis George
- Girard-Perregaux
- Glashütte Original
- Glycine Watch SA
- George Graham
- Google LLC
- Graff (jewellers)
- Grand Seiko
- Greubel Forsey
- Moritz Grossmann
- Grovana Watch
- Gruen Watch Co.
- Gucci
- Guess
- Guy Laroche

== H ==
- Halda Watch Company
- Hamilton Watch Company
- Hangzhou Watch Company
- Hanhart
- Hanowa
- Hewlett-Packard
- John Harrison
- Harry Winston, Inc.
- Hermès
- HMT Limited
- H&M
- E. Howard & Co.
- Huawei
- Hublot
- Hugo Boss

== I ==
- IBM
- Ikepod
- Illinois Watch Company
- Ingersoll Watch Company
- International Watch Company (IWC Schaffhausen)
- Invicta Watch Group
- Itay Noy

== J ==
- Jacob & Co
- Jaeger-LeCoultre
- Jaquet Droz
- Jean Perret
- Georg Jensen
- F. P. Journe
- Jowissa
- Junghans
- Junkers
- Jules Jürgensen
- Jorg Gray

== K ==
- Karl Lagerfeld
- Kenneth Cole
- Kenzo
- Kidper
- Kienzle

== L ==
‍
- Lacoste
- Laco Uhrenmanufaktur
- Lancashire Watch Company
- Lang & Heyne
- Lava International
- Laurent Ferrier
- Jean Lassale
- Lee Cooper
- Leijona
- Lemania
- Lenovo
- Lenqin
- Levi Strauss & Co.
- Léon Hatot
- Lilienthal Berlin
- Linde Werdelin
- Lip
- Peter Litherland
- Locman
- Longines
- Lorus
- Lotus
- Louis Erard
- Louis Vuitton
- Luch
- Luminox

== M ==
- Maitres du Temps
- Mango
- Manufacture Royale
- Marc Ecko
- Marc Jacobs
- Maserati
- Mathey-Tissot
- Maurice Lacroix
- MB&F
- MeisterSinger
- Mühle Glashütte
- Melbourne Watch Company
- Michael Kors
- Microsoft
- Mido
- Ming
- Miss Sixty
- Louis Moinet
- Molnija
- Mondaine
- Montblanc
- Montegrappa
- Morellato Group
- Moschino
- H. Moser & Cie
- Mossimo
- Movado
- Moritz Grossmann

== N ==
- Nautica
- Newgate Watches
- Nike Inc.
- Nivada
- Nixon Watches
- Nomos Glashütte

== O ==
- Obrey
- Olio
- Ollech & Wajs
- Omega
- Orfina
- Orient
- Oris
- O bag

== P ==
- Panerai
- Parmigiani Fleurier
- Parnis
- Patek Philippe
- Paul Hewitt
- Pequignet
- Perrelet
- Petrodvorets Watch Factory
- Phenix Watch Company
- Philip Zepter
- Piaget
- Pierre Cardin
- Henry Pitkin
- Pobeda
- Polar
- Police
- Poljot
- Polo Ralph Lauren
- Porsche Design
- Prada
- Polic
- PRIM
- Pulsar
- Purnell

== Q ==
- Q&Q

== R ==
- Rabanne
- Rado
- Raketa
- David Ramsay
- Razer Inc.
- Raymond Weil
- Rebecca Minkoff
- Reebok
- Regina
- Reguladora
- Ressence
- Revue Thommen
- Richard Mille
- Roamer
- Roberto Cavalli
- Rodania
- Roger Dubuis
- Rolex
- Ronda AG
- Rotary Watches
- Daniel Roth

== S ==
- Sandoz watches
- Samsung
- Schwarz Etienne
- Sea-Gull
- Sector
- Seiko
- Seiko Instruments
- Seikosha
- Sekonda
- Shinola Detroit
- Sinn
- SSIH (previous holding company, now integrated into Swatch Group)
- Skagen Designs
- Skechers
- Alexander Shorokhoff
- Slazenger
- Slava watches
- Slow watch
- Roger W. Smith
- SMH (short for Société de Microélectronique et d'Horlogerie previous name of the company issued from the merger of ASUAG & SSIH, now Swatch Group)
- Solvil et Titus
- Sony
- Speake-Marin
- Squale
- Stepan Sarpaneva
- Stowa
- Andreas Strehler
- Superdry
- Suunto
- Swarovski
- Swatch
- Swatch Group

== T ==
- TAG Heuer
- Technos
- Ted Lapidus
- Thierry Mugler
- Seth Thomas
- Thoma
- Thomas Sabo
- Thomas Tompion
- Tianjin Sea-Gull
- Tiffany & Co
- Timberland
- Timex Group
- Tissot
- Titan Watches
- Titoni
- Tommy Hilfiger
- Tourneau
- ToyWatch
- Tudor
- Tutima
- TW Steel

== U ==
- Ulysse Nardin
- Universal Genève
- Urban Jürgensen

== V ==
- Vacheron Constantin
- Vintan
- Vacuum Chronometer Corporation
- Valentino
- Valjoux
- Van Cleef & Arpels
- Ventura
- Versace
- Victorinox
- Visconti
- Vostok watches
- Venezianico

== W ==
- Waltham Watch Company
- Christopher Ward
- Wenger
- Westclox
- West End Watch Co
- WeWOOD
- Joseph Windmills
- Harry Winston
- Wittnauer

== X ==
- Xiaomi

== Y ==
- Yema

== Z ==
- Zenith
- Zeno-Watch Basel
- Zodiac

== See also ==
- List of 24-hour watch brands
- List of clock manufacturers
- List of German watch manufacturers
- List of Swiss watch manufacturers
- List of watchmakers
