= Backes & Strauss =

- Type: Private Company
- Industry: Watchmaking, Jeweller
- Founded: Hanau, Germany (1789)
- Founder: Georg Carl Backes
- Headquarters: London, United Kingdom
- Area served: Asia, Europe, the Middle East, Africa and the Americas
- Key people: Vartkess Knadjian (CEO)
- Products: Watches, diamonds, jewellery
- Divisions: Sarnen, Switzerland (Corporate Headquarters); Genthod, Switzerland
- Website: backesandstrauss.com

Backes & Strauss is an English company that designs and produces high-end timepieces and jewellery. Founded in 1789 in Hanau, Germany, it is the oldest diamond company in the world.

The company's London office was established in 1814, and the company hallmark was registered at Goldsmith's Hall in London in 1878. In November 2006, Backes & Strauss entered into a strategic partnership with the Swiss watchmaker Franck Muller Group, launching its flagship collections of Regent, Berkeley and Piccadilly watches.

== History ==
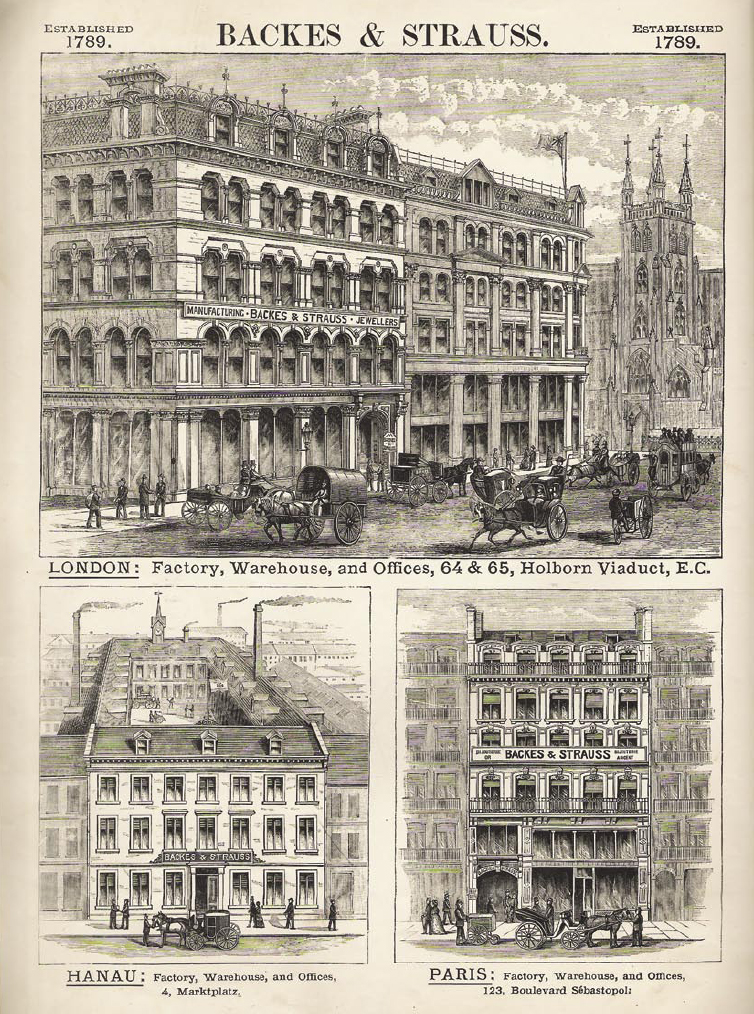
Advertisement featuring offices of Backes & Strauss in London, Hanau and Paris c. 1800s

=== Founding of Backes and Co. : 1789–1855 ===
Founded in 1789, by German immigrant businessmen Georg Carl Backes and (later on) Max Strauss, the company is the oldest diamond company in the world.

By the early 19th century, Georg Carl Backes was a successful goldsmith in the city of Hanau, Germany. During this time, his company (originally named Backes & Co.) had done so well that he sent his 24-year-old son Johann Franz to London to open a new office. After Georg Carl's death in 1819, his son continued trading and manufacturing of diamonds and jewellery. Examples were shown at London's Great Exhibition in 1851 and two pages of its official catalogue were devoted to illustrations of J.F. Backes's jewellery. An Assyrian-style bracelet registered by J. F. Backes & Sons in 1872 can be found in the British Museum.

=== Max Strauss and Global Expansion : 1856–2005 ===
By now, Johann had been joined in the business by his sons, Charles and William and in 1856, the company employed an office boy by the name of Max Strauss. Fifteen years later, Max Strauss was managing J.F. Backes & Co. and in 1873, the company started trading as 'Backes & Strauss'. Manufacturing activities in Britain started in 1877. During that period the hallmark was registered at London's Goldsmiths' Hall in 1878. Charles Backes died in 1890 and two years later, the company decided to concentrate on diamonds. Operating as 'Diamond and Gem merchants', travelling was intensified between 1904 and 1910, especially to shows. In 1953, an office was founded in Antwerp by Gerald Stroud under the direction of Robert Lee and Gustave Ponet.

=== Horological Partnership : 2006–present ===
In November 2006, Backes & Strauss entered into a strategic partnership with the Swiss watchmaker Franck Muller, subsequently showing its watch collection for the first time at the World Presentation of Haute Horlogerie (WPHH) in 2007.

Today, Backes & Strauss is best known for manufacturing high-end diamond and jewel encrusted fine time pieces in conjunction with Swiss luxury watch brand Franck Muller. The main company operations are run from both Mayfair, London and Geneva in Switzerland.

=== Diamond cutting ===
All diamonds at Backes & Strauss are D, E or F colour and internally flawless with only a slight inclusion.

Every Backes & Strauss watch has at least one diamond set into the crown. This is the Backes & Strauss signature, known as the "Jewel in the Crown" and resembles the pavilion, or base, of a diamond.

=== Manufacturing process ===
All Backes & Strauss watches are entirely made in the Geneva workshops of Franck Muller Watchland, where all of the watch components are produced in-house.

== See also ==
- List of companies based in London
- List of watch manufacturers
- Franck Muller
