= Jean Perret =

Swiss watchmaker

Jean Perret Montres SA
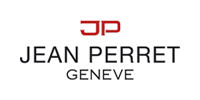
- Company type: Privately held company
- Industry: Watchmaking
- Founded: 1893
- Founder: Jean Perret
- Headquarters: Geneva, Switzerland
- Products: Wristwatches
- Website: www.jeanperret.ch

Jean Perret Montres SA is a Swiss brand of watchmakers founded in Switzerland in 1893.

== History ==
The company was founded by the Geneva-born Designer, Jean Perret in Geneva, Switzerland. His successors had a long history in the watch industry dating back to 1893. In the beginning of the 21st century Jean Perret Montres SA was taken over by a Saudi Arabian investor. Today the company is held privately by a Swiss family.

== Watches ==
The current collection consists of three main lines: the Slim Line, the Doublette, and the Cool Line. Jean Perret watches vary in pricing according to model and materials but range from about US$500 to about US$2,500. Models that include baguette diamonds can cost considerably more.

== See also ==
List of watch manufactures
