= Tianjin Seagull =

Chinese watchmaking company

Tianjin Seagull Watch Group Co., Ltd.
- Industry: Watch
- Founded: 1955
- Headquarters: Tianjin, China
- Products: Mechanical watches, mechanical watch parts, precision machinery
- Owner: state-owned
- Number of employees: 3000 (2011)
- Website: en.seagullwatch.com

Tianjin Seagull Watch Group (Chinese: 天津海鸥), known as Seagull and stylized as SEA-GULL, is a watchmaking company located in Tianjin, China.

== History ==
The company was originally formed as Tianjin Watch Factory in January 1955 by order of the People's Republic of China government, with four craftsmen. According to the company, it manufactured China’s first mechanical watch, the "Five-Star" timepiece, later that year. In 1963, the factory developed the D304, an aviation chronograph for military use, which the company describes as China’s first aviation chronograph.

In 1990, Tianjin Watch Factory was awarded the status of a national company, and in 1992 the Tianjin Seagull Corporation was founded. That same year, the company decided to discontinue mechanical watch production in favour of quartz watches. Five years later, the decision was reversed, and the company has since produced exclusively mechanical movements and watches.

In 2000, Tianjin Seagull Watch Group went public, and in 2003 it opened a representative office in Hong Kong. During the 2000s, the company expanded into high-complication watchmaking, developing in-house tourbillon, minute repeater, and perpetual calendar mechanisms. In 2009, Tianjin Seagull introduced the ST9250 movement, which integrated all three complications into a single timepiece. In 2010, the company moved to new production and administration facilities near Tianjin Airport.

Tianjin Seagull has also developed advanced tourbillons, including a multi-axial orbital tourbillon movement.

In 2024, the company released several anniversary models, including a flying split-second rattrapante chronograph. In 2025, Tianjin Seagull launched its first official global direct-to-consumer website.

== Brands ==
The following brand names were used for watches produced by Tianjin Seagull.

Year	Brand Name
1955-1958	WuXing
1958-1966	WuYi
1966-1974	Dong Feng (East Wind)
1974–present	Seagull

== Gallery ==
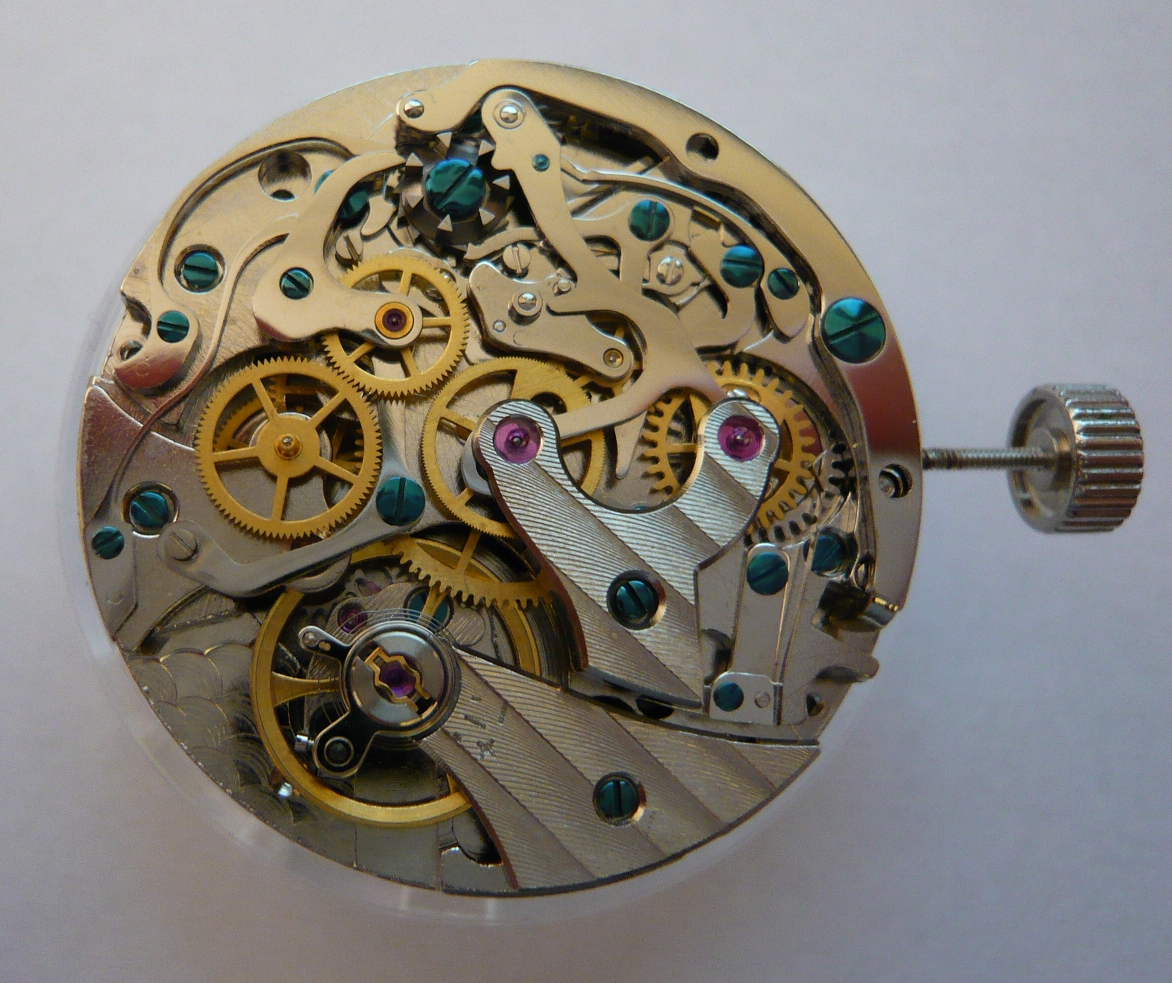
ST19 Chronograph Movement produced by Tianjin Seagull Watch Group

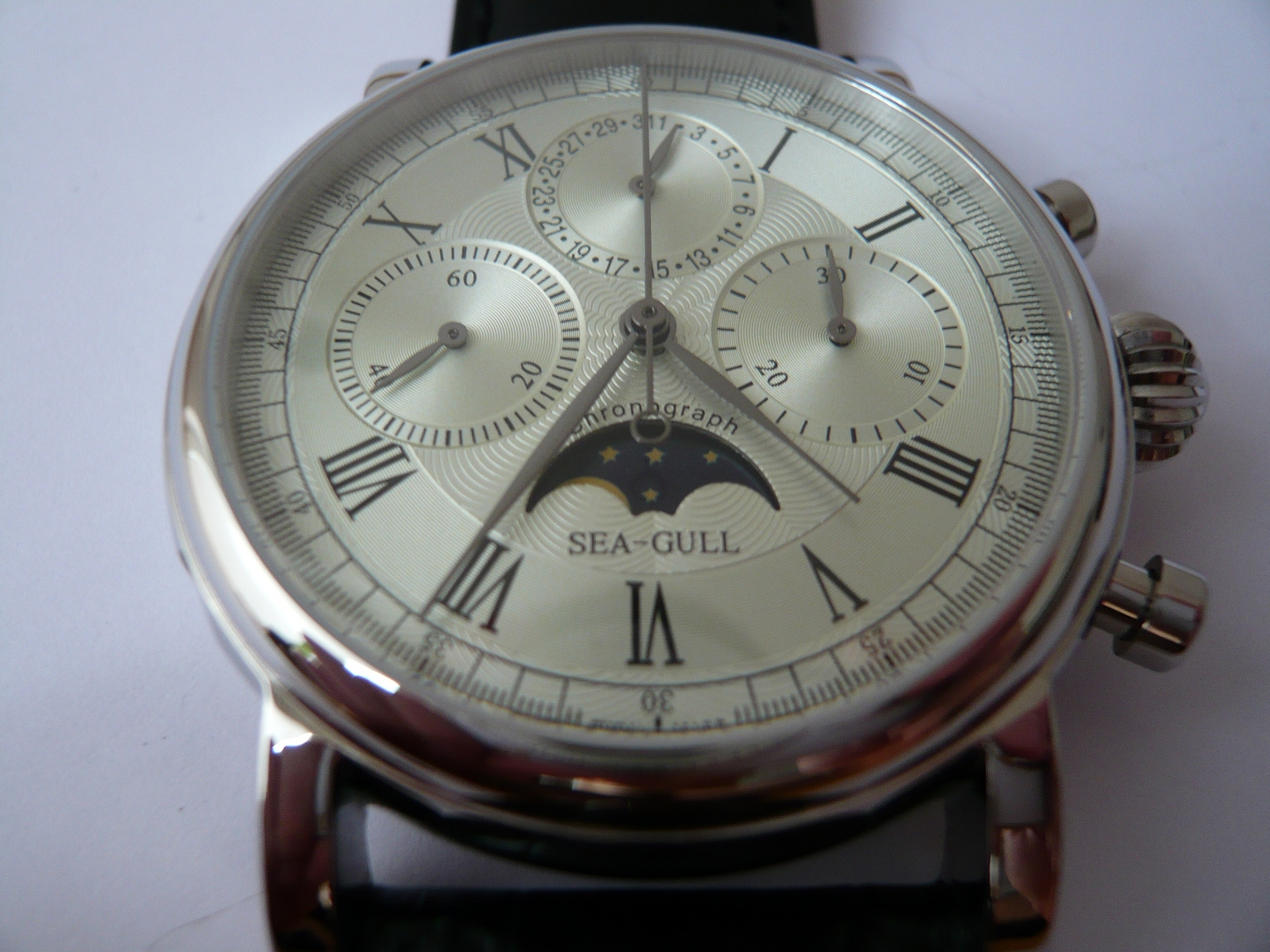
Seagull branded Wristwatch

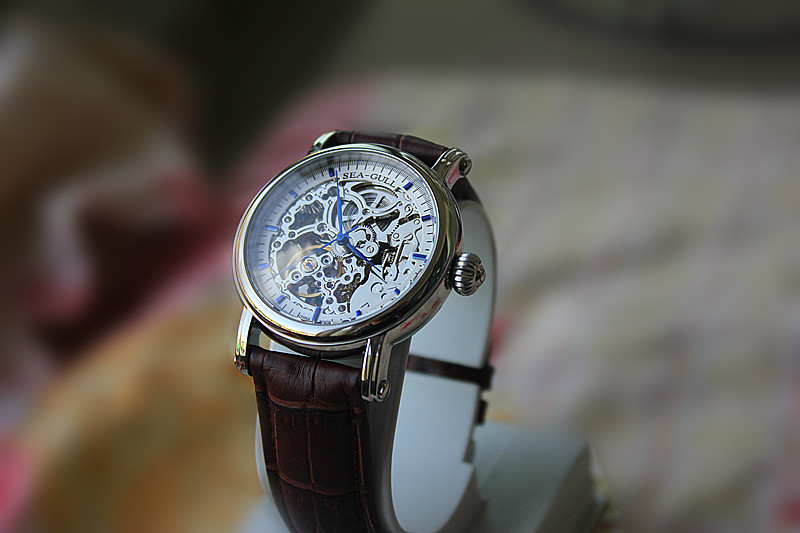
Modern Seagull M182SK

== See also ==
- Chinese standard movement
