= Luch (watchmaker) =

Belarusian watch brand

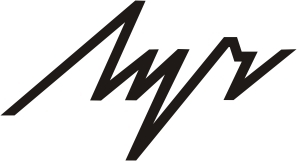

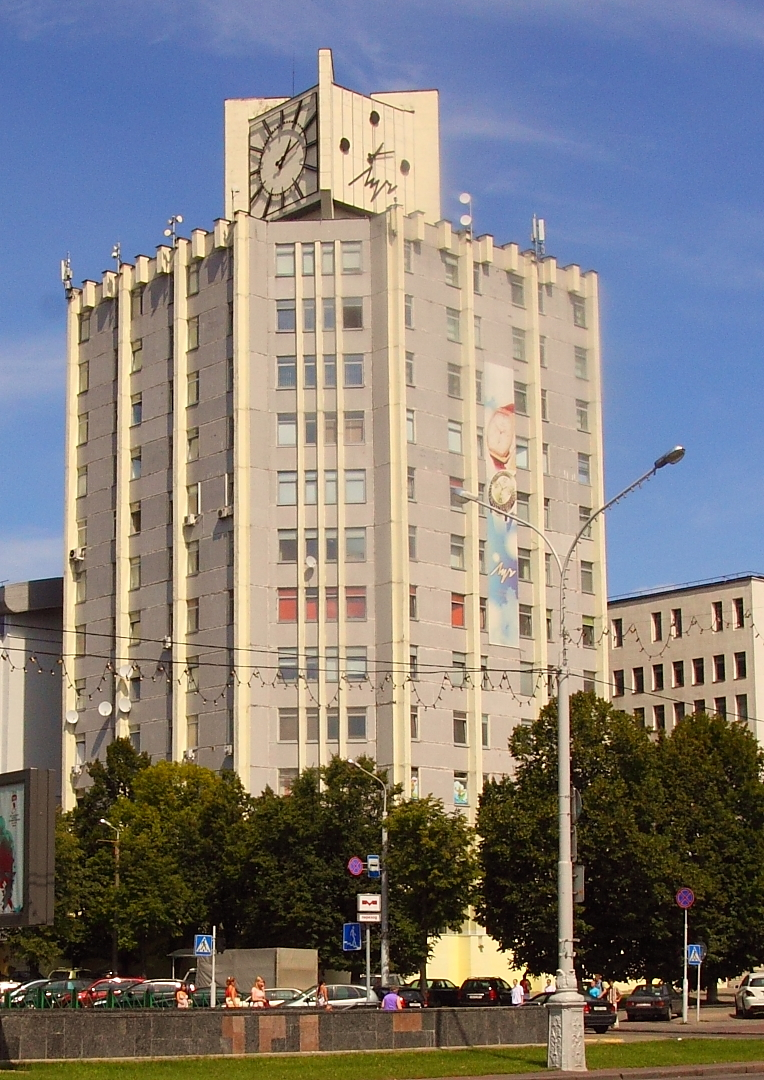
- Minsk Watch Factory
- Genre: Watchmaker
- Founded: 1953
- Headquarters: Minsk, Belarus
- Products: Wristwatches
- Website: luch.by

Luch (Belarusian: Луч, ray, beam) is a watch brand produced by the OJSC Minsk Watch Plant, the only watch plant in Belarus. The decision to build the plant was taken in 1953, and from 1955 watches were produced in Minsk, including the brands Luch, Zarya and Vympel. After the collapse of the Soviet Union and eventual bankruptcy, the Swiss company Franck Muller became a majority investor in the Minsk Watch Plant to revive the Luch brand.

== History ==
The Minsk watch factory was established on December 17, 1953. In 1955, the factory produced its first watch with the movement supplied by the Penza-based Zarya watch factory. As the Minsk factory went fully operational 10 years later, it maintained the full production cycle. By 1980s, it manufactured over 4.5 million watches each year. Since the early 1980s, it produced quartz movements in addition to mechanical movements and supplied movements and other electronic components to many other Soviet watch factories.

Following the collapse of the Soviet Union, Minsk factory suffered the same fate as many other watch factories, as it lost its distribution channels. Between 1991 and 2005, its production volume dropped from 3.8 million to 50,000 timepieces per year. The factory was privatized in 1996, went bankrupt in 2006, and was nationalized in 2009. In the 2010s, the Government of Belarus entered a partnership with Franck Muller to revive the watch production. The Swiss company invested over USD 4 million in five years to improve the production line and switched the distribution focus from the Belarus and post-Soviet states to the Western Europe and the rest of the world.

== Production ==
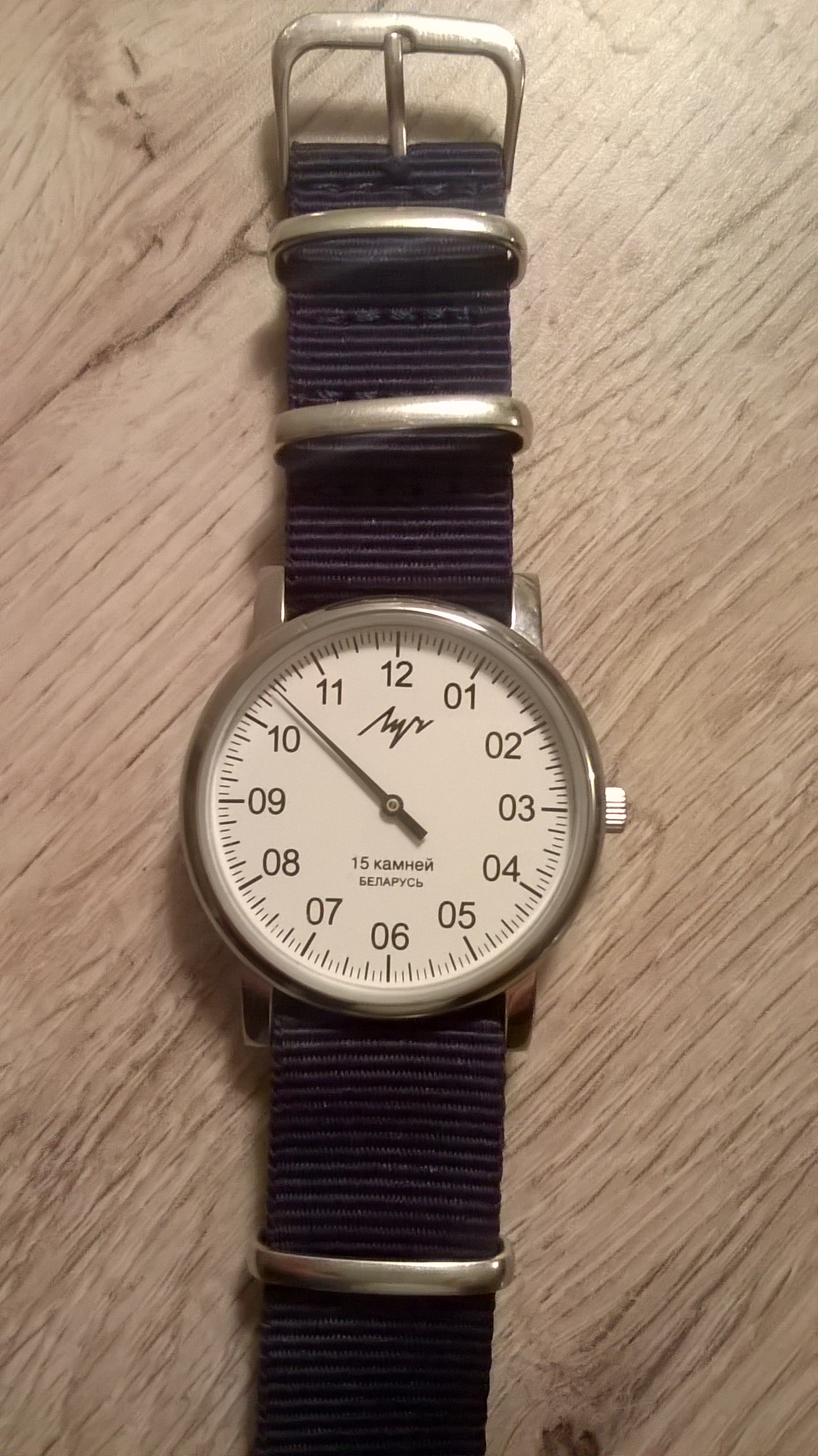
One-handed Luch watch

The Minsk watch factory kept the full production cycle and supplies components to other watch manufacturers. The quality control process lasts a week for quartz watches and up to 13 days for mechanical watches. The factory develops up to 18 new designs per year.

In 2013, between 10,000 and 15,000 Luch watches were being produced by the Minsk factory per month. By 2024, the factory had scaled down production to 6,000 watches per month.

== Designs ==
Since its launch, the Minsk watch factory developed over 1,700 models of watches. Following the acquisition by Franck Muller, the factory continued to produce its iconic Vympel and Zarya models and introduced new designs based on classical Luch brand identity (such as Luch-1800 and Luch-2209, Luch-2516). In addition to inexpensive watches, the factory manufactured a number of luxury models with more sophisticated designs.

During the 1980s, the Minsk watch factory produced both mechanical and quartz watches using in-house movements. The microelectronics used in the quartz movements were manufactured at the factory itself. The factory was unable to sustain the production of an in-house quartz movement due to financial difficulties and had permanently switched to assembling watches with imported foreign quartz movements by the late 2000s.

In 2018, around 60% of watches produced by Minsk watch factory used its in-house mechanical movement. The quartz and automatic movements used in Luch watches are supplied by Japanese and Swiss companies. The company's R&D and design team consisted of around 30 specialists.

== Distribution ==
In 2018, the Minsk watch factory operated 17 brand stores in Belarus, including seven stores in Minsk.

== Museum ==
In 2020, the Minsk watch factory museum was opened with a collection dedicated to the history of Luch brand. In 2023, the second museum dedicated to the technologies of watchmaking was opened at the factory.
