= Dan Henry Watches =

Watch manufacturer

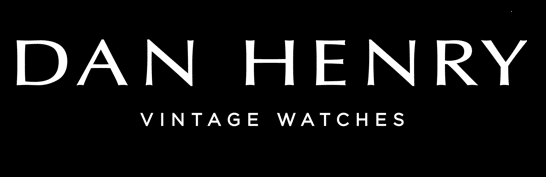
- Founded: 20 September 2016
- Founder: Dan Henry
- Headquarters: United States
- Website: danhenrywatches.com

Dan Henry Watches is a microbrand wristwatch manufacturer. The company was founded in 2016 by Dan Henry, a watch collector with more than 1,500 vintage timepieces in his collection. Henry also runs an interactive website called Timeline.Watch, providing information on vintage watches.

== Products ==
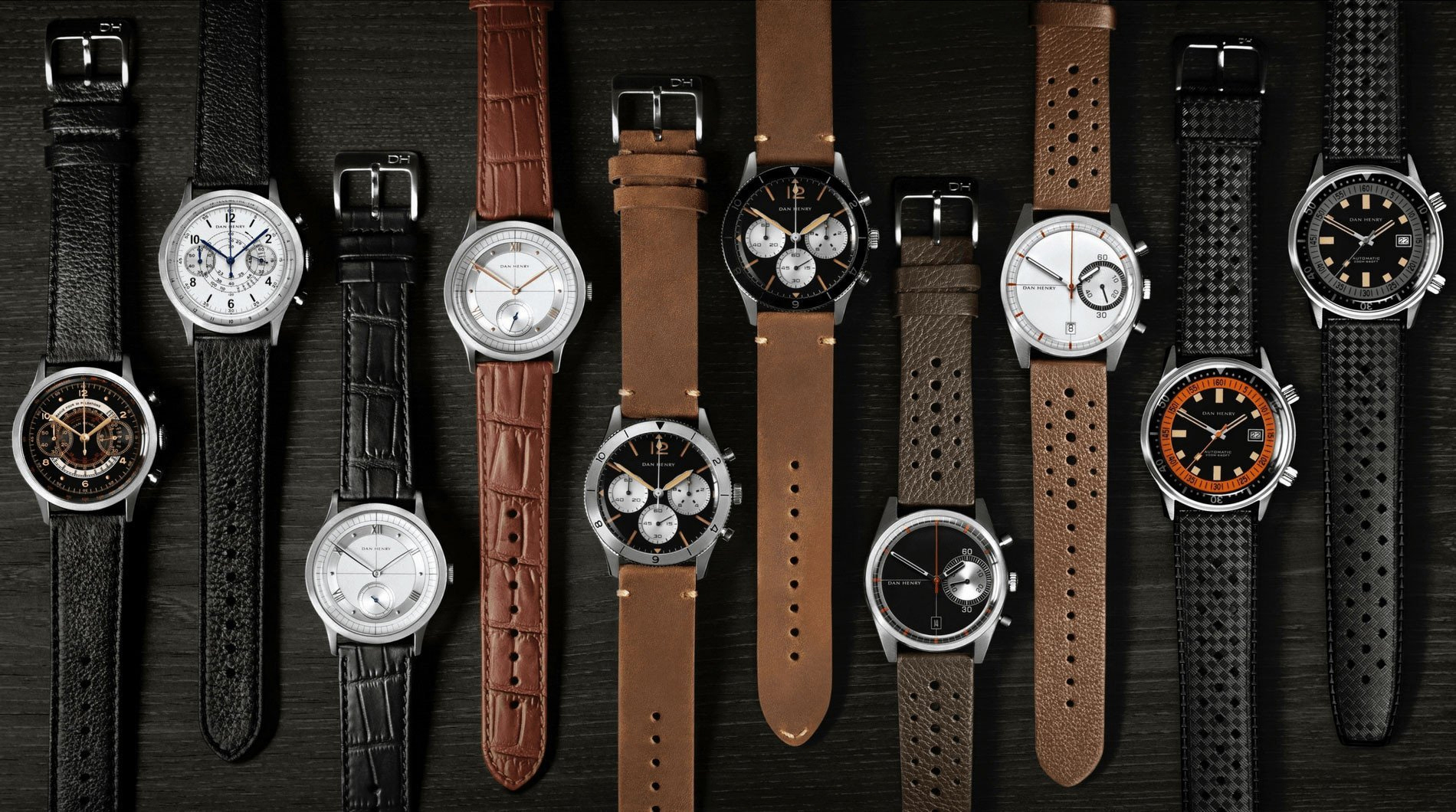
The first five models released by Dan Henry Watches, each produced in two versions.

In September 2016, Henry released his first line of watches: four models that Sofrep.com said "pay homage to the vintage styles of the 1930s, 1940s, 1960s and 1970s." These were the 1947 Dress Watch, the 1963 Pilot Chronograph, the 1968 Dragster Chrono and the 1970 Automatic Diver Watch.

== See also ==
- List of watch manufacturers
