= Beijing Watch Factory =

Chinese watchmaking company

- Industry: Watch
- Founded: 1958
- Headquarters: Beijing, China
- Products: Mechanical watches, mechanical watch parts, precision machinery
- Owner: Private
- Number of employees: 600 (2013)
- Parent: Fiyta
- Website: en.beijingwatch.com

The Beijing Watch (Chinese: 北京手表厂) is a watchmaking company located in Beijing, China. Founded in 1958, it is a producer of high-end watches, watch movements, and components.

== History ==
Beijing Watch is one of the historic top 3 manufacturers of watches in China along with Sea-Gull and Shanghai. It was initially State-owned, catering to the high-level officials, and became privately-owned in 2004.

In October 2016 the Shenzhen-based watch manufacturer Fiyta took over ownership of Beijing Watch.

== Historic models ==
- Tiananmen Watch June 4, 1989

== See also ==
- Chinese standard movement
