= Hangzhou Watch Company =

Chinese watchmaking company

Hangzhou Watch Co. Ltd.
- Industry: Watch
- Founded: 1972
- Headquarters: Hangzhou, China
- Products: Mechanical watches, mechanical watch parts, precision machinery
- Owner: State-owned
- Number of employees: 700
- Website: www.hzwatch.com.cn

The Hangzhou Watch Company is a watchmaking company in Hangzhou, China. Founded in 1972, its production range includes watches, watch movements and components.

== History ==
The Hangzhou Watch Factory was established in the city of Hangzhou in 1972 with export rights granted from the outset. Initial production was the Standard watch, designated ZHZ with 19 jewels and branded Xihu (West Lake) after the famous landmark near the city. Xihu watches were at one time awarded the top national award for quality.

As resources permitted, the factory introduced a new woman-sized watch with an in-house designed small calibre. These watches were also branded Xihu, and that name was also engraved on the movement. In the 1980s, the factory introduced an automatic Xihu watch. This was a man-sized watch, but the movement was based on the small Xihu calibre with an enlarged dial plate and a very simple auto-winding module with a large rotor.

The changing demands of the market required a higher grade of automatic movement, the 2 Series (2xxx), which was developed based on the older Seiko calibre 7009 design, but with some detail differences such as a smaller balance wheel. Almost no parts are interchangeable between Seiko and Hangzhou calibres. Besides the basic date and day/date versions, there are also skeleton, triple-date, dual-time and jump-hour versions. The 2000 calibres have been used by many international brands, including Orion (Russia) and Stuhrling (with calibres designated 'Lexus').

The Hangzhou Watch Company is now partnered with PTS Resources, Hong Kong. This has enhanced the company through investment in new PTS calibre designs and has expanded Hangzhou's customer base.

The watches manufactured by the Hangzhou Watch Company are branded Farrere.

== Hangzhou Calibers ==
(movements have 4 digit/letter model numbers starting with the "Series" number)

| 2 Series: | Based on the Seiko 7009. Many complications are available, ~36 hr power reserve, 21,600 bph. |
| 3 Series: | Hand-wind tourbillon movements, in numerous complications, variants and finishes, 28,800 bph. |
| 5 Series: | Micro-rotor automatic for slim cases, ~42 hr power reserve, 28,800 bph. |
| 6 Series: | ETA 2824 clone, 28,800 bph. |
| 7 Series: | Clean sheet design, with 75 to 80 hour Power Reserve, 28,800 bph. |
| 9 Series: | Clone of ETA-Unitas 6497 and 6498, with skeleton, calendar and dual-time versions, 18,000 bph. |

== Brands ==
Xihu, Farrere

== See also ==
- Chinese standard movement
