= Schwarz Etienne =

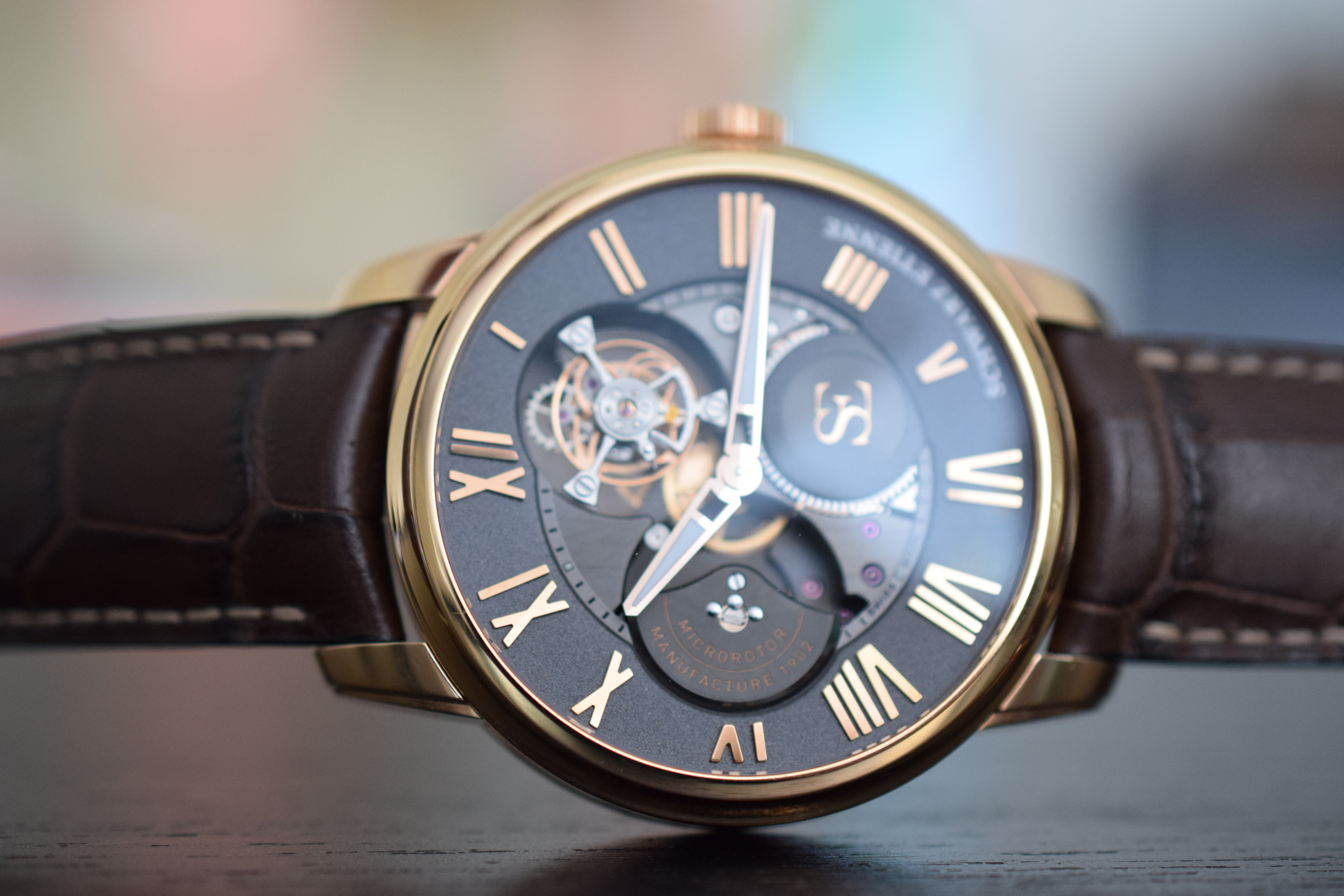
- Type: Privately held company
- Industry: Watchmaking
- Founded: 1902
- Founder: Paul Arthur Schwarz and Olga Etienne
- Headquarters: La Chaux-de-Fonds, Switzerland
- Products: Wristwatches
- Website: www.schwarz-etienne.ch

Schwarz Etienne is a Swiss luxury watch brand, founded in 1902 by Paul Arthur Schwarz and his wife Olga Etienne.

== History ==
In 1902, Paul Arthur Schwarz and his wife Olga Etienne created Schwarz Etienne, a fabrique in La Chaux-de-Fonds whose name is a combination of their surnames. The company owned brands such as Venus or Alpha. The brand was acquired in 2003 by Raffaello Radicchi who soon initiated an action a plan to develop and produce movements in-house.

== Watches ==
Modern watches of the brand are Haute Horlogerie, manufactured in-house including their movements. At BaselWorld 2017, the brand introduced a Tourbillon with retrograde seconds indication.

== See also ==
- List of watch manufacturers
