= D1 Milano =

United Arab Emirates/ Chinese watch manufacturer

- Company type: Privately held company
- Industry: Watch manufacturing
- Founded: 2013; 13 years ago in Milan, Italy
- Headquarters: Dubai and Hong Kong
- Key people: Dario Spallone - (President & CEO)
- Products: Fashion Watches
- Website: www.d1milano.com

D1 Milano is a design object brand from Milan and watch manufacturer. The company was founded in Milan in 2013.

== History ==
The company was started by Dario Spallone in 2013, who currently heads the company as President & CEO. During his interview by Snap Italy Magazine, Dario Spallone defines the unique customer experience of D1 milano, as the added value that distinguishes his brand from the others.

Founded in Milan during the 2013 Milan Fashion Week, it became part of Bocconi University's business incubator in 2014, and moved its headquarter to the Dubai Design District in 2015.

Currently D1 Milano has headquarters in Dubai and Hong Kong and is distributed in 28 countries including retailers such as Selfridges, Harvey Nichols, Lane Crawford, Galeries Lafayette and seven Directly Operated Stores in Bahrain, Dubai, Japan, Lebanon, Panama and Brazil.

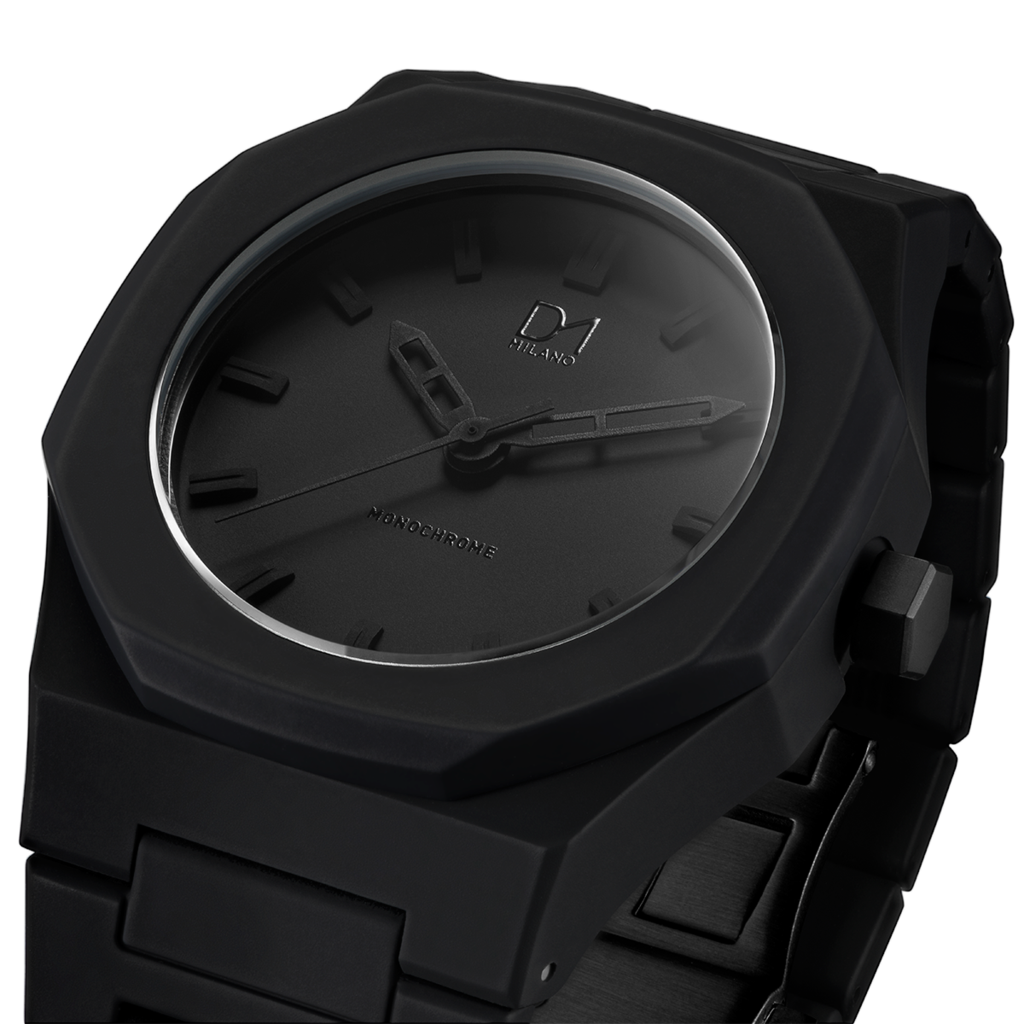
Monochrome Black D1 Milano

The company has been featured in several fashion magazines such as: Vogue (magazine), Elle (magazine), GQ, L'Officiel, Forbes, Vanity Fair, Millionaire, and Esquire Middle East.

The brand introduced watches that change color with temperature variations.
