= Thoma =

Thoma is a version of Thomas, originating from Aramaic t’om’a, meaning ‘twin’, and may refer to:

- Antonius von Thoma (1829–1897), German Roman Catholic archbishop
- Annette Thoma (1886–1974), German composer
- Busso Thoma (1899–1945), German army officer; hanged for his part in the July 20 assassination attempt on Hitler
- Dan J. Thoma (b. 1963), American metallurgist and professor
- Delvin Thoma (b. 1983), Nauruan politician
- Dieter Thoma (b. 1969), German Olympic ski jumper
- Georg Thoma (b. 1937), German Olympic skier
- Godfrey Thoma (b. 1957), Nauruan politician
- Hans Thoma (1839–1924), German artist
- Hans Thoma (engineer), Germany engineer, inventor of the bent-axis axial piston pump/motor, the "Thoma-design", USPTO patent No. 2155455, 1935.
- Heini Thoma (1900–1982), Swiss Olympic rower
- Ludwig Thoma (1867–1921), German author, editor, and publisher
- Maralyn Thoma, American soap opera television writer
- Ruby Thoma (b. 1949), Nauruan politician
- Stefan Thoma (born 1988), German politician
- Thoma (scholar) (died 1127), Moorish Spaniard author and scholar
- Thoma, a character in 2020 video game Genshin Impact
- Thoma Avenir, one of the main characters in the manga Magical Record Lyrical Nanoha Force
- Wilhelm Ritter von Thoma (1891–1948), German army officer
- Xaver Paul Thoma (born 1953), German composer

Other

- 5492 Thoma, main-belt asteroid

== See also ==
- Mar Thoma
