= WeWOOD =

- Founded: 2010; 16 years ago (as Fratelli Diversi); Italy
- Founders: Alessandro Rosano; Daniele Guidi; Emma Bogren
- Headquarters: Lamporecchio, Italy
- Products: Wooden watches
- Website: we-wood.com

WeWOOD is a watch brand that manufacturers wooden watches and wooden furniture. The headquarters of the company is located in Lamporecchio and a North American regional office is located in Los Angeles.

According to WeWOOD, the company plants a tree for every watch sold.

== History ==
WeWOOD was developed in 2009 in Italy and its trademark was registered by Alessandro Rosano, Daniele Guidi and Emma Bogren in 2010, under the company name Fratelli Diversi. Prior to starting the company, Guidi was an accessories distributor and Rosano was a shoe designer. After a year of operations, the company opened a regional office in the United States in Fall 2011.

Initially the company sold two designs, Date (analog) and Crono (digital). WeWOOD watches were launched in the United Kingdom in March 2011.

WeWOOD works with American Forests to plant trees in North America and Trees for the Future to plant trees in other countries. By the end of 2013, the company had planted 250,000 trees.

== Description ==
WeWOOD manufactures watches completely from wood with the exception of the glass, movement, battery, pins and clasp. The watches use Japanese Miyota movement pieces. WeWOOD also manufactures multi-wood watches. The wood used in watches is hypo-allergenic and is not treated with chemicals. Therefore, the watches are not waterproof. The company uses different woods to derive different colors for the watches and does not use dyes to alter the color of the wood. The company uses recycled wood for manufacturing watches.

The designs of WeWOOD watches are prepared in Italy and the watches are manufactured in Indonesia and China. The company has offices in Los Angeles and Lamporecchio.
