= Parnis Watches =

- Industry: Watches
- Founded: 2005
- Founder: Xiao Jian Hong
- Headquarters: Guangzhou, China
- Products: Mechanical watches, mechanical watch parts

Parnis Watches is a Chinese watch brand established in 2005, in Guangzhou. Parnis primarily markets in Europe and the United States. Founder Xiao Jian Hong owns the trademarks and manufacturing plants, and has been expanding the company since 2005.

== Partnership ==
The company sells its watches by partnering with resellers and distributors. Suntime Watch Company markets the Parnis brand through regional distributors while Pa Jie markets to large clients and customers wanting to outsource watch production. The manufacturing facilities remain in Tong De Wei, Guangzhou.

== Manufacturing ==
Parnis designs their watches, contracts for the parts, assembles the watches and plans quality control. The manufacturing facility in Tong De Wei assembles parts from various vendors. Fu Yuan Xin Watch Product Factory manufacturers the cases, and movements are furnished by Tianjin Sea-Gull, Miyota and Dixmont.
