= Reguladora =

Fábrica Nacional de Relógios, Reguladora, S. A.
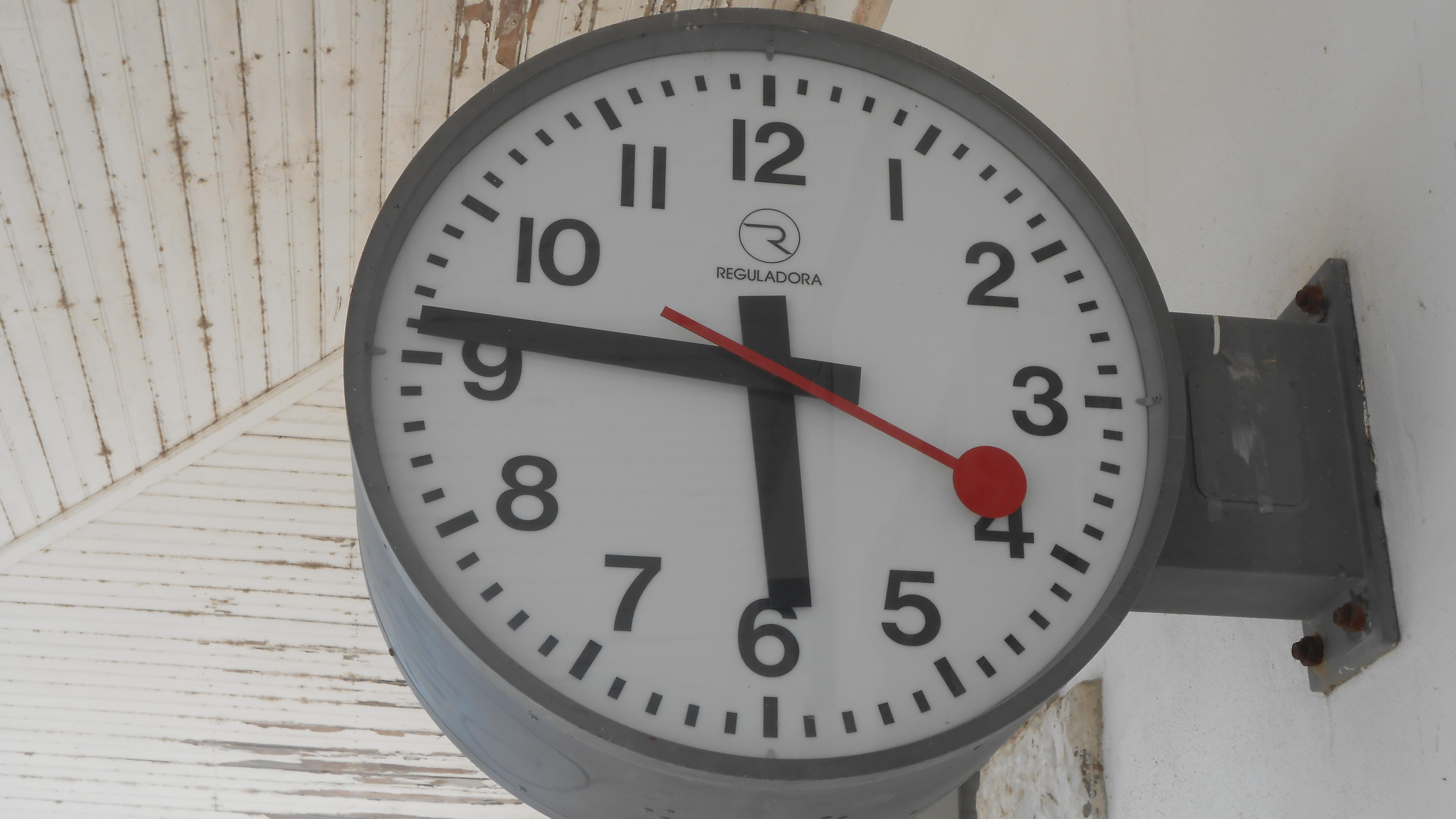
- Reguladora clock at Fontela railway station, 2013
- Company type: Sociedade Anónima
- Industry: Watches and clocks
- Founded: 1892
- Founder: José Gomes Carvalho
- Headquarters: Vila Nova de Famalicão, Portugal
- Area served: Portugal and South America
- Products: Wristwatches, pocket watches, table clocks and wall clocks
- Services: Manufacturing
- Website: reguladora.pt

Fábrica Nacional de Relógios, Reguladora, S. A. or simply Reguladora is a watch and clock manufacturing company, based in Vila Nova de Famalicão, Portugal. Founded in 1892, Reguladora is the oldest watch manufacturing company in the Iberian Peninsula.

Reguladora produces four ranges of watches: column clocks, table clocks, wall clocks and wristwatches (including pocket watches).

== History ==
The company under the name A Boa Reguladora was established on February 15, 1892, in Vila Nova de Famalicão, Portugal. It was founded by Porto-born watchmaker João José de São Paulo and José Gomes da Costa Carvalho from Mouquim to pioneer watch manufacturing in the country.

In May 1893, the company obtained a patent on the improvements on the standard mechanical movement and a 6-year privilege which helped it to gain momentum. The company's first workshop was opened in Porto in 1893. The following year, the company was awarded the gold medal at the agricultural and industrial exhibition of Vila Nova de Gaia.

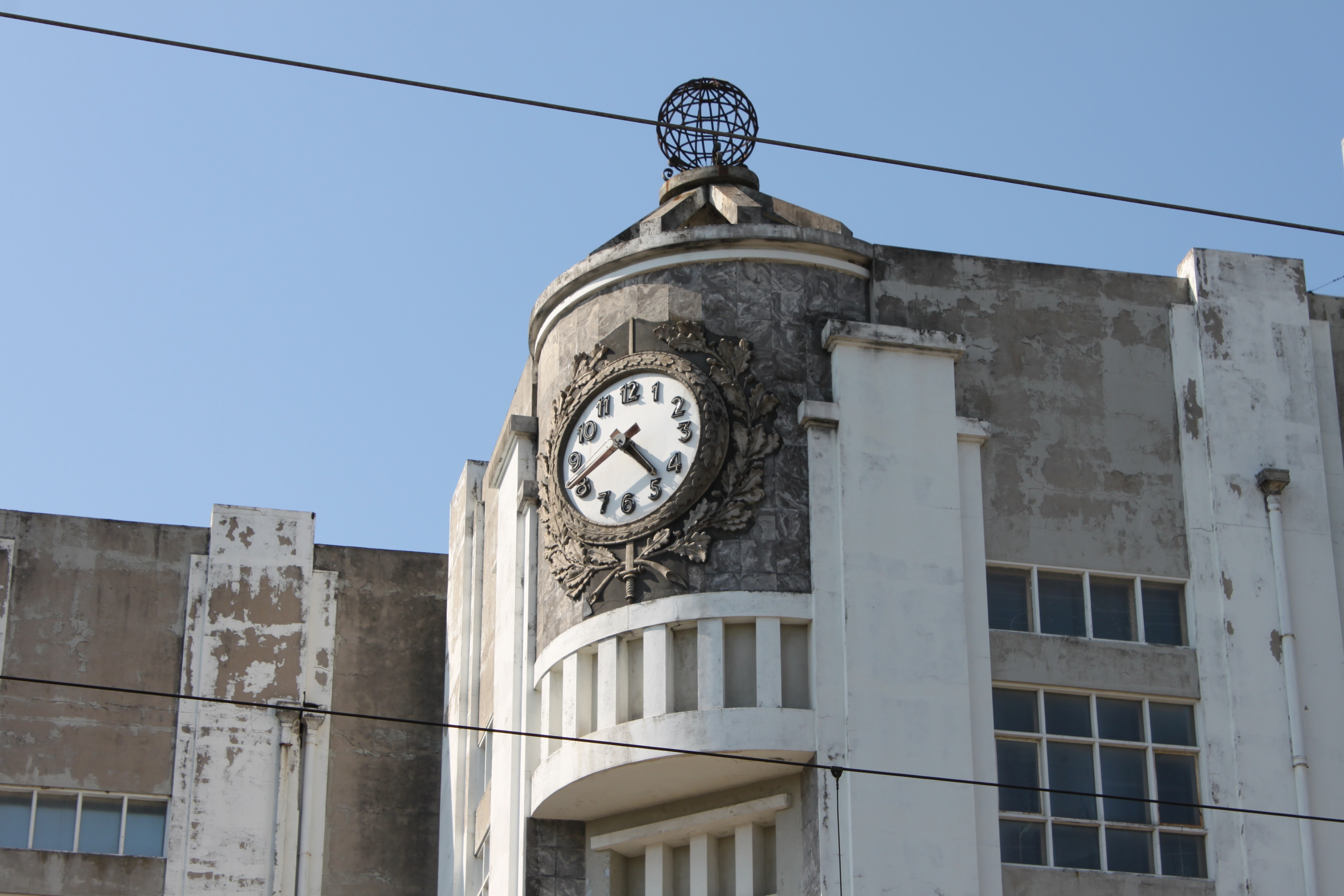
Former Reguladora factory next to Famalicão Railway Station.

Following João São Paulo death in July 11, 1895, José Carvalho invited his brother Lino de Carvalho, a watchmaker, as a partner. Soon, the brothers moved the production to Vila Nova de Famalicão, allowing them to reduce operational costs. By 1987, the factory had 36 workers and 34 machines of different types. In addition to watchmaking workshop, the brothers ran a mechanical carpentry and a sawmill.

Since 1903, the company provided the village with electricity for street lights. In 1907, the company built its own steam power plant and became the concessionaire for the supply of public and private lighting in Vila Nova de Famalicão. The factory expanded rapidly. By 1914, it employed 220 workers and produced 6,408 units of timepieces per year. In 1923, the company was awarded the gold medal at the Rio de Janeiro international exhibition.

The same year, Boa Reguladora built a new facility in Vila Nova de Famalicão, which became the most significant element of the town's industrial heritage. The company also built a working-class neighborhood, a chapel, and a social center. It was designed by the architect Francisco Caldeira Cabral and became a precursor to similar projects of 1950s and 1960s.

The railroad in the Vila Nova de Famalicão helped brothers to build a vast distribution network. The company produced watches and clocks, later expanding its range of products to other equipment, such as electricity and water meters. the company produces alarm clocks, wall clocks, column clocks, and more.

In 1992, Boa Reguladora became a part of the Schlumberger group of companies. In 2001, it was acquired by Actaris group. In 2007, three former employees revived the company under the name Regularfama and resumed watch production in the old factory. The factory closed in 2012.

== Products ==
Reguladora produces the following products:

1. Column clock models: Atenas, Camberra, Monaco and Santa Comba.
2. Table clock models: Batalha, Batalha Flores, Batalha Romano, Évora, Fátima, Floral, Funchal, Leiria, Mini Batalha Mecânico, Polo, Mini Batalha, Mini Sintra, Tomar, Viena Romano and Vigo.
3. Wall clock models: BR6, Bragança, Cascais, Cavalinho, Coimbra, COP326, COP327, COP328, COP329, COP330, Corunha, CP26, Douro Carrilhão, Estoril, Gótico, Madrid Árabe, Madrid Romano, Mindelo, Óbidos, Oito, Olso Árabe, Oslo Romano, Paris, QR3355 and QR3356.
4. Wristwatch models: Turbilhão 8C2022, 4422CH, 8C2031, 4415, 8C2048, 8C2023A, 8C2040, 8C2041, 8C2021, 8C2140, 8C2043, 8C2039, 8C301B, 8C224, 8C186 Preto, 8C186 Branco, 8C242, 91916, 8C243, 90216 and T01482 (pocket watch).
