= Bausele =

Australian watch manufacturer

- Type: Privately held
- Industry: Retail
- Founded: 2011; 15 years ago
- Founders: Christophe Hoppe
- Headquarters: Sydney, Australia
- Products: Clocks and watches
- Website: www.bausele.com

Bausele is an Australian watch company founded in Sydney in 2011 by Swiss-born watchmaker Christophe Hoppé. The company designs watches in Australia using Swiss movements and components, and is known for its signature hollow watch crowns containing physical Australian elements such as sand, red earth, coral, opal and sea glass.

Bausele was the first Australian watch brand to exhibit at Baselworld in Switzerland in 2015. The company has since participated in Geneva Watch Days and international watch industry events in Switzerland.

== History ==
Bausele was founded in Sydney in 2011 by Christophe Hoppé, who previously worked in the Swiss watch industry in Geneva and La Chaux-de-Fonds before relocating to Australia.

The company name is derived from the phrase "Beyond Australian Elements".

In 2015, Bausele became the first Australian watch brand to exhibit at Baselworld in Switzerland.

In 2016, Bausele entered a joint venture with Flinders University's Centre for NanoScale Science and Technology to develop "Bauselite", a ceramic composite material used in the Terra Australis collection.

In 2023 and 2024, the company participated in Geneva Watch Days.

== Design philosophy ==
Bausele watches are designed in Australia and use Swiss movements and Swiss components.

The company is known for its hollow crown design, which contains small quantities of Australian materials associated with specific collections or locations. Materials used have included Bondi Beach sand, Australian red earth, sea glass, coral and military base soil.

== Collections ==
=== OceanMoon ===
The OceanMoon collection is a series of dive watches inspired by Australian coastal environments.

=== Terra Australis ===
The Terra Australis collection introduced the use of "Bauselite", a proprietary ceramic composite material developed in collaboration with Flinders University.

=== Pilot Automatic ===
The Pilot Automatic collection was developed in collaboration with Australian aviation and military communities.

=== Elemental Collection ===
In 2024, Bausele released the Elemental Collection, a series of dive watches developed with input from more than 400 contributors.

== Partnerships ==
In 2021, Bausele produced the official centenary watch for the Royal Australian Air Force.

The company has also collaborated with the Sydney Opera House, Australian military organisations, and the Bathurst 12 Hour endurance race.

== Recognition ==
Bausele has been included in lists of Australian watch brands published by media outlets including Time+Tide Watches, Man of Many, DMARGE, WatchGecko and Teddy Baldassarre.
