= Regina pocket watches =

Brand of pocket watch

Size 18 and size 12 Regina Pocket Watches

Regina pocket watches were a brand of pocket watches made by Omega that were popular in the early 1900s. The name Regina Pocket Watch was originally trademarked by LOUIS MAIER in Bienne Switzerland in 1888. The name was then trademarked by Omega in 1911, indicating that they bought the company at that time. The faces and mechanisms were imported into New York and assembled with cases in Ontario, for sale mostly in Canada.

Individually stamped production runs were made for a small fee. The result is that many Regina watches have the name and town of a vendor on their face. Regina watches are occasionally stamped with the name of an American city, indicating that some were sold in the United States.

The National Association of Watch and Clock Collectors describes Regina watches as an inferior brand of Omega, but mentions that some were adjusted highly enough to be used as railroad timepieces, which was the standard for quality watches.

The term 'farmer watch' is sometimes applied to them.

Some early watches, made before the Omega takeover have a date stamped on the mechanism. The company changed hands in the 1970s and the new owners destroyed many of the old records, making it difficult to precisely date most Regina watches.

== Sizes ==
The systems used for sizing pocket watches have changed over time. In North America, pocket watches are usually sized by the Lancashire gauge which is based on the Size 0s being 1 inch across and increasing sizes being measured in 1/30th of an inch. The measurement is according to the width of the plate under the face, not the exterior of the case. For any important purpose the size should be determined correctly.

Quality watches were checked in different positions (dial facing up, down, sideways, etc.) More adjustments generally meant better quality.
