= Leijona =

Finnish watch brand

Leijona Watches
- Industry: Watchmaking
- Founded: 1907, Tampere, Finland
- Founder: J. W. Lindroos
- Headquarters: Finland
- Parent: Oy Perkko
- Website: leijonawatches.com

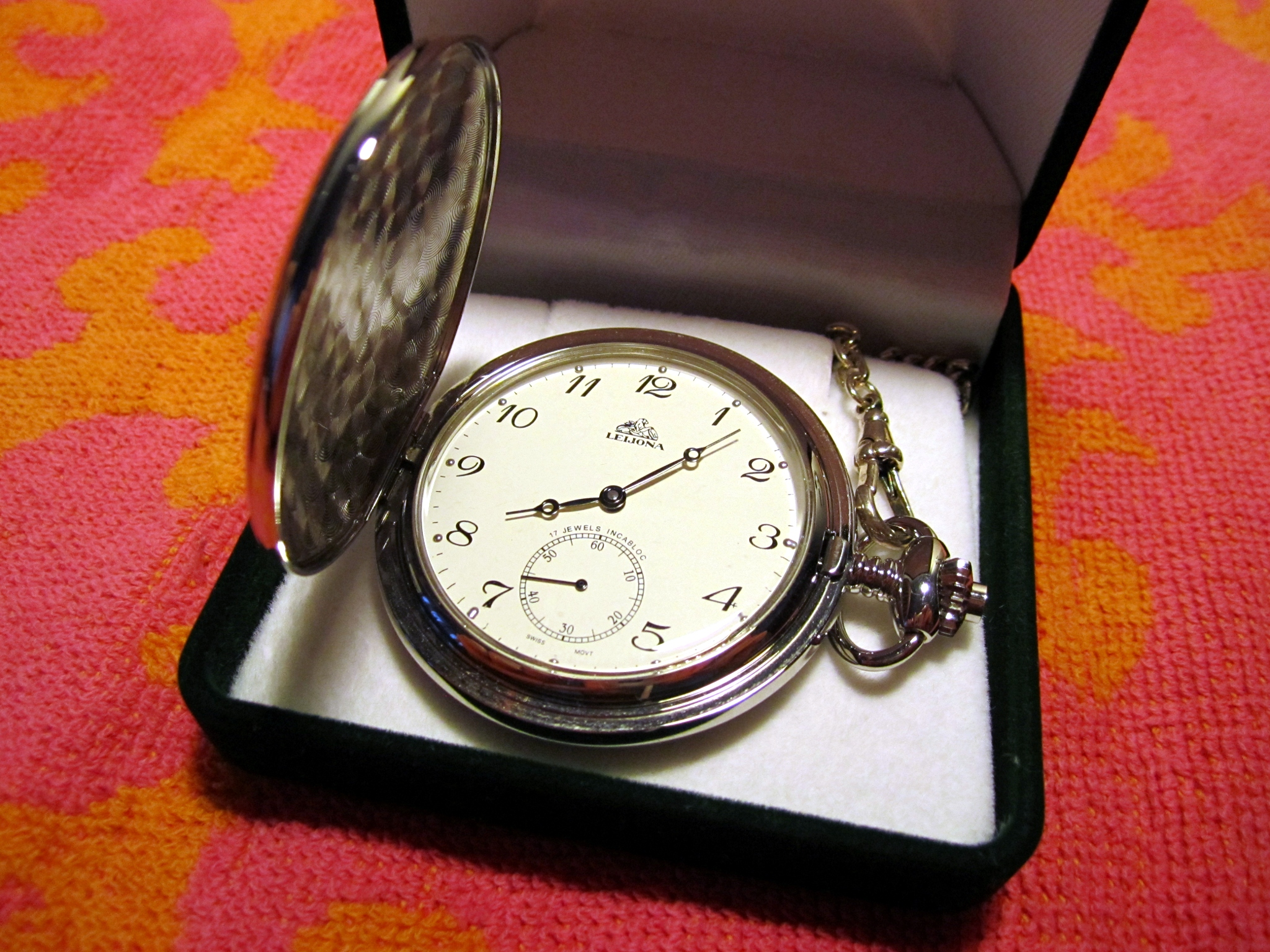
Leijona Pocket Watch from 2002

Leijona is a Finnish watch brand owned by the company Oy Perkko. History of the brand dates back to 1907 when Johan Werner Lindroos started importing watches into Finland. The brand has been owned by the Perkko family since 1919. The watches were originally manufactured in Switzerland, and later mostly in Japan and China. In recent years, the brand has reintroduced Swiss made watches as a part of its collections, most notably the high-end Leijona Heritage 1907 collection developed together with watchmaker Kari Voutilainen.

== History ==
The origins of the Leijona watches lie in the famous watchmaking valley of Val-de-Travers. Swiss trademark archives show that the unique lion with shield logo was first registered by watchmaker Albert Kenel & Co in December 1880 and continued by Manufacture d’Horlogerie Lion SA from 1892.

Watchmaker Johan Werner Lindroos (1870-1937) started importing the watches to Finland in the early 1900s. In 1909 and 1910, there were registry marks with the Finnish name Leijona and a stylized capital L on the shield of the lion by Camille Barré / Montres Lion and Leijona Watch Co.

Perkko Ab bought J. W. Lindroos' business in 1919; the duty of importing and retail selling of the Leijona watches (on the behalf of the brand) was moved to them.

== Description ==
Today, Leijona is the most popular watch brand in Finland, and the brand has a catalog of 350 different watches. New models are introduced several times a year. They combine influences from international trends as well as local Finnish styles. The watches provided by Leijona contain, but are not limited to wristwatches, pocket watches and necklace watches. The collection has trendy as well as conservative models.
