= Phenix Watch Company =

Dissolved Swiss watch company

Phenix
- Industry: Watch makers
- Founded: 1873; 153 years ago in Porrentruy, Switzerland
- Fate: Dissolved

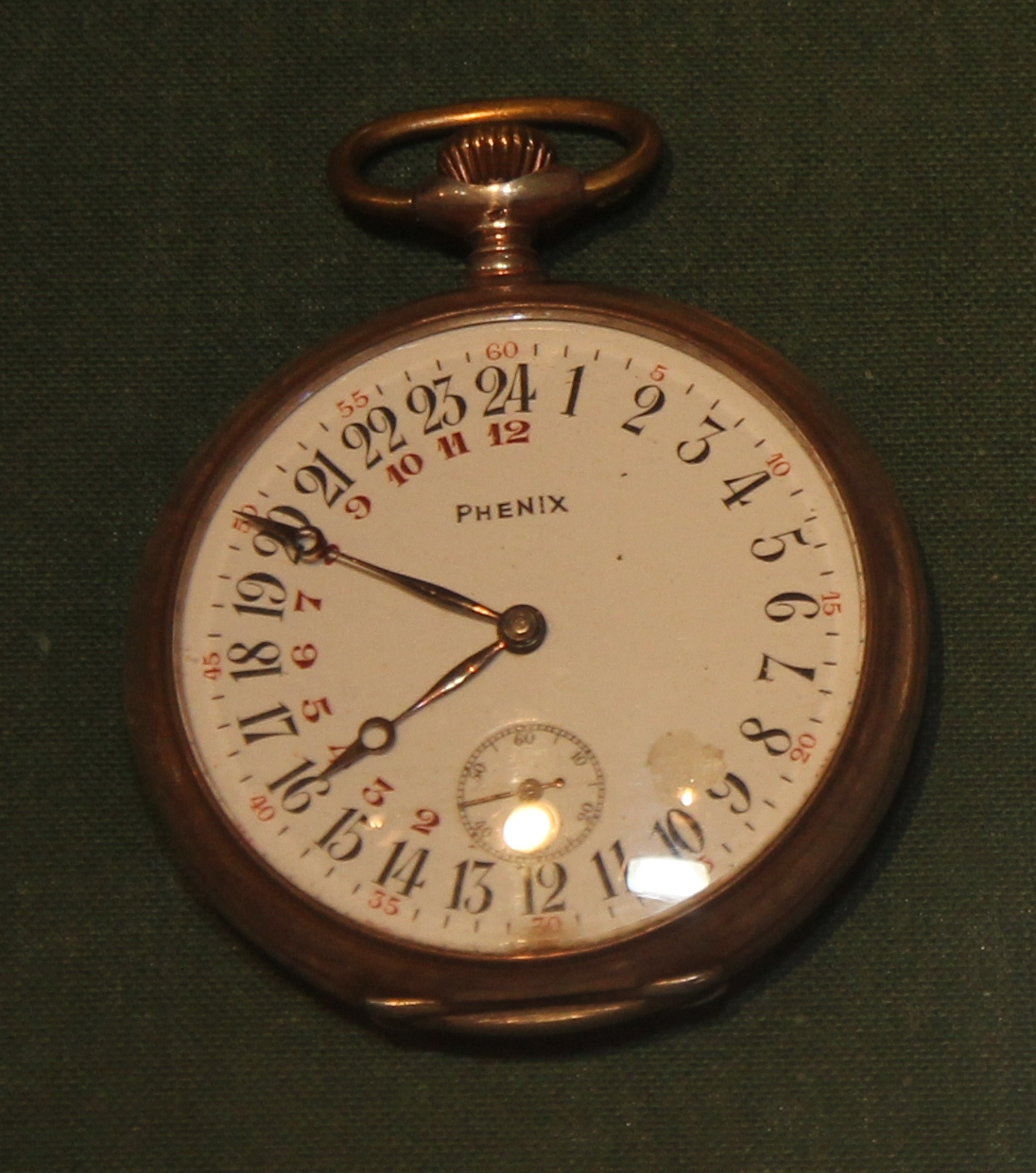
Phenix 24-hour watch

The Phenix Watch Company was created in 1873 in Porrentruy, Switzerland as Dubail, Monnin, Frossard & Cie. It became Société d'horlogerie de Porrentruy in 1900 before renaming to Phenix Watch Co. in the 1920s.

The Phenix watch was entirely manufactured and assembled on site. This enabled the watchmaker to ensure uniformly high quality and craftsmanship for each watch. In part as a result of this attention to detail, the brand won a number of industry awards, particularly for its Firebird model.

In the 1960s, Phenix became divided into three brands, with the other two brands named Thomen and Vulcain. The latter was relaunched in 2004.
