= Obrey =

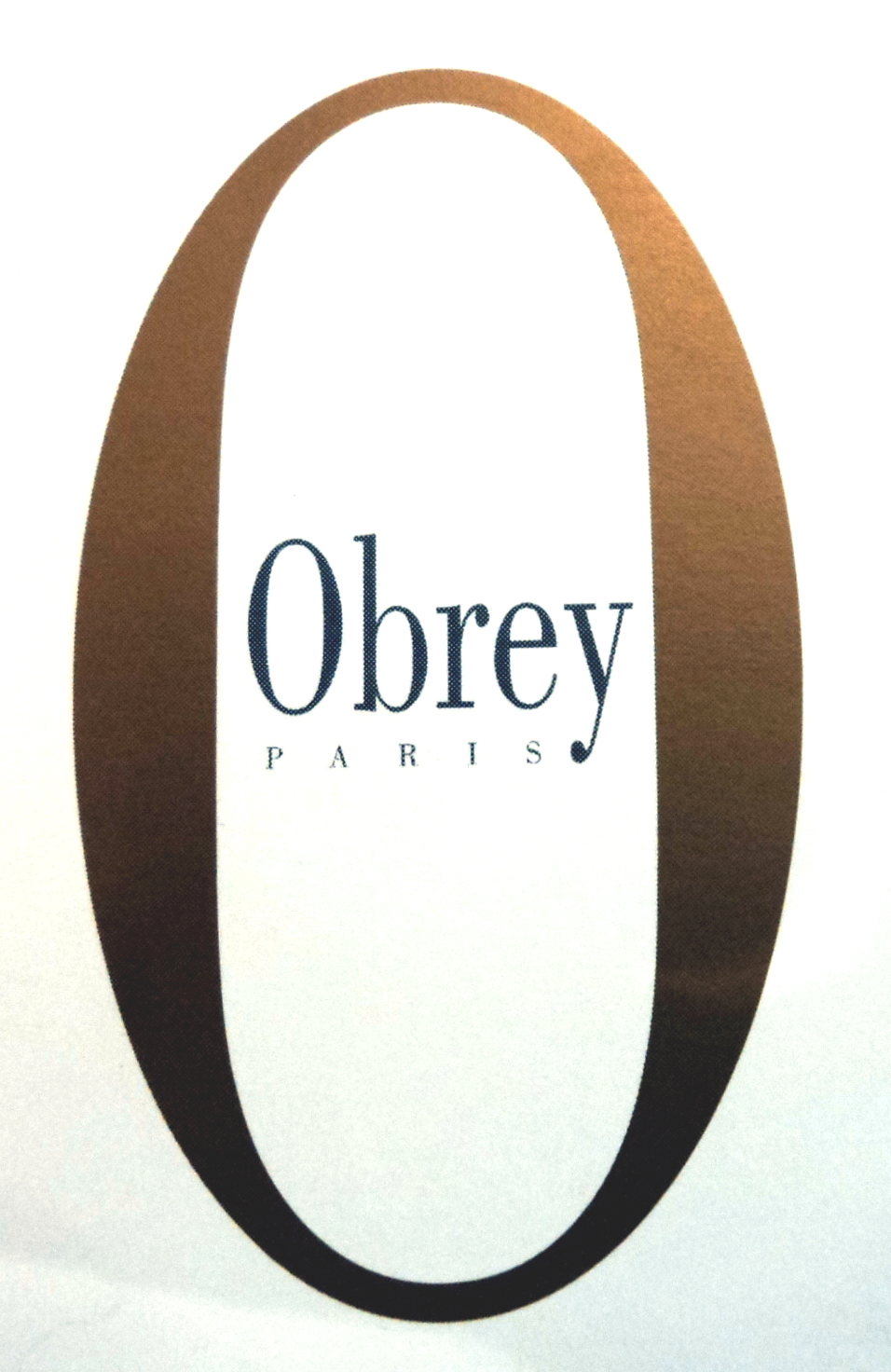
- Company type: Private
- Industry: Jewellery manufacturing; Watchmaking
- Founded: Paris, France (1951)
- Founder: Émile Obrey
- Headquarters: Paris, France
- Area served: Worldwide
- Website: obrey-paris.com

Obrey watches is a luxury watch manufacturer that distributes and sales jewellery and watches in Paris since 1951.

== History ==
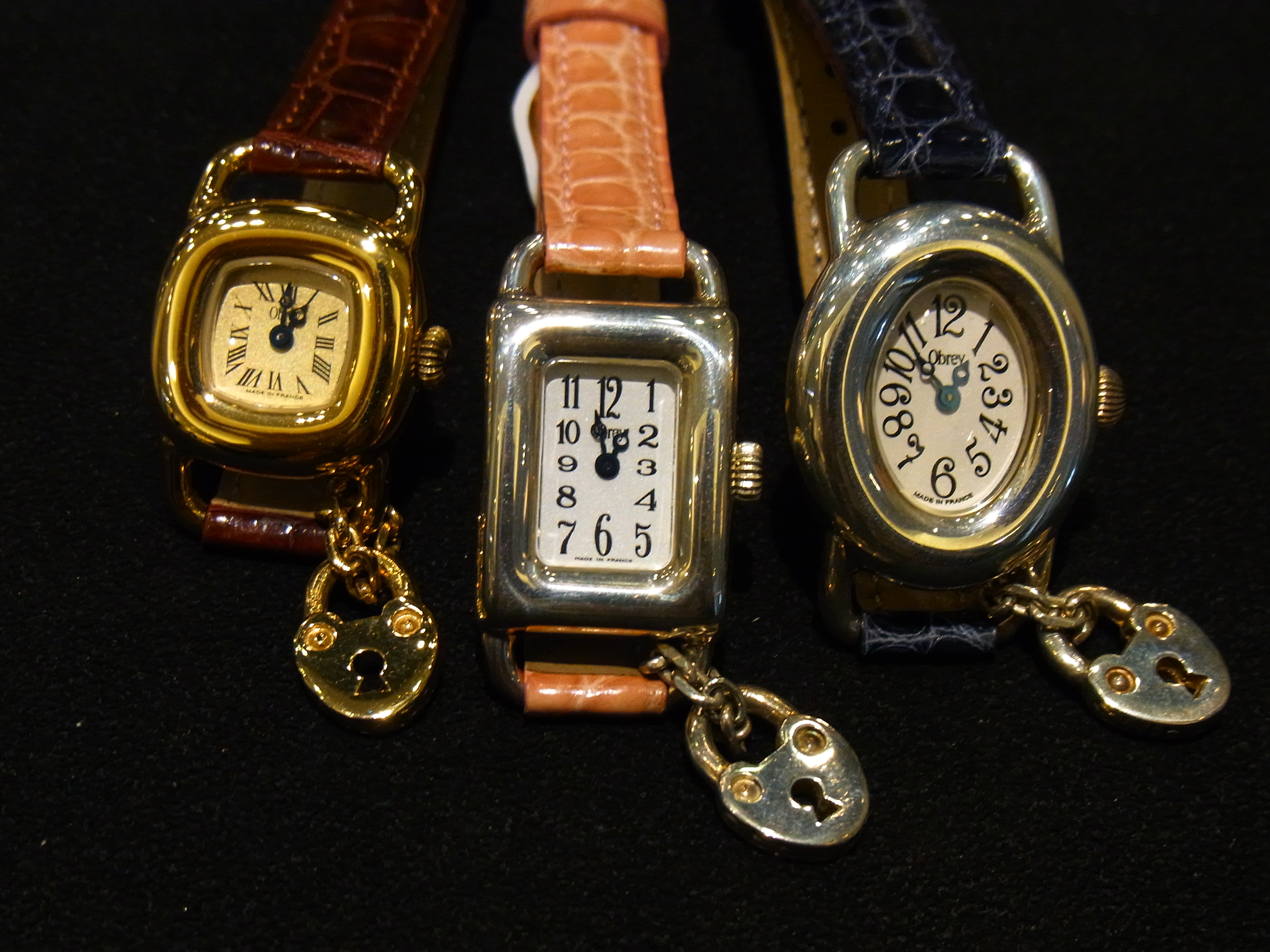
Obrey watches in solid silver

Émile Obrey opened his first shop in the 1930s. After being part of the French resistance during World War II, the company founded its branch on rue Tronchet, Paris, in 1951. The Obrey company launched a collection of solid silver watches in 1966. The company became popular during the 1960s-1970s. During this period, the company grew significantly, becoming an international firm, and selling its products worldwide, especially in the US and Germany. The house Obrey has always been administered by the Obrey family. Today, Émile Obrey's son is the current manager of the company. The house Obrey uses quartz mechanisms (Swiss mechanisms, mainly ETA).
