= Melbourne Watch Company =

Australian watch manufacturer

- Type: Privately held
- Industry: Retail
- Founded: 2013; 13 years ago
- Founders: Sujain Krishnan
- Headquarters: Melbourne, Australia
- Key people: Sujain Krishnan
- Products: Clocks and watches
- Owner: Matt Corbo
- Website: Official website

Melbourne Watch Company is an Australian manufacturer of watches. It was founded in Melbourne in 2013 by Sujain Krishnan.
