= Bozeman Watch Company =

- Company type: Privately held company
- Industry: Original luxury timepiece engineer and manufacturer
- Founder: Christopher F. Wardle
- Defunct: May 9, 2015
- Headquarters: Bozeman, Montana, United States
- Products: Wristwatches, leather goods

Bozeman Watch Company was a watch manufacturer based in Bozeman, Montana. The company received certification for its mechanical components from the Contrôle officiel suisse des Chronomètres (COSC), an organization recognized for its precision standards. Bozeman Watch Company went out of business on May 9, 2015.

== History ==
Christopher F. Wardle, originally a native of Birmingham, Michigan, sought out an industrial designer to help put his vision and original watch designs to paper. Having been a collector of many American brands and having the desire to keep his models reminiscent of mid-20th century styles, Wardle started to convert concepts into designs and in 2005 introduced his first timepiece, the Smokejumper Chronograph.

== Operations ==
The company opened its first showroom in Bozeman, Montana, in 2005. In 2008, it expanded its design team in Michigan and increased its capacity to develop proprietary engineering data and tooling for custom watch components, supporting plans for additional showrooms. In 2010, the Bozeman Watch Company opened a dealership in Whitefish, Montana [1], followed by another in Jackson Hole, Wyoming, in 2011.

According to the company, designing and bringing a watch model to market could take up to three years. Unlike many watchmakers who source parts from catalogs, Bozeman Watch Company reports that it commissions custom-made components for exclusive use in its products.

== Watch Models ==
=== Yellowstone ===
The ladies' Yellowstone watch has a 32 mm (1.3 in) case diameter, interlaced with sapphire crystals. It is waterproof up to 5 ATM or about 165 ft (50 m). It has a 21-jewel automatic mechanical movement with a date function and a secondhand sweep. A hundred pieces were expected to be produced in 2011 and estimated to be available for purchase in December 2011. A men's 38 mm (1.5 in) model was scheduled to be released simultaneously with the ladies' model. The men's model was planned to house a 25-jewel automatic movement. It was available in stainless steel or alligator black wristband.

=== B1 Hellcat ===
This watch offered two straps: a tan or black saddle leather strap and a stainless steel bracelet. It was planned to be released in the first edition of 200. It has a 42.6 mm (1.68 in) diameter watch face and a 13.2 mm (0.52 in) height. It also has a 25-jewel Swiss movement, 28,800 vibrations per hour (VPH), a sweep second hand and date functions, and a screw-down crown. It is water resistant to 330 ft (100 m).

=== SnowMaster Telemetric ===
The SnowMaster Telemetric has a 43 mm (1.7 in) stainless steel case with a 25-jewel automatic Swiss Valjoux movement. Each movement is independently COSC certified in Geneva with second, minute and hour Chronograph timing functions. It also comes with a second 24-hour time zone complication or GMT function as well as a speed and distance telemetric scale.

=== Smokejumper GMT and Smokejumper Chronograph ===
There are two Smokejumper style watches, the Smokejumper GMT and Chronograph. The GMT World time is the National Smokejumpers official timepiece. It comes with two dial colors: silver and black or enamel and super luminescent. The GMT has automatic Swiss specialty-line mechanical movement, a 21-jewel movement with 28,800 VPH. It has a 42-hour power reserve and a second-time zone function. It is COSC certified, is water resistant to 330 ft (100 m) and is domed with sapphire crystals. The back is engraved with the endorsement of the Missoula, MT smokejumper base logo. The GMT will initially be limited to one hundred individual numbered pieces. The original Smokejumper Chronograph, as stated in the April 2008 issue of Insync, "[I]s BWC's only chronograph and at 46.5 mm, its most significant. It is also limited to 100 individually numbered watches.

=== Herradura ===
The Herradura was developed with the direction of two-time World Series winner, Boston Red Sox pitcher Josh Beckett. Beckett's signature was sent to the BWC so that each of the 53 numbered pieces had the pitcher's mark on it. The Herradura has 24 jewels with 28,800 VPH, a sweep second hand with a three o'clock date window. It is COSC-certified with raised Arabic numerals and raised gold markers with luminescence. It is water resistant to 330 ft (100 m) and comes with a 44 mm (1.7 in) stainless steel case. The leather strap, which is available in saddle tan, is handmade.

=== Sidewinder ===
The Sidewinder Retrograde was introduced as a part of its "Montana Class Watch Collection". It is made in the style of a 19th-century timepiece, with raised and separate dial accents. The watch is limited to 100 silver and 50 black dial references, with each piece individually numbered. They each have a power reserve meter sub-dial, a sweep second hand, and a three o'clock date marker and are all COSC certified. They are water resistant to 330 ft (100 m), have a convex sapphire crystal dome, and come with a 44 mm (1.7 in) stainless steel case.

=== USS Montana ===
The USS Montana has modified Val Granges automatic caliber, with 24 jewels and 28,800 VPH. It is COSC certified with sweep second hand and raised blue Roman numerals. It is water resistant up to 330 ft (100 m) and has a 44 mm (1.7 in) stainless steel case. The USS Montana has a convex sapphire crystal and tiered lugs. The watch the U.S.S. Montana drew plenty of attention in 2006 after CEO, Christopher Wardle attended the 65th Pearl Harbor Survivors convention in Honolulu as a guest speaker. Later in 2012 Mr. Wardle was asked by then Senator John Tester to initiate contact with Admiral Raymond Edmond Maybus, the Navy's top Officer at the Pentagon to discuss Montana's unique history and absence of a naval vessel bearing the state's name. After Christopher Wardle coordinated with the Pentagon, it was then that Senator Tester was able to get a bill for the Virginia class submarine, The U.S.S. Montana through Congress and defense appropriations.

=== 2nd Edition Cutthroats ===
The 2nd edition Cutthroat watch has been made with the addition of a 24-hour time zone or GMT function. There are five versions of the Cutthroat. It has a Swiss automatic caliber (movement), 21 jewels with 28,800 VPH, a sweep second hand and date function, a 24-hour second-time zone on the outer dial, COSC certified, individually placed, raised luminescent hour markers, water resistance to 10 ATM below sea level, a 42 mm (1.7 in) stainless steel case and only 10.5 mm (0.41 in) in height, and a convex (domed) sapphire crystal.

=== Schofield ===
Limited to a 2010 production of 10 Silver dial individually numbered pieces and 24 jewels with 28,800 VPH, the Schofield timepiece is a 44 mm (1.7 in) stainless steel case with sweep second hand and a 3 o'clock date window. It has individually placed stainless Roman Numerals and raised luminescent 3, 6, 9, and 12-hour markers. It comes in a silver or black dial. It comes in a Caiman handmade crocodile strap, available in brown or black, a handmade Louisiana alligator strap in brown or black, or a handmade Montana saddle leather strap in tan or black. All of them have deployment buckles.
