= Louis Erard =

Swiss watch manufacturer

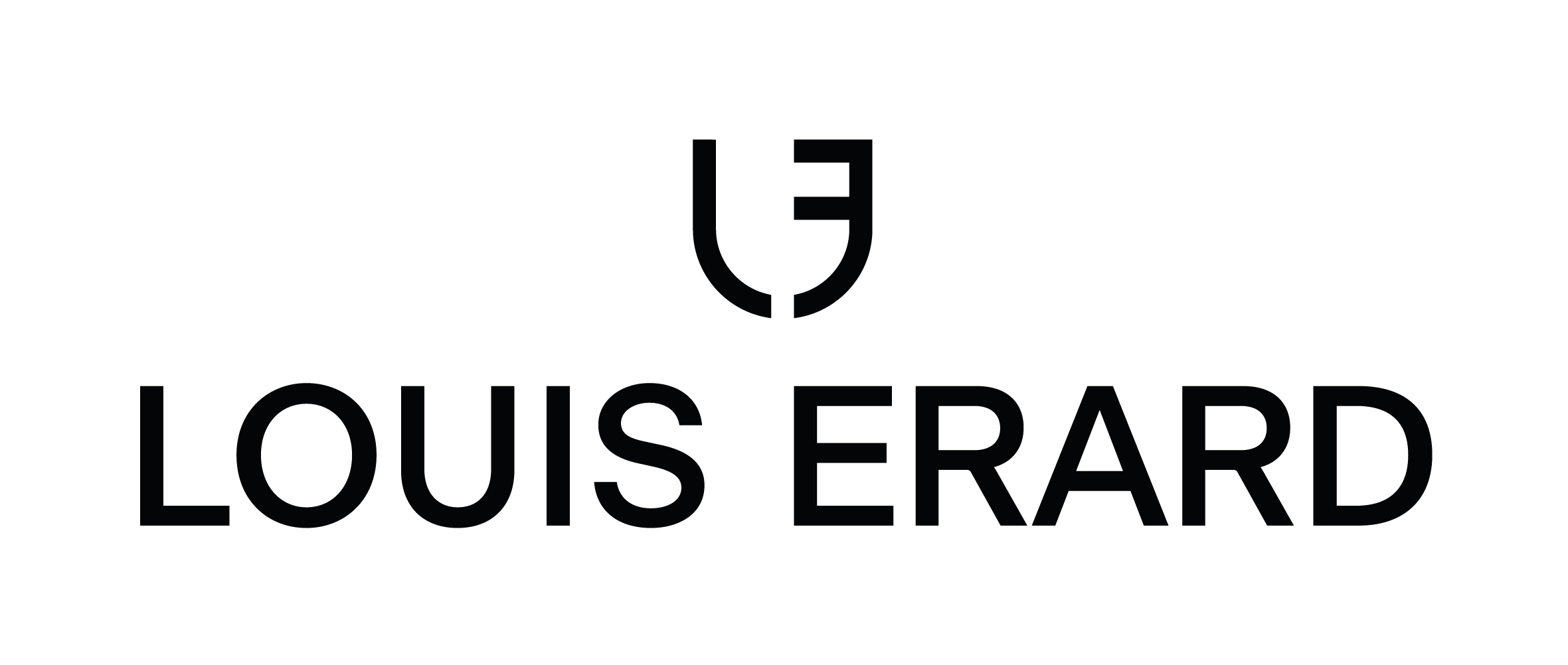
- Type: Private
- Industry: Luxury Watches
- Founded: 1929
- Founder: Louis Erard and André Perret
- Headquarters: Rue de l'Ouest 2, 2340 Le Noirmont, Le Noirmont (JU), Switzerland
- Key people: Manuel Emch
- Products: Wristwatches, Accessories
- Revenue: unknown
- Number of employees: 10
- Website: louiserard.com

Louis Erard is an independent Swiss watch manufacturer that was founded in 1929. The company was founded by Louis Erard and André Perret and produced its first watches in 1931.

== History ==
Louis Erard was born on 16 February 1893 in La Chaux-de-Fonds, Switzerland, into a family of watchmakers. Notable contemporaries from the same region include Louis-Joseph Chevrolet (founder of the eponymous automobile brand), the architect Le Corbusier (born Charles-Édouard Jeanneret), and the writer Blaise Cendrars.

Around 1900, La Chaux-de-Fonds and the neighbouring town of Le Locle together formed one of the most significant centres of watch production in the world. After training in various workshops in the region, Louis Erard founded a watchmaking school in 1929, followed by a company specialising in watch casing. At the time, watch components were typically produced by independent craftsmen and sold to so-called "assemblers", who built and adjusted the finished timepieces.

Company Development (1931–1969)

In 1931, Louis Erard began producing and selling watches under his own name alongside the company's contract work for third parties. Within six years, the workforce had grown to over 60 employees. During this period, the company contributed to the development of the Valjoux 72 chronograph movement, introduced in 1938 and subsequently used by brands.

In 1969, Louis Erard's grandson Paul, a business school graduate, joined the company and modernised its operations. The 1970s brought the so-called "quartz crisis", which disrupted the development of numerous Swiss watch brands. From 1978 onwards, the company continued to develop the Louis Erard brand.

During the 1980s, the company added a power-reserve indicator and a regulator function to the established Peseux 7001 movement, which had been introduced in 1971.

Change of Ownership and Relaunch (1992-2003)

In 1992, the Louis Erard brand changed ownership for family reasons and relocated to Le Noirmont in the Franches-Montagnes district.

In 1945, Louis Erard's sons René and Jean-Louis joined the company. The business continued to focus primarily on casing work for other watch brands. In 1956, Louis Erard was granted authorisation to manufacture watch movements — a status that permitted the purchase of movement blanks and enabled the company to develop movements, some of which were produced under its own name.

In 2003, the company was acquired by a group of investors led by Alain Spinedi, who had more than 30 years of experience in the watchmaking industry. Spinedi repositioned the brand in the mid-range segment of the Swiss watch market. The introduction of a comparatively accessible price point for a mechanical Swiss Made watch was noted by trade media and consumers alike.

Louis Erard today

Using mechanical movements from Sellita and Valjoux, Louis Erard has shipped over 200,000 watches from Le Noirmont, including collaborations with Leeds United Football Club and Ultima Sports sports cars.

Louis Erard continues to make watches with a regulator layout. In this layout, the hour, minute and second hand all pivot around different points. This layout was designed in mid-18th century for master clocks to offer the most accurate time readings available. Under the new leadership of Manuel Emch, in 2020 the brand contracted high-end watchmaker Vianney Halter who then designed "Le Regulateur" complication piece, which features amongst Louis Erard 'Excellence' watch collection.

Louis Erard collaborates with Alain Silberstein, Vianney Halter, and Konstantin Chaykin

In March 2026, Louis Erard celebrated its collaboration with Alain Silberstein with the launch of its Hall of Fame collection, limited production and popular styles and color-ways

== Awards ==
- 2020: GPHG Challenge (nominated) Le Régulateur Louis Erard x Alain Silberstein
