= O bag =

Italian fashion brand

O Bag
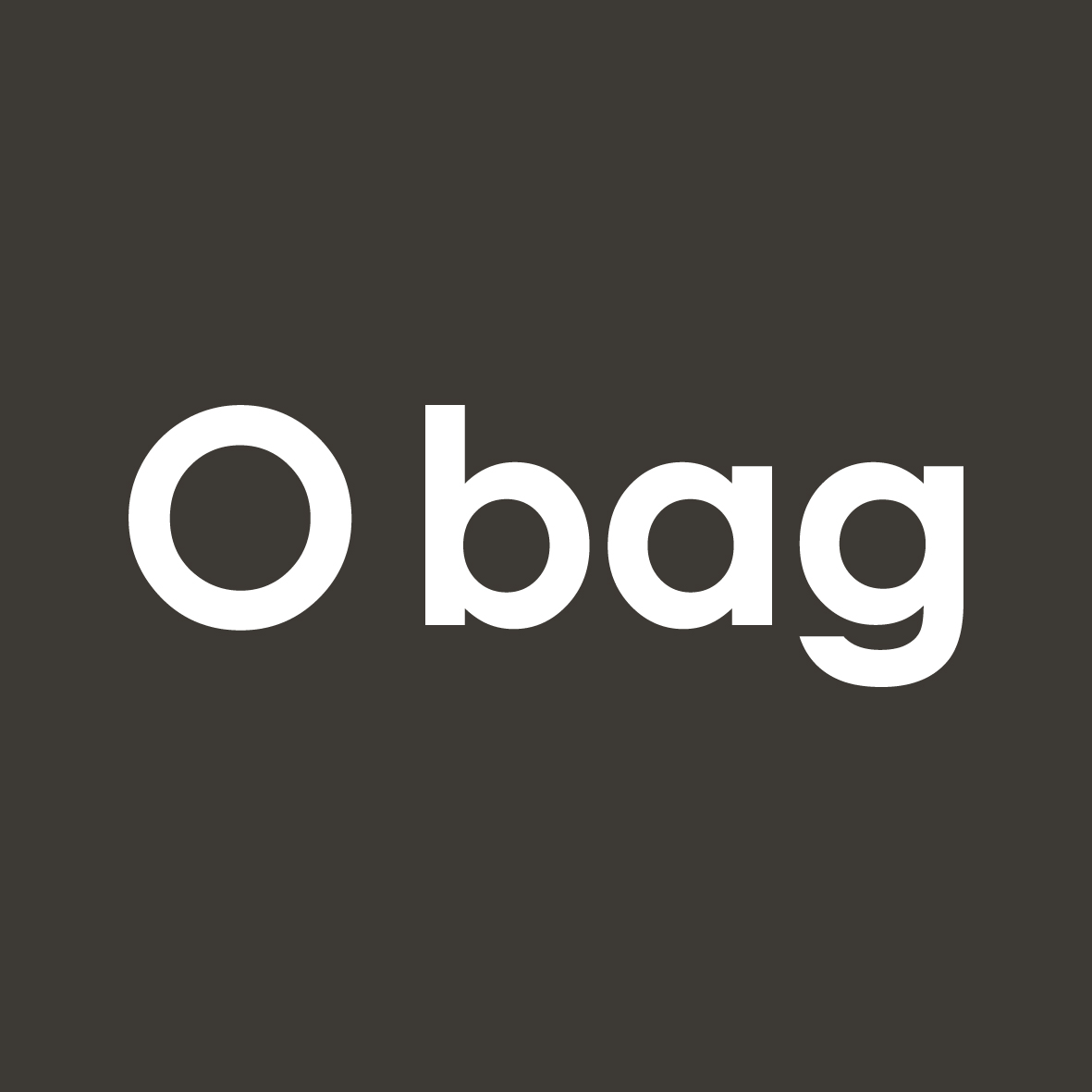
- Product type: Watches / Clothing Accessories
- Country: Italy (Padua)
- Introduced: 2009 (as Fullspot)
- Website: www.obag.eu

O Bag is an Italian fashion brand established in 2009 under the name Full spot. Initially, its main focus was producing watches but now produce bags and a range of fashion accessories.

== Origin ==
O Bag was founded in 2009 in Padua, Italy, by Michele Zanella, and its products were first exhibited at the Milan International Exhibition in 2010. After releasing the O clock, O Bag released a pocket watch, the O chive and a range of bags, the O bag. O Bag opened its first branded store in 2011 in Venice.

=== Source of the 'O' ===
Every product made by O Bag to date has had an 'O' in front of the product. This comes from the first of O Bag's products which was named the 'O Clock', much like the usual way of expressing the time in English. The company kept the 'O' as a way of identifying its products.

== Products ==
O Bag developed the O clock in 2010, a watch with a silicone strap and interchangeable faces. The original face of the watch, now called 'O clock Classic', consisted of a plain white face without numbers. The face can be removed from the strap allowing the color of the strap or face to be changed. There were originally 15 straps but this has grown to 29 which are still in production. O Bag's watch packaging takes inspiration from the tin can, a cylindrical tin with a ring pull. O clock developed into a series with the Tone-on-Tone range consisting of 21 watch face colors to mix and match with 21 straps making a total of 441 possible combinations with Tone on Tone. Other O clock ranges include Camouflage, 80’ clock, Disney, Gold & Silver, Mirror, Numbers, Flower Power and Safari.

In 2011 O Bag released a pocket watch, calling it the O chive. This maintains the minimalist design of the O clock range with a plain white face and the inclusion of a second's hand. The O chive is made of a soft-touch plastic shell and a white matt-varnished metal chain and clip. There were originally 10 colors but the three 80' clock colors were added, bringing the total to 13. The plastic shell can be removed and replaced with another color much like the O clock faces. The packaging is based on a shoe polish container.

In 2012 O Bag released the O bag (the product from which the company is now named), which is fully customizable, much like O Bag's previous products. The O bag is made from an elastomeric foam which comes in 20 different colors, most of which derive from the O clock color range. The bag's handles and interior can be customized with a variety of materials and colors.

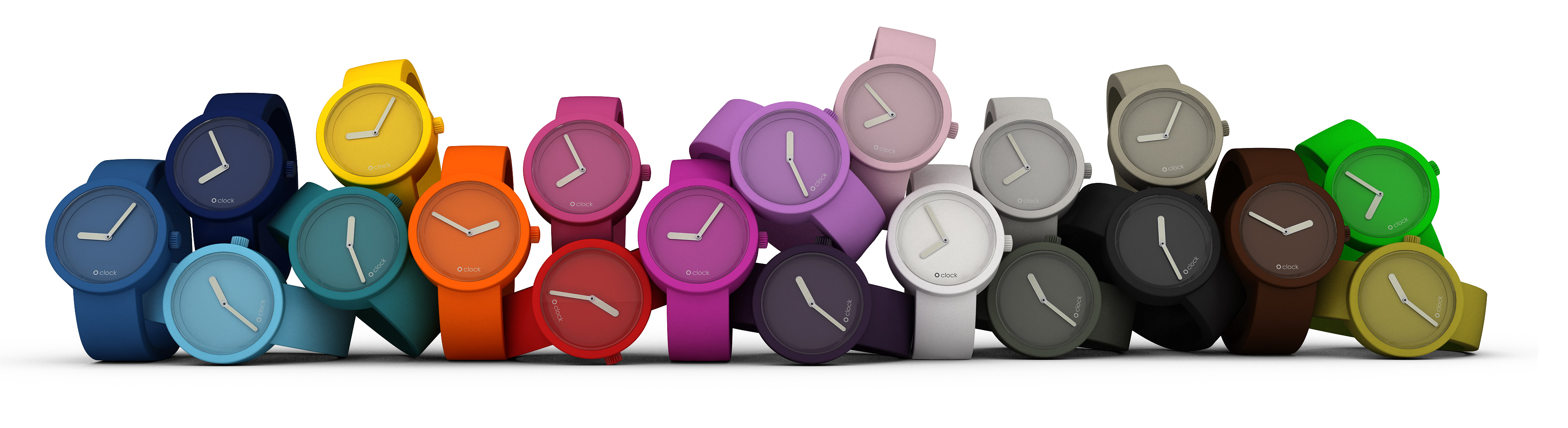
O clock Tone on Tone range

== Special Editions ==
O bag collaborated with Disney, developing a range of watch faces with some of Disney's most famous characters.

== Gallery ==
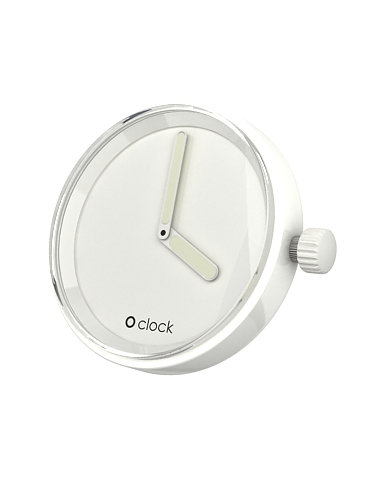
O clock Classic Face

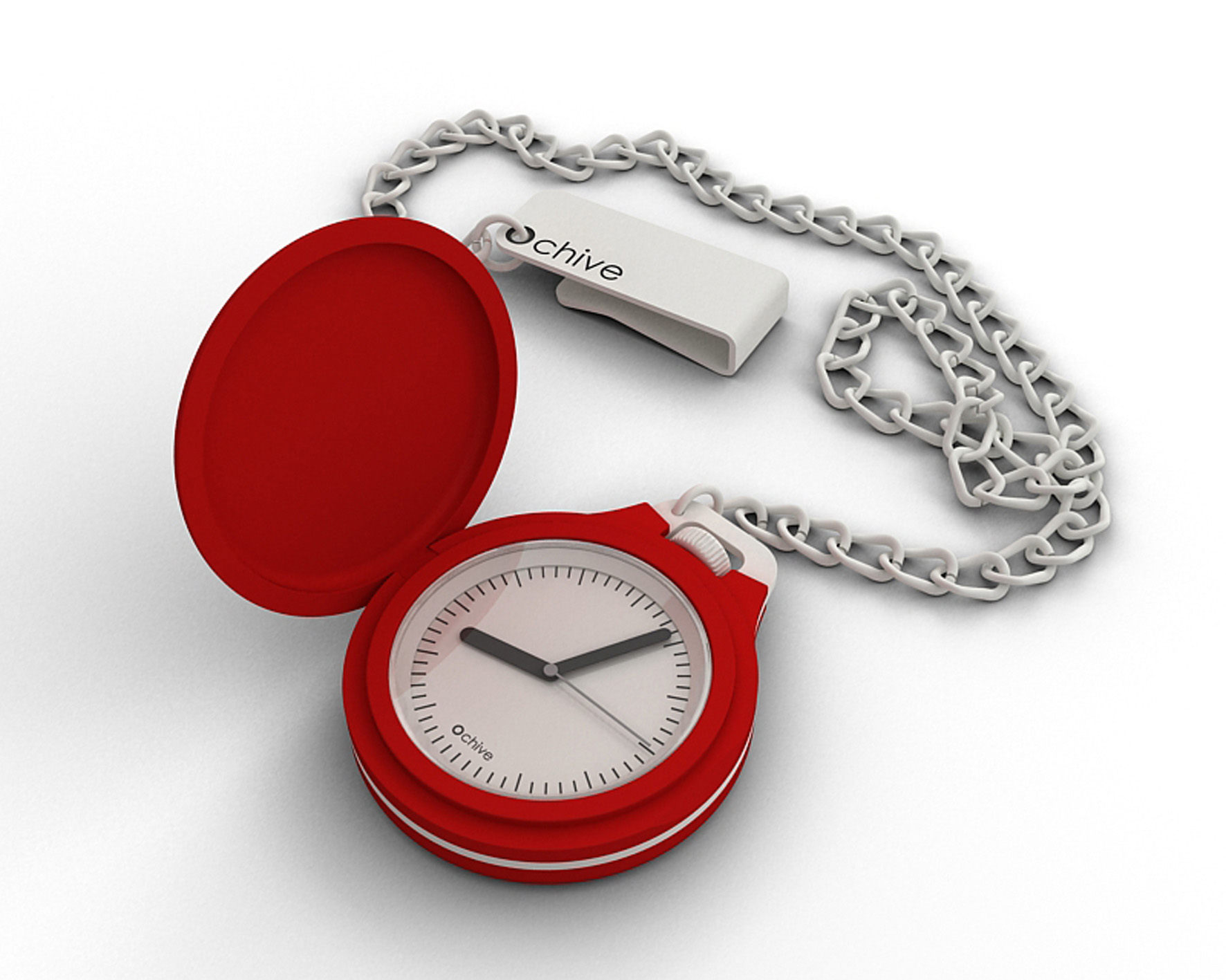
O chive

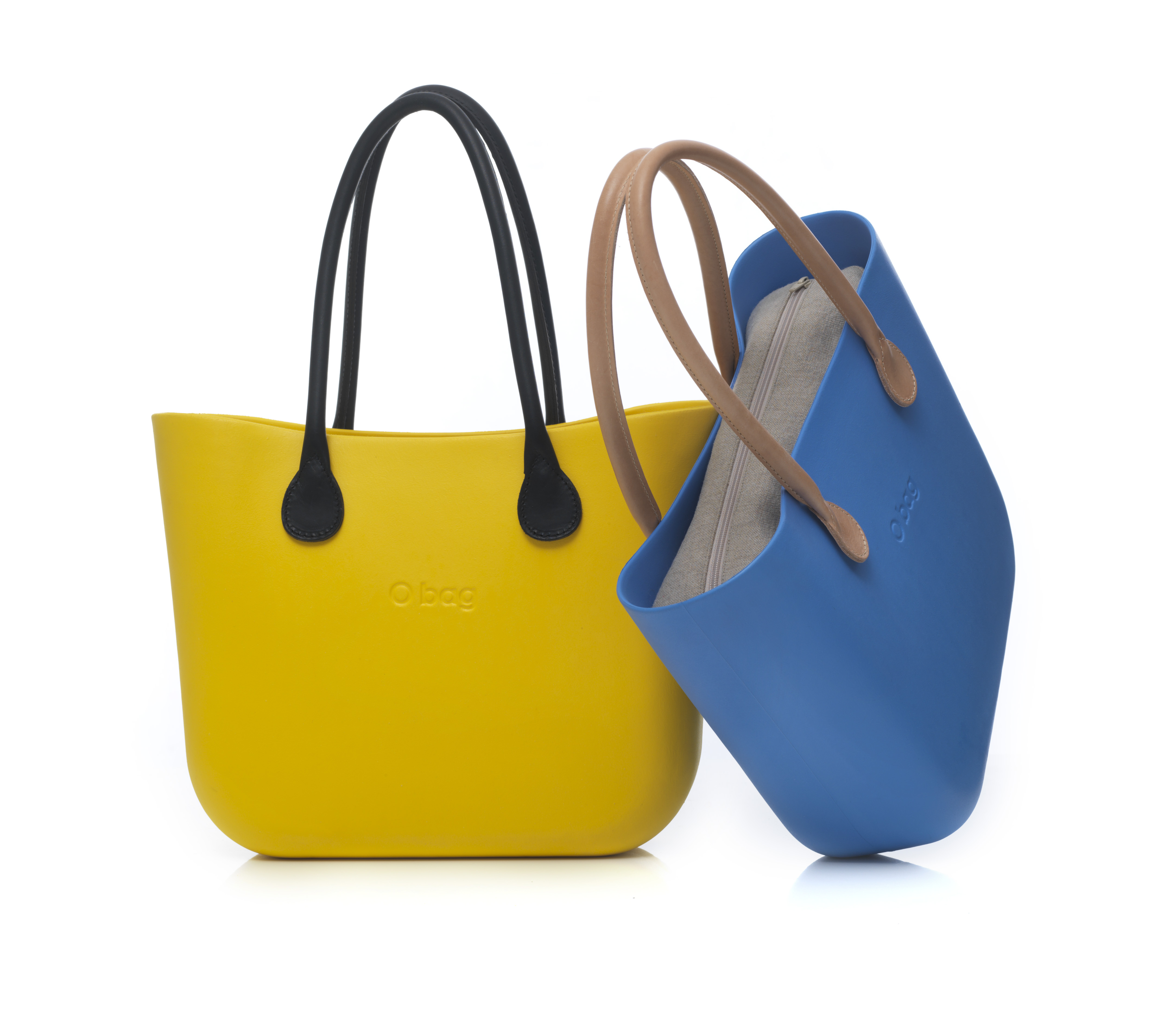
O bag Classic
