= Police (brand) =

Italian manufacturer of fashion accessories

Police logo

Police is an Italian brand of fashion accessories. Launched in 1983 by the De Rigo brothers as the first brand of their company Charme Lunettes, which initially specialized in manufacturing sunglasses for third parties. Today, the Police brand is a business unit the De Rigo group of brands and companies

In 1997 Police launched its first perfume range and in 2003 its first watch collection. The company launched its first apparel collection in 2013.

The Police brand has been advertised by numerous celebrities, including Tamer Hosny, Paolo Maldini, Bruce Willis, George Clooney, David Beckham, Neymar, Ji Chang-wook and Antonio Banderas. Police is also a partner and team supplier of Mercedes-AMG Petronas Formula One Team in Formula 1
