= Century Time Gems =

Swiss watch company

Century Time Gems Ltd
- Formerly: Vacuum Chronometer Corporation
- Industry: Watch manufacturing
- Founded: 1966
- Founder: Hans-Ulrich Klingenberg
- Headquarters: Nidau, Switzerland
- Key people: Hans-Ulrich Klingenberg, Founder; Philip W. A. Klingenberg current company head
- Products: Watches

Century Time Gems Ltd was founded on January 5, 1966, by Hans-Ulrich Klingenberg, the first day upon the abolition of the "Statut horloger", which had prohibited the entry of newcomers into the watch industry in Switzerland for almost 40 years.

== Vacuum Chronometer Corporation ==
The company was initially called Vacuum Chronometer Corp., which manufactured vacuum watches (sold under several well-known trademarks), of his own invention: the air being the vector of moisture and all impurities as well as of temperature differences that impair the automatic movements' chronometer precision, Klingenberg had devised a watchcase, where a void of 80% could be created and maintained. According to the International Watch Marketing Director of luxury brand Cartier, Thierry Lamouroux, the efficiency of a watch is not improved until 99% of the air is removed from the case.

Furthering his vision of the perfected watch, Klingenberg soon started manufacturing such cases in boron carbide, followed by sapphire (corundum).

== The Century Timepiece ==
Upon the advance of quartz movements, vacuum automatic watches became much less in demand. But, being less bulky, quartz movements offered Klingenberg the opportunity to finally realize his perfect watch, creating a monolithic diamond-facetted watchcase of sapphire, applying another of his patents.

Located previously in Biel/Bienne, the company is now established in nearby Nidau, still in his family's hands, led by one of his sons.

The company is a full-fledged member of the Federation of the Swiss Watch Industry FH.
