= Venezianico =

Italian watchmaker

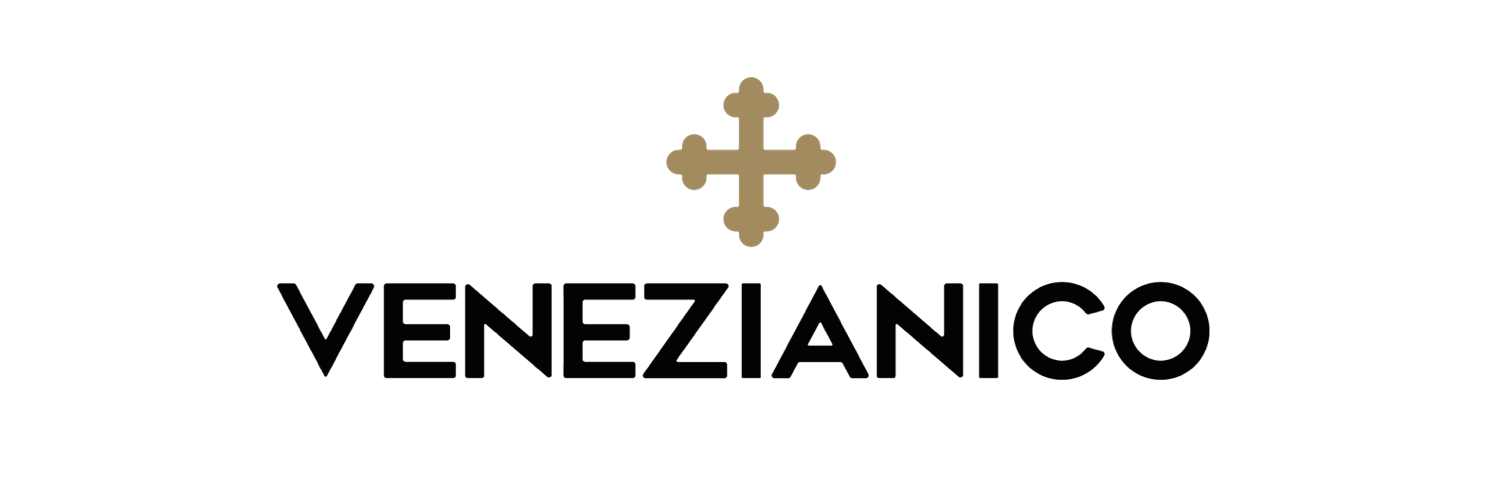
- Company type: Private
- Industry: Watchmaking
- Founded: 2017
- Headquarters: San Donà di Piave, Venezia, Italy
- Key people: Alberto Morelli (CEO)
- Products: Wristwatches
- Website: https://www.venezianico.com

Venezianico is an Italian watch brand that specializes in the production of mechanical wristwatches, headquartered in San Donà di Piave, in the metropolitan city of Venice.

== History ==
Venezianico was founded in 2017 by two brothers, Alberto Morelli and Alessandro Morelli. The company initially gained recognition through a crowdfunding campaign on Kickstarter, where it secured over $800,000 in funding.

Originally established as Meccaniche Veneziane, the brand officially adopted the name Venezianico in 2022. Before founding the company, the two founders conducted extensive research into the watchmaking industry, visiting workshops, independent suppliers, and specialized manufacturers to better understand the technical and artisanal processes behind mechanical watch production.

Over the years, the company expanded its production, reaching over 20,000 timepieces in 2023. Its products are distributed in more than 100 countries through an e-commerce platform and a network of authorized dealers.

In 2025, Venezianico introduced its first proprietary mechanical caliber, the V5000, created in collaboration with the Italian manufacturer OISA and produced in Italy. The movement required two years of development and involved engineer Fausto Berizzi, formerly of Lemania and Vaucher Manufacture.

In the same year, the company reported revenues of over €15 million, reflecting a 35% increase from 2024 (€11 million) and a 103% growth compared to 2023 (€7.4 million).
