= Franck Muller =

Swiss watchmaker

Franck Muller Watchland SA
- Company type: Private company
- Industry: Watch manufacturing
- Founded: 1991
- Headquarters: Geneva, Switzerland
- Key people: Franck Muller
- Products: Wristwatches; Jewelry
- Website: www.franckmuller.com

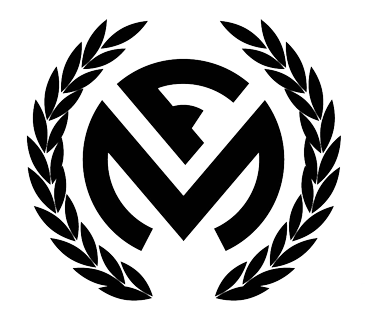
Alternative Franck Muller Logo, regularly seen on the clasps of the watch straps.

Franck Muller is a Swiss luxury watch manufacturer named after its founder. The company's estimated total sales (in 2010/2011) were €290 million in watches with an average unit price of €38,000. Franck Muller's watches are worn by various famous people, among them Arnold Schwarzenegger, Elton John, Cristiano Ronaldo, David Beckham, Kanye West, Conor McGregor, Floyd Mayweather, Paris Hilton, and Chris Brown.

== Biography ==
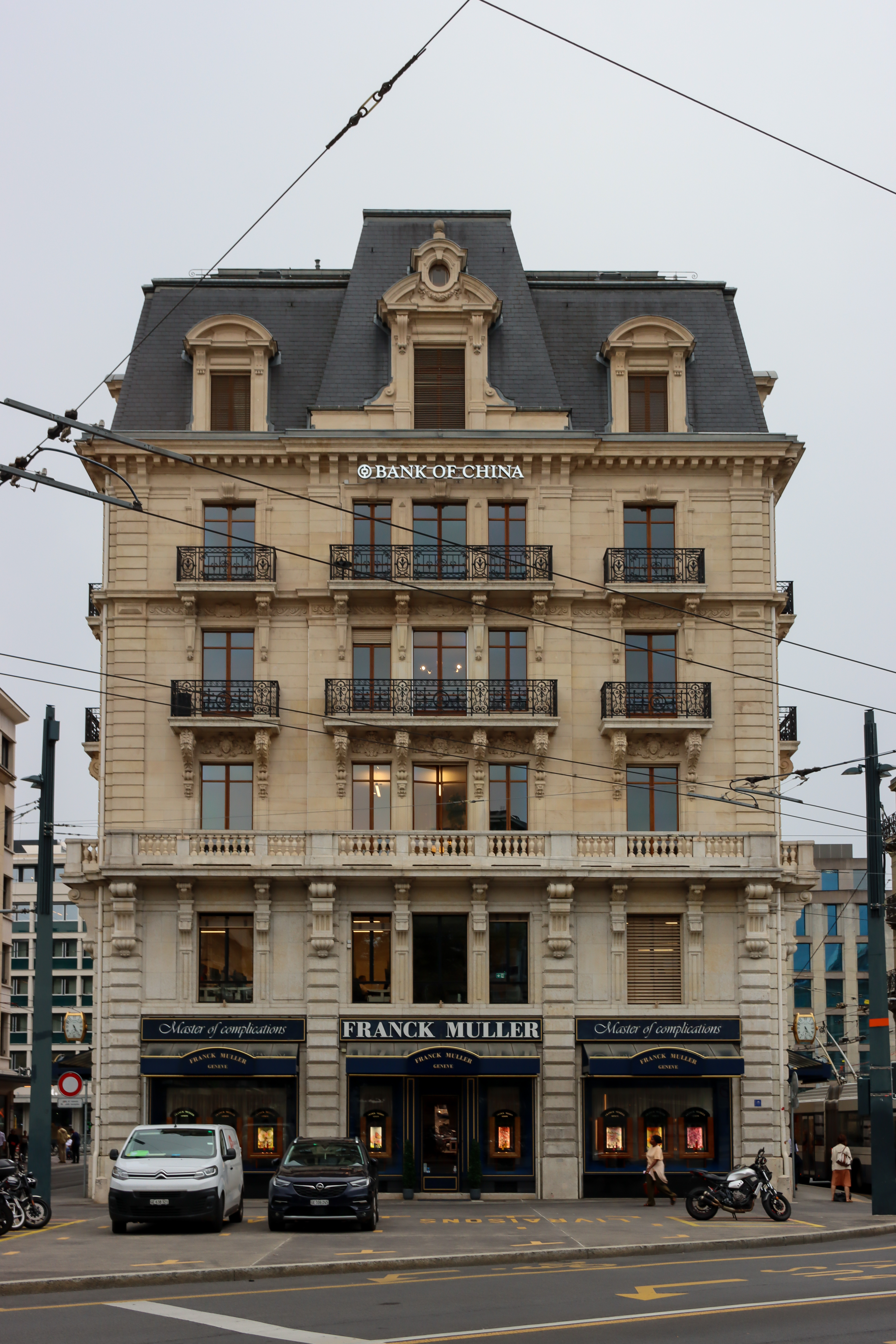
Shop in Geneva

The founder and former CEO of the brand, Franck Muller, was born in 1958. He spent his childhood in La Chaux-de-Fonds with his Italian mother and Swiss-born father. At 15, he enrolled in a watchmaking school. In the early 1980s, he graduated from the Watchmaking School of Geneva (French: Ecole d'Horlogerie de Genève). Afterwards, he began repairing top-quality pocket watches. Close to an independent watchmaker by the name of Svend Andersen, Franck Muller became responsible for handling watches from the collection of Patek Philippe. Most of the clientele were private individuals and museums. While he was working with complicated timepieces, he became passionate about their mechanisms and began to think of building his own workshop.

Soon after, in 1984, Franck Muller designed his own tourbillon wristwatch. In the 1980s, few watchmakers were capable of creating such complicated timepieces, among them Patek Philippe and Vacheron Constantin. The private clients of Franck Muller continued to come for new timepieces, and thus his business started growing. The House of Franck Muller opened in 1991, and his timepieces began to gain popularity in Europe and the United States. Today, his factory, which is also the headquarters of Franck Muller, produces a limited number of watches for private clientele. Franck Muller's collections include a variety of designs and price ranges. Now the company has five sites (Genthod, Lajoux, Les Bois, Plan-les-Ouates, Meyrin) and 570 official retailers.

== World premieres ==
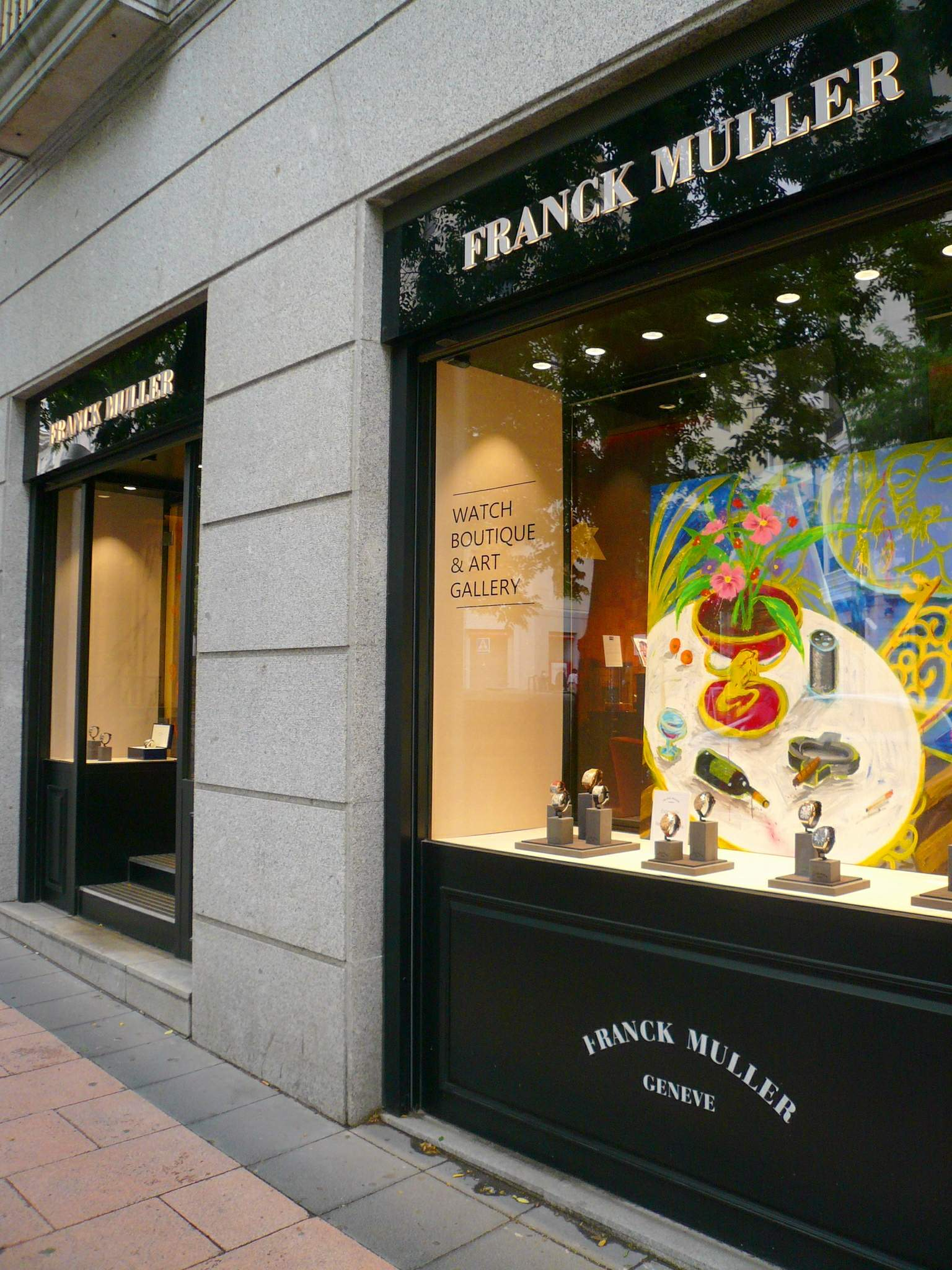
Franck Muller Boutique in Madrid, Spain

Franck Muller is also known for its "World Premiers". Each year, the manufacturer launches at least one new line of timepieces, featuring new and exclusive items. The first such world premiere was launched in 1993. The watches had a split seconds chronograph, a minute repeater, and a perpetual calendar. In addition, the watches included an indicator showing the internal temperature.

== Notable products ==
The brand of watches carries the slogan "Master of Complications". Franck Muller timepieces are famous for their fusion of "modern" style, mostly inspired by American watches from the thirties, like "Elgin tonneau", and traditional Swiss watch manufacturing.

Notable timepieces include Revolution2, Revolution3, Crazy Hours, and Colour Dreams. Further examples of Franck Muller's watches include the Endurance, which is a simple chronograph, the Master Banker, which is a tonneau-shaped watch capable of multiple time zone indication, and the Curvex Minute Repeater Tourbillon, whose production is limited to 25 pieces.

- Aeternitas
- Casablanca
- Color Dreams
- Conquistador
- Crazy Hours
- Curvex
- Long Island
- Master Banker
- Revolution2
- Revolution3
- Vanguard
- Encrypto, a watch that also works as cryptowallet.
