= Chinese standard movement =

Chinese mechanical watch movement

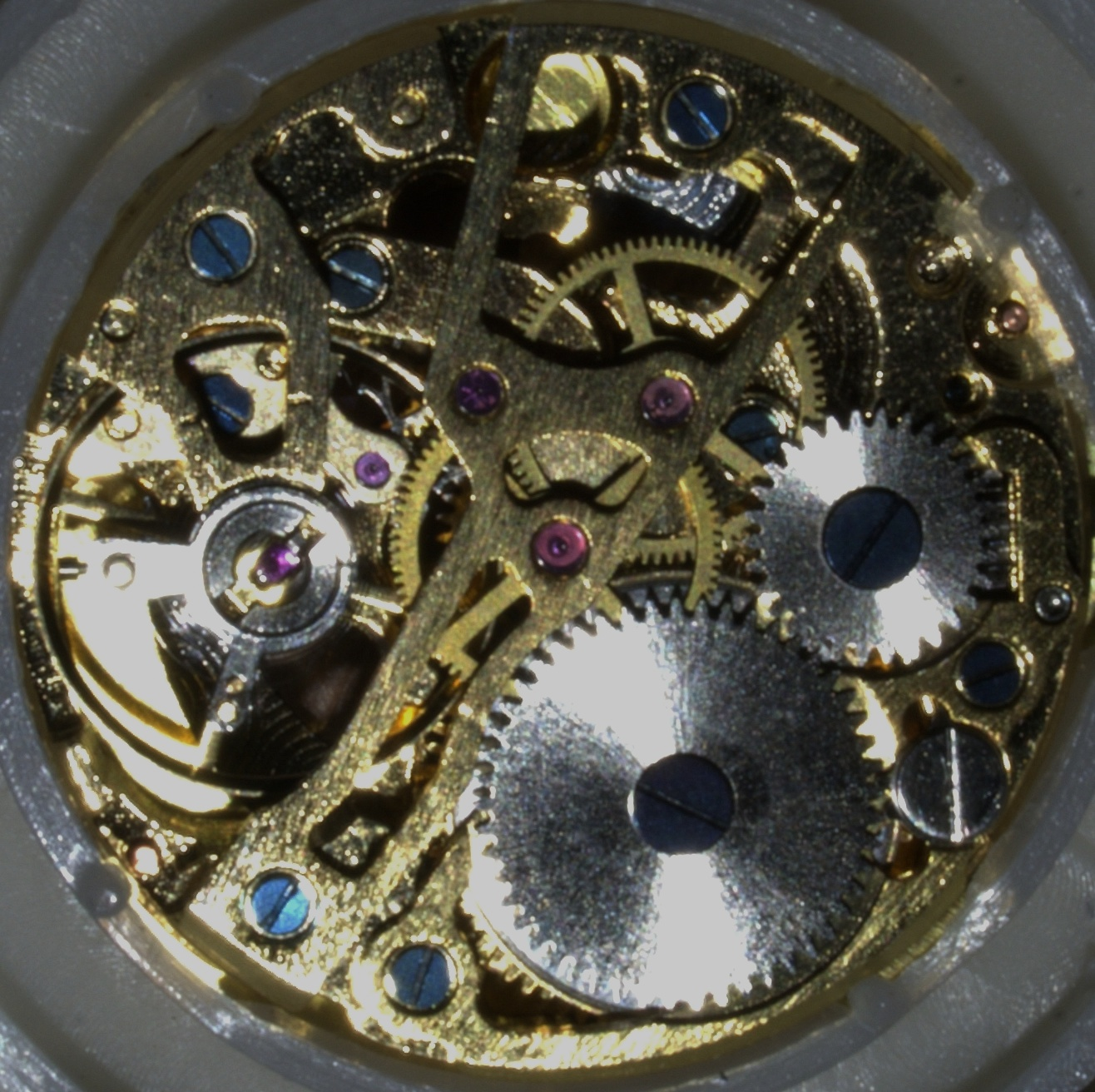
A typical lower-quality skeletonized variant of the Chinese Standard Movement, frequently found today in cheap mechanical watches mass-produced and marketed by a large number of brand names. Note the rough finishing of the movement. The white plastic spacer ring designed to hold and stabilize the movement in its case is clearly visible around the movement. (photo 2008)

The Chinese Standard Movement, also commonly known as the Tongji (Chinese: 统机, lit. 'unified mechanism') movement, is a mechanical watch movement that was developed in the People's Republic of China during its fourth Five-Year Plan in the 1970s. It was designed by engineers from several early Chinese watch factories as part of a Ministry of Light Industry initiative to consolidate the industry, and with a few exceptions it became mandatory for all factories to discontinue the production of their own movements and to mass-produce the standard movement. Because of this, the production of the standard movement defines an entire era in the history of Chinese watchmaking. Once the most commonly produced mechanical/automatic watch movements in China, the numbers produced and their quality (at least for a majority of produced movements) have since declined significantly; today the movement lives on typically in simple (even crude) automatic and skeletonized (i.e. using hollowed-out parts and segments such that the inner workings are more visible) variants, usually installed in cheaply produced watches made in China as well.

== History ==
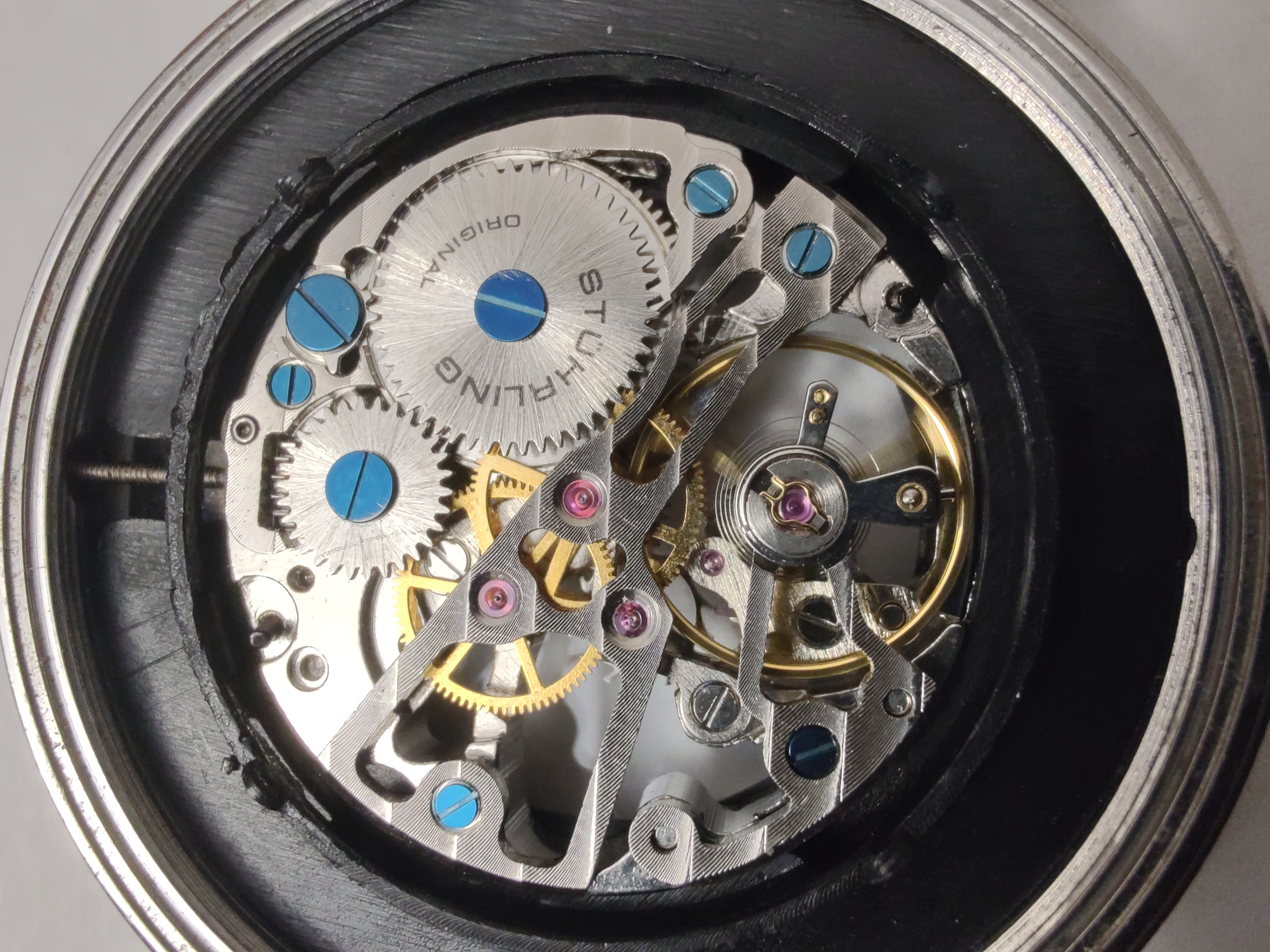
A skeletonized variant of the Chinese Standard Movement, this time in a higher-quality watch. Movement has been handled outside of the case, but metalwork and striations from finishing are still visible on this movement. (photo 2023)

=== Origins ===
By the late 1960s, the Chinese watch industry had matured, with good quality and quantity of output from various factories. To build upon this, the 4th Five Year Plan called for a program of 'consolidation' for the industry, in which a standardized watch design would be manufactured in factories in (almost) all provinces. The resultant movement is known as 统一机芯 (Tongyi Jixin, "Unified Movement") in Chinese, often abbreviated to 统机 (Tongji).

The prototype SZ-1 was developed by a design group formed by engineers from many units. The project commenced in 1969 under the guidance of the Ministry of Light Industry, drawing upon the resources of Shanghai Clock & Watch Industry Company, Shanghai Watch Factory, Shanghai No. 2 Watch Factory, Tianjin Clock & Watch Factory, Beijing, Liaoning, Guangzhou & Xi'an Hongqi Watch Factories, Xi'an Fenglei Meters & Watch Company, together with the Clock & Watch Research Institute of the Ministry of Light Industry in Xi'an, and the technicians and scholars of timing instruments of Tianjin University. The group studied many foreign watch designs and combined the merits of them for the prototype SZ-1. Blueprints were finalized in November 1971. The resultant design most closely resembles the Enicar AR1010, found in one of the limited range of Swiss watches sold in China at that time; however, there is no evidence of Enicar involvement in the SZ-1 project. A substantially larger version of the same design, designated HJ1A, was developed by Jilin Watch Factory for use in pocket watches.

=== Mass production ===
Once production of the new watch was established in existing factories, many new factories were built also to make the standard watch. In most factories the complete watch was manufactured in-house, thus the required skills and technologies were distributed more widely across the nation. By the end of the 1970s there were more than 30 complete watch manufacturing enterprises in China; and possibly as many as 50. Watch production in China increased from 6.564 million in 1974 to 33.01 million in 1982. About 82% of Chinese watches produced in 1983 had Standard movements.

=== Decline ===
Though the movement was the predominantly-produced watch movement in China until sometime in the 1980s, its manufacture was not immune to the quartz crisis of the watch industry that occurred during that decade; changes in economic policy, replacement designs, factory closings, and the re-purposing of a number of Chinese watch-producing facilities would contribute to declines in its manufacture. Furthermore, the return of Hong Kong to China in 1997 (until then, Hong Kong had been producing its own movements, both quartz and mechanical) also reduced the dominance of the Chinese Standard Movement in terms of numbers manufactured.

== Current production ==
This movement may be encountered today in its automatic and skeleton variants, mostly in watches whose list prices range between US$10–100. The quality of a majority of movements has declined significantly since its initial manufacture in the 1970s, and in spite of its design (which is considered to be very good) it has since earned a reputation for poor quality, mostly due to quality control and manufacturing quality issues of the facilities in China which still produce this movement.

New variants have been developed for the movement, long after its introduction. Its affordability and reliability have allowed it to remain popular and widely available, with modern watchmakers implementing advanced production techniques and materials in some models. Liaoning Watch Factory, for example, has created a new automatic Standard movement with an elaborately-redesigned bridge. as well as a new Standard-based "open-heart" movement, in which the balance has been relocated to the dial side and is visible through the dial.

In the present day, the movement is typically identified by its caliber, either 2650 (for the hand-winding mechanical version) or 7120 (for the rotor-driven automatic version) followed by suffixes for finish (e.g. G for skeletonized "gilt" or gold-toned,, S for skeletonized silver-toned,, and so on). These industrial designations are often used interchangeably, as they are effectively the same base movement. Skeletonized automatic versions may also be identified as the 2650-SZ or 2650-SSZ.

In 2008, the Shandong Liaocheng Zhong Tai Watch Company introduced a new skeleton version on a 33mm main plate with a simple auto-winding module on the 'magic-lever' principle. All of these variants have been enthusiastically adopted by the many new lower-priced Shenzhen-based brands such as Fineat, and some foreign watch companies such as Invicta.

== Significance of the Standard Movement ==
The project to establish the Standard watch originally aimed to make a steel-cased 17 jewel watch available to, and within the means of, almost any worker in the People's Republic of China. The often elaborate case-backs and signed crowns of many vintage Standard watches are a testimony to the pride of the local enterprises that built them.

The distributed production of a standard design via a vertically-integrated business model, i.e. a single enterprise building the whole watch, has provided a foundation of skills and technology on which the modern Chinese watch industry is built. With greater international market competition a greater horizontal integration in the industry has emerged, but this is possible only due to the skills and technology already in place.

== Production details and specifications ==
The standard movement was designed to have fewer parts than other similar movements, so that it was easier to produce and service, while at the same time maintaining high accuracy and reliability. The basic specification of the Standard wristwatch caliber is a minimum of 17 jewels, 21,600 bph (beats per hour) escapement, a minimum 40-hour power reserve and an average rate within +/-30 seconds per day.

The movement is manufactured in a number of grades (from high to low) in both automatic and manual-winding forms. Initially manufactured exclusively by Chinese companies (i.e. state-controlled watch manufacturers), variants of the Chinese Standard Movement can be found in all grades and both forms, including in a number of watches whose marques are not Chinese but are still manufactured in China.

== See also ==
- Manufacture d'horlogerie
- Orient Watch
- Citizen Watch
