= Swiss watchmaking industry =

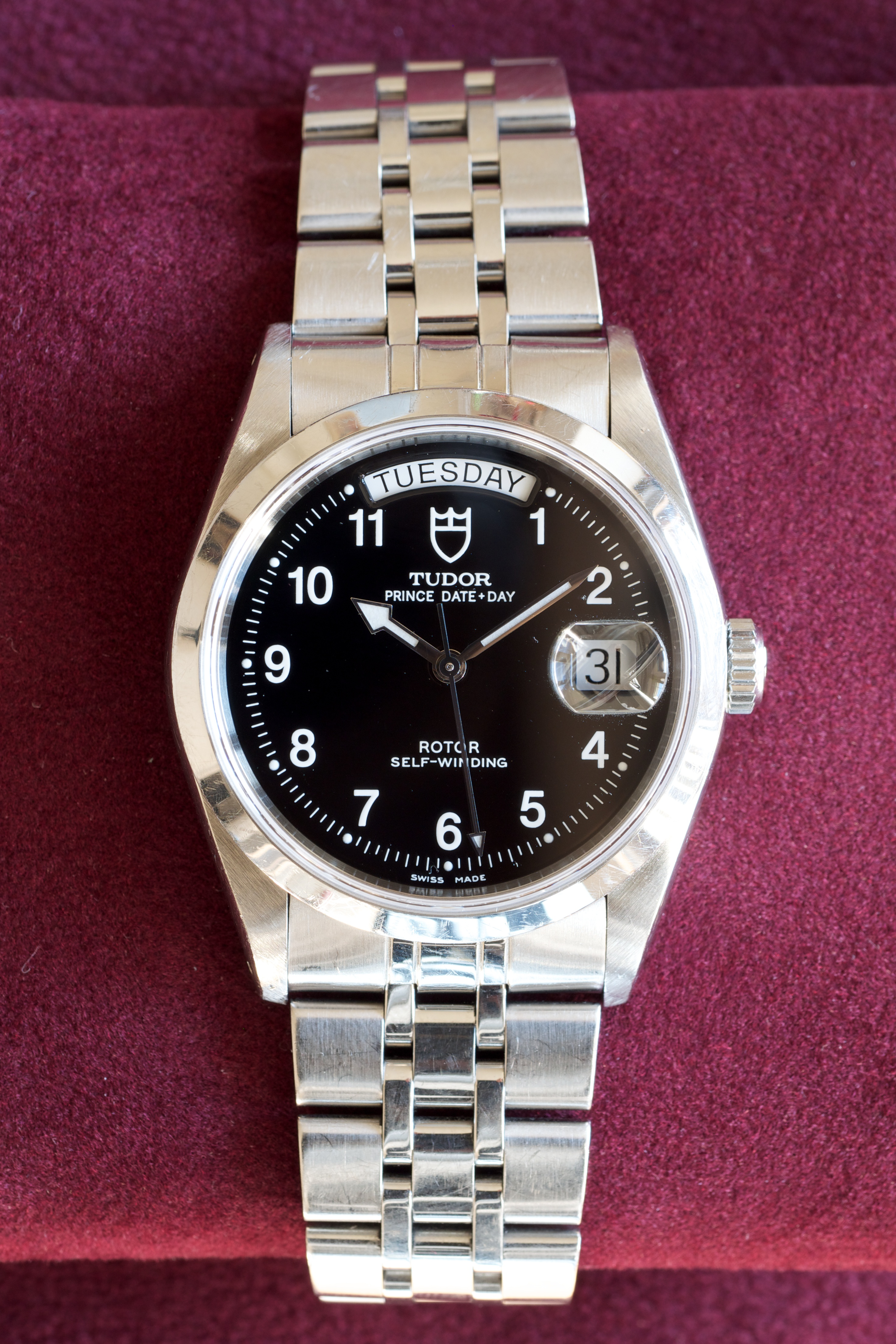
Wristwatch Tudor Prince Date Day

The Swiss watchmaking industry is a major manufacturing sector in Switzerland that produces luxury timepieces and components. Operating primarily in the premium and luxury segments, the industry accounts for approximately 4% of Switzerland's GDP and represents the country's third-largest export sector after chemicals and pharmaceuticals, and machinery. In terms of value, Switzerland is the world's largest exporter of watches, though it produces only about 2% of global watch volume.

== History ==
=== Origins and early development ===
The origins of Swiss watchmaking trace back to the mid-16th century and the Protestant Reformation in Geneva. When Jean Calvin forbade the wearing of jewelry around 1550, goldsmiths and jewelers in the region redirected their skills toward watchmaking. Huguenot refugees arriving in Geneva brought expertise in portable timepiece production, and the craft's affinity with local goldsmithing traditions facilitated the development of time measurement arts.

A division of labor emerged by 1660. Case makers and engravers formed their own guilds in 1698 and 1716 respectively, while women, excluded from these professions until 1785, worked as chain makers and joined the watchmakers' guild created in 1601. By the late 17th century, Genevan watchmakers focused exclusively on finishing, outsourcing the production of blanks to neighboring valleys in the Jura Mountains, Pays de Gex, and Faucigny.

Geneva's watchmaking industry reached its peak between 1770 and 1786, with products known throughout the Orient and the American colonies. The annexation of Geneva to France in 1798 ended the guild system and triggered a period of crisis and unemployment.

=== Expansion across the Jura Arc ===
From the 17th century onward, watchmaking spread throughout the Jura Arc. In the Neuchâtel Mountains, the craft developed from the 18th century, gradually challenging Genevan dominance. The absence of guilds created an attractive environment for Genevan entrepreneurs. Local expertise derived from metalworking trades including locksmithing, gunsmithing, and nail making.

Entire families engaged in watchmaking, developing apprenticeship practices and professional alliances. From the Neuchâtel Mountains, the industry spread to the Saint-Imier valley and western Franches-Montagnes. Following the annexation of the Prince-Bishopric of Basel to France, commerce in Jura villages of the Mont-Terrible department declined but revived after 1815, extending from Tavannes to Ajoie.

The 19th century saw watchmaking develop in the cantons of Bern (Saint-Imier valley, Franches-Montagnes, Ajoie, Bienne) and Solothurn (Granges region) from mid-century. By 1890, nearly half of Swiss watch and movement exports originated from Bernese establishments, making the region a new center of gravity for a rapidly modernizing industry. With advancing mechanization in the late 19th century, the watch industry expanded beyond the Jura Arc to Basel-Landschaft and Schaffhausen. In the 20th century, the watchmaking geography stabilized with over 90% of workers concentrated in the Jura Arc.

=== Industrialization and the American challenge ===
The transition from craft production to factory-based manufacturing occurred in the late 19th century as a response to American advances. Since the mid-19th century, American manufacturers had achieved progress in standardization, component machining, and mass production of inexpensive watches. This competition nearly proved fatal to the Swiss industry—watch exports to the United States plummeted from 18.3 million francs in 1872 to 3.5-4 million francs in 1877–1878.

The technical and organizational foundations for large-scale manufacturing were established in the Bernese Jura and at the foot of the Jura. New centers emerged with large manufactures employing hundreds of workers recruited from rural areas. In 1883, of the 97 watch establishments subject to the federal factory work law, 46 were in Canton Bern and 11 in Canton Solothurn.

This conversion to mechanized serial production significantly affected the labor market. Workers defended their rights through strikes (193 between 1884 and 1914) and unionization. The Workers in the Watch Industry Federation (ancestor of the Swiss Metal and Watch Workers Federation, then the Union of Industry, Construction and Services from 1912, then Unia from 2005) was founded in 1912 with 17,000 members, representing nearly one-third of the workforce.

The Swiss response to American competition proved flexible, establishing a dualistic development model: traditional centers continued cultivating fine watchmaking (luxury watches, special finishes, complications, and high-precision pieces) while integrated factories produced mechanized mid-range and entry-level watches.

=== 20th century crises and restructuring ===
The industry faced severe challenges during the 1921-1923 crisis, the Great Depression of the 1930s, and rising protectionism. These circumstances accelerated the cartelization movement begun in the interwar period. Holdings emerged in the late 1920s, including Ebauches SA and the Swiss Watch Industry Company. The creation of the Swiss Watch Fiduciary (Fidhor) in 1928 regulated relations between banking and watchmaking circles. Collective agreements managed production, pricing, and export policies. In 1931, a "superholding" called the General Company of Swiss Watchmaking (Asuag) was established, creating a near-monopoly on the production of blanks and regulating parts. With federal government support, this regime, designed to combat foreign competition, was characterized by conventional regulation of relationships between production branches.

=== The quartz crisis ===
With the electronic revolution, the sector experienced a structural crisis that turned the watchmaking arc into a distressed region. Employment, approximately 70,000 in the mid-1960s, collapsed and stabilized around 30,000 to 35,000 people during the 1980s. Caught off guard by Japanese producers, the Swiss, who did not believe in quartz watches despite mastering its technology, were forced to embrace microelectronics.

The first prototypes of quartz wristwatches, appearing in 1967, came from a Neuchâtel laboratory, the Centre électronique horloger SA. The years 1979-1980 marked the balance between mechanical and electronic watches. The industry's recovery came through mass-market models, particularly Swatch watches, followed from the 2000s by exponential interest in luxury models, especially in emerging markets.

=== Product evolution ===
The watch has become increasingly democratized. In the 19th century, the railway revolution and progress in factory work, regulated in duration, imposed its generalized use, while rising living standards made it accessible to all. The inexpensive but well-made Roskopf watch (Georges-Frédéric Roskopf), "the worker's watch," was created in 1867.

Numerous technical innovations in escapements, materials, and assembly methods, accompanied by product innovations, reached an increasingly vast and diversified clientele. The 1920s saw the rise of the wristwatch, which moved beyond military use to supplant the pocket watch. An automatic caliber was produced in Granges in 1926, while electric models appeared in 1952. The Oris pin-pallet escapement watch was launched in 1938; in 1969, a plastic watch (Fortis) was introduced, and Swatch, the "small electronic watch in injected plastic," became a high-tech mass product, conceived between 1979 and 1982.

=== Research and development ===
In the 20th century, an important phase of industrial research began with the creation in 1921 of a private and communal testing and research laboratory, the Laboratoire de recherches horlogères, established through the initiative of Neuchâtel's academic community. This laboratory soon offered its services to the entire Swiss watch industry. The advent of electronics and the prospects associated with quartz led to the founding of the Centre électronique horloger SA in Neuchâtel in 1962. These organizations, along with the Swiss Foundation for Microtechnology Research (1978), merged in 1984 to form the Swiss Center for Electronics and Microtechnology.

Increased public intervention became necessary to revive the regional and national industry after the mid-1970s crisis. Through federal funding of projects involving miniaturization of electronic components and adaptation of transistors and integrated circuits, a diversification movement began. By the end of the millennium, demonstrating the relevance of restructuring choices made in the 1970s and 1980s for maintaining a competitive industry, one-third of establishments were active, wholly or partially, in domains not directly related to watchmaking.

== Industry structure ==
=== Contemporary organization ===
Most Swiss manufacturers and brands, overseen by large groups (Swatch Group, Movado Group, Richemont, LVMH), do not possess their own production sites. They function as établisseurs (assemblers) who source components—mechanical and quartz movements, and for casing, dials, hands, and bracelets—sometimes of foreign origin, particularly from Asia. Controlling or subcontracting assembly, casing, and fitting, they concentrate on marketing and distribution.

The industrial fabric is characterized by the dominance of small and medium enterprises, with an average of 60 people per establishment. The proportion of men and women employed is practically equal.

=== Major players ===
There are approximately 700 watchmaking companies in Switzerland, most based in Geneva and the Jura region. Many watch brands have been acquired by conglomerates including:

- LVMH Swiss Manufactures SA (TAG Heuer, Hublot, Zenith, Bulgari)
- Swatch Group (Omega, Longines, Tissot, Blancpain, Swatch)
- Richemont (Cartier, IWC Schaffhausen, Jaeger-LeCoultre, Piaget)

Rolex is among the top-selling global brands, followed by Omega, Cartier, Audemars Piguet, Patek Philippe, and Longines.

== Economic significance ==
=== Export performance ===
Despite facing severe conversion crises, Swiss watchmaking has maintained a leading position in the global market. Around 1870, it supplied approximately three-quarters of world production by volume and two-thirds by value. In the early 21st century, it remains the world's leading exporter by value but accounts for only a small fraction of global watch volume.

In 2022, the watchmaking industry was valued at over CHF 24 billion, making it Switzerland's third-largest export sector. Half of the 16 million Swiss watches exported annually go to Asia, with the other half to Europe and the United States. The vast majority are sold to the United States and China. Wristwatches generate 95% of the industry's export revenue, with an average cost exceeding US$1,500 per item. Watches priced above US$3,000 constitute the largest share of exports.

=== Employment and workforce ===
The Swiss watch industry employs approximately 60,000 people and generates around CHF 25 billion in sales. Including indirect employment, more than 100,000 jobs in Switzerland depend on watchmaking. The industry is primarily concentrated in the cantons of Neuchâtel, Bern, Geneva, Solothurn, Jura, and Vaud, where it generates over 90% of the sector's added value.

Foreign workers have been essential to the industry. Since the 1960s, cross-border workers have played an important role in staffing watchmaking enterprises, particularly in the Jura Arc.

=== Markets ===
The industry's success is based on an inexhaustible ability to adapt to changing demand and assiduous geographic diversification of markets. In 2010, Europe and Asia were the principal clients, purchasing respectively 31% and 53% of Swiss production.

The opening of the Chinese market at the turn of the 2000s provided significant momentum for Swiss watch exports to Asia. Export values to China increased over 100 fold during this period.

== Regulatory framework ==
=== The watch statute ===
The Swiss Federal Council intervened several times, notably through financial aid for the creation of the Allgemeine Gesellschaft der Schweizerischen Uhrenindustrie (Asuag). During the global crisis peaking in 1932, it took measures to end the anarchy hampering watch production. The federal decree of March 12, 1934 subjected the opening and expansion of businesses and the export of supplies, blanks, and templates to a permit regime. With subsequent measures through 1937, this legislation became known as the watch statute.

Conceived in 1978 to assist Jura Arc regions affected by the severe 1975 structural crisis, the Bonny decree was renewed in 1994 and 2000. However, once tied to the protectionist regime, federal legislation abandoned its cartel vision to become promotional.

=== Swiss Made label ===
The "Swiss Made" label, whose criteria are defined in a 1971 ordinance revised in 1992, requires a Swiss movement, even if certain components are of foreign origin (Swiss components representing a minimum of 50% of value and assembly in the country).

=== Quality control ===
Various mechanisms aim to influence the elevation of quality and precision standards: development of services provided by observatories, control and guarantee of precious metal content. A Standards Office for the Watch Industry was created in 1958; in 1972, the Association for the Official Swiss Chronometer Control was established, accredited in 1994 by the Federal Office of Metrology.

== Bibliography ==
- Fallet-Scheurer, Marius: Le travail à domicile dans l'horlogerie suisse et ses industries annexes. Rapport final publié au nom du comité d'organisation des expositions de Zurich et de Bâle de l'industrie à domicile (1909), 1912.
- Jaquet, Eugène; Chapuis, Alfred; Berner, Georges-Albert: Histoire et technique de la montre suisse. De ses origines à nos jours, 1945.
- Jequier, François; Schindler-Pittet, Chantal: De la forge à la manufacture horlogère (XVIIIe-XXe siècles). Cinq générations d'entrepreneurs de la vallée de Joux au cœur d'une mutation industrielle, 1983.
- Landes, David Saul: L'heure qu'il est. Les horloges, la mesure du temps et la formation du monde moderne, 1987 (English 1983).
- Gruner, Erich (ed.): Arbeiterschaft und Wirtschaft in der Schweiz, 1880-1914. Soziale Lage, Organisation und Kämpfe von Arbeitern und Unternehmern, politische Organisation und Sozialpolitik, vol. 2, 1988, pp. 479–528.
- Piotet, Georges: Restructuration industrielle et corporatisme. Le cas de l'horlogerie en Suisse, 1974-1987, 1988.
- Barrelet, Jean-Marc; Ramseyer, Jacques: La Chaux-de-Fonds, ou, Le défi d'une cité horlogère, 1848-1914, 1990.
- Crevoisier, Olivier: La transformation de l'industrie horlogère dans l'Arc jurassien suisse de 1960 à 1990, 1990.
- Cardinal, Catherine; Jequier, François et al. (dir.): L'homme et le temps en Suisse, 1291-1991, 1991.
- Richon, Marco: Omega saga, 1999.
- Perret, Thomas; Beyner, André et al.: Microtechniques et mutations horlogères. Clairvoyance et ténacité dans l'Arc jurassien. Un siècle de recherche communautaire à Neuchâtel, 2000.
- Forrer, Max; Bauer, Gérard Francis et al.: L'aventure de la montre à quartz. Mutation technologique initiée par le Centre Electronique Horloger, Neuchâtel, 2002.
- Koller, Christophe: L'industrialisation et l'Etat au pays de l'horlogerie. Contribution à l'histoire économique et sociale d'une région suisse. «De la lime à la machine», 2003.
- Pasquier, Hélène: La «recherche et développement» en horlogerie. Acteurs, stratégies et choix technologiques dans l'Arc jurassien suisse (1900-1970), 2008.
- Donzé, Pierre-Yves: Histoire de l'industrie horlogère suisse. De Jacques David à Nicolas Hayek (1850-2000), 2009.
- Lachat, Stephanie: Les pionnières du temps. Vies professionnelles et familiales des ouvrières de l'industrie horlogère suisse (1870-1970), 2014.
- Donzé, Pierre-Yves: L'invention du luxe. Histoire de l'industrie horlogère à Genève de 1815 à nos jours, 2017.
- Marti, Laurence: Le renouveau horloger. Contribution à une histoire récente de l'horlogerie suisse (1980-2015), 2017.
- Mahrer, Stefanie: Artisans de la modernité. Des horlogers juifs à La Chaux-de-Fonds (1800-1914), 2018.
- Donzé, Pierre-Yves: Des nations, des firmes et des montres. Histoire globale de l'industrie horlogère de 1850 à nos jours, 2020.
