= Endura Watch Factory =

Swiss watch manufacturer in The Swatch Group

Endura S.A.
- Trade name: Endura Watch Factory
- Type: Subsidiary
- Industry: Watchmaking
- Founded: 1966
- Headquarters: Biel/Bienne, Switzerland
- Key people: Pierre-André Bühler, President
- Parent: The Swatch Group
- Website: endura.ch

Endura S.A. is Swiss watch manufacturer founded in 1966 by General Watch Company (GWC) in Biel/Bienne, Switzerland, for the purpose of manufacturing watches under "private label". This company was also part of the merger between ASUAG and SSIH into SMH, now the Swatch Group. Now attached to ETA SA Manufacture horlogère Suisse, Endura SA is the private label and licensing division of the Swatch Group.
