= General Watch Co =

General Watch Co. (GWC) was the watch companies holding of ASUAG.

== History ==
ASUAG had been founded in 1931, with the assistance of the Swiss government and the Swiss banks, to combat the severe economic crisis and ensuing unemployment by means of refinancing (thus eliminate the deadly "dumping for survival" murderous competition within the still somewhat "cottage industry"-like status of a majority of the movements and parts thereof supplying companies) and complementary research and development programs in their respective companies.

Its mandate was to maintain, improve and develop the Swiss watch industry.

ASUAG also expanded gradually through the purchase of ebauches manufactures (movement blanks), movement parts manufactures (e.g. balance wheels, assortments, rubies) and a number of assemblers and manufacturers of complete watches, that were subsequently brought together under the subsidiary “GWC General Watch Co. Ltd.”

(This company was formed in 1971 and should not be confused with the General Watch Co or La Generale formed in 1895 which changed its name to the Helvetia Watch Co in 1949)

=== Affiliated watch brands and companies ===
- A. Reymond S.A. or ARSA
- Atlantic S.A.
- Certina
- Diantus (now production subsidiary of the Swatch Group)
- Edox
- Endura
- Eterna
- Hamilton
- Longines
- Microma
- Mido
- Oris
- Rado
- Roamer
- Rotary (later sold to Citychamp and then Peers Hardy Group)
- Technos

== Merger with SSIH into SMH ==
However, it proved difficult to implement a common industrial policy for the subsidiaries concerned. Following repeated crises in the Swiss watch industry, by the 1970s ASUAG (as well as SSIH, the other major Swiss Watch holding company) was once again in trouble. Foreign competition, in particular the Japanese watch industry, with its mass production of cheap new electronic products and new technology, was rapidly establishing a strong foothold in the market.

Eventually, both ASUAG and SSIH faced amalgamation: thus, in 1983 “GWC General Watch Co.” and its affiliated watch brands and factories, were merged with its parent company ASUAG, together with SSIH, creating the ASUAG/SSIH entity, later renamed SMH (the Swatch Group since 1998) under the patronage of the Swiss Banks that were at the time financially involved.

== Spin-offs ==
Some companies had however beforehand made themselves again independent or having been sold off, namely:

- A. Reymond
- Atlantic
- Edox
- Eterna
- Oris
- Roamer
- Rotary
- Technos
