= Linde Werdelin =

Swiss-Danish watchmaker

- Type: Independent
- Industry: Watchmaking
- Founded: 2002
- Headquarters: London & Copenhagen,
- Key people: Morten Linde; Jorn Werdelin
- Products: Mechanical timepieces and digital sports instruments
- Website: LindeWerdelin.com

Linde Werdelin is a luxury Swiss-Danish watchmaker founded in 2002 by Morten Linde and Jorn Werdelin. They specialize in crafting limited and numbered series of watches and instruments. Linde Werdelin watches are made in Switzerland by Danish designers. By combining analog and digital technologies, Linde Werdelin produces and manufactures mechanical watches along with instruments for skiing and diving that can be clipped onto the top of the watch. Linde Werdelin creates limited and numbered editions of up to 100 pieces.

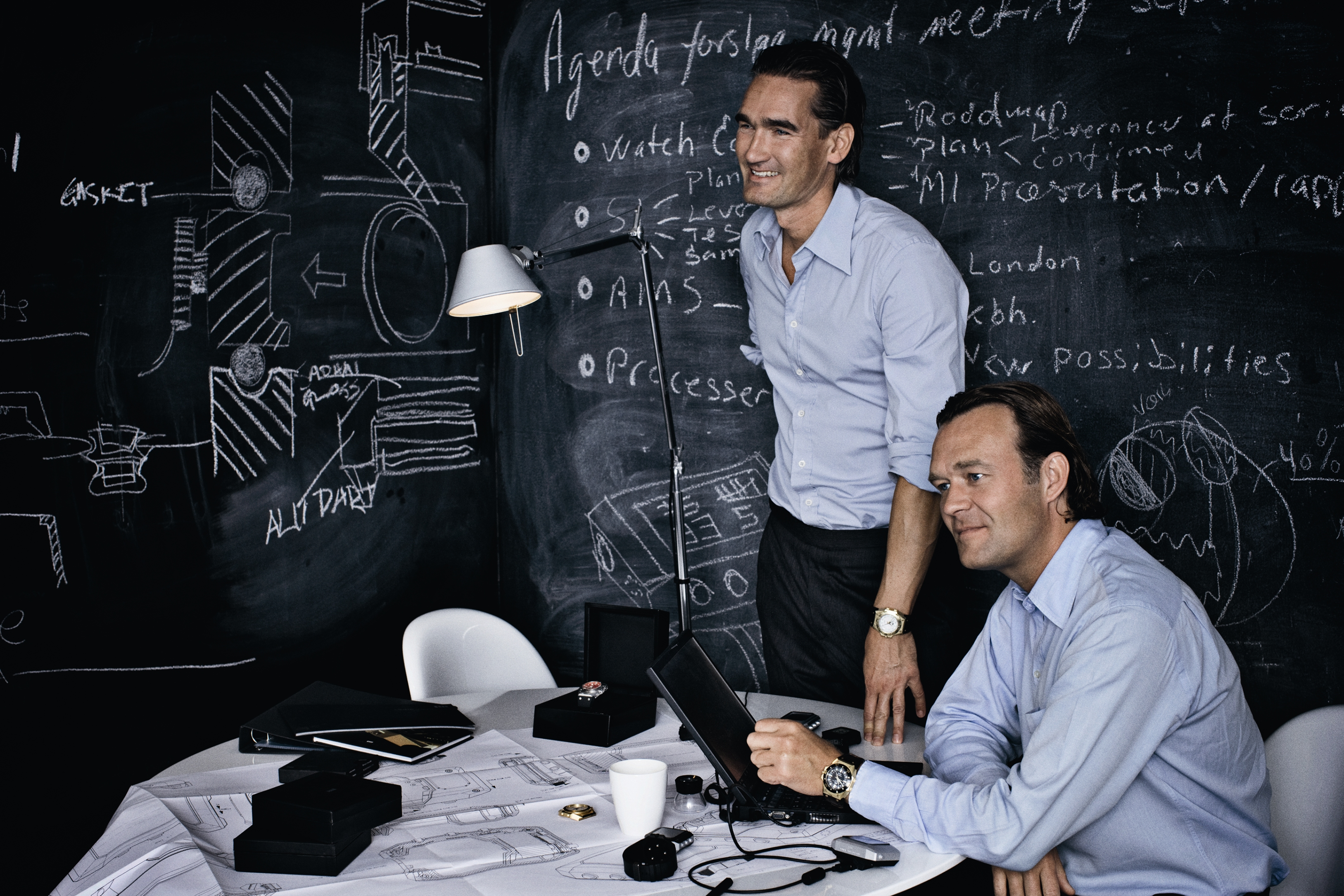
Morten Linde and Jorn Werdelin

== The idea ==
Linde Werdelin is a watch and instrument company founded by two Danes, Morten Linde and Jorn Werdelin. The idea was born out of a skiing accident when, in 1996, Jorn Werdelin, a keen mountaineer and off-piste skier, was taken by surprise in a bout of bad weather, got lost, skied off a cliff, and broke his back.

In 2002, he partnered with Morten Linde around the idea of a high-end sports watch that could, when required, be combined with a digital instrument to provide information for skiing or diving.

The ‘watch-plus-instrument’ idea took five years of research and development before the first Linde Werdelin watch collection went to market in 2006. Linde Werdelin is the only high-end watch company producing digital instruments for skiing and diving. They work with professional mountaineers and divers for product testing and development. Linde Werdelin watches and instruments were used on the first-ever confirmed free climb to the summit of Mount Everest in 2007.

== Collections ==
The Linde Werdelin watch collection is split between two main groups: the Spido and Oktopus family. The Spidos are further sub-divided into the SpidoSpeeds, which have chronograph complications, and the SpidoLites. The Oktopus are sub-divided into the Double Date and Moonphase which have differing complications.

All their watches can also carry both digital instruments as well as be worn with any Linde Werdelin strap. The digital instruments are the Reef (for diving) and the Rock (for skiing) and can be considered to be acting as external complications for the watches. While all Linde Werdelin watches are made entirely in Switzerland, the instruments are developed in-house in Denmark.

Linde Werdelin is also known for their DLC (diamond-like carbon) watches. Their first series of Hard Black DLC watches was launched in October 2008 and sold out instantly.

Another aspect of Linde Werdelin, especially prevalent in the Spido family, is the extreme skeletonisation of the case, which is done both for style and to lighten the watch dramatically. This increases the sports aspect and Jorn and Morten found their inspiration for this in the Formula One industry. Further reference to the motor racing industry is evident in the SpidoSpeed, from the material used on the dial (which was previously used as dashboards in 1940s racing cars) to the small holes on the subdials resembling the brake discs to the round cut-out details on the strap which make reference to driving gloves.

Announced at BaselWorld, Linde Werdelin is launching three new watches for 2014 – two of these are in the Spido family and the other is an Oktopus.

The SpidoSpeed Rose Gold Black and SpidoSpeed Green take that idea of skeletonization further than was previously seen in the SpidoLite Tech. These new Spidos are skeletonised not just in the outercase but also into the dial and movement.

The Linde Werdelin Oktopus is characterised by being able to go down to great depths and the Oktopus MoonLite is no different. It is made from a special alloy called ALW which makes this the lightest Linde Werdelin ever, weighing in at 62.5 grams total for case and movement.

== Movement ==
Linde Werdelin watches are exclusively made in Switzerland. In the beginning, ETA SA provided 2892.A2 to implant on earlier models. This movement is a movement produced by ETA (less than four seconds per day during quality control). Linde Werdelin is working with independent watch-makers to craft precision and custom-made movements and it has a very transparent policy that it does not aspire to make any movements itself but would rather prefer to make their watches using the best suppliers available.

At BaselWorld 2009, Linde Werdelin presented the SpidoLite, which comes with a vintage movement modified by Svend Andersen of Andersen Geneve and founder of AHCI. This marked the beginning of Linde Werdelin’s ongoing collaboration with independent watch makers.

At BaselWorld 2010 Linde Werdelin launched another movement to realise the first high-end mechanical diving watch with a moonphase, the Oktopus Moonphase. Linde Werdelin launched a series of 29 pieces of the Oktopus Moonphase, with the moonphase complication being built by Danish watchmaker Svend Andersen. It was designed by Frédéric Piguet, known for producing high-end complications. Brands like Breguet, for example, are using Frédéric Piguet complications in their watches. At BaselWorld 2011 Linde Werdelin launched the LW03. This movement is made by an independent Swiss manufacturer called Concepto, realised by Valérien Jaquet. From a watchmaking family, Jaquet has realized this movement only for Linde Werdelin to carry the SpidoSpeed Chronograph. The LW03 carries a calendar and a small second.
