= Valjoux =

Swiss manufacturer of watch movements

- Native name: Valjoux
- Company type: Private (subsidiary of The Swatch Group Ltd.)
- Industry: Watch movement manufacturing; Ébauche manufacturing; Watch parts manufacturing
- Headquarters: L'Abbaye, canton of Vaud, Switzerland
- Parent: The Swatch Group Ltd.

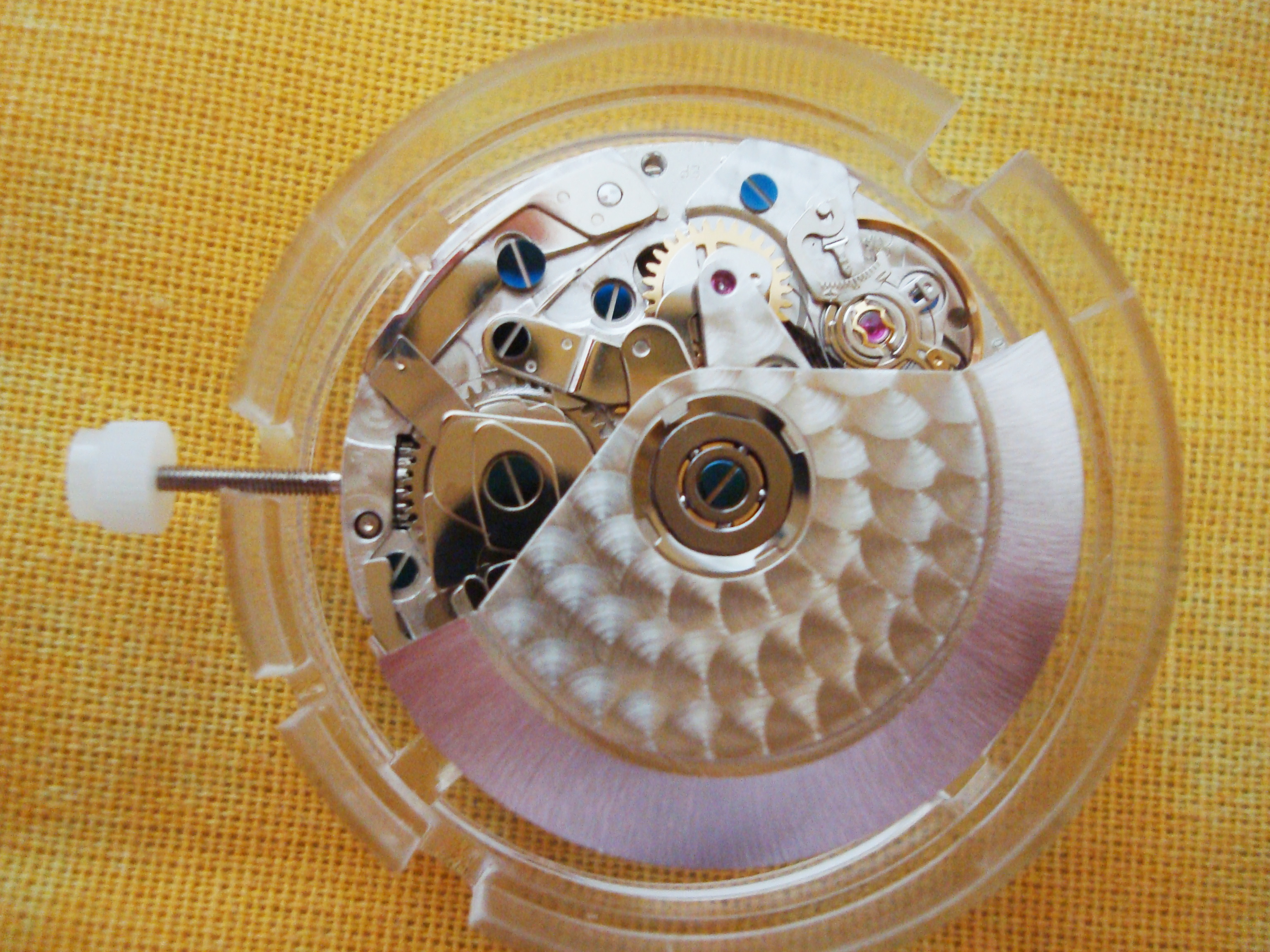
ETA/Valjoux 7750 (photo 2009)

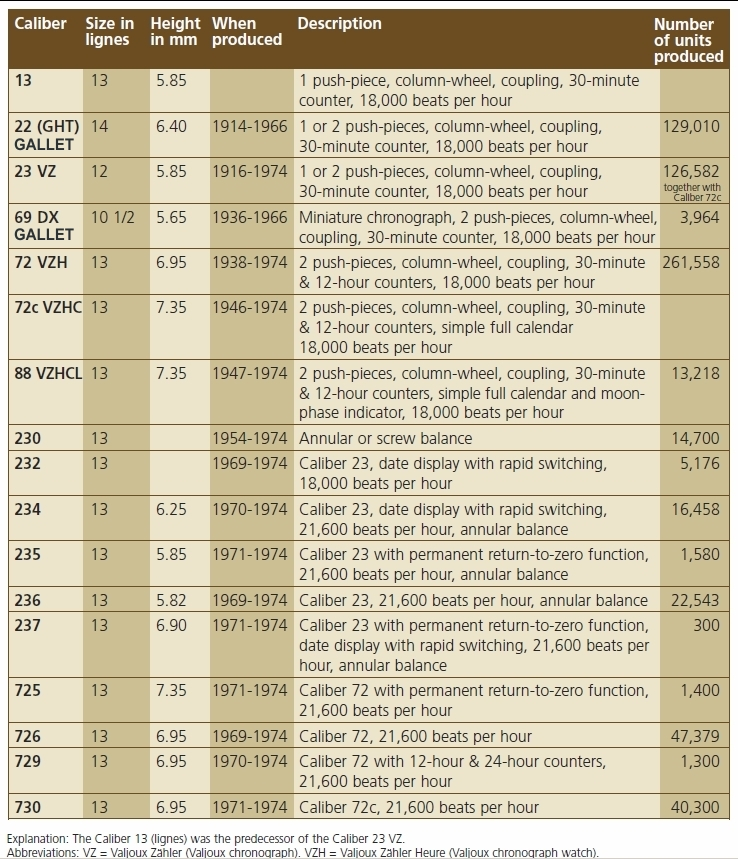
Chart of historic Valjoux movements

Valjoux (for Vallée de Joux, "Joux Valley") is a Swiss manufacturer of mechanical watch movements, based in L'Abbaye, in the canton of Vaud, Switzerland, located in the Jura-Nord Vaudois district in the Vallée de Joux. It is known primarily for chronograph ébauche movements that are used in a number of mid- to high-range mechanical watches. The company is a part of ETA, and is a member of the Swatch Group. Historically, Valjoux provided the movements for early Rolex Daytona references e.g. 6263.

== Valjoux 7750 ==
Valjoux is responsible for the design and manufacture of the Valjoux 7750 movement (and variants), an extremely popular movement used in many mechanical chronograph watches.

The Valjoux 7750 is different from most other chronograph movements, using the three-plane cam system rather than the column wheel. It is constructed of a mainplate, calendar plate, and chronograph top plate. Levers push a cam back and forth, driving the stopwatch mechanism of the Valjoux 7750. This is referred to as a coulisse-lever escapement. The Valjoux 7750 is the first watch movement developed using computer-assisted design. In the 1980s, many companies began using the Valjoux 7750 because it was easier to mass-produce and distribute in high volume. The Valjoux 7750 can be created in several different displays, including adding or eliminating a date window or adding or subtracting a subdial. Watch companies can purchase the movement and alter it in house if they desire.

Some watch brands that use base movements manufactured by Valjoux include Appella, Breitling, Christopher Ward, Cyma Watches, Deep Blue Watches, Dreyfuss & Co., Fortis, Gallet, Glycine, Hamilton Watch, IWC, Steinhart, Invicta Watch Group, Junghans, Longines, Louis Erard, Mido, NIXON Inc., Omega, Oris, Panerai, Porsche Design, Sector No Limits, Sinn, TAG Heuer, Tissot, Tutima, Xezo, and Zodiac Watches.

There are also a large number of derivative chronograph movements based on the Valjoux 7750 base. These include ETA's own Valgranges, designed for larger watches, as well as the following third-party movements:

- Alfred Rochat for Chronoswiss (C. 732 or C. 741, C 741 by Rochat)
- Damasko (fitting a silicon main spring to the 7750)
- Dreyfuss & Co. (Have a range of 7750 Valjoux watches)
- Fortis (developed by Paul Gerber, featuring an alarm and two springs)
- Franck Muller (for example FM 7850 CC MB)
- Hamilton (for example H31)
- IWC Schaffhausen
- Selectus
- Jacques Etoile (cal. IV.C4)
- La Joux-Perret/Jacquet (for Jaquet Droz, Bremont BE-83, and others)
- Maurice Lacroix ML112
- Paul Picot ("Atelier Technikum")
- Panerai
- Porsche Design (Eterna 6036)
- Revue-Thommen ("Airspeed Flyback")
- Sellita SW500
- Sinn ("Flyback")
- Soprod
