= List of ETA Movements =

ETA SA is the largest consortium of Swiss watchmakers. It is a subsidiary of The Swatch Group. It sells millions of watch movements every year.

== Current mechanical movements ==
=== ETA Mechanical movements ===
ETA Mechanical movements
Caliber	Product Line	Winding	Diameter (mm)	Height (mm)	Jewels	Frequency		Running time (hours)
Caliber	Product Line	Winding	Diameter (mm)	Height (mm)	Jewels	VPH	Hz	Running time (hours)
2671	Mecaline	automatic	17.2	4.8	25	28800	4	38
2678	Mecaline	automatic	17.2	5.35	25	28800	4	38
2000-1	Mecaline Specialities	automatic	19.4	3.6	20	28800	4	40
2681	Mecaline	automatic	19.4	4.8	25	28800	4	38
2094	Mecaline Chronographes	automatic	23.3	5.5	33	28800	4	37
7001	Mecaline Specialities	hand	23.3	2.5	17	21600	3	42
2801-2	Mecaline	hand	25.6	3.35	17	28800	4	42
2804-2	Mecaline	hand	25.6	3.35	17	28800	4	42
2824-2	Mecaline	automatic	25.6	4.6	25	28800	4	38
2826-2	Mecaline	automatic	25.6	6.2	25	28800	4	38
2836-2	Mecaline	automatic	25.6	5.05	25	28800	4	38
2892-A2	Mecaline Specialities	automatic	25.6	3.6	21	28800	4	42
2893-1	Mecaline Specialities	automatic	25.6	4.1	21	28800	4	42
2893-2	Mecaline Specialities	automatic	25.6	4.1	21	28800	4	42
2893-3	Mecaline Specialities	automatic	25.6	4.1	21	28800	4	42
2895-2	Mecaline Specialities	automatic	25.6	4.35	27	28800	4	42
2896	Mecaline Specialities	automatic	25.6	4.85	22	28800	4	42
2897	Mecaline Specialities	automatic	25.6	4.85	21	28800	4	42
2894-2	Mecaline Chronographes	automatic	28	6.1	37	28800	4	42
2834-2	Mecaline	automatic	29	5.05	25	28800	4	38
7750	Mecaline Chronographes – Valjoux	automatic	30	7.9	25	28800	4	48
7751	Mecaline Chronographes – Valjoux	automatic	30	7.9	25	28800	4	48
7753	Mecaline Chronographes – Valjoux	automatic	30	7.9	27	28800	4	48
7754	Mecaline Chronographes – Valjoux	automatic	30	7.9	25	28800	4	48
6497-1	Mecaline – Unitas	hand	36.6	4.5	17	18000	2.5	46
6497-2	Mecaline Specialities – Unitas	hand	36.6	4.5	17	21600	3	56
6498-1	Mecaline – Unitas	hand	36.6	4.5	17	18000	2.5	46
6498-2	Mecaline Specialities – Unitas	hand	36.6	4.5	17	21600	3	56
A07.111	Mecaline Specialities – Valgranges	automatic	36.6	7.9	24	28800	4	48
A07.161	Mecaline Specialities – Valgranges	automatic	36.6	7.9	24	28800	4	48
A07.171	Mecaline Specialities – Valgranges	automatic	36.6	7.9	24	28800	4	48
A07.211	Mecaline Chronographes – Valgranges	automatic	36.6	7.9	25	28800	4	48

=== ETA Mechanical movement features ===
ETA Mechanical movement features
Caliber	Hours	Minutes	Seconds	Date	Day	Hacking seconds^{1}	Ball bearing	Regulator	Other features
2671	Yes	Yes	sweep second	Yes	No	Yes	Yes	ETACHRON	
2678	Yes	Yes	sweep second	Yes	Yes	Yes	Yes	ETACHRON	
2000-1	Yes	Yes	sweep second	Yes	No	Yes	Yes	ETACHRON	
2681	Yes	Yes	sweep second	Yes	No	Yes	Yes	ETACHRON	
2094	Yes	Yes	small second	Yes	No	Yes	Yes	ETACHRON	Chronograph mechanism with cams, 2 push buttons, chronograph 60 seconds, dragging counters 30 minutes and 12 hours
7001	Yes	Yes	small second	No	No	No	No	—	Ultra-flat calibre
2801-2	Yes	Yes	sweep second	No	No	Yes	No	ETACHRON	
2804-2	Yes	Yes	sweep second	Yes	No	Yes	No	ETACHRON	
2824-2	Yes	Yes	sweep second	Yes	No	Yes	Yes	ETACHRON	
2826-2	Yes	Yes	sweep second	semi-instantaneous	No	Yes	Yes	ETACHRON	Date display in big window
2836-2	Yes	Yes	sweep second	Yes	Yes	Yes	Yes	ETACHRON	
2892-A2	Yes	Yes	sweep second	Yes	No	Yes	Yes	ETACHRON	
2893-1	Yes	Yes	sweep second	instantaneous	No	Yes	Yes	ETACHRON	Universal hour indicator with disc
2893-2	Yes	Yes	sweep second	Yes	No	Yes	Yes	ETACHRON	24 hour hand or second time zone
2893-3	Yes	Yes	sweep second	No	No	Yes	Yes	ETACHRON	Universal hour indicator with disc
2895-2	Yes	Yes	small second	Yes	No	Yes	Yes	ETACHRON	
2896	Yes	Yes	sweep second	instantaneous	No	Yes	Yes	ETACHRON	Date display in big window, ETACHRON with finetiming device
2897	Yes	Yes	sweep second	Yes	No	Yes	Yes	ETACHRON	Power-reserve display
2894-2	Yes	Yes	small second	Yes	No	Yes	Yes	ETACHRON	Chronograph mechanism with cams, 2 push buttons, chronograph 60 seconds, dragging counters 30 minutes and 12 hours
2834-2	Yes	Yes	sweep second	Yes	Yes	Yes	Yes	ETACHRON	External day display
7750	Yes	Yes	small second	Yes	Yes	Yes	Yes	ETACHRON	Chronograph mechanism with cams, 2 push buttons, chronograph 60 seconds, 30 minutes and 12 hours counters
7751	Yes	Yes	small second	Yes	Yes	Yes	Yes	ETACHRON	Chronograph mechanism with cams, 2 push buttons, chronograph 60 seconds, 30 minutes and 12 hours counters, date indication by hand, day, month, and moon phases showing in dial apertures, quick correction of date, day, month, and moon phases, 24 hours hand
7753	Yes	Yes	small second	Yes	No	Yes	Yes	ETACHRON	Chronograph mechanism with cams, 3 push buttons, chronograph 60 seconds, 30 minutes and 12 hours counters, date in window, date correction by means of push button at 10 o’clock
7754	Yes	Yes	small second	Yes	No	Yes	Yes	ETACHRON	Chronograph mechanism with cams, 2 push buttons, chronograph 60 seconds, 30 minutes and 12 hours counters, date in window, 24 hour hand with second time mechanism
6497-1	Yes	Yes	small second	No	No	No	No	—	Lépine calibre
6497-2	Yes	Yes	small second	No	No	No	No	—	Lépine calibre
6498-1	Yes	Yes	small second	No	No	No	No	—	Hunter calibre
6498-2	Yes	Yes	small second	No	No	No	No	—	Hunter calibre
A07.111	Yes	Yes	second	Yes	No	No	No	ETACHRON	ETACHRON with finetiming device
A07.161	Yes	Yes	second	Yes	No	No	No	ETACHRON	Power-reserve display, ETACHRON with finetiming device
A07.171	Yes	Yes	second	Yes	No	No	No	ETACHRON	24 hour hand with second time mechanism, ETACHRON with finetiming device
A07.211	Yes	Yes	small second	Yes	No	Yes	Yes	ETACHRON	Chronograph mechanism with cams, 2 push buttons, chronograph 60 seconds, 30 minutes and 12 hours counters, date in window
^{1} Also called "stop second device" by ETA

== Discontinued mechanical movements ==
- 1120 (manual wind, sub-second, 15/17 jewels, 18000vph, reserve 42h)
- 2660 (manual wind, sweep-second, 17 jewels, 28800vph, reserve 45h)
- 7001 (manual wind, sub-second, 17 jewels, 21600vph, reserve 42h)
- 2850 (manual wind, sweep-second, 17 jewels, 28800vph, reserve 50h)
- 2512 (manual wind, 17/19 jewels, 21600vph, reserve 30h)
- 2452 (automatic wind, date, sweep-second, jewels, 18000vph, reserve 42h)
- 2750 (manual wind, sweep-second, 17 jewels, 21600vph, reserve 48h)
- 2890 (automatic, sweep-second, 21 jewels, 28800vph, reserve 42h)
- 2770 (automatic, sweep-second, 17/21/25 jewels, 21600vph, reserve 46h)
- 2450 (automatic, sweep-second, 17/21/25/30 jewels, 18000vph, reserve 42h)
- 2540 (manual wind, sweep-second, 17 jewels, 21600vph, reserve 44h)
- 2550 (automatic, sweep-second, 17/21/23 jewels, 21600vph, reserve 42h)
- 1080 (manual wind, sweep-second, 17/19/21 jewels, 18000vph, reserve 42h)

== See also ==
- ETA SA
