= Ebauches SA =

Swiss watch movement manufacturer

- Company type: Holding company
- Industry: Watchmaking
- Founded: 1926
- Successor: SMH (Swatch Group)
- Headquarters: Neuchâtel, Switzerland
- Products: Watch movements and components

Ebauches SA (ESA) was a Swiss holding company for the production of watch movements (ébauches) and parts, founded in Neuchâtel in 1926. The company played a central role in the Swiss watch industry cartel until its integration into what became the Swatch Group in the 1980s.

== History ==
=== Foundation and early years ===
Ebauches was founded in 1926 by three major Swiss watch component manufacturers: A. Schild SA (ASSA) in Granges, Fabrique d'horlogerie de Fontainemelon (FHF), and A. Michel SA (AMSA) in Granges. The company opposed the export of movement templates (chablons) to prevent the production of watches abroad under the Swiss label.

In 1931, Ebauches joined ASUAG, completing the Swiss watch cartel. Despite being part of the same holding company, the various subsidiaries, led by family dynasties, continued to compete fiercely with one another.

=== Expansion and dominance ===
By 1968–1969, Ebauches had grown to include twenty-three subsidiaries in Switzerland, three abroad, and employed 10,000 people. The subsidiary Ebauches Electroniques Marin (EEM) was founded in 1970, shortly before the collapse of the watch cartel, which had neglected the growing market for electronic watches.

In 1974, Ebauches dominated 25% of the global market for mechanical movements.

=== Restructuring and merger ===
Beginning in 1978, a significant wave of mergers took place among the holding's companies. In 1982, ETA SA took over operational management of Ebauches. In 1983, Asuag-Ebauches merged with SSIH to form Asuag-SSIH, which became the Société de Microélectronique et d'Horlogerie in 1985, then the Swatch Group in 1998.
