= ETA SA =

Swiss watch company

ETA SA Swiss Watch Manufacturer
- Native name: ETA SA Manufacture Horlogère Suisse
- Company type: Private (subsidiary of The Swatch Group Ltd.)
- Industry: Watch movement manufacturing; Ébauche manufacturing; Watch parts manufacturing
- Predecessor: Ebauches SA
- Founded: Grenchen, Switzerland 1856
- Founder: Urs Schild; Josef Girard
- Headquarters: Grenchen, Solothurn, Switzerland
- Key people: Damiano Casafina, CEO
- Products: ETA 2824-2 movement Valjoux 7750 movement and ETA 2892 movement Powermatic 80
- Parent: The Swatch Group Ltd.
- Website: eta.ch

ETA SA Manufacture Horlogère Suisse (ETA SA Swiss Watch Manufacturer) designs and manufactures quartz watches and both hand-wound and automatic-winding mechanical ébauches and movements. Commonly referred to as ETA, the company is headquartered in Grenchen, Switzerland, and is a wholly owned subsidiary of The Swatch Group.

Though ETA was founded by Eterna in 1856 some part of its production line can be traced back to the 1793 founding of Fabriques d’Horlogerie de Fontainemelon (FHF) by David Benguerel, Isaac Benguerel, François Humbert-Droz and Julien Humbert-Droz.

Through a series of mergers, ETA has become the largest manufacturer of Swiss watch movements and controls a virtual monopoly over their production and supply. ETA has undergone several Swiss government investigations due to its market position. To resolve the concerns of Swiss government regulators, ETA has entered into an agreement that governs certain business practices.

== Description ==
ETA designs and manufactures mechanical and automatic watches, watch movements and watch ébauches. Although the company produces finished watches and movements, ETA specializes in the production of ébauche movements used both in watches of sister Swatch Group subsidiary brands and in the watches of competitors including brands owned by Richemont, LVMH, and others. ETA maintains vertical control over the manufacturing of all of the components required to manufacture a watch movement with the exception of hairsprings which are manufactured by sister company Nivarox. ETA is considered a true manufacture d'horlogerie due to its vertical control over the components required to manufacture a watch movement.

== History ==
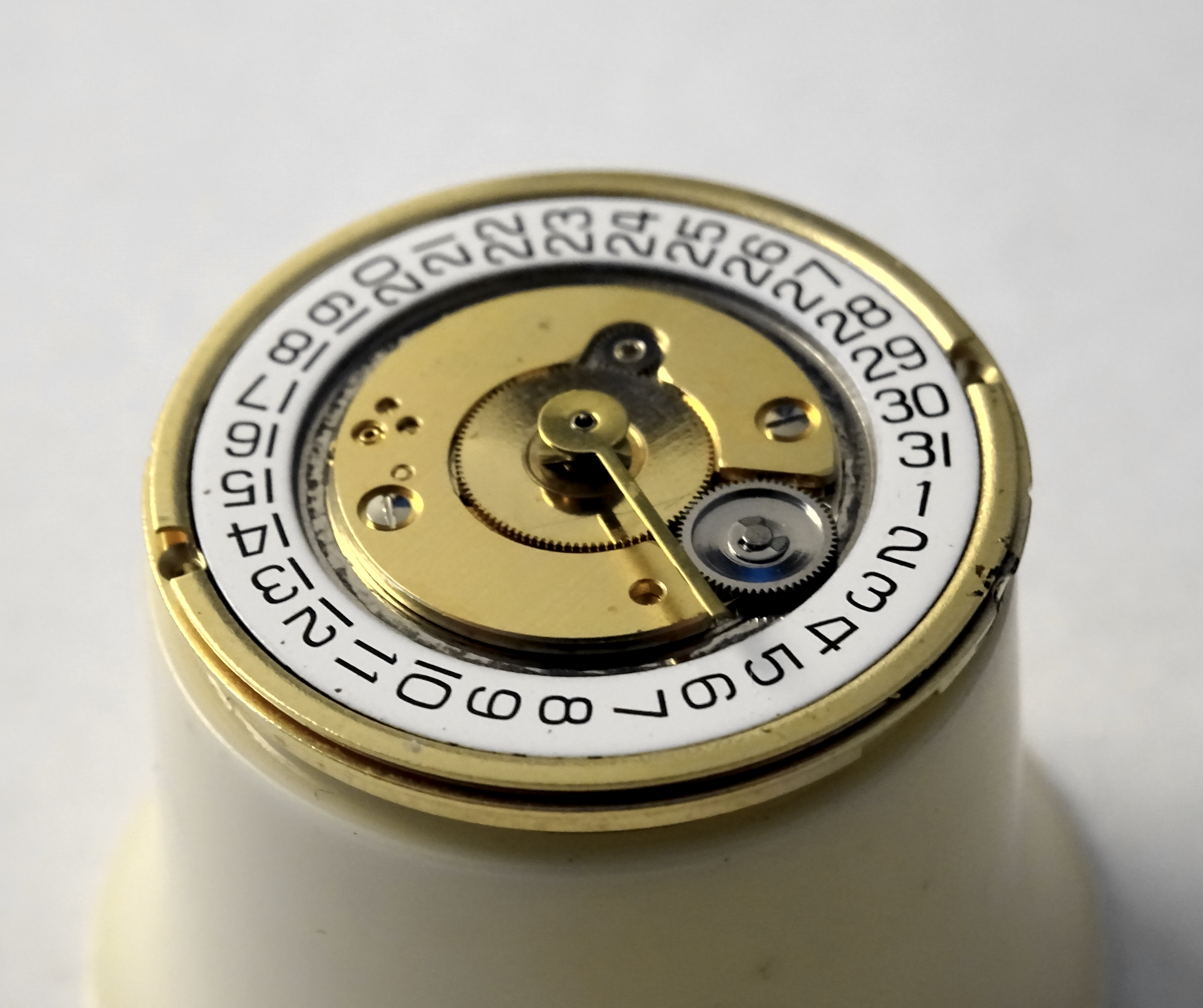
Electronic quartz movement by ETA.

ETA is the result of successive consolidation of the Swiss watch industry, a combination of several former Swiss watch movement manufacturers including Valjoux, Peseux and Lemania.

In 1856 at Grenchen, Urs Schild, a schoolmaster, and Dr. Josef Girard set up a watch movement (ébauche) factory which eventually became Eterna. In 1926, ETA AS (the movement branch of Eterna, founded in 1896) and FHF (founded in 1793) took part in the creation of Ébauches SA. In 1978 AS and ETA merged and in 1985 ETA took in all the activities done before by Ébauches SA and FHF (both part of SMH/Swatch Group).

SSIH was founded in 1930 through the amalgamation of Omega and Tissot. By consolidating companies that produced high-quality movements and a number of watch brands, SSIH gradually established a strong position in the Swiss watch industry.

At the time, both SSIH and ASUAG held a number of well-established Swiss watch brands. ASUAG had been founded in 1931. ASUAG expanded through the purchase of companies that made movement-blanks and a number of finished watch manufacturers that were subsequently brought together under the subsidiary General Watch Co (GWC).

In the 1930s, both ASUAG and SSIH entered into complementary research and development programs to combat a severe economic crisis. Following repeated crises in the Swiss watch industry, by the 1970s both ASUAG and SSIH were again in trouble. Foreign competition and the mass production of cheap new electronic products were taking over the market. Eventually, both ASUAG and SSIH faced bankruptcy.

Throughout the years of crisis and restructuring from 1978, Ernst Thomke was at the helm of ETA SA, and also had become CEO of Ebauches SA and appointed on the Board of Directors of ASUAG. He became SMH's first CEO, position he held until 1991. At that time, Nicolas G. Hayek, as newly elected chairman of the board and main shareholder had already become the only person of reference.

In 1998, Swiss Corporation for Microelectronics and Watchmaking Industries Ltd (Société de Microélectronique et d'Horlogerie or SMH), founded in 1983 through the merger Swiss watchmakers ASUAG and SSIH, was renamed the Swatch Group.

== Products ==
=== ETA 2824-2 ===
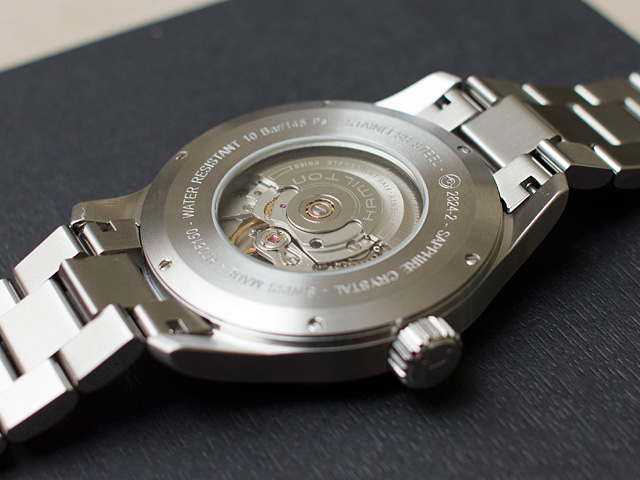
Hamilton Khaki Field Officer H70615133 with Swiss ETA 2824-2 movement

One workhorse of the ETA mechanical line is the ETA 2824–2, The 2824 is an automatic winding, twenty-five jewel movement, available in four executions or grades: Standard, Elaborated (improved), Top and Chronometer. The key components which differ at the line of demarcation between Elaborated and Top are the shock protection system (Elaborate=Etachoc/Top=Incabloc), balance wheel (Elaborate=Brass/Top=Glucydur) and the hairspring (Elaborate=Nivarox 2/Top=Anachron). In contrast, since the addition of the "-2" at the end of the movement number, there has been no difference between the standard and the chronometer grades in terms of the regulator mechanism, both being Etachron. To illustrate the differences in accuracy garnered by the successive grades, consider the following specifications:

- the Standard grade is adjusted in two positions with an average rate of ±12 seconds/day, with a maximum daily variation of ±30 seconds;
- the Elaborated grade is adjusted in three positions with an average rate of ±7 seconds/day, with a maximum daily variation of ±20 seconds;
- the Top grade is adjusted in five positions with an average rate of ±4 seconds/day, with a maximum daily variation of ±15 seconds.

The Chronometer grade must meet strict standards prescribed by the COSC. Chronometer grade movements are serial numbered, as that is a requirement of the certification authority. Moreover, the degree of decoration on the movement's parts, generally only an aesthetic improvement, increases as well with the grade.

=== ETA 2892-A2 ===
The ETA 2892-A2 is a newer design dating to the 1970s and fitted with top quality components.

An automatic winding, 21-jewel movement, the 2892 is available in three executions or grades: Elaborated, Top and Chronometer. The key components which differ at the line of demarcation between Elaborated and Top are the balance wheel (Elaborate=Brass/Top=Glucydur) and the hairspring (Elaborate=Nivarox 2/Top=Anachron). In contrast, since the addition of the "-2" at the end of the movement number, there has been no difference between the standard and the chronometer grades in terms of the regulator mechanism, both being Etachron. The degree of decoration on the movement's parts also increases with the grade. To illustrate the differences in accuracy garnered by the successive grades, consider the following specifications:

- Elaborated grade is adjusted in four positions with an average rate of ±5 seconds/day, with a maximum daily variation of ±20 seconds;
- Top grade is adjusted in five positions with an average rate of ±4 seconds/day, with a maximum daily variation of ±15 seconds.
- Chronometer an average rate of −4/+6 with a maximum daily variation of ±5 seconds - standards prescribed by the COSC. The wider range for the chronometer grade is designed to take into account the differences in a watch's rate between static positions, as when the tests are performed, and the dynamic positions as when a watch is actually worn. Chronometer grade movements are serial numbered.

The ETA 2892.A2 is usually found in the more expensive and prestigious watches and brands, and owing to its relatively slim height of 3.60 mm, the 2892.A2 is a favorite of watch brands that market complicated movements such as Breitling with its trademark chronograph (stop watches). The 2892 is also used in certain International Watch Company watches, including newer Ingenieur models introduced in 2013.

=== The Omega coaxial based upon an ETA movement ===
Omega's Seamaster line of watches (including the Seamaster Professional 300) previously used an embellished version of the ETA 2892.A2 known as the Omega 1120. Later versions of the Seamaster used a proprietary coaxial escapement invented by George Daniels, an English horologist, and exclusively marketed by Omega, a sister company of ETA. The movement with the coaxial escapement is known as the Omega 2500 series and is derived from the ETA 2892. Later versions of the Seamaster "Planet Ocean" migrated from the Omega 2500 to a different coaxial escapement known as the Omega 8500 series with extremely high magnetic resistance. Current Seamaster Professional 300 models continue to use the Omega 2500 "D" series movements..

=== ETA/Valjoux 7750 ===
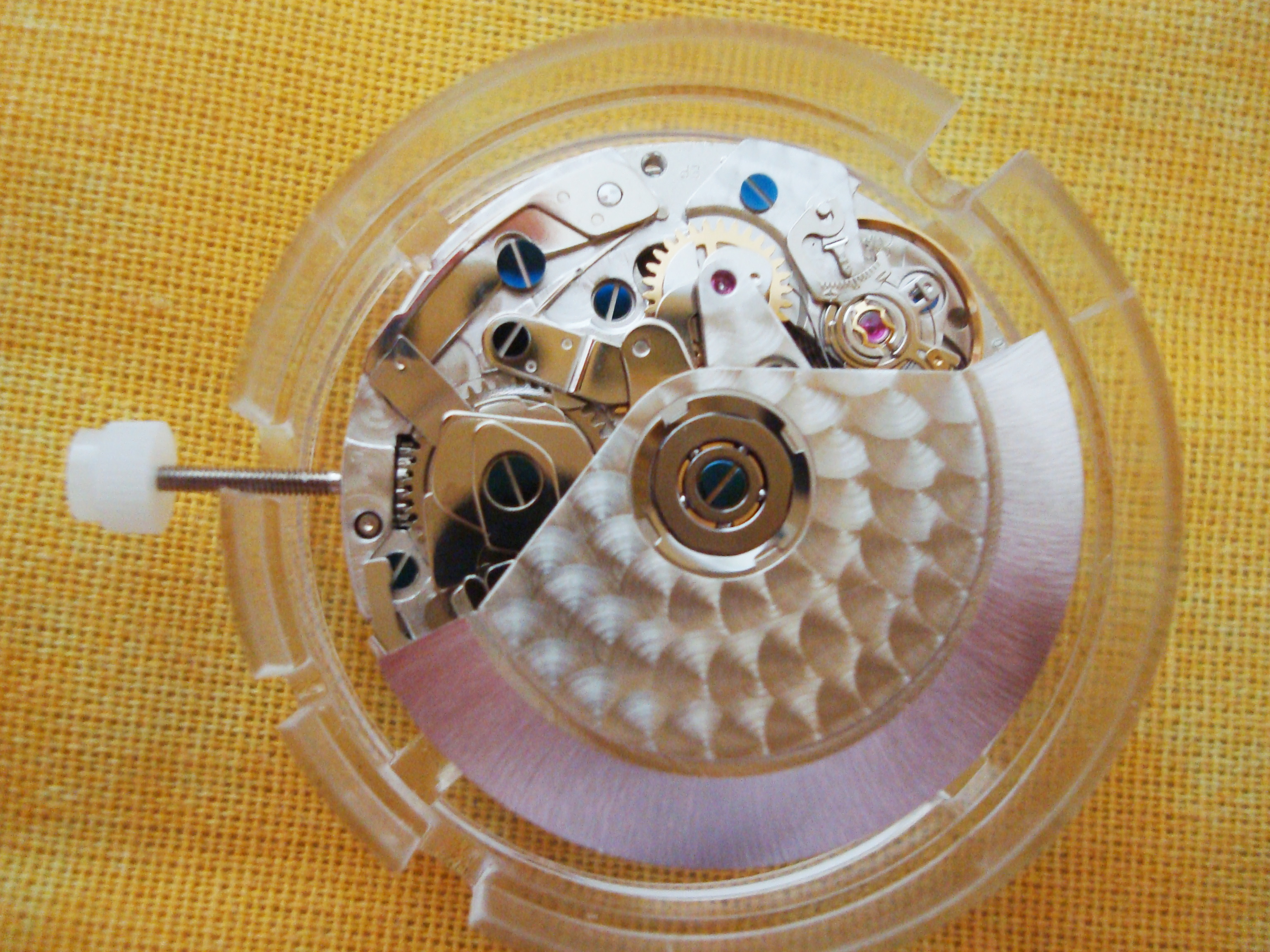
ETA/Valjoux 7750 automatic movement

The Valjoux 7750 a.k.a. ETA 7750 an extremely popular movement used in the majority of mechanical chronograph watches on the market in 2004.

The Valjoux 7750 uses a three-plane cam system, the coulisse-lever escapement, rather than the traditional chronograph mechanism, the column wheel. It is constructed of a mainplate, calendar plate, and chronograph top plate. Levers push a cam back and forth, driving the stopwatch mechanism of the Valjoux 7750. In the 1980s, many companies began using the Valjoux 7750 because it was easier to mass-produce and distribute in high-volume. The system and movement were developed by Edmond Capt in 1970, as a fully integrated self-winding mechanism with quick-set day/date based on the Valjoux 7733.

The movement is an automatic winding, 25-jewel movement that can be fitted with a variety of features including the triple date (day, date, month and moon phase) or a variety of two and three register models with totalizers or counters for minutes, seconds and hours. It is available in three executions or grades: Elaborated, Top and Chronometer. The key components which differ at the line of demarcation between Elaborated and Top are the pallet stones, balance wheel & hairspring and the regulator mechanism. To illustrate the differences in accuracy garnered by the successive grades, consider the following specifications:

- Elaborated grade is adjusted in three positions with an average rate of ±5 seconds/day with a maximum daily variation of ±15 seconds;
- Top grade is adjusted in five positions with an average rate of ±4 seconds/day with a maximum daily variation of ±15 seconds.
- Chronometer grade must meet strict standards prescribed by the COSC: an average rate of −4/+6 with a maximum daily variation of ±5 seconds.

Powermatic 80 movements

The Powermatic 80 is a movement designed and produced by ETA SA. The movements feature is to have 80 hours of power reserve, hence the name. This technology of movement was first announced at Baselworld in 2012. Today, the Powermatic 80 movement is mostly used by brands in the Swatch Group, like Tissot, Hamilton and Certina.

The accuracy of the movement is said to be -2 / +8 sec. per day.

== Anti-monopoly investigation ==
In 2003 the Swiss Competition Commission launched an investigation into the business practices of ETA SA after Nicolas Hayek, then chairman of ETA parent The Swatch Group Ltd., announced in 2002 that ETA would shortly stop supplying ébauches (partial watch movements) to companies outside The Swatch Group. Competitors complained that this would effectively put them out of business. Hayek countered that Swiss watch making companies must begin to invest in their own movement-making capabilities because it was detrimental to the long-term health of the Swiss watchmaking industry to rely on one supplier, ETA, for the bulk of ébauche and parts production. The Swiss Competition Commission ordered ETA to continue supplying ébauches to companies outside The Swatch Group during the investigation.

In 2005 the Swiss Competition Commission concluded its investigation and ordered ETA to continue delivering ébauches and parts at the then current levels until 2008, after which ETA was allowed to gradually reduce deliveries until 2010. The commission had found that for ébauches priced up to US$250, there were no real alternatives and ETA's decision to stop deliveries was a breach of Swiss law pertaining to cartels.

Although the 2005 decision has spurred some watchmakers to invest in the personnel and equipment necessary to produce movements in-house, heavy reliance on ETA continued. The original finding has been extended, with the Swiss Competition Commission ordering in July 2012 that based on 2010 supply levels, ETA may reduce the level of supplied movements by 30 per cent in 2014–2015, 50 per cent in 2016-2017 and by 70 per cent by 2018–2019. The number of Nivarox products that must be offered will be reduced gradually, dropping by 70 per cent by 2023. ETA hopes to eventually reach a market position where they are allowed to freely choose to supply or not to supply parts and ébauches to competitors based solely on ETA's discretion.

== Similar movements by other manufacturers ==
Since the expiration of the relevant mechanical movement patents, (very) similar movements are produced by other manufacturers as alternatives for obtaining original ETA ébauches and parts. These movements are often referred to as "ETA clones", though parts exchangeability with original ETA movements cannot be assumed. The clone movement designs are based on the original ETA designs and can feature technical modifications. ETA clone movements are produced in Switzerland by competing companies like Sellita, as well as in other countries like by Tianjin Seagull, and are sometimes available in various execution grades up to COSC Chronometer certified.

== See also ==
- List of ETA Movements
