= Sellita =

Swiss manufacturer of mechanical watches

Sellita Watch Co. SA
- Industry: Watch movement manufacturing
- Founded: 1950
- Headquarters: La Chaux-de-Fonds, Neuchâtel, Switzerland
- Website: sellita.ch

Sellita (Sellita Watch Co. SA) is a Swiss manufacturer of mechanical watch movements based in La Chaux-de-Fonds in the canton of Neuchâtel. Founded in 1950, Sellita was one of ETA's major outsourced assembly partners for their movements until 2003.

After 2003, Sellita developed its own movements based on ETA movements with expired patent rights and has become one of the main movement manufacturers of the Swiss watchmaking industry.

== Movements ==
Hublot, IWC, Lilienthal Berlin, Eberhard & Co,Oris, Raymond Weil, Sinn, TAG Heuer, Marathon, and Christopher Ward are among the brands that use Sellita's movements or slightly modified versions to power their watches.

- SW200/215/400 (based on ETA 2824-2 and ETA 2836-2)
- SW300/1000 (based on ETA 2892-2)
- SW500/510/600 (based on Valjoux 7750 a.k.a. ETA 7750)

=== Movement grades ===
Like the ETA movements, there are four grades of Sellita SW series movements available:

- Standard – adjusted in two positions; average accuracy of +/-12 sec/day up to +/- 30 sec/day
- Special (Elabore) – adjusted in three positions; average accuracy of +/-7 sec/day up to +/- 20 sec/day
- Premium (Top) – adjusted in five positions;average accuracy of +/-4 sec/day up to +/- 15 sec/day
- Chronometer – COSC-certified Chronometer, meaning it meets the strict accuracy standards set by the Official Swiss Chronometer Testing Institute (COSC).

The movement grade determines the finish, the positions the movement was adjusted in at the factory, the expected average accuracy, used anti-shock system, and the material/finish used for the balance wheel.
