= Renata (battery) =

Swiss battery manufacturing company

- Industry: battery manufacturing
- Founded: 1952
- Headquarters: Itingen (Basel-Landschaft), Switzerland
- Key people: Stefan Pfrommer (CEO)
- Products: batteries

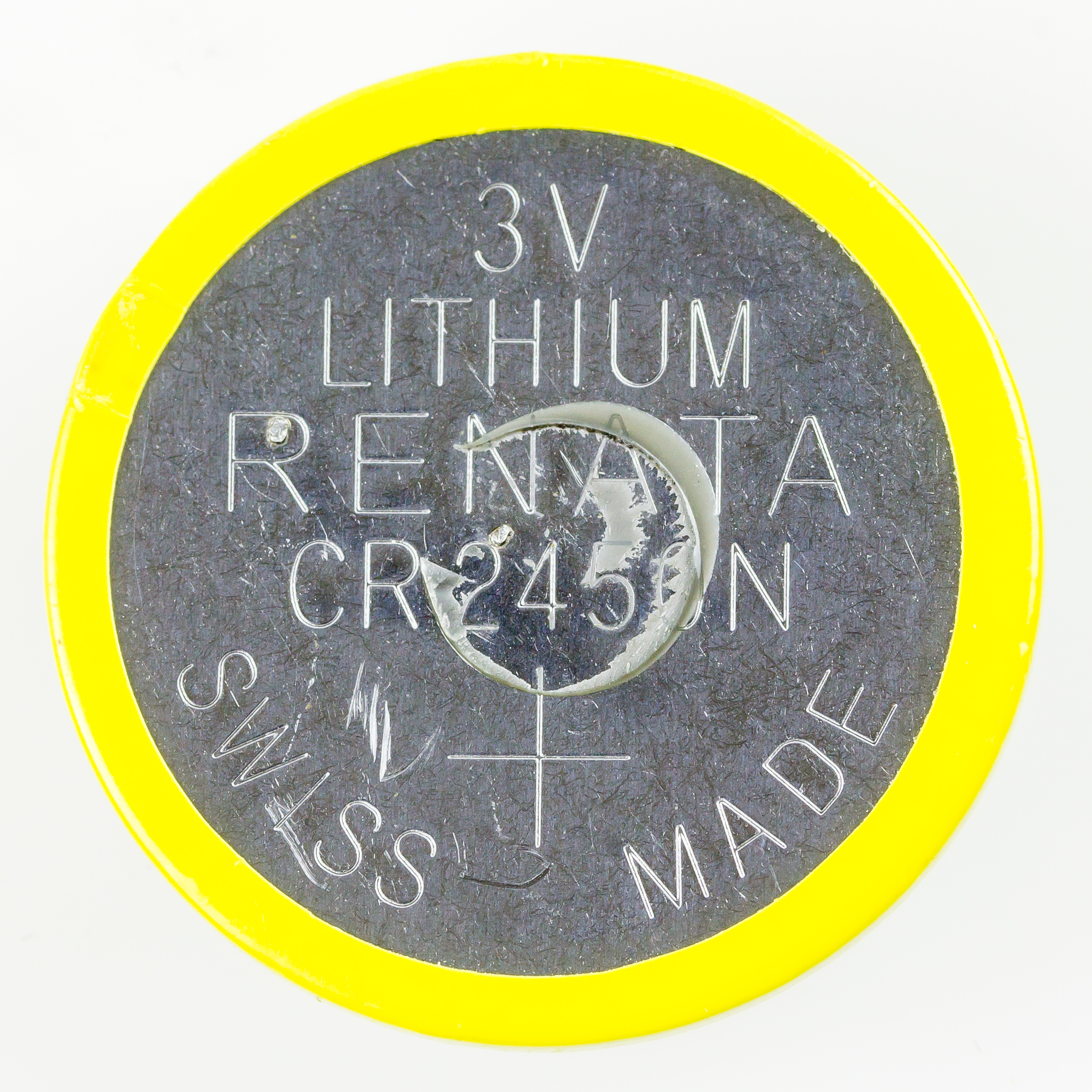
Coin cell CR2450

Renata AG SA (Renata Batteries), based in Itingen, Switzerland, is a developer and manufacturer of batteries (particularly coin or button cells). It is a subsidiary of The Swatch Group.

== Technology ==
Battery technologies offered by Renata comprise silver oxide (for wristwatches, calculators and small electronic toys, etc.), zinc air (for hearing aids), lithium (non-rechargeable, primary (for computer battery backup, etc.)) and battery holders, as well as industrial-use lithium polymer (rechargeable, secondary).

== History ==
Renata was founded in 1952 by Kurt Zehntner, as a manufacturer of components for mechanical watches, and diversified into production of coin or button cells in 1974. Renata was acquired by SMH Swiss Corporation for Microelectronics and Watchmaking Industries Ltd in 1982 (in 1998, SMH became known as The Swatch Group) and produces cells, batteries and associated encapsulation technologies and cell/battery holders.
