= Metalor Technologies =

Supplier of precious metals products and alloys

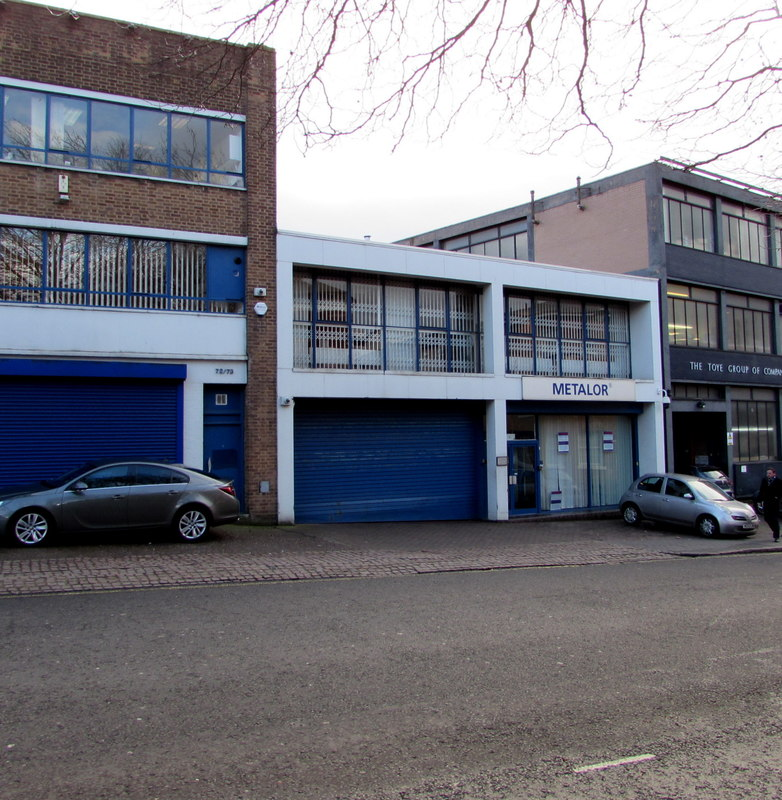
- Metalor office in the Jewellery Quarter, Birmingham, UK
- Formerly: Métaux Précieux SA Metalor
- Company type: Private
- Industry: Metals
- Founded: Le Locle, Switzerland (1852)
- Founder: Martin de Pury & Cie
- Headquarters: Neuchâtel, Switzerland
- Key people: Nicolas Carrea (CEO)
- Parent: Tanaka Kikinzoku Group
- Website: metalor.com

Metalor Technologies, previously Métaux Précieux SA Metalor, is a subsidiary of Japan-based Tanaka Kikinzoku Group. Founded in 1852, Metalor has become one of the major world suppliers of precious metals related products & procedures. It makes a wide array of alloys, especially for the watch and jewellery industry, supplying many of the Swiss watch brands, although it has expanded its activities far beyond its primary sector.

== History ==
The roots of the company go back to the "preparatory rolling mill" founded in 1852 by Martin de Pury & Cie in Le Locle. This specialized in smelting gold and manufacturing watch cases. In 1864, the plant, which had five employees at the time, was taken over by the Banque du Locle.

In 1918 the company became the property of the Swiss Bank Corporation (SBC).Operations have expanded to refining precious metals and producing bullion. In 1936, the bank association founded Métaux Précieux S.A. Metalor in Le Locle. As a result, production activities were initially expanded at the Neuchâtel site and later in other countries.

The group’s Hong Kong refinery opened in 1982, and Metalor began running its US refinery in 1986. In 1998, SBC merged with Union Bank of Switzerland (UBS) and a majority of the shares of Métaux Précieux SA Metalor were acquired from SBC by a group of Swiss private investors including Ernst Thomke, Martin Bisang, Rolf Soiron and Giorgio Behr. The refinery group changed name from “Métaux Précieux SA Metalor” to “Metalor Technologies” in 2001.

In 2013, the company selected Singapore as the location for a new gold refinery and manufacturing facility for bullion products. This decision was made to cater to the growing regional gold demand, which aligns with the Singapore government's initiatives to position the country as a prominent global trading hub for physical precious metal transactions. The Singapore refinery was opened in June 2014.

In September 2016, 100% of Metalor was sold to Tanaka Kikinzoku, a Japanese group of precious metals producers Tanaka Kikinzoku. Previously, the French investor Astorg Partners, who took over Metalor in 2009, held a majority of 50.5% of the shares.

== Metalor Dental ==
Metalor Dental has not been integrated into the Metalor Group; as of 1 January 2009, it has been merged into Cendres & Métaux, Biel/Bienne, Switzerland.
