= Mido (watch) =

Swiss watch manufacturer

Mido SA
- Type: Member of the Swatch group
- Industry: Watchmaking
- Founded: 1918 by George G. Schaeren
- Headquarters: Le Locle, Switzerland
- Area served: Worldwide
- Key people: Franz Linder, President
- Products: Wristwatches
- Parent: The Swatch Group
- Website: midowatches.com

Mido SA is a manufacturer of Swiss luxury watches. The company was founded in 1918 and is under the Swatch group brand umbrella.

== History ==
Mido was founded in 1918 by George (or Georges) G. Schaeren in Biel/Bienne, Switzerland. Mido comes from the Spanish phrase Yo mido meaning "I measure". In the 1920s, Mido introduced ladies' watches with color-enameled shaped cases and modern straps as well as timepieces for gentlemen in art deco style. Mido found a market in the flourishing automotive market by producing watches in the shape of radiator grills of a wide range of brands such as Buick, Bugatti, Fiat, Ford, Excelsior, Hispano-Suiza, etc.

In 1934, Mido launched the Multifort design, the first Mido to use a self-winding automatic movement. It was shock-resistant, anti-magnetic and water-resistant. During this time period, Mido used a Robot as its ambassador as a symbol of progress and robustness. A comic strip from this era featured the Mido Robot and its adventures.

In 1945, Mido became the first manufacturer to introduce a central-read chronograph. In 1954 the firm launched a new winding mechanism.

In 1954, Mido released the Powerwind collection, which included highly accurate watches with self-winding movements.

Mido released its Commander model in 1959, which utilized a one-piece case design. In 1967 Mido was distinguished as the maker of the world's thinnest ladies watch.

In 1970 Mido named the Aquadura Crown Sealing system, which makes use of an all-natural cork which is handled and formed to insure its water resistant qualities. This technique is utilized to seal the crown, the most susceptible place on a watch to water leakage.

In 1971, Mido joined ASUAG via the General Watch Co.

During the nineties, the Mido World Timer was launched. This was a practical display that can show the local time anywhere on the planet. The user must bring the desired city to the 12 o’clock position and press the crown to check the local time.

Today, Mido is a part of the Swatch Group, headquartered in Le Locle, Switzerland. It also has a branch office in Shanghai, China. In 2018, the brand celebrated its 100th anniversary.

== Market ==
Mido is recognized as one of the top 10 producers of certified chronometers. With 61,358 automatic movements produced in 2013, Mido is currently ranked number four in the production of chronometers in the Swiss watch industry.

The brand's primary markets are Latin America and Asia. Female customers account for approximately 40% of their sales. Mido CEO, Franz Linder, reported that 70-75% of automatic watches sold under $1,000 are from the brand
