= Ernst Thomke =

Swiss physician and watchmaker

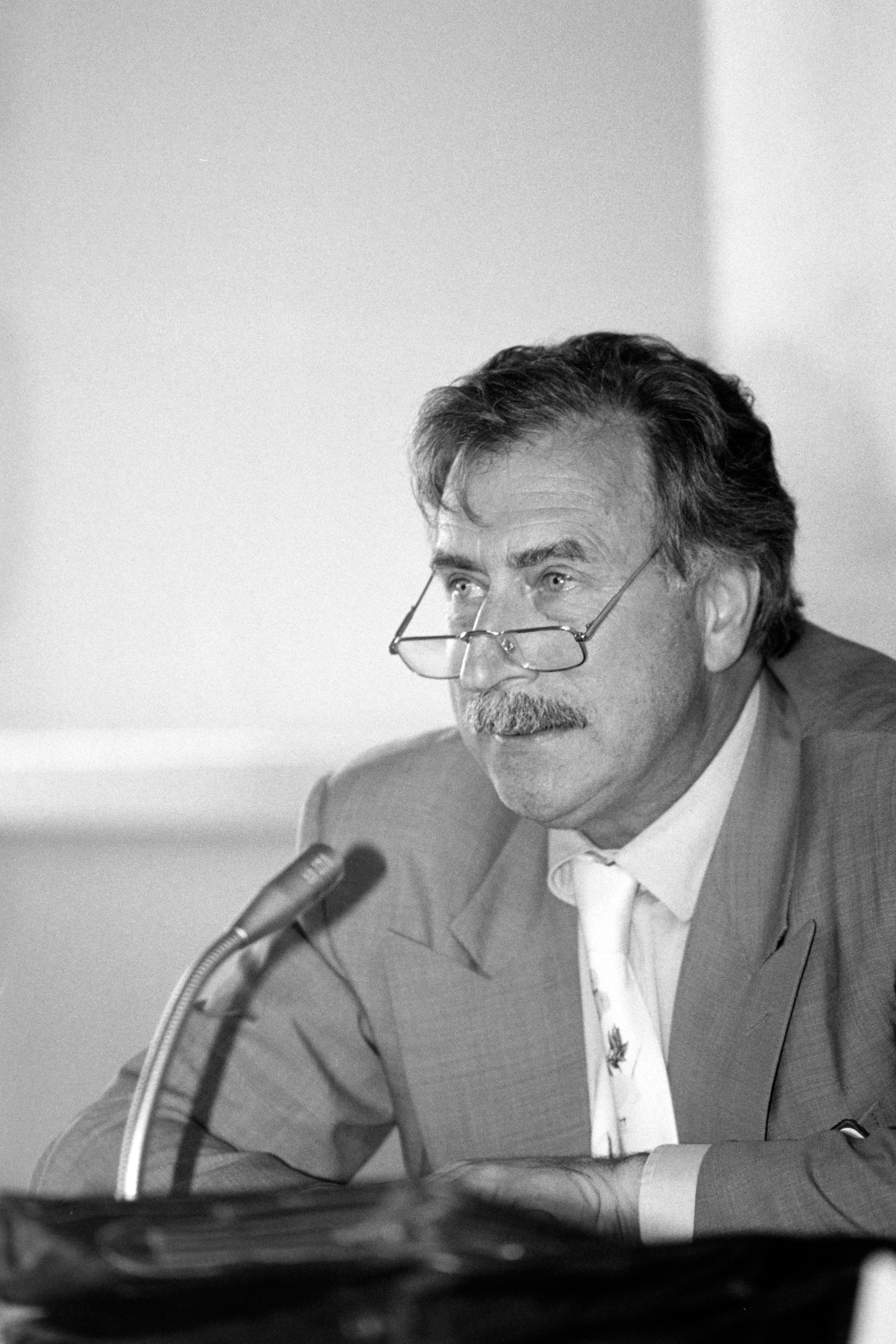
Ernst Thomke in 1994

Ernst Thomke (born 21 April 1939) is a Swiss physicist and watchmaker. Training first as a mechanic, he later acquired the Swiss federal maturity degree and pursued academic studies whilst in employment.

== Early life and education ==
Thomke was born in Biel/Bienne in the canton of Bern, on the Franco-German linguistic border. He completed an apprenticeship as a mechanic at the factory of ETA SA in Grenchen, canton of Solothurn. Between 1961 and 1967, he studied natural sciences, mainly chemistry at the University of Bern and University of Lausanne. He then pursued medical studies in Bern while working full-time. He was promoted to doctor in 1975. He completed his education with management studies and marketing at the INSEAD, Fontainebleau.

He worked in research from 1970 to 1977 for the British pharmaceutical group Beecham, mainly at their Swiss laboratories, but also at the pharmacological institute of Gothenburg, Sweden. He was appointed head of marketing and regional marketing director in the group's Europe division.

== Business career ==
In 1978, at the peak of the Swiss watch industry crisis, facing competition from Japanese watches, mainly those with Quartz, Thomke became head of ETA SA. He argued that consolidating small companies could save the Swiss watch industry, by ending internal competition between Swiss Ebauches manufacturers.

1978, ETA SA merged with its former rival A. Schild SA. The new ETA, with 2,200 employees, gradually introduced more advanced technology in the manufacturing of quartz movements and full automation throughout its production. Thomke integrated the administrative and production areas of the other factories previously owned by Ebauches SA. In 1982 he became CEO of Ebauches SA and was appointed to the Board of Directors of ASUAG, the holding company of ETA SA.

On the advice of freelance consultant Nicolas G. Hayek, watch groups ASUAG and SSIH merged between 1983 and 1984 into the Société de Microélectronique et d'Horlogerie (SMH), since renamed Swatch Group. Thomke was the new company's first CEO, from 1984 to 1991. In this period, the company integrated all of the Ebauches factories into ETA SA, and regained the brands Omega, Longines and Tissot. The Microméchanique acquired the necessary technology for the manufacture of integrated circuits and chips. In 1989, the consolidated turnover of SMH was CHF 2.1 billion. Thomke left in 1991.

== Later career ==
Between 1992 and 1995, Thomke was CEO of Motor-Columbus AG, refocusing its activity on the primary energy sector under the new name of ATEL, with a mandate from the majority shareholder, the Union Bank of Switzerland (now known as UBS).

In addition he worked until 1997 for the Oerlikon-Bührle Holding Company (OBH), as chairman and CEO between 1991 and 1997 of both Pilatus AG-Flugzeugwerke and Bally International AG. However, after an effective restructuring and streamlining of the latter company, plans to bring it to the Stock Exchange were rejected by the holding company. This decision led Thomke to withdraw from any activities within either company.

In 1995, Thomke became chairman of the board at Saurer AG in Arbon. He led Saurer AG until 1996, then became chairman of the board until 1999.

He also became an investor in medical technology company BB Biotech, as well as the main shareholder in watchmakers Métaux Précieux SA Métalor and British Masters S]. He has been chairman of the board at BB Biotech AG since 1993, Métaux Précieux SA Métalor since 1998, BB Medtech AG since 2000, Nobel Biocare since 2001, and Stiftungsrat, Institut für experimentelle Krebsforschung since 1995.

== Sources and references ==
- The Outsiders who saved the Swiss Watch Industry:
- Ernest Thomke: "Father of Swatch"
- "Um Ernst Thomke und Elmar Mock legt Hayek eine grosse Wolke": Macht und Sensibilität: Nicolas G. Hayek
- Thomke: Swatch a Successful Strategy
- Managers and leaders: Are they different?: see Ref. to Ernst Thomke & Nicolas Hayek "Ernst Thomke created the organisation that led to the emergence of the innovative Swatch; subsequent CEO Nicolas Hayek took the invention and relentlessly managed the organisation into a long streak of dominance and profitability".
- Thomke, Ernst, Short Biography
- Ernst Thomke: Chairman BB MEDTECH AG, etc.
- Thomke, Ernst: Nobel Biocare Holding AG, etc.
- The Swatch Phenomenon Series of articles retracing Swatch's history
