= Ébauche =

Outline or sketch or a watch subassembly

An ébauche is a blank, outline or sketch. In arts, it is a preliminary underpainting or quick sketch in oils for an oil painting. In horology, clockmaking and watchmaking, it is an incomplete or unassembled watch movement and its associated components.

The word is borrowed from French and is regularly used by English-speaking artists art historians, horologists, and timepiece hobbyists.

== Art ==
One early criticism of Impressionist painting was that its practitioners sought to elevate the status of the ébauche to the level of finished painting.

== Horology ==
Until about 1850, the watchmaker’s ébauche consisted of two plates with pillars and bars, the barrel, fusée, index, pawl and ratchet-wheel, along with a few assembling screws. These parts were all roughly filed and milled. The steel and brass were manufactured in a special workshop. The ébauche was finished by watchmakers in a finishing shop. The assortiment (literally "assortment" in English) are the parts of a watch other than the ébauche, in particular the regulating organs and include the balance, hairspring or spiral, escape wheel, anchor lever and pallet stones or jewels. The modern ébauche is a jewelled watch movement, without its regulating organs, mainspring, dial, or hands.

During the Industrial Revolution, new components were introduced by the Waltham Watch Company and the development of the American System of Watch Manufacturing, establishing the base of modern watch manufacture. Historic producers of ébauche movements have included companies such as A. Schild, Peseux, Fabrique d'Horlogerie de Fontainemelon (FHF), Gallet & Cie Fabrique d’horlogerie Electa, Landeron, Valjoux, Venus, France Ébauches and Lemania. Many of these producers have gone out of business over the past few decades, succumbing to the Quartz Revolution. Most were unable to compete with the inexpensive quartz electronic movements produced by Asian manufacturers, which flooded the market during the 1980s. The remaining ébauche producers today are almost all owned by ETA, a subsidiary of the Swatch Group.
