= Société de Microélectronique et d'Horlogerie =

Société de microélectronique et d'horlogerie was the name of the holding company created by the merger enforced by the Swiss Banks in 1983 of the SSIH and ASUAG, renamed The Swatch Group in 1998.

Ernst Thomke, previously CEO of Ebauches SA and ETA SA, was appointed to head the newly established conglomerate as its first CEO. He held his position until 1991. When he resigned, the newly elected President of the Board, Nicolas G. Hayek, had already managed to become the only person of reference.

== History ==
Between 1981 and 1983, Swiss banks injected more than 900 million Swiss francs into the groups SSIH and ASUAG in order to cope with the quartz crisis caused by competition from Japanese watch manufacturers. At the same time, in 1982, under the direction of Ernst Thomke, the company ETA of Grenchen had developed the Swatch, an inexpensive quartz watch with a plastic case designed to relaunch the Swiss watch industry. However, the banks requested a solvency audit of the sector from the Zurich-based consultancy of Nicolas Hayek.

The resulting report recommended the merger of the two major Swiss watchmaking groups to address their financial difficulties. The former CEO of Ébauches SA and ETA SA, Ernst Thomke, became the first chief executive officer of the newly created industrial conglomerate. The report also proposed launching a cheap plastic quartz watch, allowing ETA in Grenchen to develop the necessary product in 1983. Shortly afterwards, in 1985, Nicolas Hayek and a group of investors purchased 51% of the share capital of the SSIH-ASUAG group for the relatively modest sum of 153 million Swiss francs.

In 1991, with the support of the banks, Nicolas Hayek replaced Ernst Thomke as head of the group, which was renamed "Société suisse de microélectronique et d'horlogerie SA" (SMH), marking the end of the independence of several historic watch brands. However, this forced grouping of brands into SMH also represented in practice a rescue operation, enabling some of them to later prosper as part of the Swatch Group.
