= Allgemeine Gesellschaft der Schweizerischen Uhrenindustrie =

Watch manufacturing company

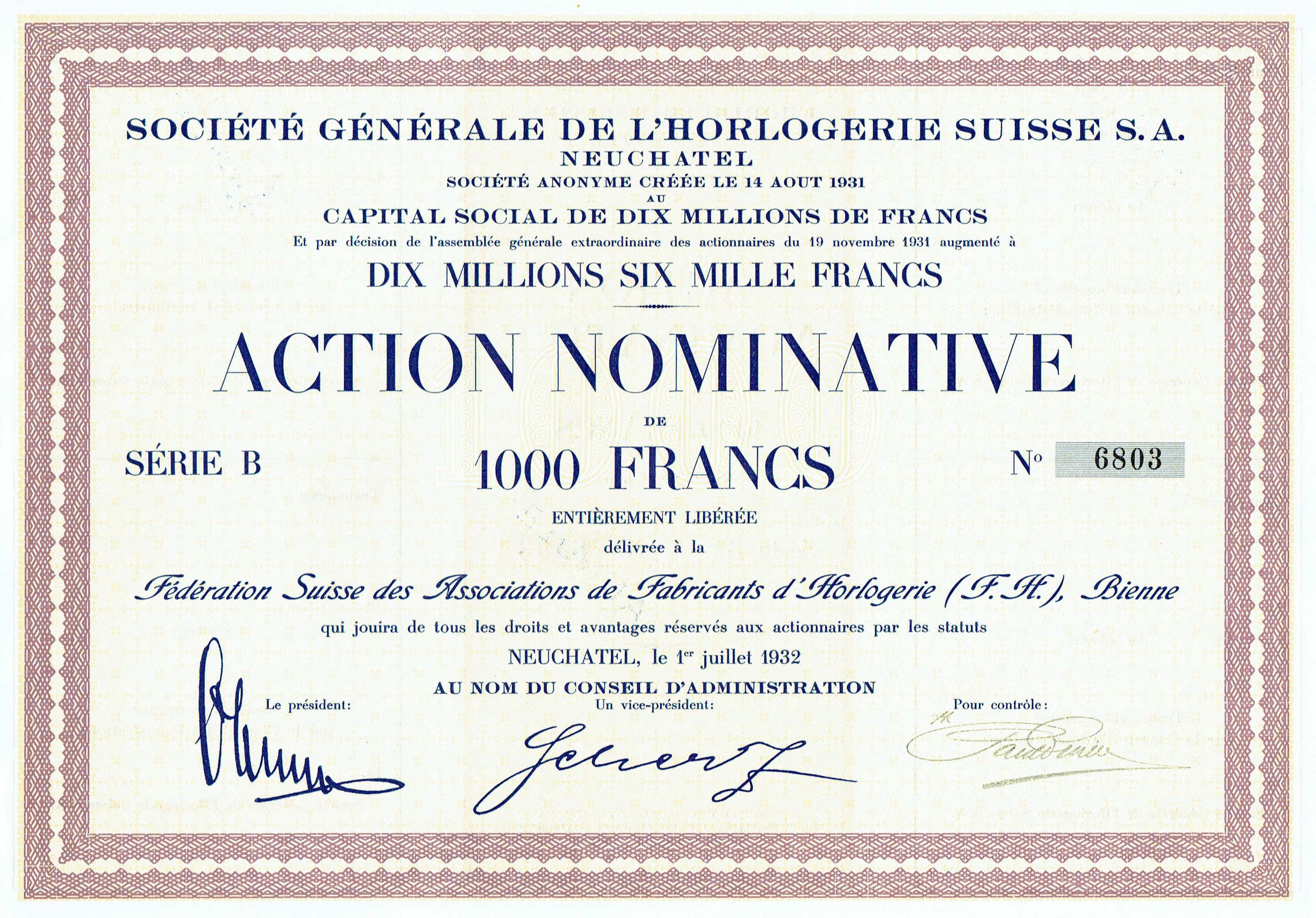
Share of the Soc. Générale de l'Horlogerie Suisse SA, issued 1. July 1932

Allgemeine Schweizerische Uhrenindustrie AG (ASUAG; French: Société Générale de l'Horlogerie Suisse SA) was the former biggest Swiss Watch Industry Group that had been created with the assistance of the Swiss government and the Swiss banks, as an answer to the crisis caused by the Great Depression, in 1931.

In 1983, ASUAG and SSIH were forced by the Swiss Banks to merge into Société de Microélectronique et d'Horlogerie (SMH), which now has been renamed Swatch Group. ASUAG grouped most of the movement parts & Ebauches manufacturers on one side, and through its sub-holding General Watch Co (GWC); many watch brands on the other side. Most of those companies are still active, integrated into the new conglomerate.

During the years of crisis, from 1978 until 1991, Dr. Ernst Thomke was at the helm of the restructuring, first as CEO of ETA SA, then Ebauches SA, including a mandate as Administrator of ASUAG, and became SMH's first CEO in 1983, a position that he held until 1991. At that time, newly elected president and main shareholder Nicolas G. Hayek had already become the only person of reference.
