= Eterna =

Swiss luxury watch company

Eterna AG Uhrenfabrik
- Industry: Watch manufacturing
- Founded: 1856 by Josef Girard and Urs Schild
- Headquarters: Grenchen, Switzerland
- Website: www.eterna.ch

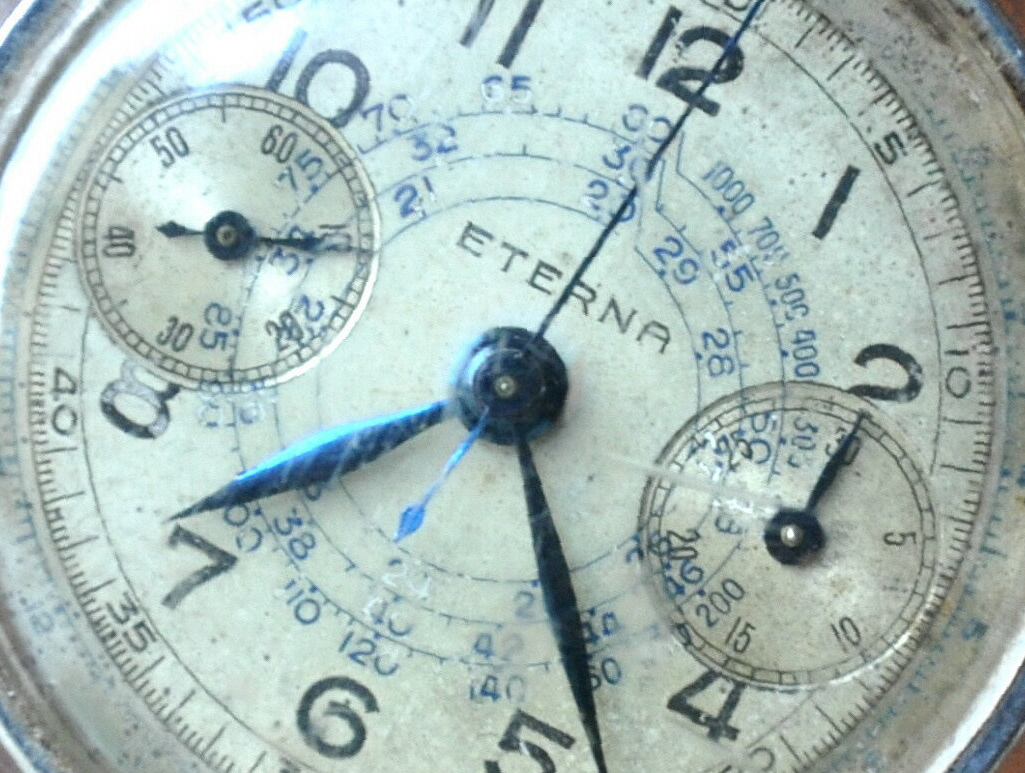
Eterna, detail

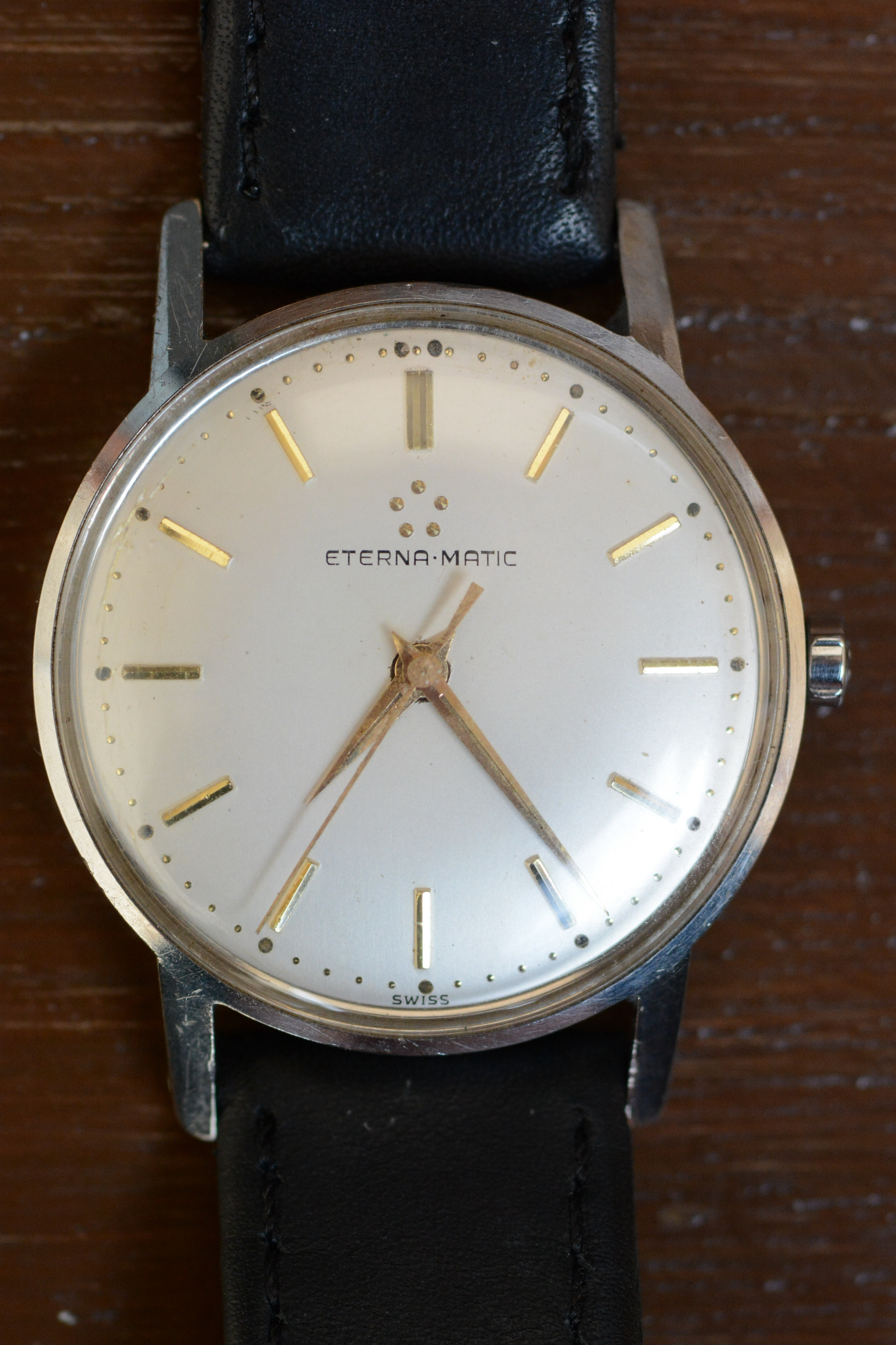
Eterna-Matic, Cal. 1414U, 1958

Eterna is a Swiss watch company founded in Grenchen, Canton Solothurn, on 7 November 1856 by Josef Girard and Urs Schild. The company is now owned by Hong Kong–based Citychamp Watch & Jewellery Group Limited, an investment holding company formerly known as China Haidian Holdings.

== History ==
In 1948 Eterna adopted the image of five balls as its corporate logo.

The Golden Heart for Ladies watch model, powered by Eterna-matic, was worn by actresses Gina Lollobrigida and Brigitte Bardot.

In 1958, the KonTiki watch collection was released. It was inspired by 1947 Thor Heyerdahl's Kon-Tiki expedition.

After 1982, Eterna was sold several times. By 1995, it was owned by FAP Beteiligungs GmbH. In 1999, Eterna produced a range of watches marketed under the Porsche Design label. Porsche Design sold Eterna to International Volant Ltd, a subsidiary of China Haidian on 29 June 2011. CEO Patrick Kury left the company in April 2013. China Haidian was renamed in 2014 to Citychamp Watch & Jewellery Group Limited. According to the Dutch OSINT platform Datenna, Citychamp Watch & Jewellery Group Limited's stake in Eterna led to a low risk of state influence on Eterna by the Chinese government.

In the 2000s Eterna resumed manufacturing watches and creating the Calibre 6036 in 2004. The ultra-thin automatic 3030 was produced for the 150th anniversary in 2006. In 2009, a half-century after the Eterna-Matic, the "Spherodrive" once again highlighted the significance of tiny ball-bearings in mechanical watchmaking. The company remains active in wristwatch design.

In 2014, it was announced that the partnership with Porsche Design would end and therefore end the production of Porsche branded watches, a partnership they started back in 1998.

In 2016, the company celebrated its 160th anniversary with the release of its limited edition Skeleton 1856 watch. The watch was available with straps in 3 different colours and only 160 of each was released.

== Milestones ==
- The 1870s: The first watch built entirely in-house
- 1908: Patent filed for the world’s first wrist alarm clock
- 1910: "Grand Prix" honors at the Brussels World Exhibition
- 1914: The first serially-produced wrist alarm clock is introduced
- 1930: Designs of the smallest production wristwatch with a "baguette" movement
- 1948: Birth of the friction-reducing ball-bearing mounted rotor system and production of the Eterna-Matic
- The 1950s: Actresses including Gina Lollobrigida and Brigitte Bardot wear the "Golden Heart"
- 1956: The 100th anniversary "Centenaire" automatic.
- 1958: The "Kon-Tiki", a tribute to the expedition of the Norwegian explorer Thor Heyerdahl in 1947
- 1962: The thinnest men's watch with an automatic movement and a date window, the "Eterna-Matic 3000 Dato" with a movement height of 3.6 mm.
- The 1980s: The "Museum" line breaks the thinness record in all categories. The quartz wristwatch has a thickness of only 0.98 mm.
- 1980: Eterna receives the "Grand Prix Triomphe de l'Excellence Européenne".
- 1995: Eterna was purchased by F.A. Porsche Beteiligungen GmbH.
- 2006: For the company's 150th anniversary the automatic calibre 3030 is released.
- 2011: Eterna was purchased by Citychamp Watch & Jewellery Group Limited.
- 2016: For the company's 160th anniversary the Skeleton 1856 is released

== Gallery ==
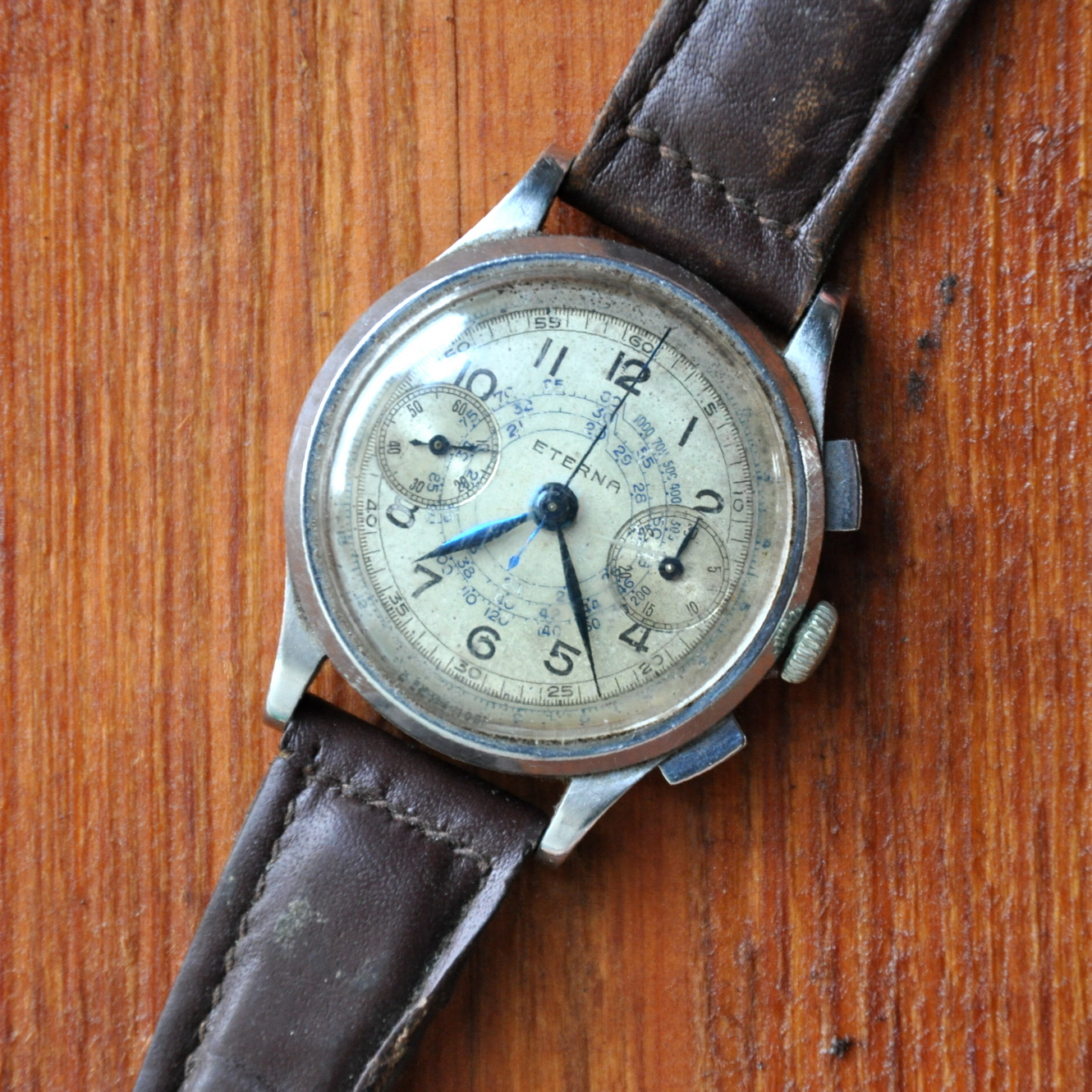
Eterna, 1925

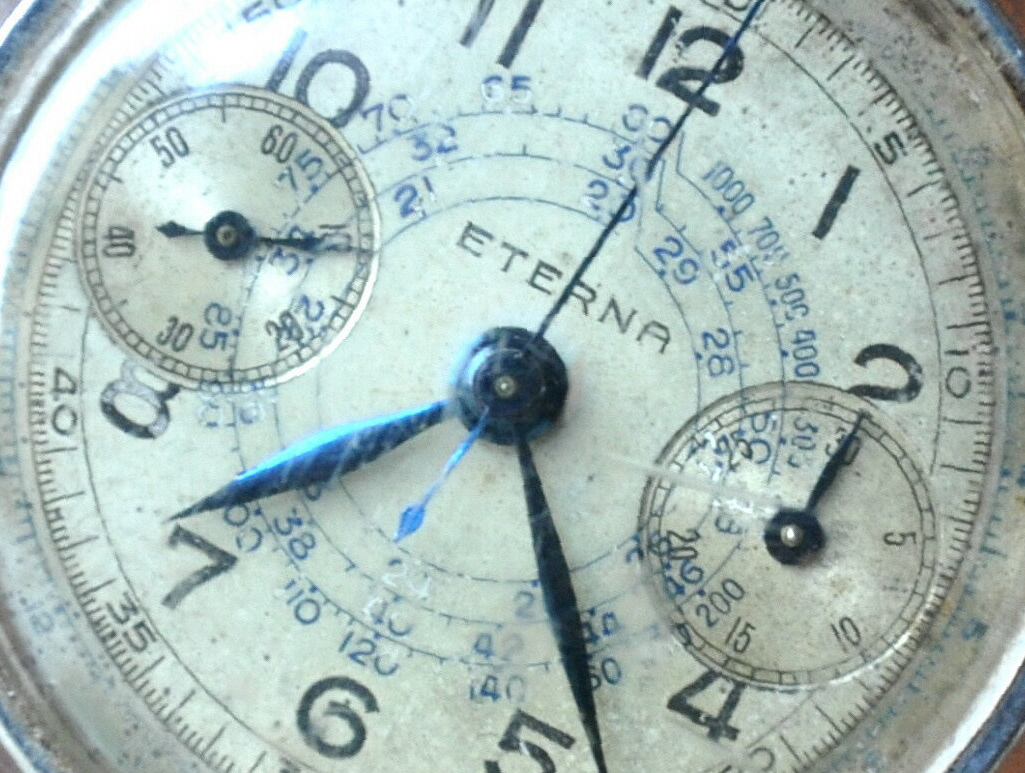
Eterna, detail
