= Société Suisse pour l'Industrie Horlogère =

Swiss watchmaker

Société suisse pour l'industrie horlogère (SSIH) is a former group of Swiss watchmakers comprising the brands Omega, Tissot and Lemania.

== History ==
SSIH was created on February 24, 1930 in Geneva by Tissot and Omega, to be joined in 1932 by Lemania Watch Co and A. Lugrin Co in L'Orient (Vallée de Joux). The company specialized in the manufacture of horological complications, enabling Omega to obtain the timing of the 1932 Olympic Games in Los Angeles. This was an important step for the development of Omega's important Sports' Watches segment with exclusive chronographs, such as the Omega Speedmaster.

The merger agreement foresaw Omega's concentration on the luxury watch segment, whereas Tissot's mission was to concentrate on the medium price range segment.

In 1983, SSIH and the Allgemeine Gesellschaft der schweizerischen Uhrenindustrie AG (ASUAG) the other most important Swiss Watch Group, were forced by their Swiss Banks to merge into a new holding company named Société de Microélectronique et d'Horlogerie (SMH), which has now been renamed the Swatch Group.

Dr. Ernst Thomke was its first CEO until 1991. He instigated a total overhaul of both Omega and Tissot line of products, positioning both brands successfully back into the world markets.
