= Movement (clockwork) =

Mechanism of a watch or clock

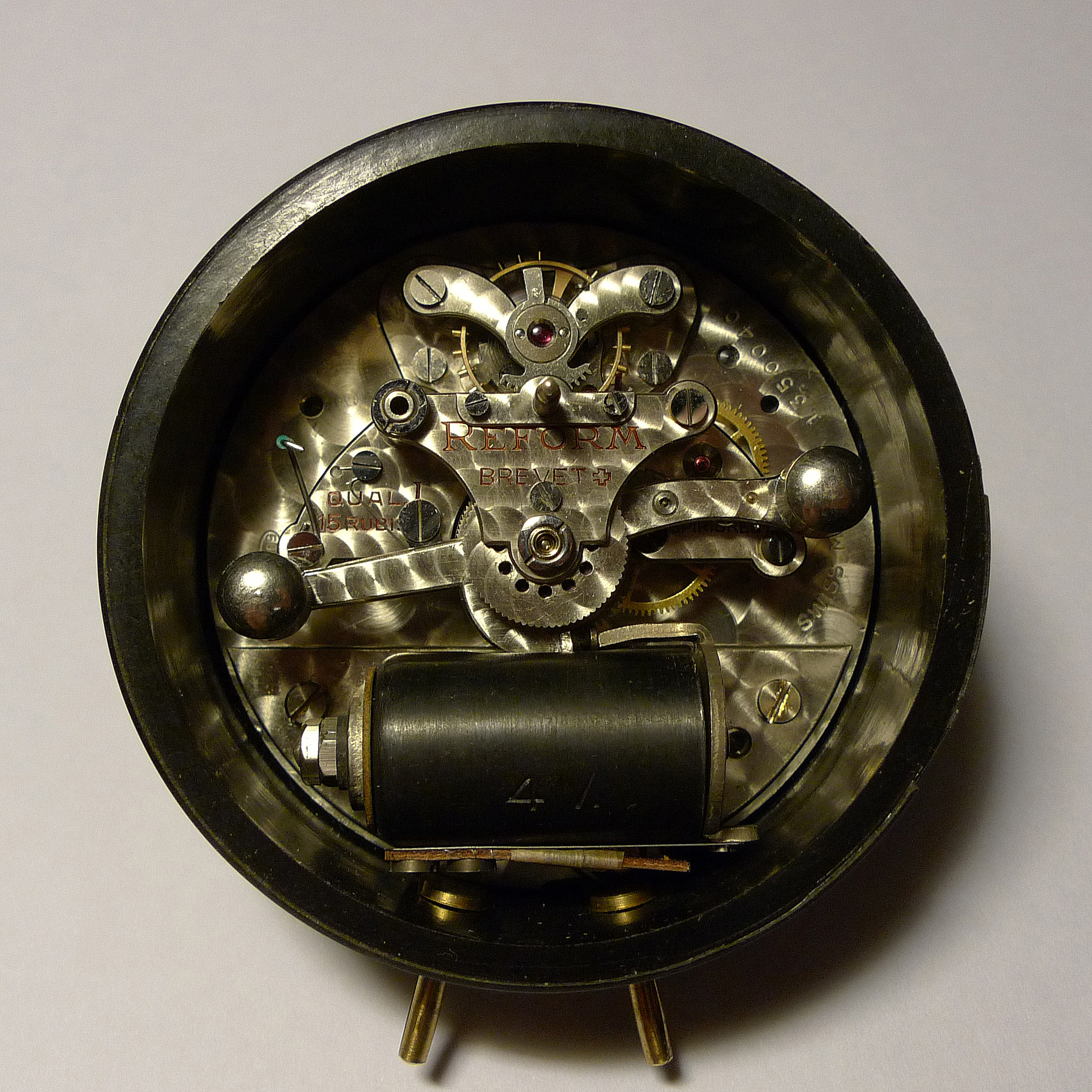
Electromechanical self-winding clock movement from Switzerland

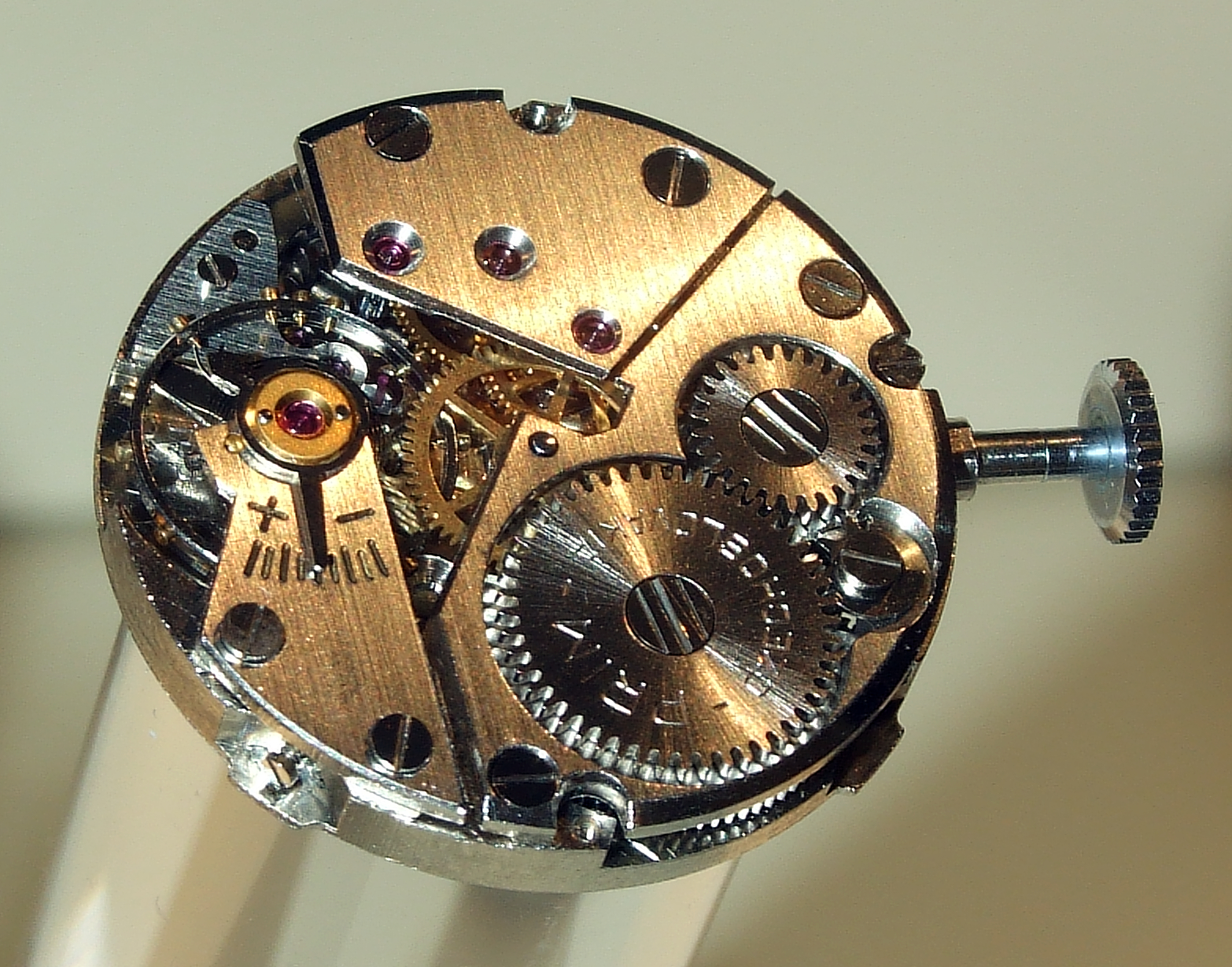
Movement of a Czech wristwatch

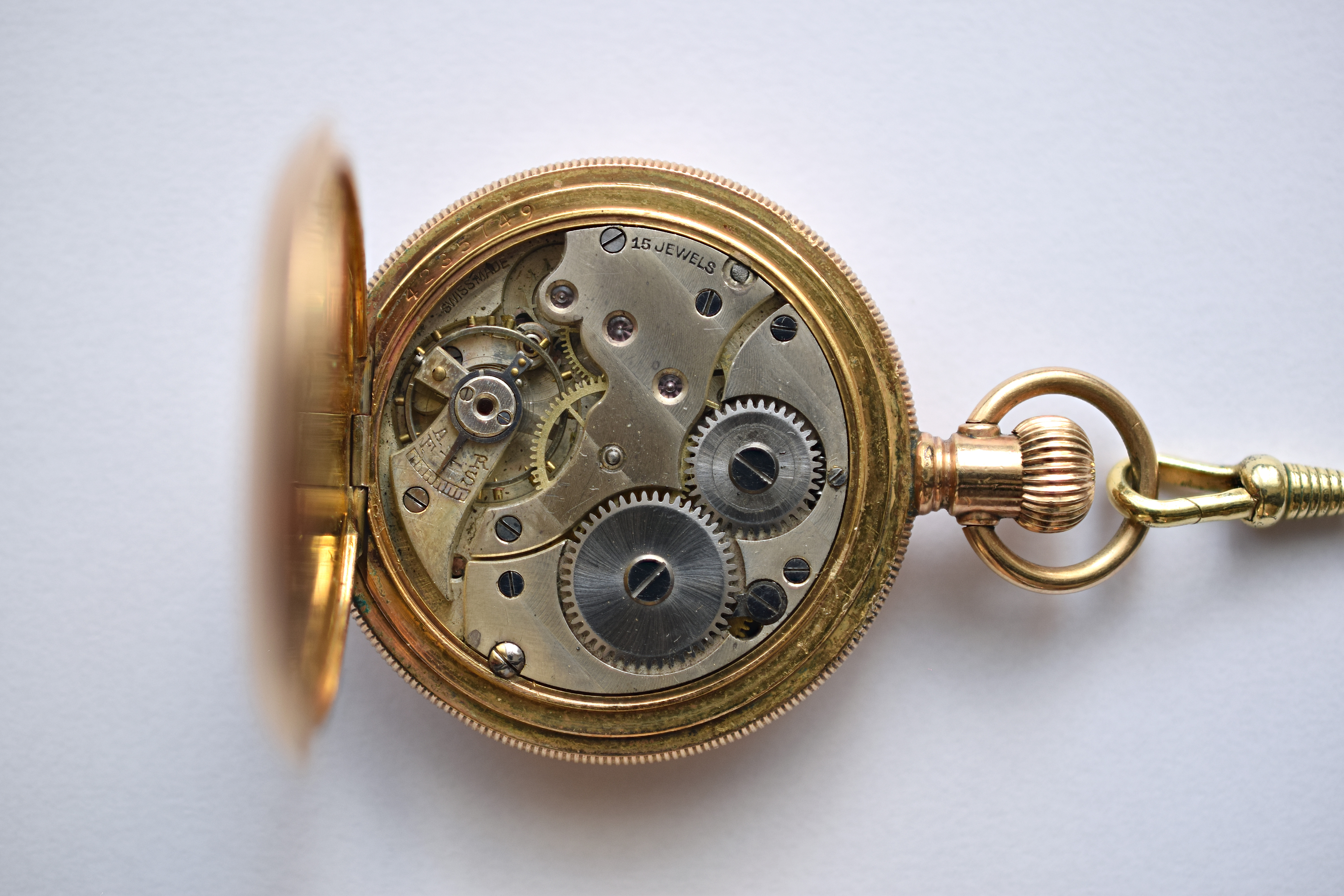
Movement of an old pocket watch

In horology, a movement, also known as a caliber or calibre (British English), is the mechanism of a watch or timepiece, as opposed to the case, which encloses and protects the movement, and the face, which displays the time. The term originated with mechanical timepieces, whose clockwork movements are made of many moving parts. The movement of a digital watch is more commonly known as a module.

In modern mass-produced clocks and watches, the same movement is often inserted into many different styles of case. When buying a quality pocketwatch from the mid-19th to the mid-20th century, for example, the customer would select a movement and case individually. Mechanical movements get dirty and the lubricants dry up, so they must periodically be disassembled, cleaned, and lubricated. One source recommends servicing intervals of: 3–5 years for watches, 15–20 years for grandfather clocks, 10–15 years for wall or mantel clocks, 15–20 years for anniversary clocks, and 7 years for cuckoo clocks, with the longer intervals applying to antique timepieces.

== Mechanical movements ==
A mechanical movement contains all the moving parts of a watch or clock except the hands, and in the case of pendulum clocks, the pendulum and driving weights. The movement is made of the following components:

Power source
Either a mainspring, or a weight suspended from a cord wrapped around a pulley. A mechanism on the mainspring or pulley allows it to be wound up, with a ratchet to prevent unwinding. Gear teeth on the barrel or pulley drive the centre wheel.
Wheel train
A wheel train is a gear train that transmits the force of the power source to the escapement. Large wheel gears mesh with smaller pinion gears.

The wheels in a typical going train consist of a centre wheel, third wheel, and fourth wheel. A separate set of wheels, the "motion work", divide the minute hand's motion by 12 to move the hour hand. Watches are fitted with an additional set known as the "keyless work", which enables the hands to be set.

Escapement
An escapement is a mechanism that allows the wheel train to advance, or escape a fixed amount with each swing of the balance wheel or pendulum. It includes a gear known as the escape wheel, which is released one tooth at a time by a rocking lever. Each time the escape wheel moves forward it exerts force on the pendulum or balance wheel, pushing it to keep it in motion.
Oscillator
The timekeeping element, either a pendulum or a balance wheel. It swings back and forth, with a consistent and precise time interval between each swing, called the beat. A pendulum movement has a pendulum hangar. This is usually attached to a sturdy support on the back, from which the pendulum is suspended and a fork which gives the pendulum impulses. The oscillator always includes the means to adjust the rate of the clock. Pendulums are usually fitted with an adjustment nut under the bob, while balance wheels have a regulator lever on the balance spring.

== Types of movements ==
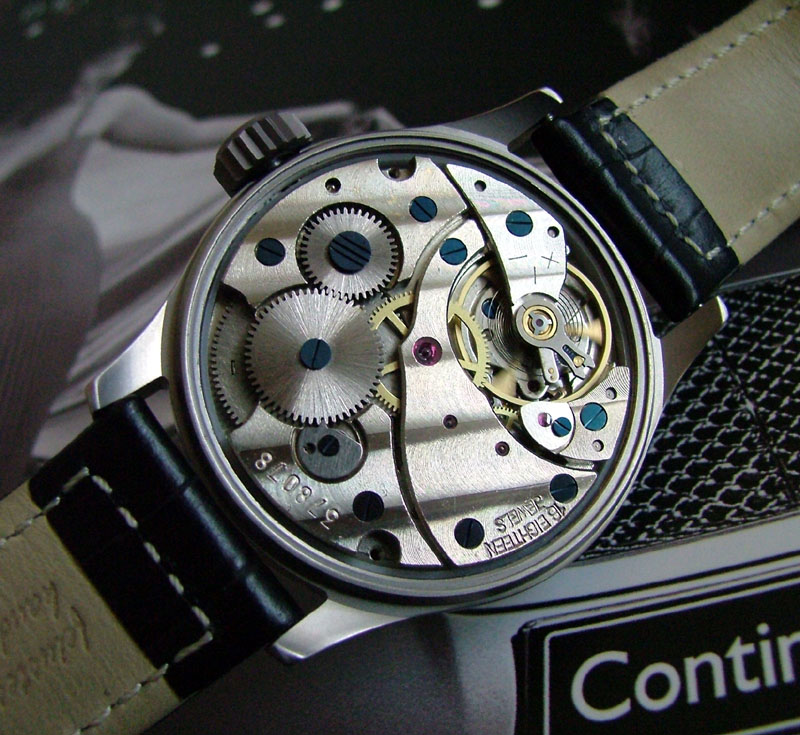
A modern bridge watch movement

Watch movements come in various shapes to fit different case styles, such as round, tonneau, rectangular, rectangular with cut corners, oval and baguette, and are measured in lignes, or in millimetres. Each specific watch movement is called a caliber. The movement parts are separated into two main categories: those belonging to the ébauches and those belonging to the assortments.

In watch movements the wheels and other moving parts are mounted between two plates, which are held a small distance apart with pillars to make a rigid framework for the movement. One of these plates, the front plate just behind the face, is always circular, or the same shape and dimensions as the movement. The back plate has various shapes:

Full plate movement
In this design, used in the earliest pocketwatches until the 18th century, the back plate was also circular. All the parts of the watch were mounted between the two plates except the balance wheel, which was mounted on the outside of the back plate, held by a bracket called the balance cock.
Three-quarter plate movement
In the 18th century, to make movements thinner, part of the back plate was cut away to make room for the balance and balance cock.
Bridge movement
In modern watch movements, the back plate is replaced with a series of plates or bars, called bridges. This makes servicing the movement easier, since individual bridges and the wheels they support can be removed and installed without disturbing the rest of the movement. The first bridge movements, in Swiss pocketwatches from around 1900, had three parallel bar bridges to support the three wheels of the going train. This style is called a three finger or Geneva movement.

Mechanical movement, Deutsches Museum, München

Mechanical watch movements are also classified as manual or automatic:

Manual or hand winding
In this type the wearer must turn the crown periodically, often daily, in order to wind the mainspring, storing energy to run the watch until the next winding.
Automatic or self-winding
In an automatic watch, including in most mechanical watches sold today, the mainspring is automatically wound by the natural motions of the wearer's wrist while it is being worn, eliminating the need for manual winding.

Additionally, a distinction is also sometimes made on whether or not the movement offers hacking, allowing the second hand to be stopped.

== Caliber ==
In horology, "caliber" refers to the specific internal mechanism of a watch or clock, also known as a movement. Although the term originally was only used to refer to the size of a movement, it is now used to designate a specific model (although the same caliber can be used in many different watches or clocks). Different watch manufacturers tend to use their own identification system to number their calibers.

== See also ==
- Clockwork
- Chinese standard movement
- Spring Drive
