= The Swatch Group =

Swiss watchmaker

The Swatch Group Ltd
- Type: Public
- Traded as: SIX: UHR; UHRN
- ISIN: CH0012255151
- Industry: Watchmaking; Jewellery
- Predecessors: ASUAG; SSIH
- Founded: 1983; 43 years ago
- Headquarters: Biel/Bienne (canton of Bern), Switzerland
- Area served: Worldwide
- Key people: Nayla Hayek (chair); Ernst Tanner (vice-chair); Nick Hayek, Jr. (CEO)
- Products: Watches, Jewelry, Electronic systems
- Revenue: ▼CHF 6.74 billion (2024)
- Operating income: ▼CHF 304 million (2024)
- Net income: ▼CHF 193 million (2024)
- Total assets: ▼CHF 13.99 billion (2024)
- Total equity: ▼CHF 12.11 billion (2024)
- Number of employees: 32,477 (2024)
- Subsidiaries: List: Blancpain; Breguet; Certina; ETA SA; Flik Flak; Glashütte Original; Hamilton Watch Company; Harry Winston, Inc.; Jaquet Droz; Leon Hatot; Longines; Mido; Omega SA; Rado; Renata Batteries; Swatch; Tissot
- Website: swatchgroup.com

The Swatch Group Ltd is a Swiss manufacturer of watches and jewellery. The company was founded in 1983 through the merger of ASUAG and SSIH, moving to manufacturing quartz-crystal watches to resolve the quartz crisis threatening the traditional Swiss watchmaking industry.

The Swatch Group is the largest watch company in the world and employs about 31,000 people in 50 countries. The group owns the Swatch product line and other luxury brands, including Blancpain, Breguet, Certina, ETA, Glashütte Original, Hamilton, Harry Winston, Longines, Mido, Omega, Rado, and Tissot.

== History ==
=== SSIH ===
SSIH (Société Suisse pour l'Industrie Horlogère), originated in 1930 with the merger of the Omega and Tissot companies. Swiss watch quality was high, but new technology, such as the Hamilton Electric watch introduced in 1957 and the Bulova Accutron tuning fork watch in 1961, presaged increasing technological competition.

In the late 1970s, SSIH became insolvent due in part to a recession and in part to heavy competition from inexpensive Asian-made quartz crystal watches. These difficulties occurred even though it had become Switzerland's largest, and the world's third largest, producer of watches. Its creditor banks assumed control in 1981.

=== ASUAG ===
ASUAG (Allgemeine Gesellschaft der Schweizerischen Uhrenindustrie), formed in 1931, was the world's largest producer of watch movements and the parts thereof (balance wheels, balance springs, assortments, watch stones ("jewels")). ASUAG had also integrated an array of watch brands in 1972 into a sub-holding company, General Watch Co. ASUAG failed similarly in 1982.

=== The Swatch Group ===
ASUAG/SSIH was formed in 1983 from the two financially troubled predecessor companies, ASUAG and SSIH. Taken private in 1985 by then-CEO Nicolas Hayek, with the understanding of the Swiss banks and the financial assistance of a group of Swiss private investors (in particular Stephan Schmidheiny and Esther Grether), it was renamed SMH (Société de Microélectronique et d'Horlogerie) in 1986, and ultimately Swatch Group Ltd in 1998.

The "swatch" brand of watch was launched in 1983, by the ETA SA CEO Ernst Thomke and his engineers. The quartz watch was redesigned for manufacturing efficiency and fewer parts, and the styling and design were updated.

== Brands ==
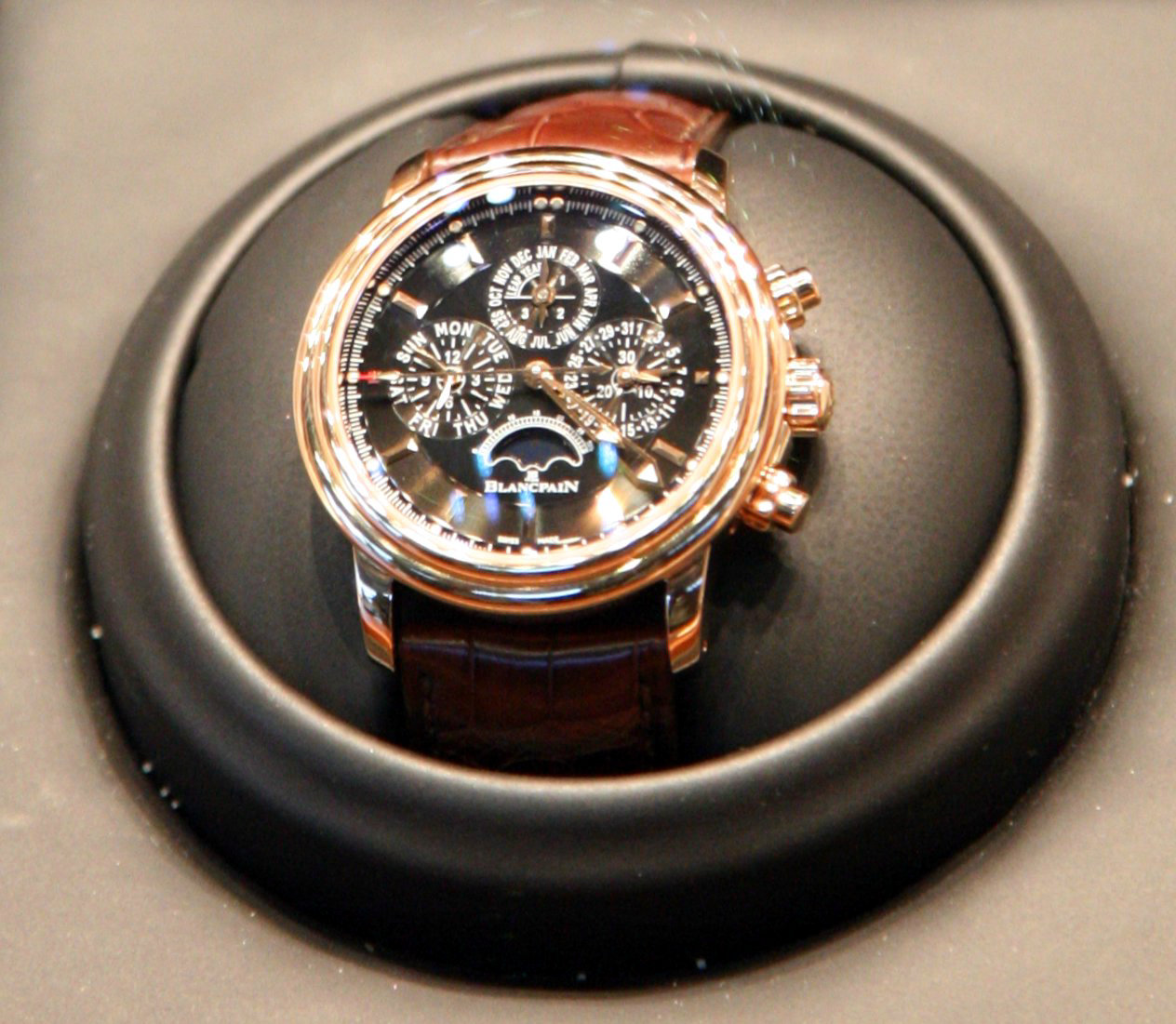
Blancpain complication wristwatch

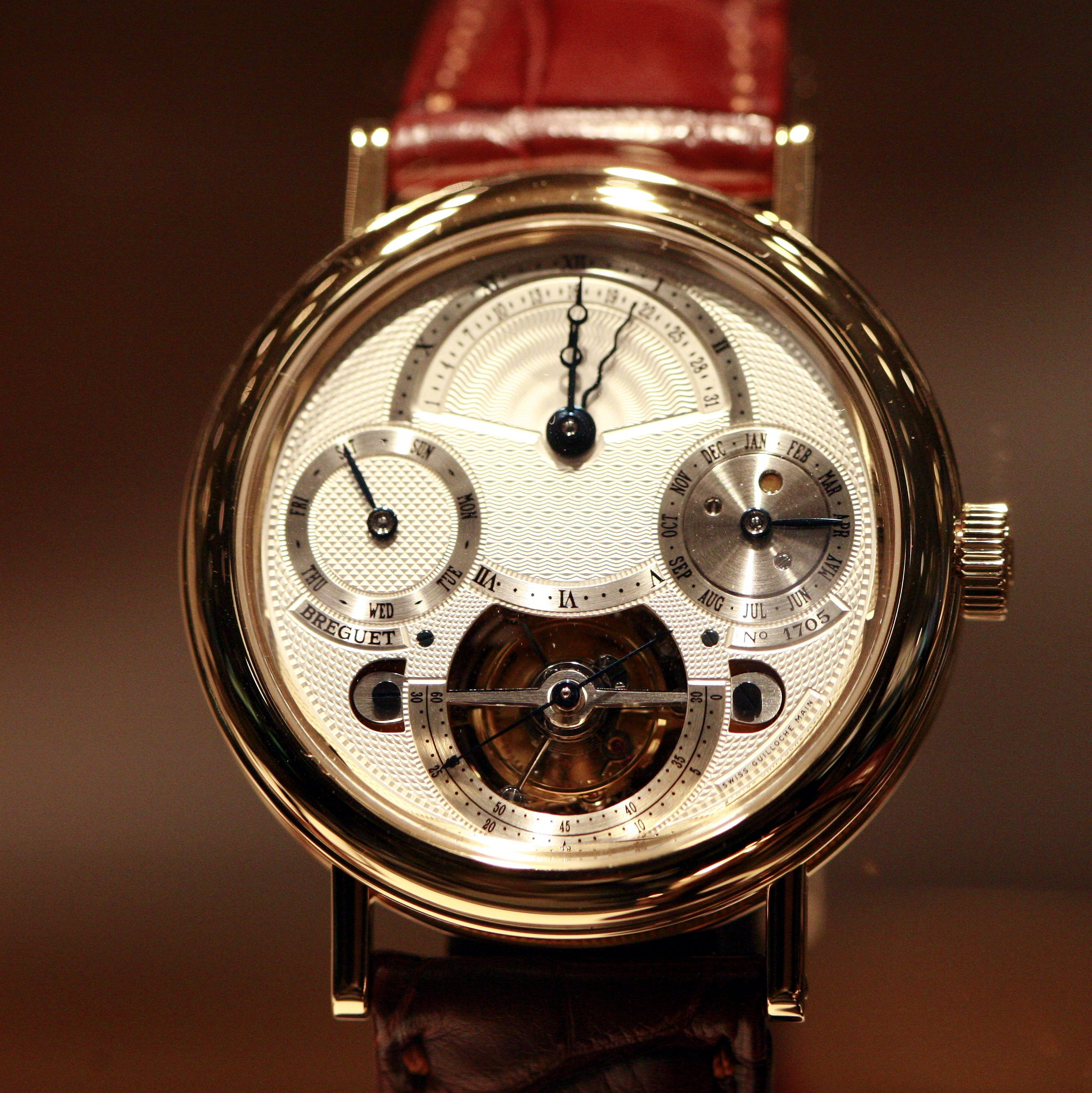
Breguet No. 1705 tourbillon wristwatch

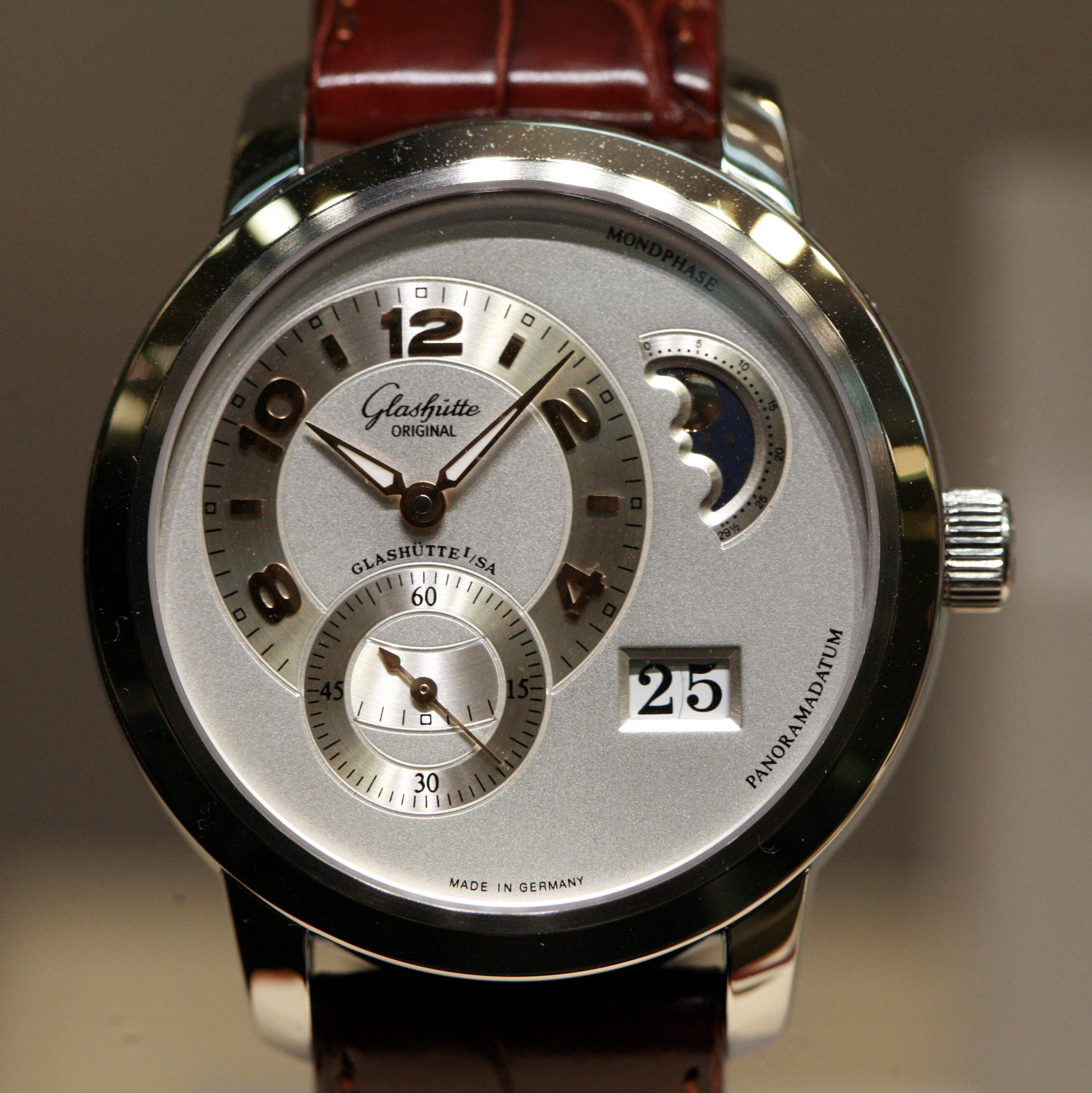
Panomatic Lunar watch by Glashütte Original

Over the years, the Swatch Group acquired various luxury watchmaking companies, including Blancpain S. A. (founded 1735, bought by Swatch in 1992), Breguet S. A. (founded 1775, bought in 1999), and Glashütte Original (Germany, bought in 2000). The company continued to produce watches under these names.

HW Holding Inc., owner of Harry Winston, Inc., an American jewellery and luxury watch company, was acquired on 26 March 2013 for 711 million Swiss francs. Nayla Hayek became the CEO. The company bought the world's biggest flawless blue diamond, The Winston Blue, on 15 May 2014.

In 2018, Swatch Group classified their brands as "Prestige and Luxury", "High", "Middle" and "Basic".

The following list includes the brands owned by the Swatch Group:

Current

- Balmain
- Blancpain
- Breguet
- Certina
- Flik Flak
- Glashütte Original
- Hamilton
- Harry Winston
- Jaquet Droz
- Longines
- Mido
- Omega
- Rado
- Swatch
- Tissot
- Union Glashütte

Discontinued or sold

- Calvin Klein Watches
- Endura
- Léon Hatot

== Watch manufacturing ==
=== ETA movement ===
Swatch subsidiary ETA SA, which is based in Grenchen, Switzerland, furnishes many OEM brands, such as LVMH (which markets TAG Heuer, Hublot and Zenith watch lines) and Richemont (which markets amongst others, A. Lange & Söhne, Baume & Mercier, IWC Schaffhausen, Jaeger-LeCoultre, Officine Panerai, Piaget, Roger Dubuis, Vacheron Constantin).

=== Electronic systems ===
The Swatch Group Electronic System includes:

- Belenos Clean Power AG.
- EM Microelectronic-Marin: Designs and produces ultra-low power, low voltage mixed-signal integrated circuits, LCD and modules. IC Product lines include RFID, microcontroller, smart card, ASIC, RTC, reset circuit, watchdog, LCD driver, opto ICs.
- Micro Crystal: produces miniature low power quartz crystals and small low power oscillators.
- Renata: develops and produces micro batteries. Product lines include button cells and rechargeable (Lithium Polymer) batteries.

=== Swatch Internet Time ===
In 1998, Swatch invented "Swatch Internet Time", intended as a global time system, which divides the day into 1000 "beats" in a single worldwide time zone.

In October 2004, Swatch introduced its first smart watch, the Paparazzi, based on Microsoft Corporation's SPOT (Smart Personal Objects Technology.)

=== Watchmaking school ===
The Swatch Group started offering their first class in the Nicolas G. Hayek Watchmaking School in Miami, Florida, in September 2005. There are other watchmaking schools in Glashütte, Germany; Pforzheim, Germany; Kuala Lumpur, Malaysia; and Shanghai, China.

== Sponsorship ==
=== Sport and event timing ===
Swiss Timing, under brands such as Omega, Longines, and Tissot, provide timing services for sporting events such as Formula One, Olympic Games, Tour de France, and equestrian events. In 2018, it was announced that The Swatch Group would hold its own watch fair in Zurich, during Baselworld 2019.

=== Ventures ===
In 1994, Swatch entered into a joint venture with Germany's Daimler AG to produce the Smart car, but they later withdrew from this project.

Swatch subsidiary Belenos Clean Power AG entered into a joint venture with the Paul Scherrer Institut in May 2008 to develop a hydrogen fuel cell for a fuel cell powered car. Swatch began test drives of the car in Switzerland in 2012. However, the Swatch Group abandoned the project for a fuel-cell-powered car in June 2015, to concentrate instead on a new type of battery with high storage capacity.

== See also ==
- Quartz crisis
- List of watch manufacturers
