= Gate guardian =

Symbolic guardian at a military facility

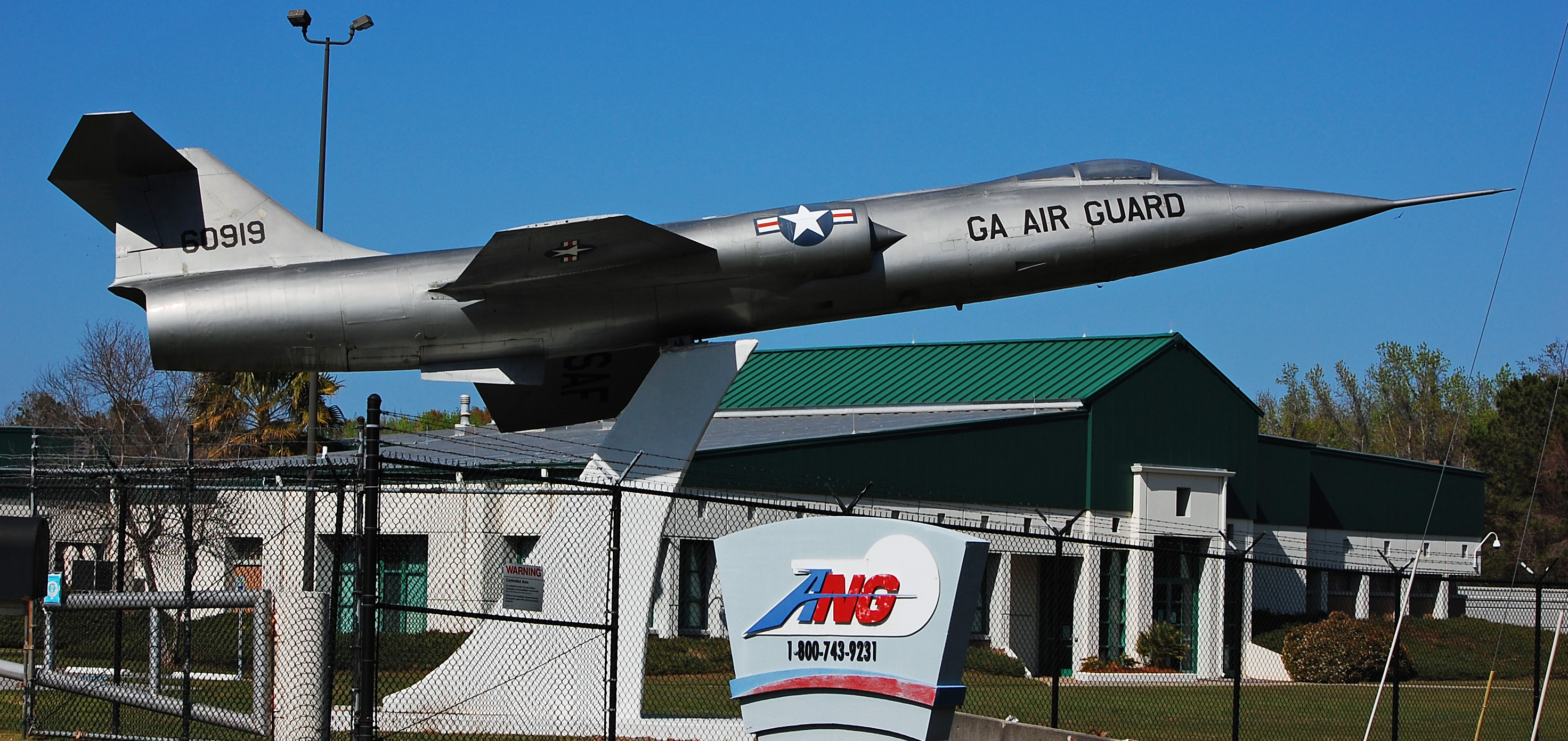
F-104 at the Georgia Air National Guard

A gate guardian or gate guard is a withdrawn piece of equipment, often an aircraft, armoured vehicle, artillery piece, or locomotive, mounted on a plinth and used as a static display near to and forming a symbolic display of "guarding" the main entrance to a site, especially a military base. Commonly, gate guardians outside airbases are decommissioned examples of aircraft that were once based there, or still are.

== Examples ==
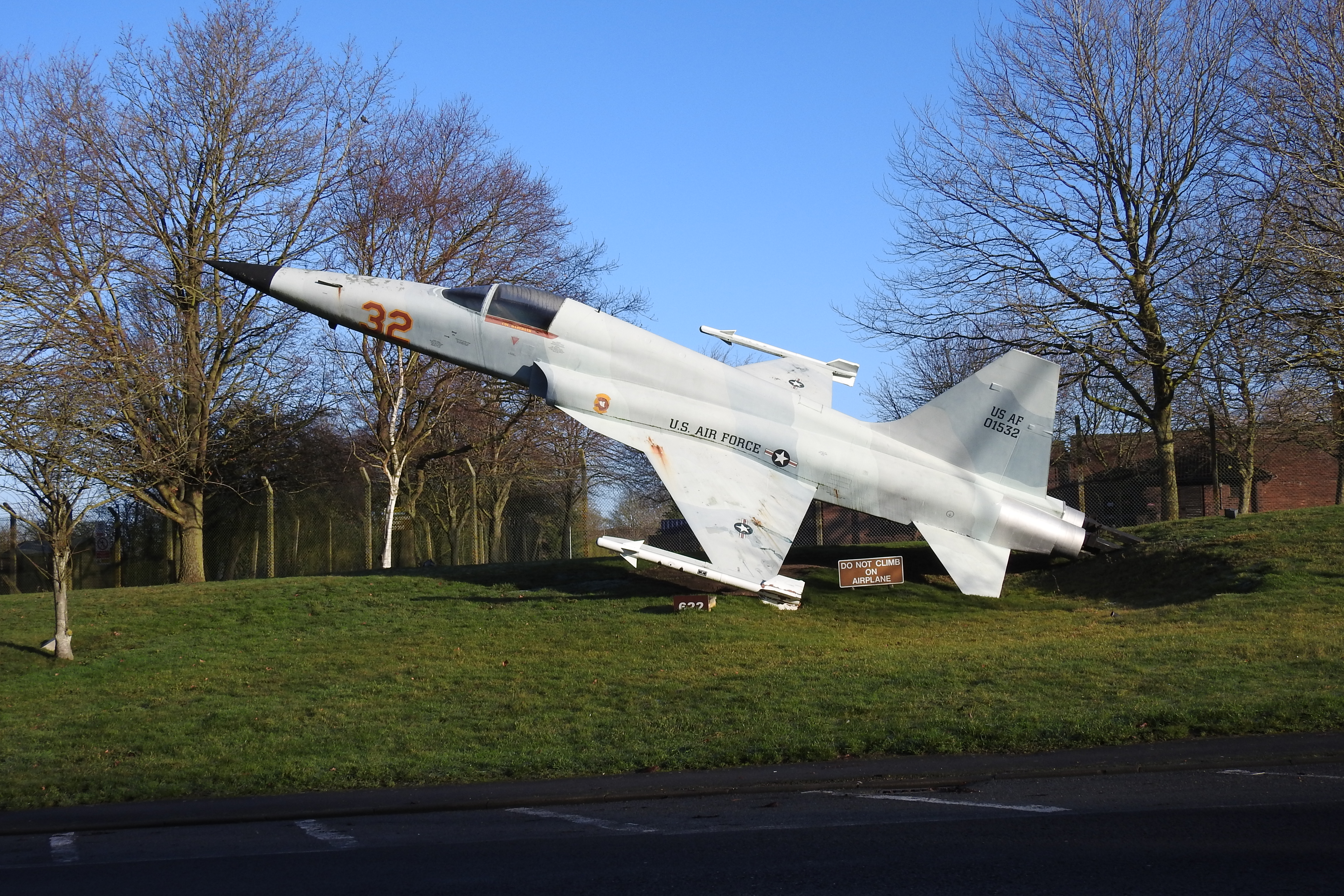
Gate guardians may be real vehicles or scale models, as demonstrated with this 100% scale model F-5E Tiger, which serves as the gate guardian for RAF Alconbury, England.

Examples of gate guardians include the following:

=== Australia ===
In Australia, gate guards are also often found outside Returned and Services League of Australia (RSL) clubs. These are usually artillery pieces such as 25 pounders and 40mm Bofors anti-aircraft guns, but the RSL club at Mulwala has a Douglas Dakota transport aircraft and Dandenong RSL club has a Bell UH-1 Iroquois helicopter. Several aircraft are on display at the gate of RAAF Base Wagga, as part of a small adjacent museum. RAAF Base Edinburgh has a Lockheed P-3 Orion maritime patrol aircraft and a Leopard 1 tank as gate guardians, reflecting its use as both an air force and an army base. RAAF Base Darwin has two Bristol Bloodhound surface-to-air missiles as gate guardians.

=== Finland ===
- A MiG-21 formerly of the Finnish Air Force is on display at the entrance of Kuopio Airport.
- Two T-34s at the Armoured Brigade.

=== Malaysia ===
- A-4PTM at RMAF Air Force School, Ipoh.
- CL-41G Tebuan and Northrop F-5 at RMAF Kuantan Air Base.
- A-4PTM and Northrop F-5 at Istana Abu Bakar, the main palace of the Sultan of Pahang.
- CAC Sabre, Northrop F-5, Pilatus PC-7, Alouette III and a fire truck at RMAF Gong Kedak Air Base.
- A-4PTM at RMAF Labuan Air Base.
- Northrop F-5 at RMAF Sendayan Base. It was reported a retired Mikoyan MiG-29 will be installed as a new gate guardian at the base in the future.
- Northrop F-5 at RMAF Butterworth Air Base.
- A-4PTM at RMAF Kuching Air Base.

=== Saudi Arabia ===
- Lockheed L-1011 TriStar which operated under the airline Saudia in the 1970s is placed on a tarmac next to the gate at Royal Saudi Air Force Museum in Riyadh.

=== South Africa ===
- Atlas Impala at Air Force Base Ysterplaat.
- Twin Eland Mk7 Armoured Cars at the SANDF Legal Satellite Office, Air Force Base Swartkop.
- Rooikat and M3 Stuart at 1 Special Service Battalion, Tempe Base.
- Eland Mk7 at School of Armour, Tempe Base.

=== Switzerland ===
- Lockheed F-104 Starfighter at Grenchen Airport in Grenchen Switzerland.

=== United Kingdom ===
- 25 Pounder howitzers at 48 Regiment Royal Artillery, Thorney Island and two on loan from the Honourable Artillery Company outside Admiralty House (the official residence of the Commander Joint Forces Command) at Northwood Headquarters.
- BAC Jet Provost at RAF Linton-on-Ouse.
- Bristol Bloodhound surface-to-air guided missile at Hudson House Territorial Army Centre, Catford (Home of 221 (EOD) (V) Field Squadron, 101 (City of London) Engineer Regiment, Royal Engineers).
- C-47 Dakota at Headquarters 16 Air Assault Brigade, Merville Barracks.
- De Havilland Heron outside Airport House, Croydon, the former terminal building of Croydon Airport.
- FV434 Combat Recovery and Repair Vehicle and Gazelle Helicopter at Welbeck Defence Sixth Form College.
- Gloster Javelin at Staverton Airport and XA634 RAF Leeming (purchased by Gloucestershire Jet Age Museum in January 2015.).
- Hawker Hunter at RAF Halton and WV396 at RAF Valley.
- Hawker Sea Hawk at RNAS Culdrose
- Hawker Siddeley Harrier at MOD Stafford (formerly RAF Stafford) and RAF Wittering (visible from the northbound A1).
- Hurricane (replica) at the former RAF North Weald, with the markings of the No. 56 Squadron RAF, as flown by No. 249 Squadron RAF pilot Thomas 'Ginger' Neil during the Battle of Britain in September 1940.
- McDonnell Douglas Phantom at RAF Boulmer.
- Panavia Tornado at Leuchars Station
- BAE Nimrod at RAF Kinloss.
- SEPECAT Jaguar from the former RAF Coltishall, now named "Spirit of Coltishall" and displayed at County Hall, Norwich.
- SEPECAT Jaguar at RAF Cosford – installed in May 2017, but is outside the station headquarters, so not visible from the main gate.
- SEPECAT Jaguar at RAF Spadeadam
- Spitfire (replica) at Edinburgh Airport.
- Spitfire (replica) at RAF Benson.
- Spitfire and Hurricane (replicas) at RAF Uxbridge.
- Spitfire and Hurricane at RAF Biggin Hill.
- Panavia Tornado at RAF Marham.
- Panavia Tornado F3 at RAF Leeming (replaced Gloster Javelin in 2015).
- A 40% scale replica of Concorde had been located at the main road entrance to Heathrow Airport until March 2007, when it was moved to Brooklands Museum, Surrey. At Heathrow Airport, that Concorde model has been replaced by a model of an Airbus A380 in Emirates livery. In September 2012, the Concorde was finally installed at the main entrance to the whole Brooklands site.
- Chinook helicopter RAF Odiham
- BAE Hawk T1A, XX247, at RAF Woodvale
- Avro Vulcan at RAF Waddington
- Supermarine Spitfire at RAF Digby
- English Electric Lightning at BAE Samlesbury
- Hawker Siddeley HS125 Dominie T1 and BAC Jet Provost RAFC Cranwell (Both visible from the B1429)

=== United States ===
- Bell UH-1H Iroquois s/n 70–16218 at Bradley International Airport in Windsor Locks, Connecticut.
- Boeing B-47E Stratojet s/n 53–4213 at McConnell Air Force Base in Wichita, Kansas.
- Boeing KC-135A Stratotanker s/n 55–3118 at McConnell Air Force Base in Wichita, Kansas. #1 KC-135 – City of Renton.
- Convair F-102A Delta Dagger s/n 56–1264 at Bradley Air National Guard Base in Windsor Locks, Connecticut.
- Fairchild Republic A-10A Thunderbolt II s/n 79–0103 at Bradley Air National Guard Base in Windsor Locks, Connecticut.
- Lockheed A-12 s/n 60–6931 at George Bush Center for Intelligence in Langley, Virginia.
- Lockheed LC-130 at Stratton Air National Guard Base in Schenectady, New York
- Lockheed F-104C Starfighter s/n 56–0919 at Georgia Air National Guard in Brunswick, Georgia.
- Lockheed F-104N Starfighter registration N811NA at Embry-Riddle Aeronautical University, Prescott, Arizona.
- Lockheed T-33B s/n 580–9594 at Westchester County Airport (former home to the 105th Airlift Wing) in North Castle, New York.
- McDonnell Douglas AV-8B Harrier II BuNo 162969 at MCAS Cherry Point in Havelock, North Carolina.
- Three Northrop T-38 Talons painted to resemble aircraft formerly flown by the US Air Force Thunderbirds at Owatonna Degner Regional Airport in Owatonna, Minnesota
- North American F-100D Super Sabre s/n 55–3805 at Bradley Air National Guard Base in Windsor Locks, Connecticut.
- F-15A Eagle tailflash (RG) resides facing State Route 247 in front of the Museum of Aviation and serving the Russell Parkway gate in Warner Robins, Georgia, placed during 2019.
- Bell UH-1H Iroquois at Helena Regional Airport.
- Lockheed F-104 Starfighter on display at McGhee Tyson Air National Guard base.
- A Cessna 310 flown by actor Jimmy Stewart, was restored and placed as a gate guardian to Indiana County-Jimmy Stewart Airport in Pennsylvania, USA.

== Images ==
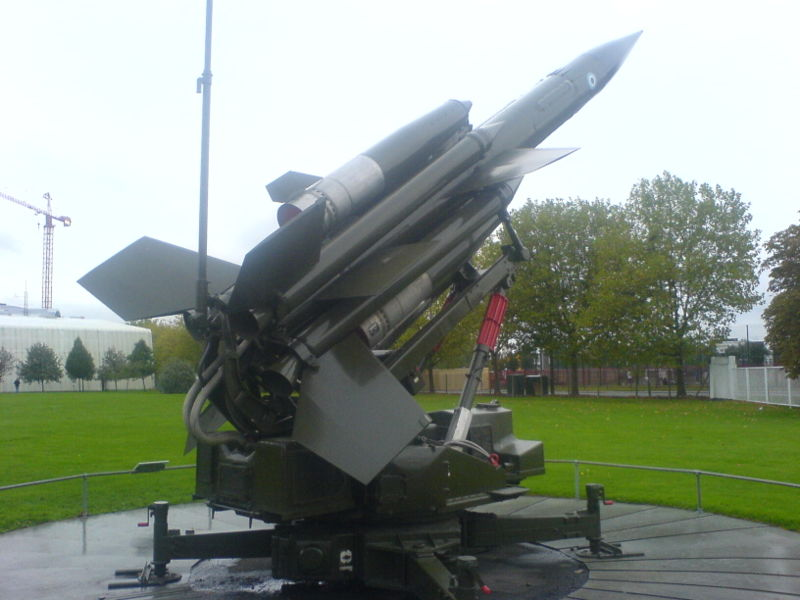
RAF Bristol Bloodhound missile outside the Royal Air Force Museum London in Hendon, London

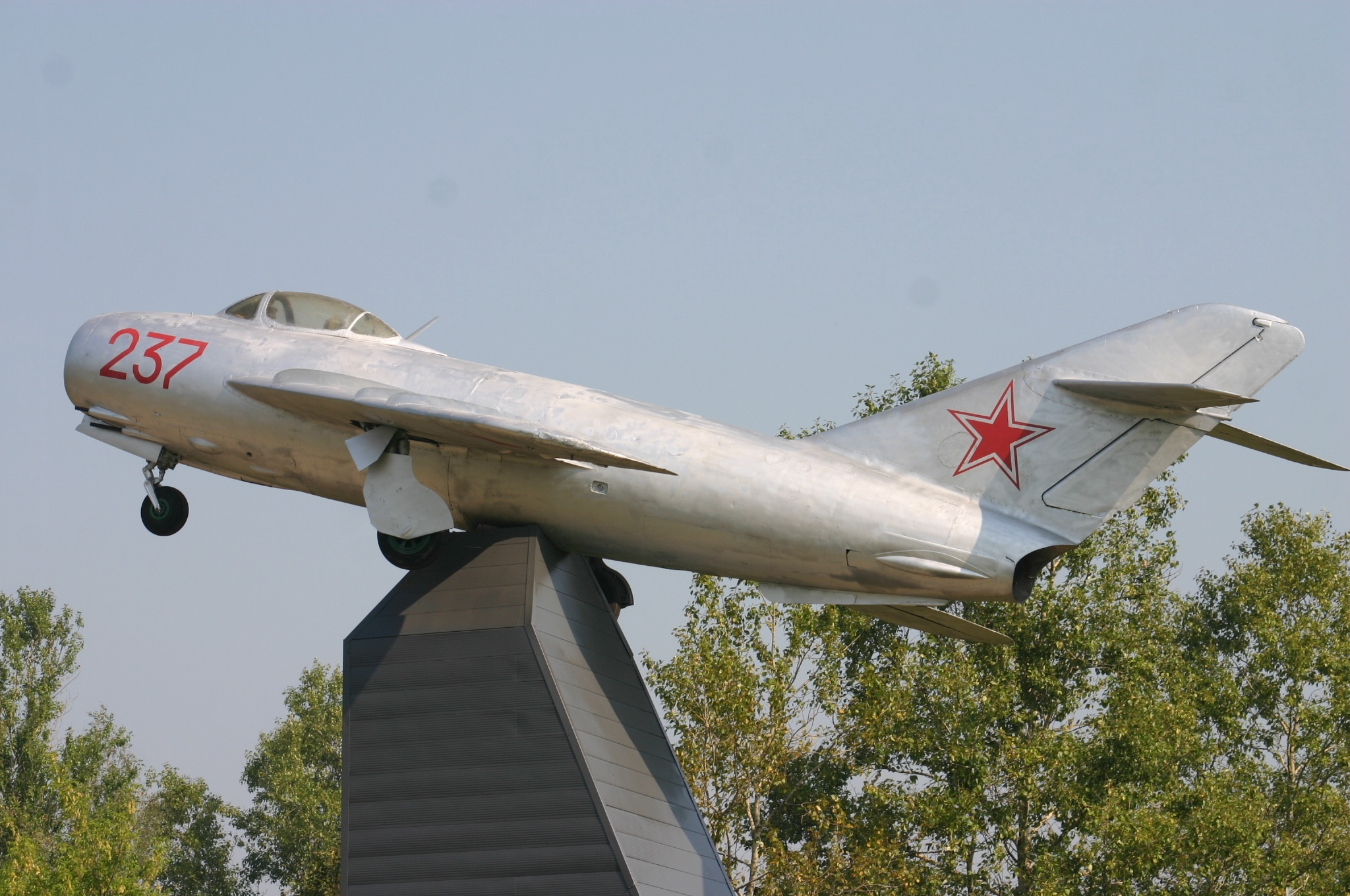
MiG-17 at Kubinka Air Base, Russia

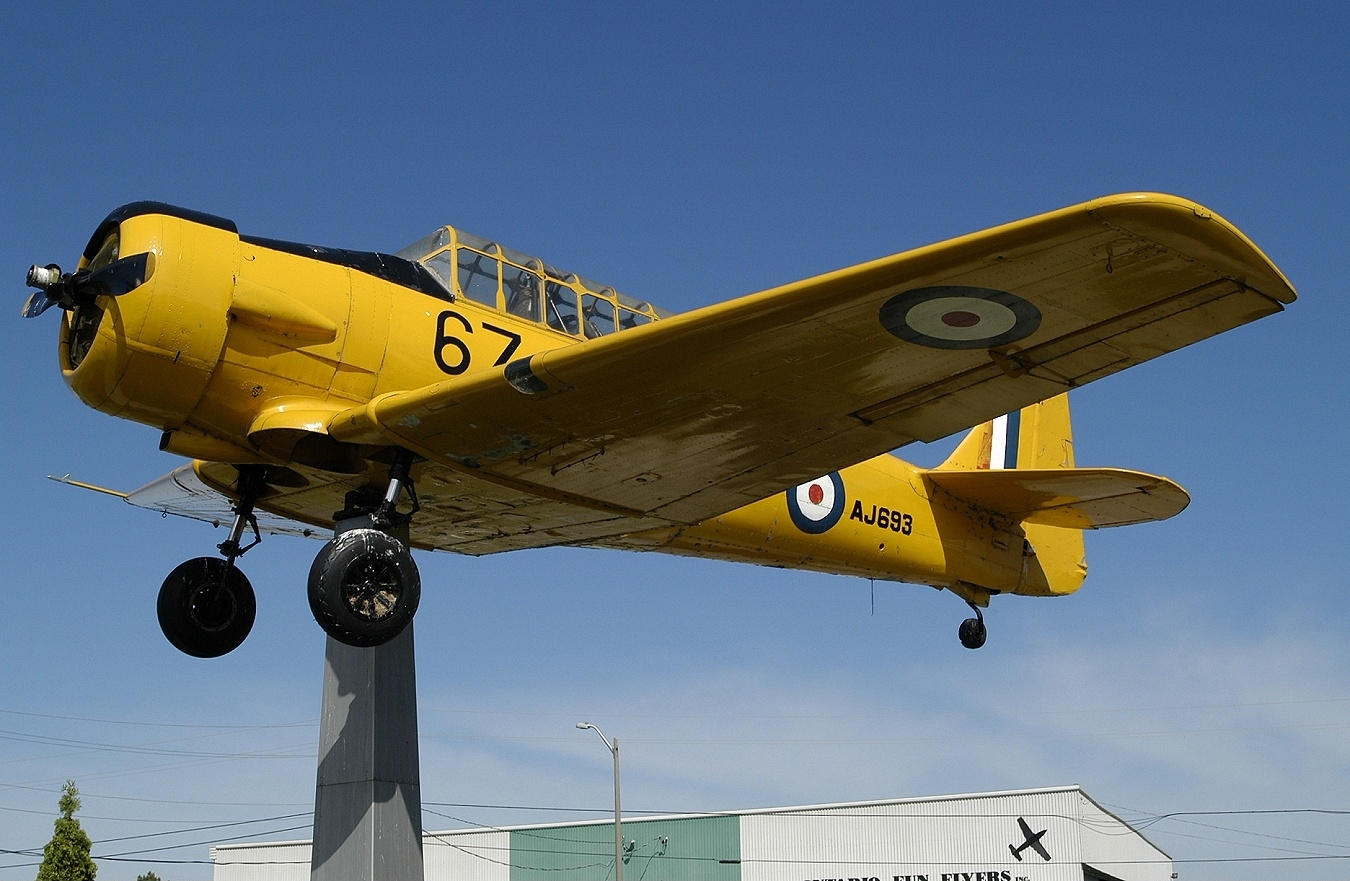
Kingston Airport (Canadian Air Force)

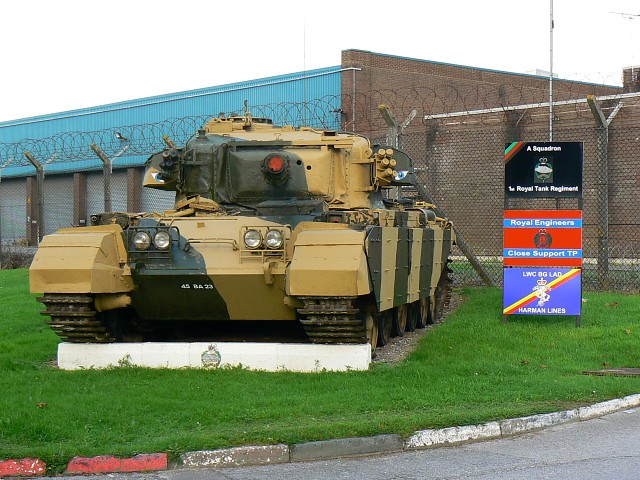
1 Tank Regiment (Royal Armoured Corps)

Fort Knox (US Army)

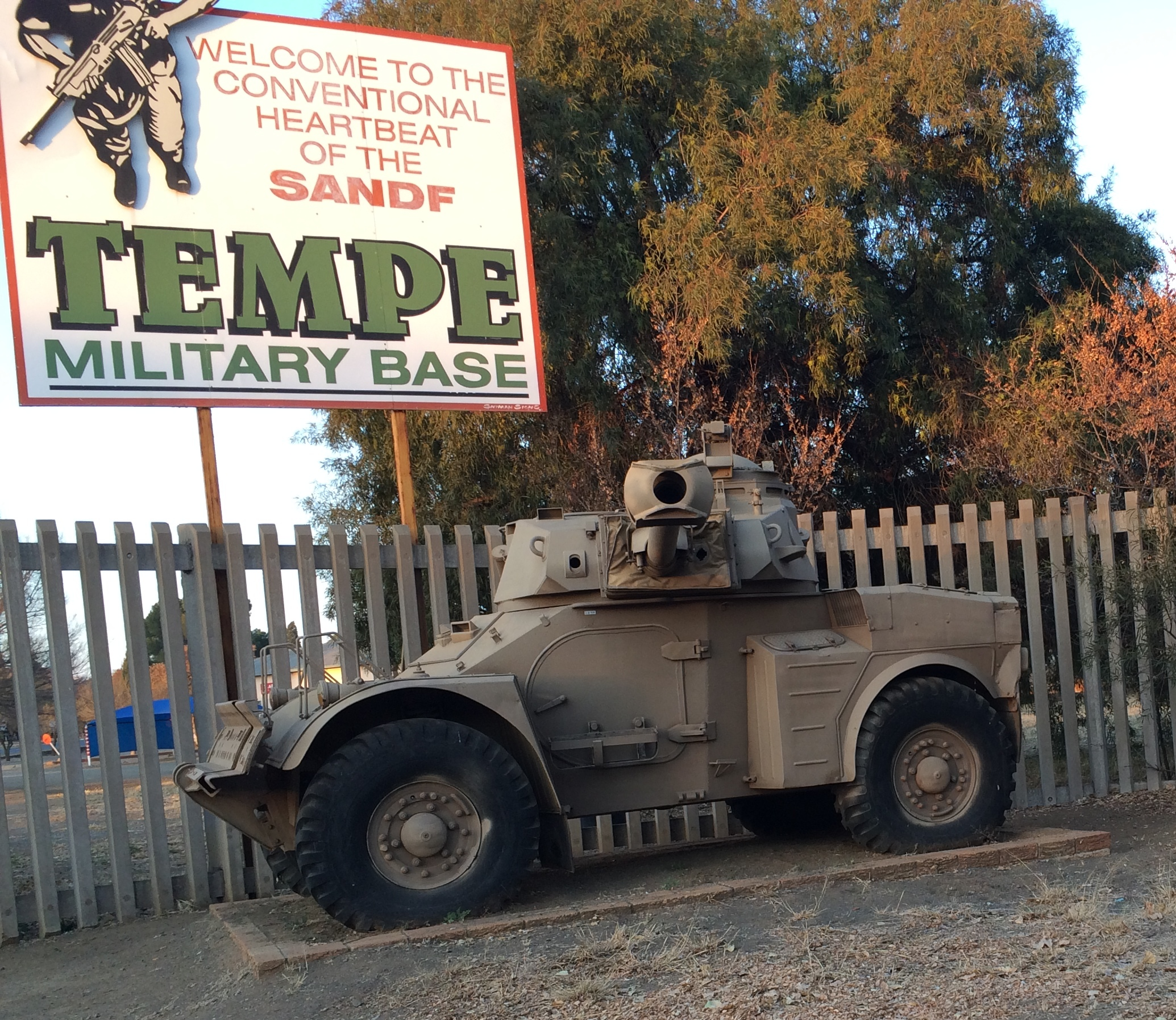
Tempe Base (South African Army)

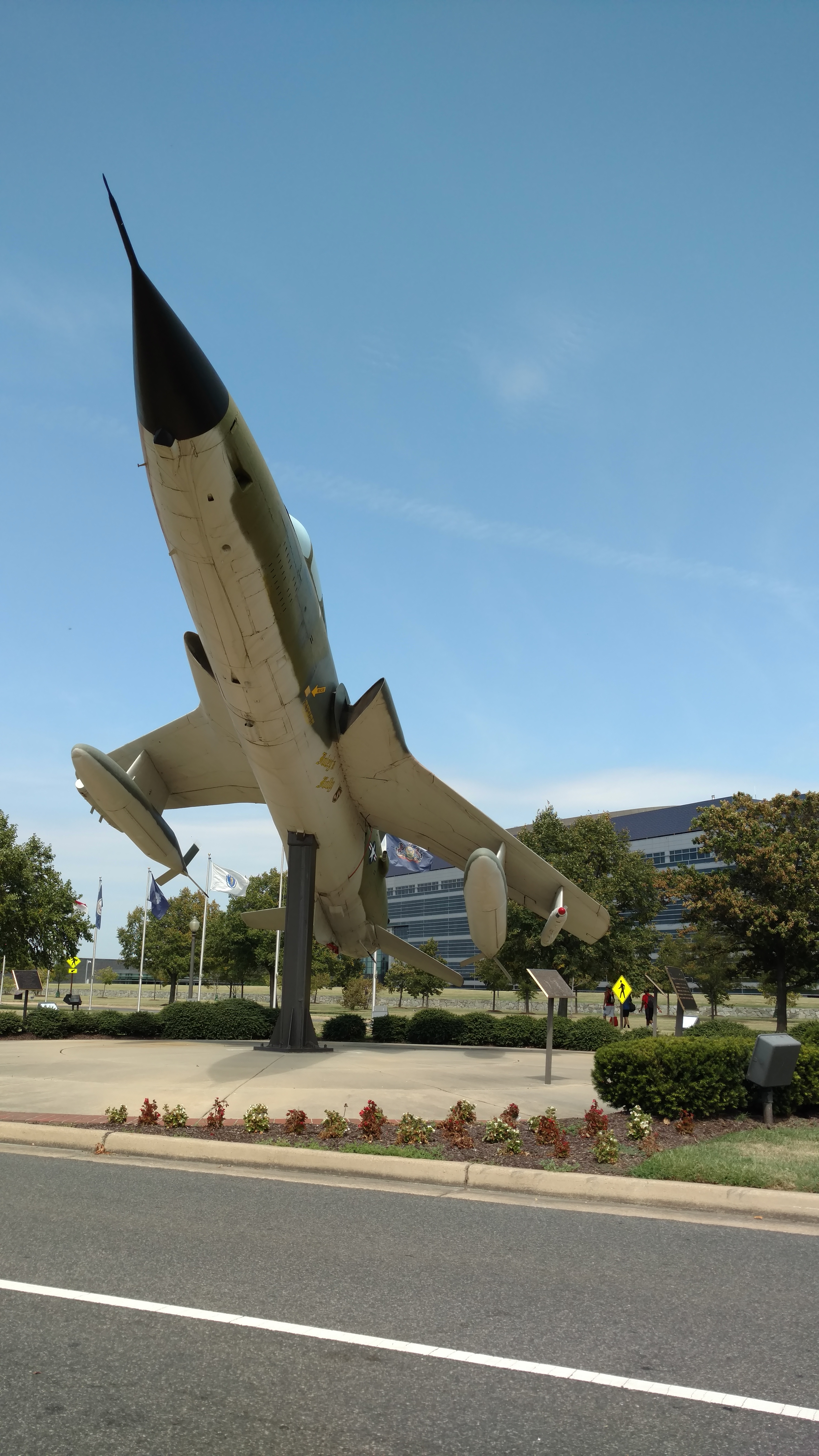
F-105 Thunderchief at Arnold Gate, Bolling Air Force Base, Washington, D.C.

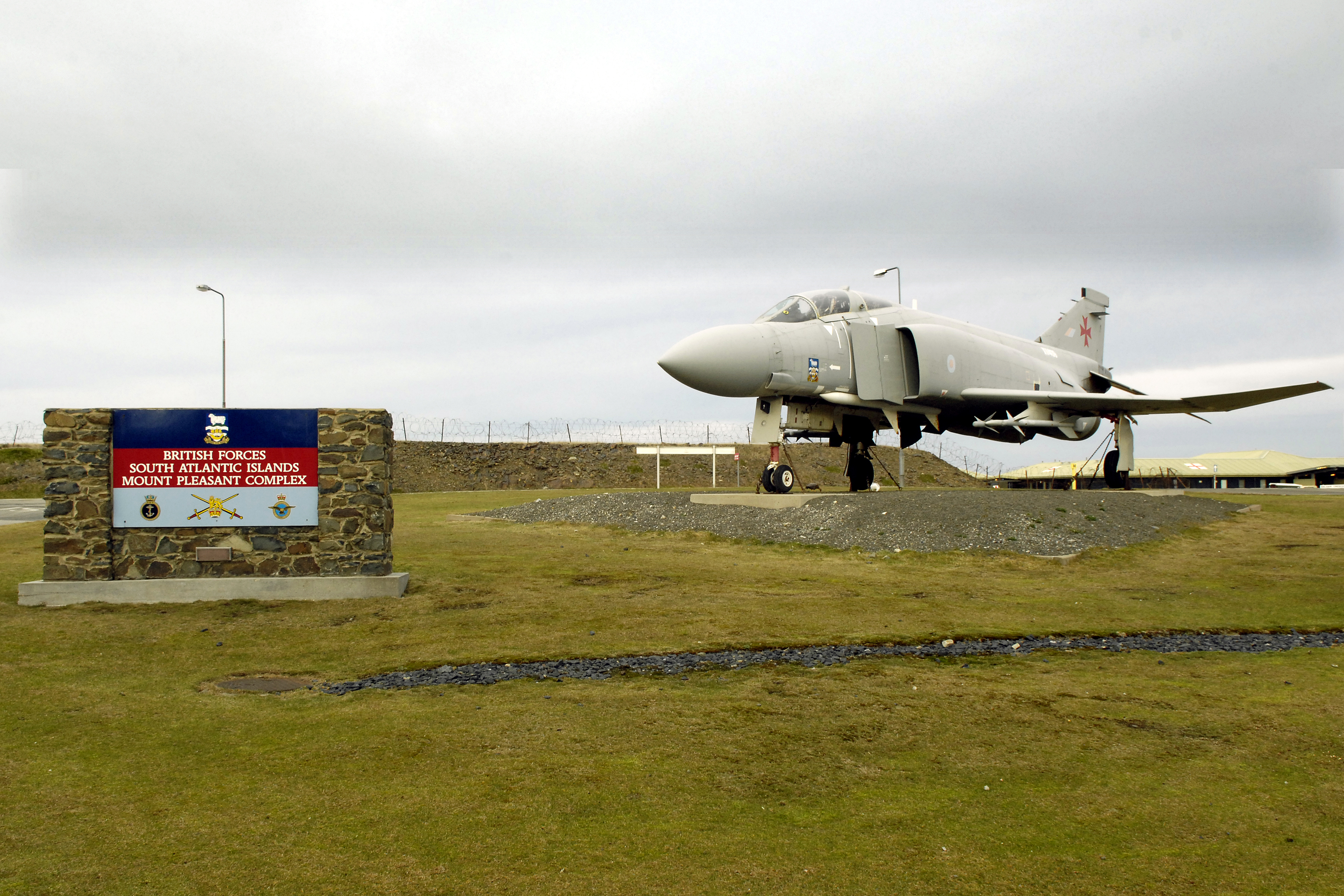
An F-4J Phantom II aircraft as the gate guardian at the entrance to the air terminal at Mount Pleasant Complex in the Falkland Islands. This was removed c. 2011

== See also ==
- Bradyll (locomotive)
