= Ernest Borel =

Swiss watch manufacturer

- Industry: Watch manufacturing
- Founded: 1856; 170 years ago
- Founders: Jules Borel
- Headquarters: Le Noirmont, Switzerland
- Area served: International
- Key people: Teguh Halim (The Board of Directors of Ernest Borel S.A.)
- Products: Wristwatches
- Website: www.ernestborel.ch

Ernest Borel is a watch manufacturer founded in 1856 in Neuchatel, Switzerland. They have traditionally focused on export markets outside Europe and won several awards in the late 19th century, including first place in the 1866 Neuchatel observatory timing accuracy competition. This was viewed by the company as an important marketing strategy for increasing the brand's value, since the Neuchatel observatory was famed at the time for its timekeeping accuracy.

== History ==
In 1876 they were awarded the "Premium Award" in Philadelphia, USA, and, in 1878, won the only "Precious Premium Award" given to the Swiss watch and clock industry in Paris, France that year. The company was run by the eponymous Borel family until 1975 when, owing to the 'Quartz crisis' affecting the entire Swiss watchmaking industry, it was sold on and became a member of the Synchron Group which consisted also of Cyma and Doxa.

In 1997, Ernest Borel was purchased by a group of investors from China. The investors appointed Raphaël Boillat as CEO, who in 2009 named his daughter, Nathalie, as successor.

Ernest Borel S.A. is headquartered at their new factory premises at Le Noirmont, Switzerland. Previously, it was located at La Chaux-de-Fonds, Switzerland. In 2018, the Hong Kong-based conglomerate Citychamp Watch & Jewellery Group, through its wholly owned subsidiary VGB Limited, partly owned the company. Mr. Teguh Halim has become its board of directors since then.

The stock of Ernest Borel Holdings Limited (Asian operations, stock code:1856) is traded on the Hong Kong Stock Exchange since 11 July 2014.

== Products ==
Ernest Borel currently produces traditionally styled automatic and quartz-movement wrist watches for men and women. The majority of their product line are dress watches and casual watches.

== Corporate and Family logo ==
Their corporate and family logo of a dancing couple in 19th-century dress is intended by the company to reflect the elegance, tradition and inspiration of romance.

== Market ==
The brand competes with brands such as Longines, Frédérique Constant, Titoni and Milus.

The prices of their watches range from the mid-hundreds up to the mid-thousands of USD.

Ernest Borel has been expanding and focusing their marketing on China, with the opening of a dedicated Ernest Borel shop in Beijing in late 2007. This also reflects the marketing strategy of their competitors.

== Football team ==
Ernest Borel sponsored a football team which played in the Hong Kong First Division League for three seasons only. The team entered the First Division by buying the HKFA membership from Sea Bee in 1990. It first appeared at the First Division League in the 1990/91 season. It won their only major trophies in 1991/92 by winning the Hong Kong Viceroy Cup and Hong Kong FA Cup. The team quit the league after the 1992/93 season.
