= Titoni =

Swiss watchmaker

Titoni Ltd.
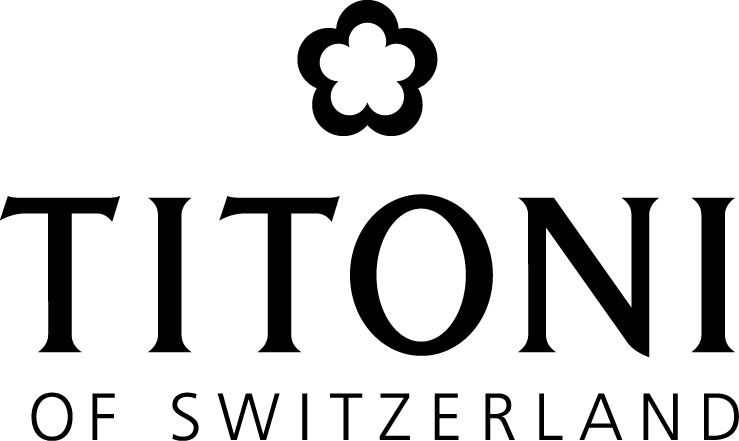
- Type: Private
- Industry: Watch Manufacturing
- Founded: 1919
- Founder: Fritz Schluep
- Headquarters: Grenchen, Switzerland
- Key people: Daniel Schluep (CEO), Marc and Olivier Schluep (Operative Leadership)
- Number of employees: 60
- Website: titoni.ch

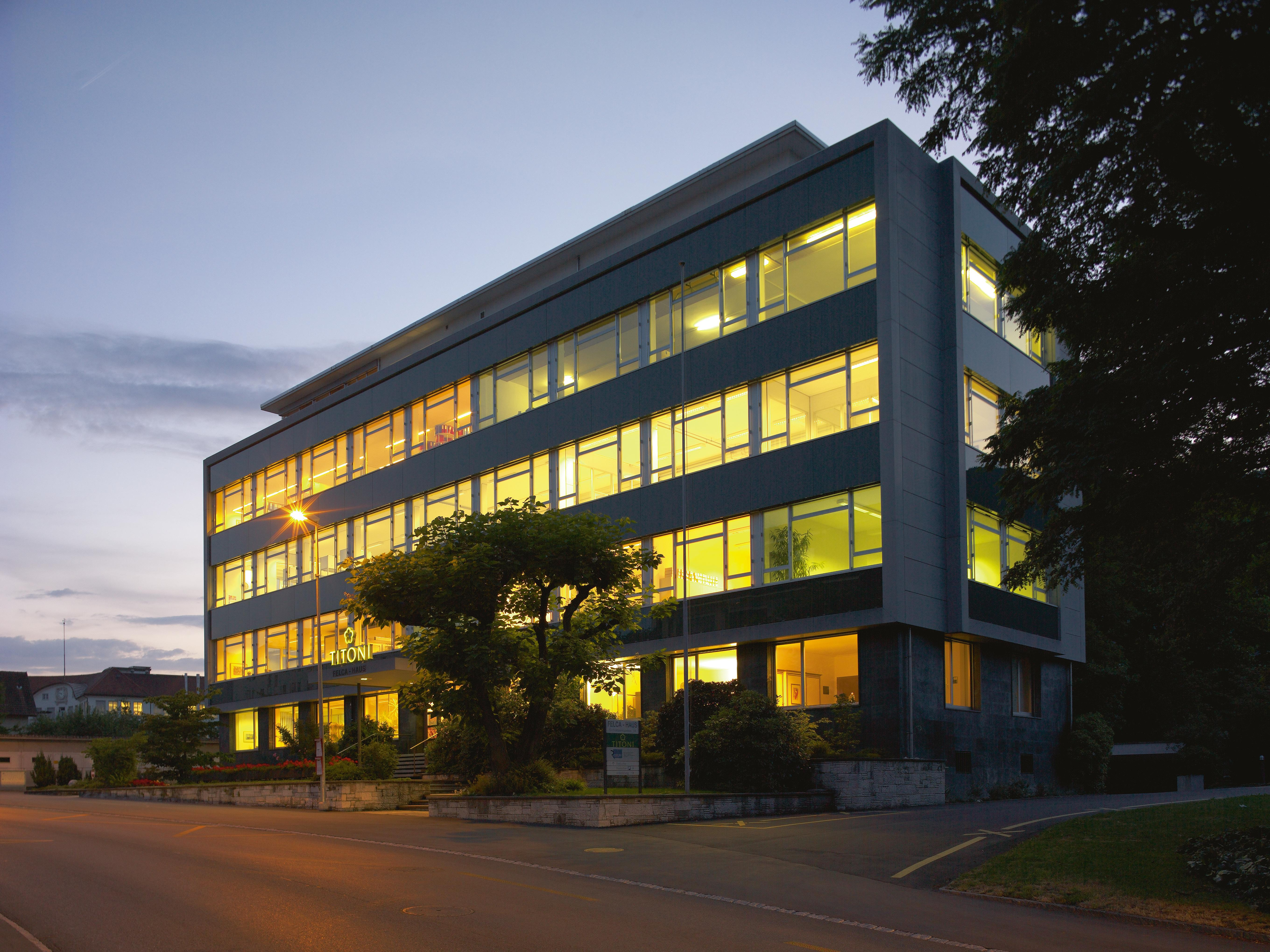
Titoni Ltd. located at Grenchen, Switzerland

Titoni Ltd. is a Swiss watchmaker that was founded in 1919 by Fritz Schluep in the Swiss town of Grenchen under the name Felca Ltd. The company, which is now owned and operated by the third and fourth generation of its founding family, currently employs around 60 people.

== Expansion ==
Chinese sailors bought the watches that Felca was selling in Singapore and Hong Kong. The founder's son, Bruno Schluep, first established contacts with one of the Chinese businessmen, Koh Mui Yew, in 1944.

In 1960 the Chinese State Import Authority ordered Titoni watches after Felca invited a delegation to Switzerland. The company name was soon extended to Felca & Titoni Watches Ltd. and later Titoni Ltd. Felca branded watches continued to be sold in Europe, while the Titoni brand was used in Asia.

== Pricing ==
Titoni manufactures watches in the mid-price range. During China's planned economy rule a maximum price of CHF 80 was prescribed by the communist regime.

== Quality ==
Titoni watches have a reputation for high quality at a reasonable price, and are considered a prestigious status symbol, especially in Asia. During the 1970s, quartz watches were introduced. In response, Titoni opted for a mix of traditional mechanical watches with quartz watches.

== See also ==
- Arcadia Watches
