= Grenchen =

- Municipality
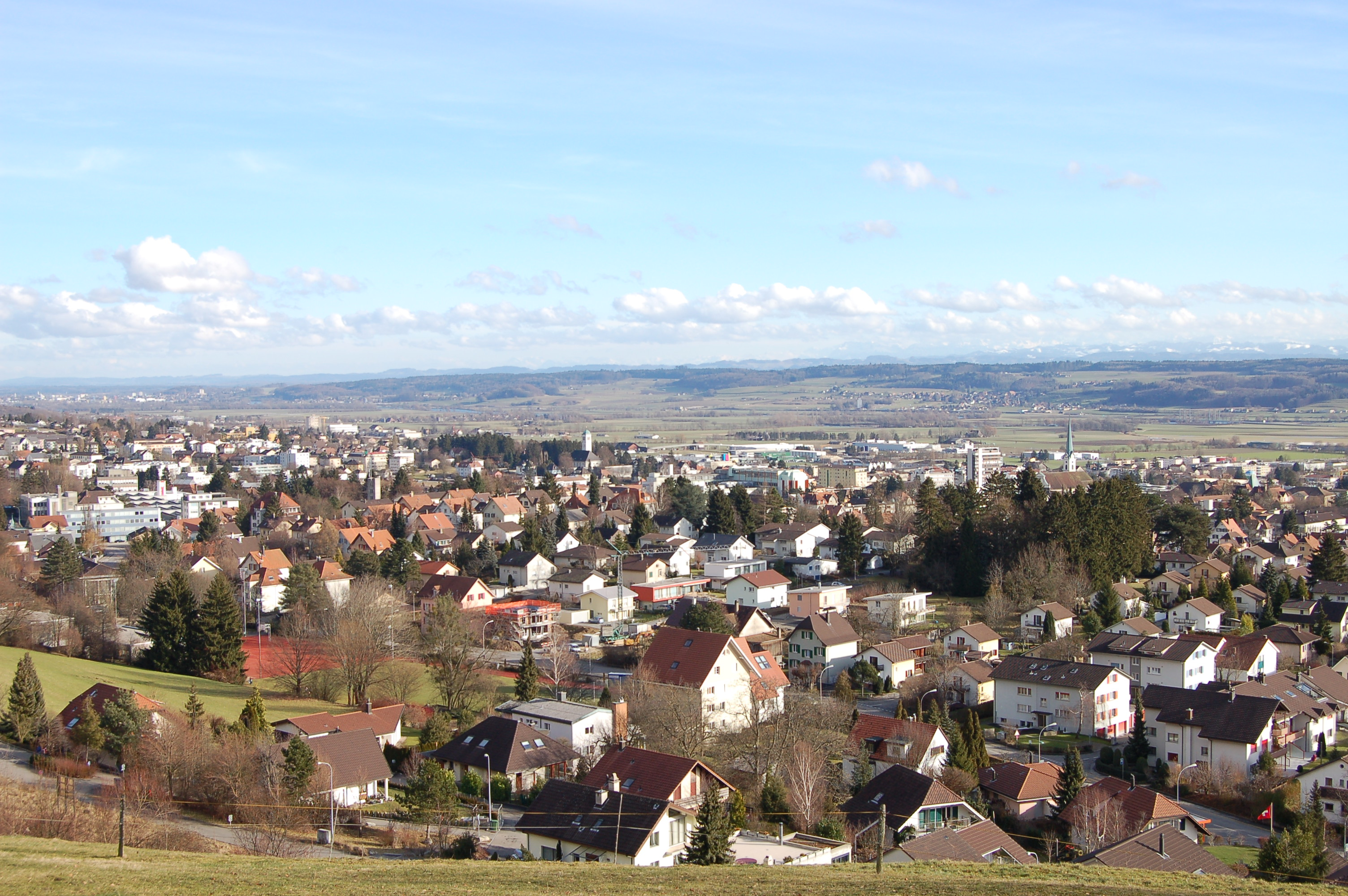
- Grenchen

- Coat of arms
- Location of Grenchen
- Location within Switzerland Location within Canton of Solothurn
- Coordinates: 47°11′26″N 7°23′47″E
- Country: Switzerland
- Canton: Solothurn
- District: Lebern

Government
  - Executive: Gemeinderat with 15 members
  - Mayor: Stadtpräsident (list); François Scheidegger FDP/PRD (as of 2014)

Area
  - Total: 26.01 km^{2} (10.04 sq mi)
- Elevation: 451 m (1,480 ft)

Population (June 2007)
  - Total: 17,577
  - Density: 675.8/km^{2} (1,750/sq mi)
- Time zone: UTC+01:00 (CET)
  - Summer (DST): UTC+02:00 (CEST)
- Postal code: 2540
- SFOS number: 2546
- ISO 3166 code: CH-SO
- Surrounded by: Arch (BE), Bettlach, Büren an der Aare (BE), Court (BE), Lengnau (BE), Romont (BE), Rüti bei Büren (BE), Selzach
- Twin towns: Neckarsulm (Germany), Sélestat (France)
- Website: www.grenchen.ch

Grenchen (Swiss Standard German pronunciation: [ˈɡrɛnçn̩]; French: Granges [ɡʁɑ̃ʒ]) is a municipality in the district of Lebern in the canton of Solothurn in Switzerland.

It is located at the foot of the Jura Mountains between Solothurn and Biel/Bienne, approximately 25 km (16 mi) north of Bern. With over 16,000 inhabitants, it is one of the larger towns of the canton of Solothurn. The city is well known for its watch industry, that has been present for more than 150 years.

Grenchen was the 2008 winner of the Wakker Prize for architectural heritage.

Jura-Sternwarte Grenchen is located at Grenchen.

== History ==
Around 1000 AD, the local barons built a castle on the local cliff that was inhabited for three centuries. The name Grenchen was first documented in 1131 as Granechun. The name comes from the Gallo-Romanic graneca, meaning by the granary.

- 1851: Clock manufacture begins
- 1918: General strike

== Geography ==
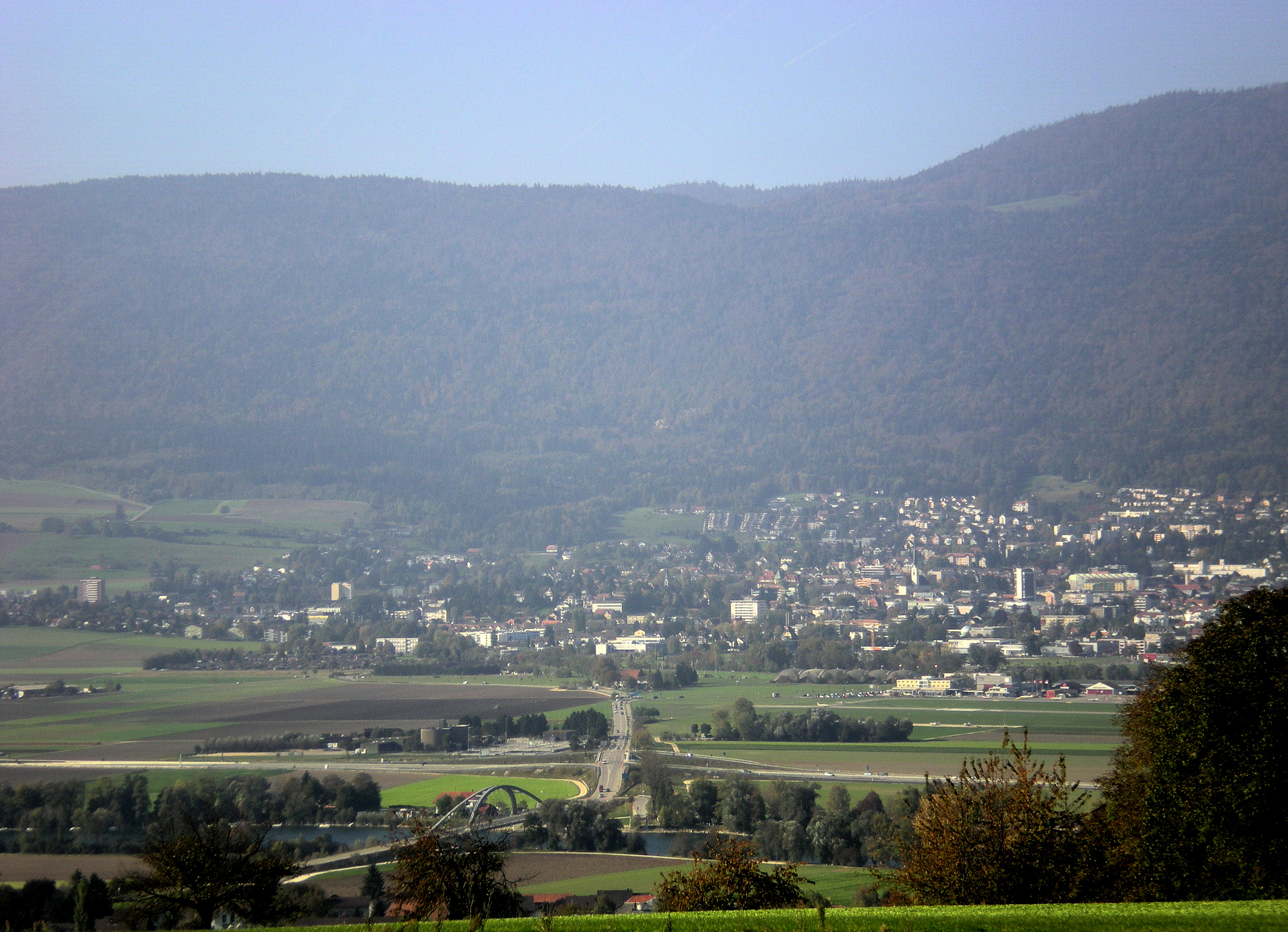
Grenchen and the bridge over the Aare river

Aerial view (1947)

Grenchen has an area, as of 2009, of 26.01 square kilometers (10.04 sq mi). Of this area, 9.85 km^{2} (3.80 sq mi) or 37.9% is used for agricultural purposes, while 10.42 km^{2} (4.02 sq mi) or 40.1% is forested. Of the rest of the land, 5.39 km^{2} (2.08 sq mi) or 20.7% is settled (buildings or roads), 0.34 km^{2} (0.13 sq mi) or 1.3% is either rivers or lakes and 0.05 km^{2} (12 acres) or 0.2% is unproductive land.

Of the built up area, industrial buildings made up 2.2% of the total area while housing and buildings made up 9.7% and transportation infrastructure made up 6.8%. while parks, green belts and sports fields made up 1.4%. Out of the forested land, 38.5% of the total land area is heavily forested and 1.5% is covered with orchards or small clusters of trees. Of the agricultural land, 25.8% is used for growing crops and 6.0% is pastures and 5.3% is used for alpine pastures. All the water in the municipality is flowing water.

The municipality is the capital of the Lebern District. It is the second largest city in the Canton of Solothurn. The municipality stretches from the hamlet of Staad along the Aare river at an elevation of 430 m (1,410 ft) to the first mountain range of the Jura Mountains, the Oberer Grenchenberg at 1,348 m (4,423 ft).

== Coat of arms ==
The blazon of the municipal coat of arms is Gules a Ploughshare Argent.

== Demographics ==
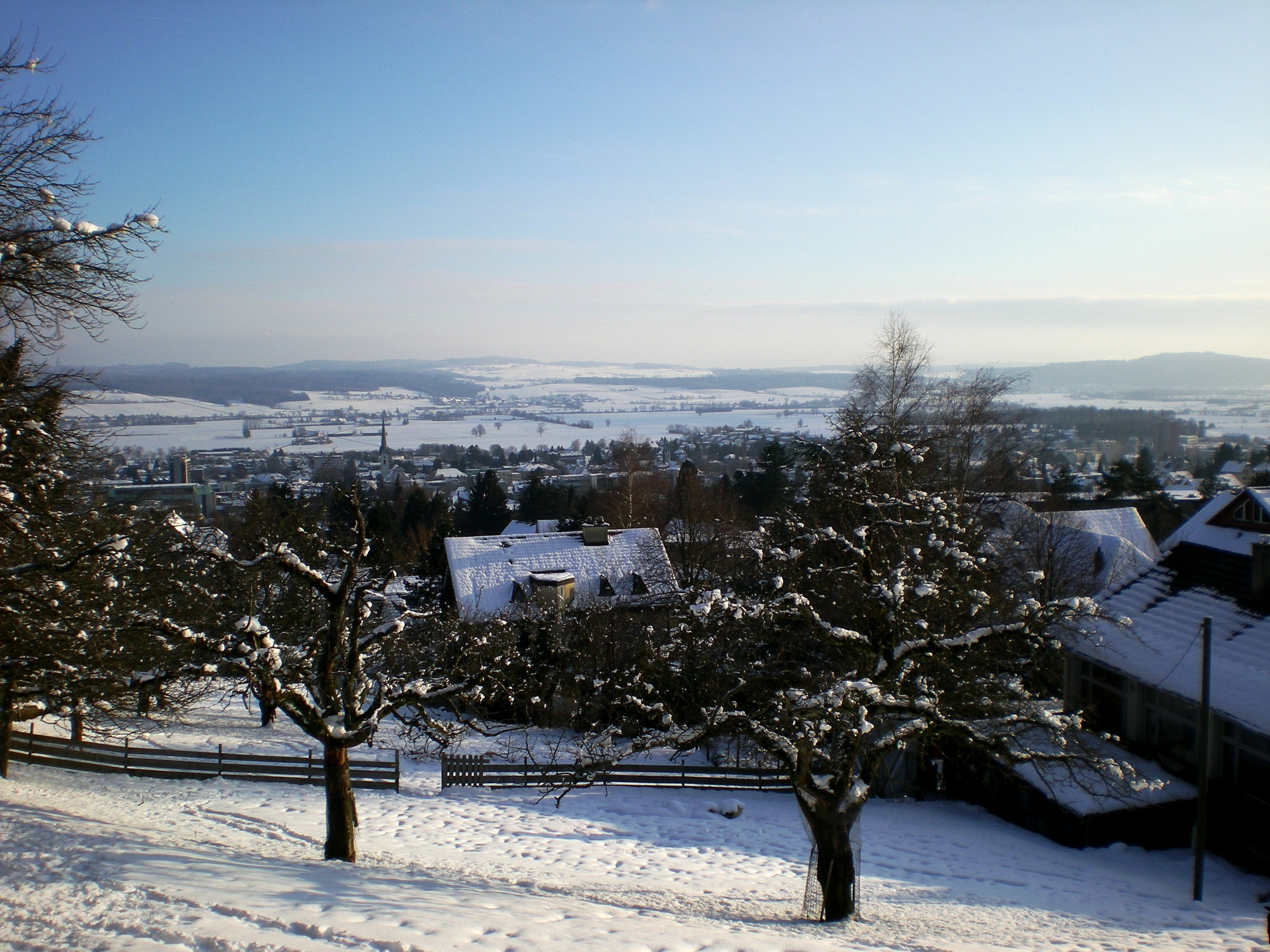
View of Grenchen from a local hilltop church

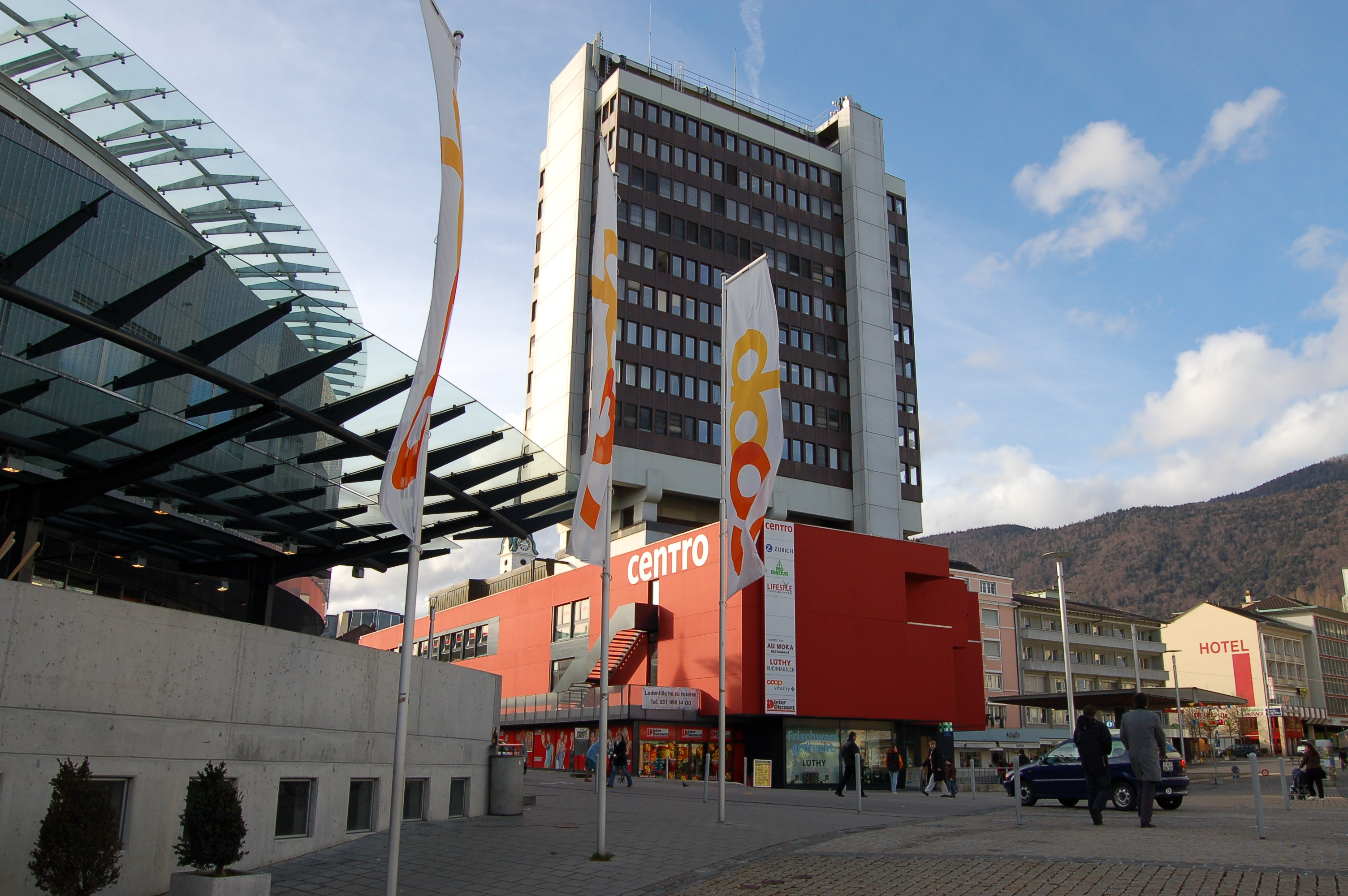
Grenchen town center

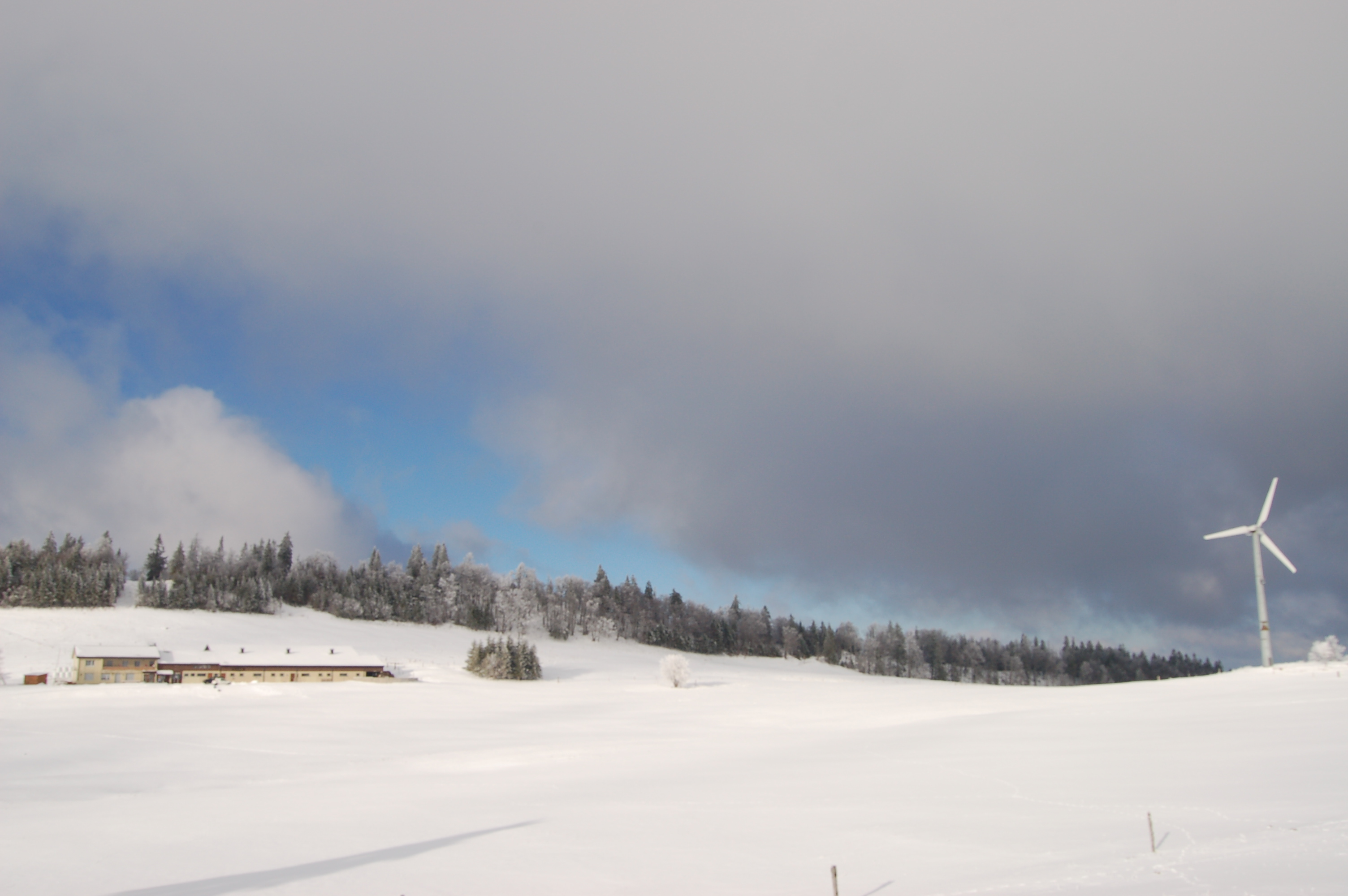
Windmill outside Grenchen

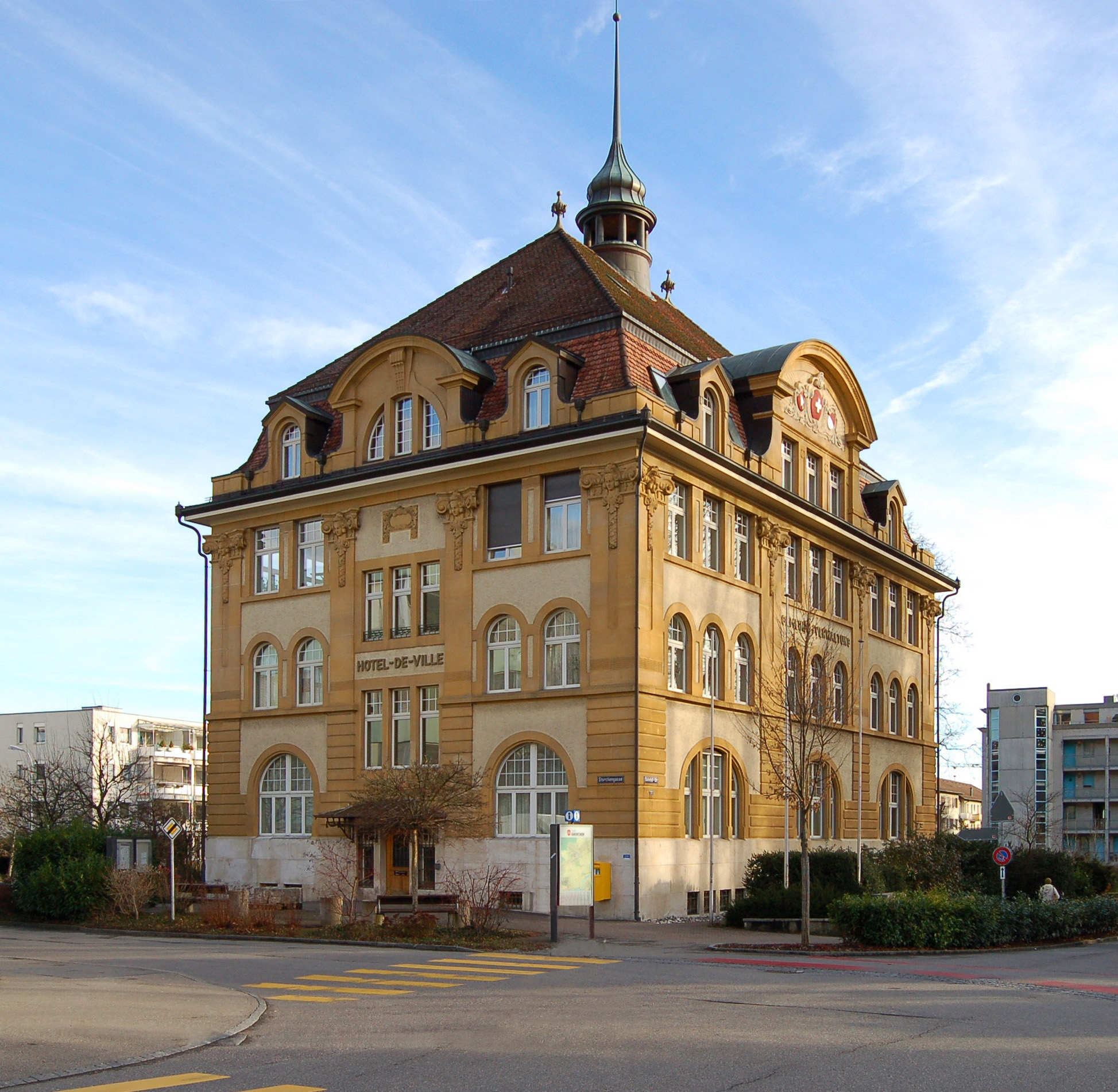
Town hall of Grenchen

Grenchen has a population (as of December 2020) of 17,577. As of 2008, 28.7% of the population are resident foreign nationals. Over the last 10 years (1999–2009) the population has changed at a rate of -1.3%.

Most of the population (as of 2000) speaks German (13,033 or 81.8%), with Italian being second most common (1,022 or 6.4%) and French being third (460 or 2.9%). There are 16 people who speak Romansh.

As of 2008, the gender distribution of the population was 49.2% male and 50.8% female. The population was made up of 5,328 Swiss men (33.3% of the population) and 2,547 (15.9%) non-Swiss men. There were 5,845 Swiss women (36.5%) and 2,289 (14.3%) non-Swiss women. Of the population in the municipality 5,606 or about 35.2% were born in Grenchen and lived there in 2000. There were 2,017 or 12.7% who were born in the same canton, while 4,258 or 26.7% were born somewhere else in Switzerland, and 3,433 or 21.5% were born outside of Switzerland.

In 2008, there were 75 live births to Swiss citizens and 47 births to non-Swiss citizens. In the same time span, there were 167 deaths of Swiss citizens and 10 non-Swiss citizen deaths. Ignoring immigration and emigration, the population of Swiss citizens decreased by 92 while the foreign population increased by 37. There were 21 Swiss men and 16 Swiss women who immigrated back to Switzerland. At the same time, there were 103 non-Swiss men and 59 non-Swiss women who immigrated from another country to Switzerland. The total Swiss population change in 2008 (from all sources, including moves across municipal borders) was a decrease of 20 and the non-Swiss population increased by 190 people. This represents a population growth rate of 1.1%.

The age distribution as of 2000 in Grenchen was as follows: 942 children or 5.9% of the population were between 0 and 6 years old and 2,291 teenagers or 14.4% were between 7 and 19. Of the adult population, 838 people or 5.3% of the population were between 20 and 24 years old. 4,463 people or 28.0% were between 25 and 44, and 4,000 people or 25.1% were between 45 and 64. The senior population distribution was 2,551 people or 16.0% of the population was between 65 and 79 years old and there were 853 people or 5.4% who were over 80.

As of 2000, there were 5,771 people who were single and never married in the municipality. There were 7,679 married individuals, 1,264 widows or widowers and 1,224 individuals who were divorced.

As of 2000, there were 7,409 private households in the municipality, and an average of 2.1 persons per household. There were 2,910 households that consisted of only one person and 352 households with five or more people. Out of a total of 7,532 households that answered this question, 38.6% were households made up of just one person and there were 55 adults who lived with their parents. Of the rest of the households, there were 2,275 married couples without children and 1,741 married couples with children. There were 355 single parents with a child or children. There were 73 households that were made up of unrelated people and 123 households that were made up of some sort of institution or another form of collective housing.

In 2000, there were 1,336 single family homes (or 48.4% of the total) out of a total of 2,763 inhabited buildings. There were 940 multi-family buildings (34.0%), along with 310 multi-purpose buildings that were mostly used for housing (11.2%) and 177 other use buildings (commercial or industrial) that also had some housing (6.4%). Of the single family homes, 67 were built before 1919, while 187 were built between 1990 and 2000. The greatest number of single family homes (388) were built between 1946 and 1960.

In 2000, there were 8,639 apartments in the municipality. The most common apartment size was three rooms of which there were 2,925. There were 429 single room apartments and 1,631 apartments with five or more rooms. Of these apartments, a total of 7,267 apartments (84.1% of the total) were permanently occupied, while 584 apartments (6.8%) were seasonally occupied and 788 apartments (9.1%) were empty. As of 2009, the construction rate of new housing units was 0.9 new units per 1000 residents.

As of 2003, the average price to rent an apartment in Grenchen was 862.63 Swiss francs (CHF) per month (US$690, £390, €550 approx. exchange rate from 2003). The average rate for a one-room apartment was 571.19 CHF (US$460, £260, €370), a two-room apartment was about 637.30 CHF (US$510, £290, €410), a three-room apartment was about 776.90 CHF (US$620, £350, €500) and a six or more room apartment cost an average of 1477.07 CHF (US$1180, £660, €950). The average apartment price in Grenchen was 77.3% of the national average of 1116 CHF. The vacancy rate for the municipality in 2010 was 2.38%.

The historical population is given in the following chart:

== Sights ==
The entire village of Grenchen is part of the Inventory of Swiss Heritage Sites. The ruins of Burg Grenchen, also known as Bettleschloss, a former hill castle, are located above this village.

== Politics ==
In the 2015 federal election, the most popular party was the SVP which received 32.9% of the vote. The other parties were the SP (22.6%), the FDP (19.5%), the CVP (9.1%), BDP 5.4%, glp 4.8%, Greens 2.9%, and the DPS 1.0%.

== Transport ==
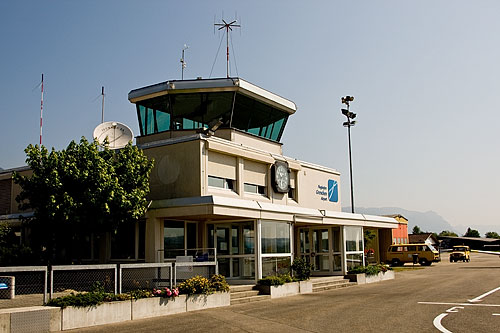
Grenchen Airport tower

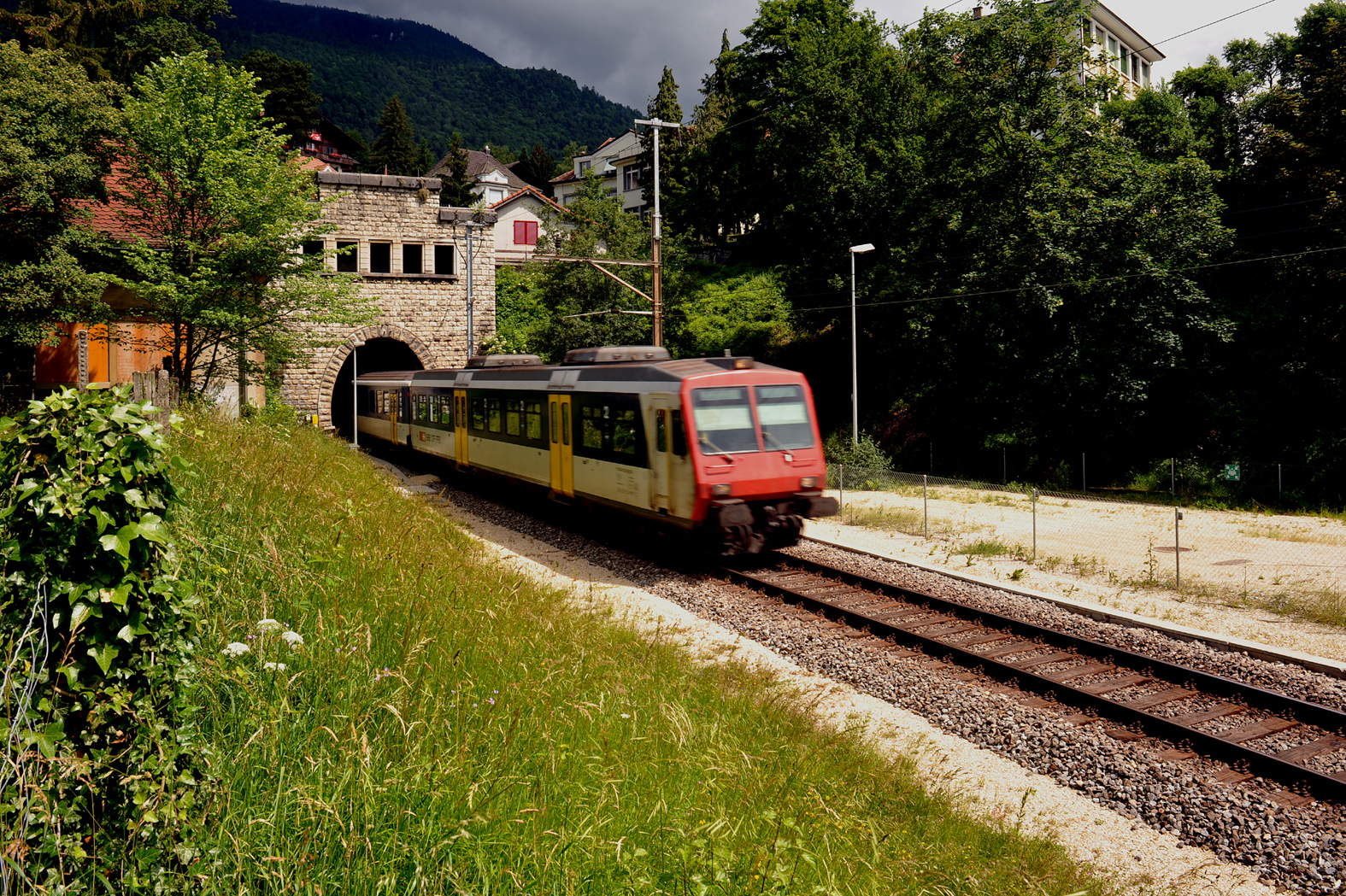
Grenchenberg tunnel

Although Grenchen is a small city, it has its own airport, Grenchen Airfield, with facilities for the transport of goods. It is mostly used by private pilots and parachutists, but also for business travel. The freeway A5 and a connection to Grenchen lie in the vicinity of the airport.

Two railway stations, (Grenchen Nord on the Basel-Biel line and Grenchen Süd on the Geneva-Zürich line), provide an excellent connection to the city on the rail network. The Grenchen Tunnel, an 8.5 km long railroad tunnel that was built between 1911 and 1915, offers a connection between the Swiss Plateau and Delémont/Basel. Construction of the tunnel attracted many foreign workers to Grenchen, coming mostly from Italy.

Grenchen has its own bus company, "BGU". The bus lines connect Grenchen with Bettlach, Lengnau, Büren, Rüti and Selzach.

== Economy ==
As of 2010, Grenchen had an unemployment rate of 5.7%. As of 2008, there were 122 people employed in the primary economic sector and about 36 businesses involved in this sector. 5,906 people were employed in the secondary sector and there were 217 businesses in this sector. 4,197 people were employed in the tertiary sector, with 544 businesses in this sector. There were 7,988 residents of the municipality who were employed in some capacity, of which females made up 43.8% of the workforce.

In 2008, the total number of full-time equivalent jobs was 9,004. The number of jobs in the primary sector was 85, of which 77 were in agriculture and 8 were in forestry or lumber production. The number of jobs in the secondary sector was 5,635 of which 5,189 or (92.1%) were in manufacturing and 367 (6.5%) were in construction. The number of jobs in the tertiary sector was 3,284. In the tertiary sector; 742 or 22.6% were in wholesale or retail sales or the repair of motor vehicles, 188 or 5.7% were in the movement and storage of goods, 236 or 7.2% were in a hotel or restaurant, 61 or 1.9% were in the information industry, 119 or 3.6% were the insurance or financial industry, 211 or 6.4% were technical professionals or scientists, 371 or 11.3% were in education and 910 or 27.7% were in health care.

In 2000, there were 5,261 workers who commuted into the municipality and 3,273 workers who commuted away. The municipality is a net importer of workers, with about 1.6 workers entering the municipality for every one leaving. Of the working population, 13.8% used public transportation to get to work, and 52.8% used a private car.

=== Watch industry ===
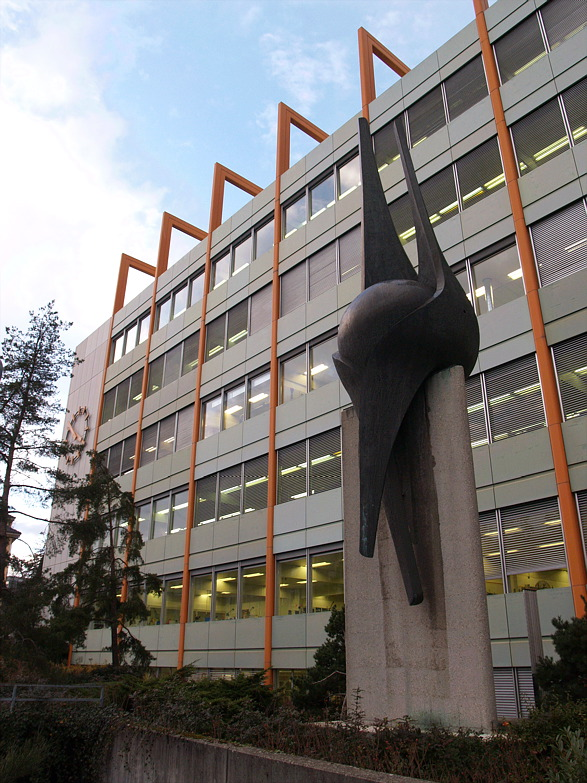
ETA main building in Grenchen

Grenchen has a large traditional watch industry and several famous manufacturers are based in the city:

- Atlantic Watch Production Ltd
- Breitling SA
- Epos
- ETA SA
- Fortis
- Eterna SA
- Nivada
- Orfina
- Titoni Ltd.

== Sport ==
FC Grenchen is the municipality's football club.

Grenchen has a velodrome, Velodrome Suisse. It hosted the 2015 UEC European Track Championships., during which a new world record was set in the Ladies' 500m Time Trials by Anastasiia Voinova of Russia.

== Religion ==
From the 2000 census, 5,654 or 35.5% were Roman Catholic, while 5,754 or 36.1% belonged to the Swiss Reformed Church. Of the rest of the population, there were 154 members of an Orthodox church (or about 0.97% of the population), there were 171 individuals (or about 1.07% of the population) who belonged to the Christian Catholic Church, and there were 284 individuals (or about 1.78% of the population) who belonged to another Christian church. There were 3 individuals (or about 0.02% of the population) who were Jewish, and 1,145 (or about 7.18% of the population) who were Islamic. There were 70 individuals who were Buddhist, 90 individuals who were Hindu and 17 individuals who belonged to another church. 2,019 (or about 12.67% of the population) belonged to no church, are agnostic or atheist, and 577 individuals (or about 3.62% of the population) did not answer the question.

== Education ==
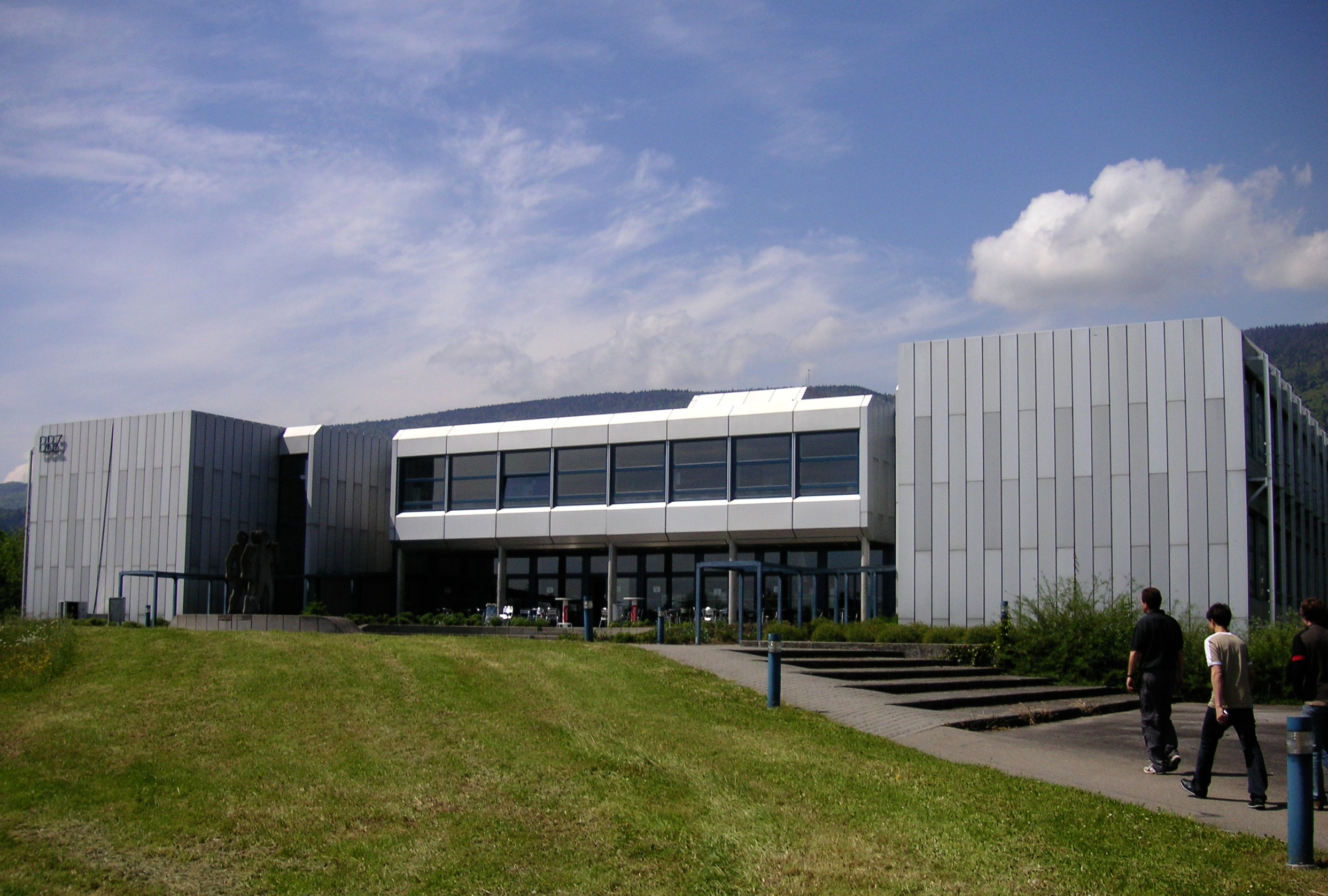
Berufsschule (upper secondary school) in Grenchen

In Grenchen, about 5,773 or (36.2%) of the population have completed non-mandatory upper secondary education, and 1,457 or (9.1%) have completed additional higher education (either university or a Fachhochschule). Of the 1,457 who completed tertiary schooling, 64.2% were Swiss men, 20.9% were Swiss women, 10.1% were non-Swiss men and 4.9% were non-Swiss women.

During the 2010–2011 school year, there were a total of 1,309 students in the Grenchen school system. The education system in the Canton of Solothurn allows young children to attend two years of non-obligatory Kindergarten. During that school year, there were 276 children in kindergarten. The canton's school system requires students to attend six years of primary school, with some of the children attending smaller, specialized classes. In the municipality, there were 699 students in primary school and 108 students in the special, smaller classes. The secondary school program consists of three lower, obligatory years of schooling, followed by three to five years of optional, advanced schools. 226 lower secondary students attend school in Grenchen.

As of 2000, there were 171 students in Grenchen who came from another municipality, while 267 residents attended schools outside the municipality.

Grenchen is home to the Stadtbibliothek Grenchen library. As of 2008, the library had 36,000 books or other media and loaned out 57,000 items. It was open a total of 258 days, with an average of 19 hours per week during that year.

== Notable people ==
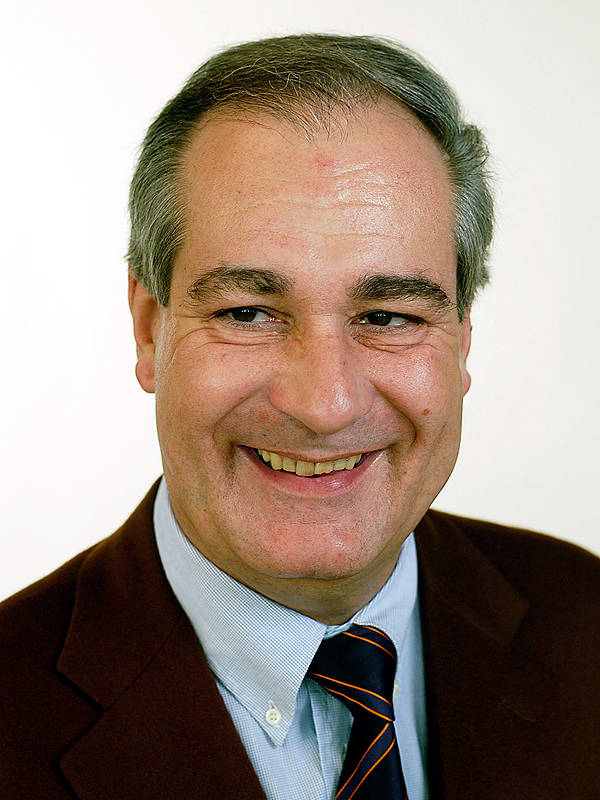
Boris Banga

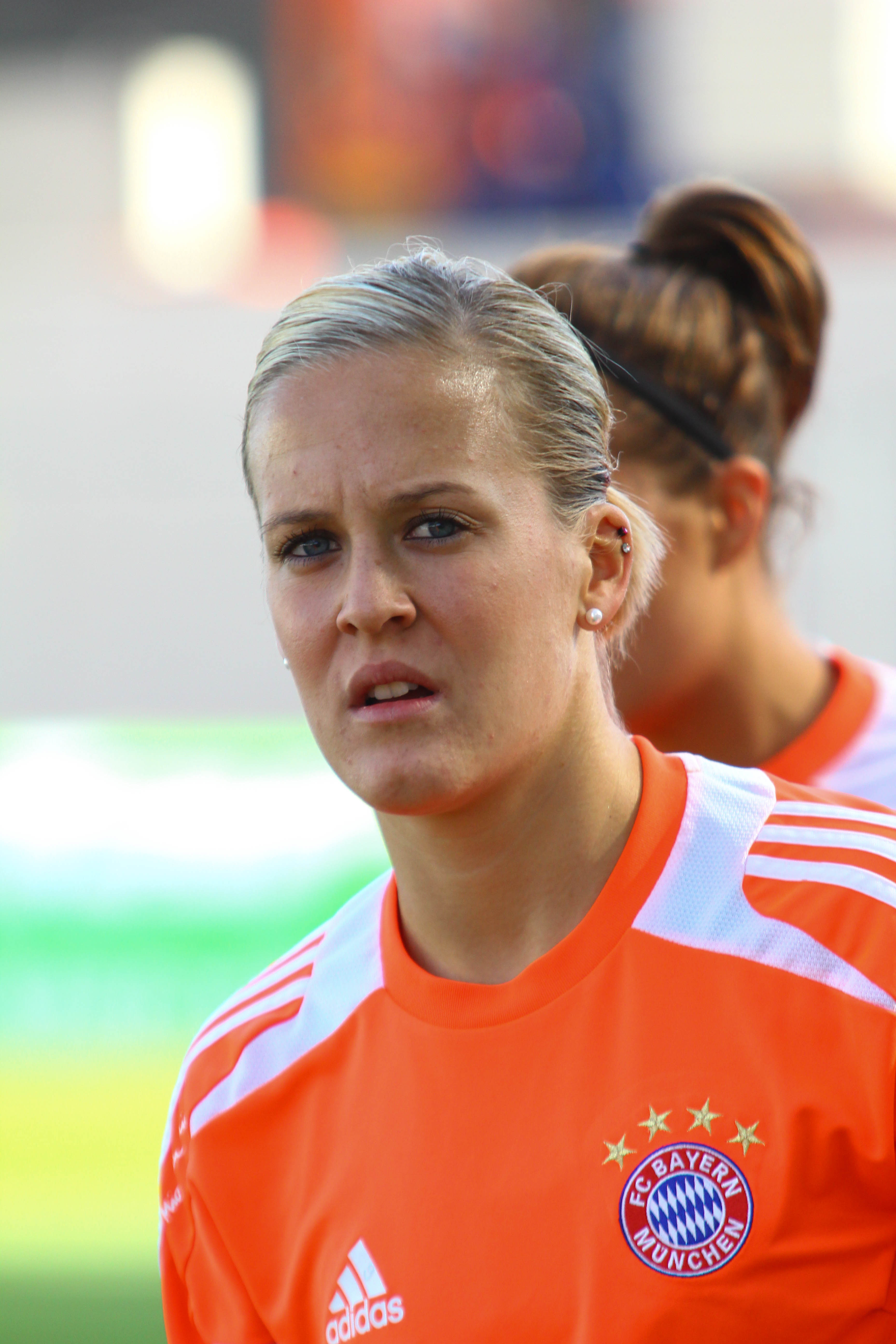
Vanessa Bürki, 2012

- Franz Joseph Hugi (1791–1855), Roman Catholic priest, geologist and alpinist, born in Grenchen
- Giuseppe Mazzini (1805–1872), fighter for the independence of Italy, took refuge in Grenchen 1835-1836.
- Hermann Obrecht (1882–1940), Federal Councilor from 1935 to 1940
- Yehudi Menuhin (1916–1999), conductor and violinist, honorary citizen of Grenchen
- Ernst Thomke (born 1939), inventor of the Swatch watch
- Boris Banga (born 1949), Mayor of Grenchen 1991–2013, former national councilor
- Ruth Lüthi (born 1947), politician and academic
- Alain Auderset (born 1968), author of Christian comics albums

=== Sport ===
- Serge Muhmenthaler (born 1953), retired football player and referee
- Ronnie Durrenmatt (born 1979), slalom canoeist, competed at the 2004 Summer Olympics
- Silvan Aegerter (born 1980), footballer, 280 club caps
- Marco Wölfli (born 1982), footballer, 360 club caps
- Vanessa Bürki (born 1986), Swiss footballer of the year 2006, 79 games for the Switzerland women's national football team
- Haris Tabaković (born 1994), Swiss footballer of Bosnian descent
