= Jura-Sternwarte Grenchen =

- Alternative names: Jura Observatory Grenchen
- Organization: Stiftung Jura-Sternwarte
- Location: Grenchen, Canton of Solothurn, Switzerland.
- Coordinates: 47°13′17.7″N 07°22′53.0″E
- Altitude: 1,300 m (4,300 ft)
- Established: 1976
- Website: www.jurasternwarte.ch

Jura-Sternwarte Grenchen (Jura Observatory Grenchen) is an astronomical observatory owned and operated by Stiftung Jura-Sternwarte. Built in 1976, it is located near Grenchen in the Canton of Solothurn, Switzerland.
