= Burg Grenchen =

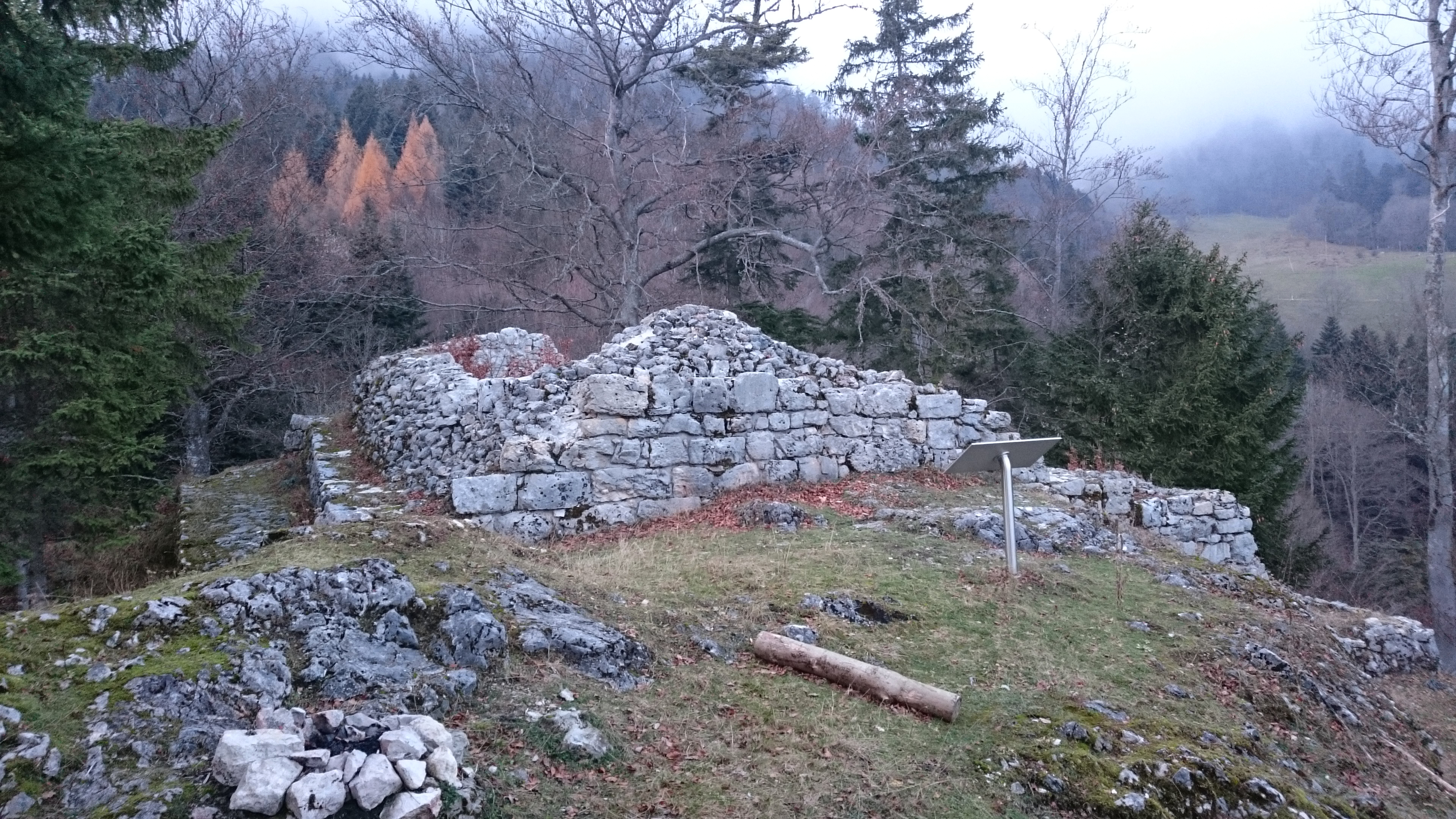
- Ruins of the Burg Grenchen from the 12th century

- Location within Switzerland

General information
- Classification: Ruin of a hill castle
- Location: Bettlach, Switzerland
- Coordinates: 47.21913°N 7.403647°E

The Burg Grenchen, also known as Bettleschloss, was a hill castle located above the present-day municipalities of Grenchen and Bettlach in the Canton of Solothurn, Switzerland. It is one of the early clearing castles in the Jura Mountains in Switzerland.

== History ==
Originally, the castle consisted of a wooden fort and a rampart. Around the year 1150, it became a stone castle with a tower house and several outbuildings. The main castle is situated on the Schlossfluh, the lower castle on the Hofacherfluh. By the year 1200, the outbuildings were enlarged and an oven was integrated. The castle was inhabited until the early 14th century.

In 1583, when a prison tower was to be built in Grenchen, the Solothurn Council gave clearance for the ruins of the castle to be used as a stone quarry.

In 1930, Germann Leimer discovered a treasure trove from the 14th century at the castle area. The trove contained 300 silver planchets (prefabricated coins), some coins, a small silver bar and a bar iron. In the years 1959 and 1961, the Museumsgesellschaft Grenchen had initiated the archaeological research of the castle. After the excavations, the masonry of the ruin was restored and preserved. Since then, the finds of the excavations and a model of the castle have been exhibited in the Kultur-Historisches Museum Grenchen.

In 2011, the Historischer Verein Bettlach and the Museumsgesellschaft Grenchen carried out an Action day: Burg Grenchen - Bettleschloss. The ruins were freed from the growing vegetation, the walls were repaired, and the castle was renewed.

The castle's remains are now open to hikers via a trailhead beginning near Bettlach.
