= List of mayors of Grenchen =

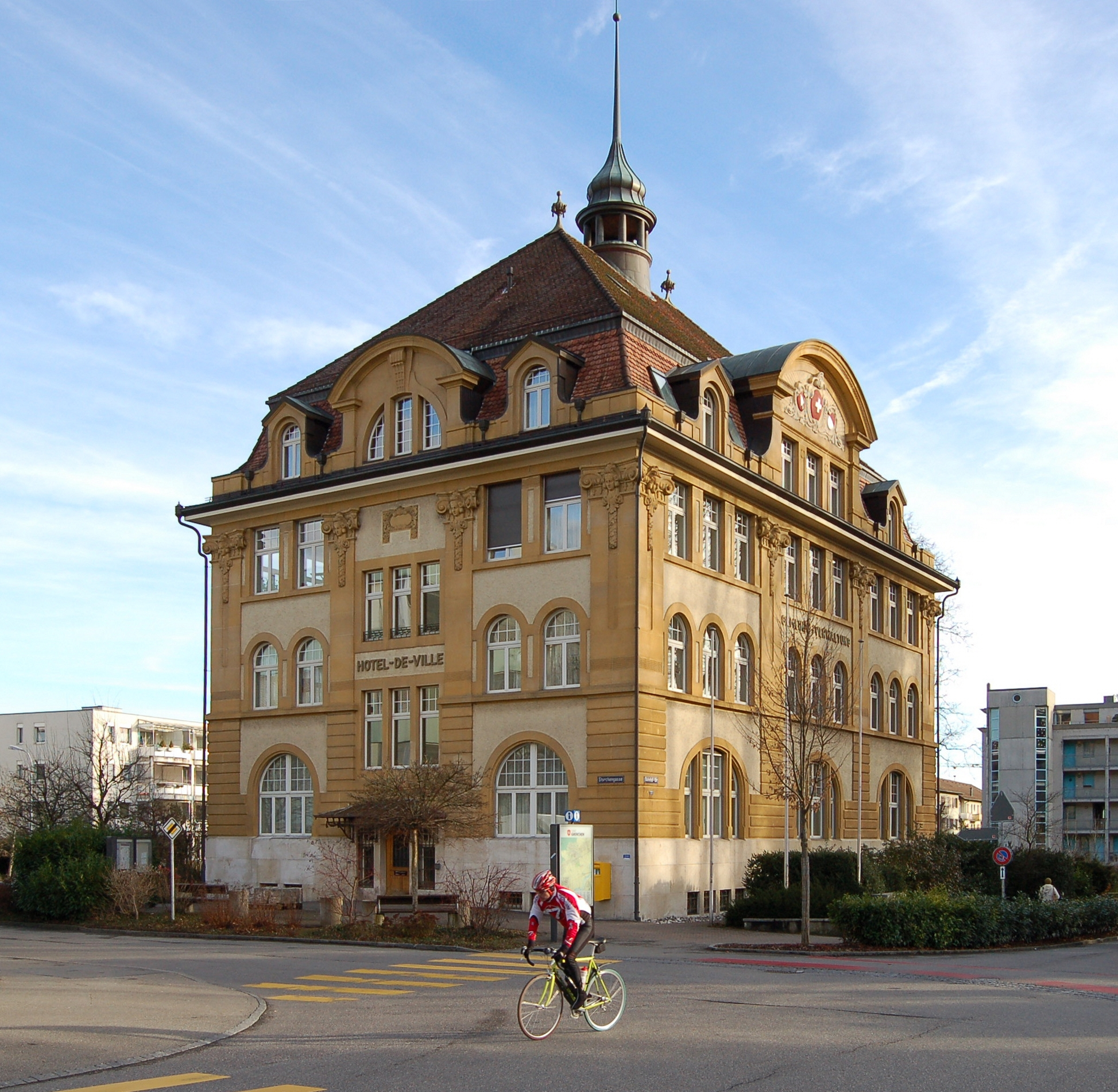
Stadthaus, Grenchen

Coat of arms of Grenchen

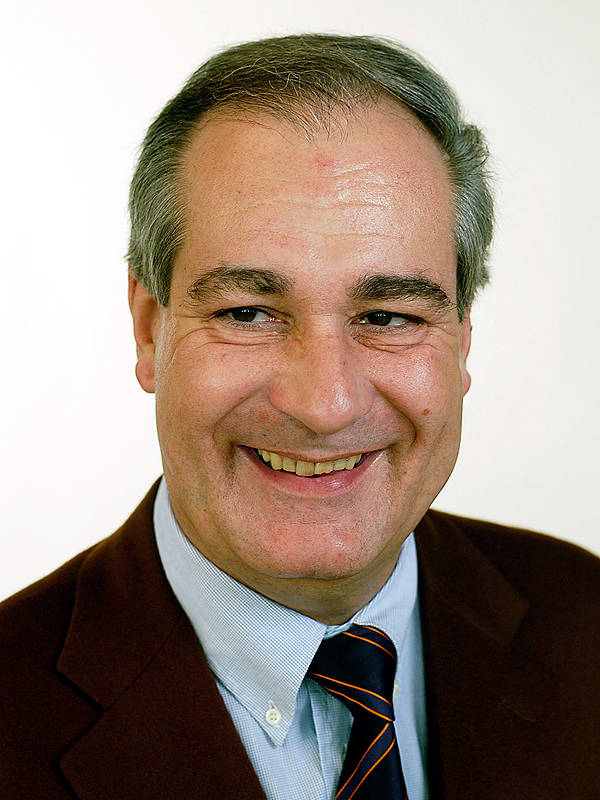
Boris Banga, mayor 1991–2013

This is a list of mayors of Grenchen, Switzerland. The Stadtpräsident (earlier: Stadtammann) chairs the Gemeinderat, the executive of Grenchen/Granges.

Mayor (Stadtpräsident/Stadtammann) of Grenchen
Term	Mayor	Lifespan	Party	Notes
1818–1830	Euseb Gast			
1830–1835	Josef Girard		Liberals	
1835–1836	Franz Schilt			
1836–1838	Marx Schürer			
1838–1839	Urs Güggi			
1840–1842	Euseb Gast			
1842–1853	Franz Schilt			
1853–1856	Josef Luterbacher			
1856–1859	Euseb Vogt	(1829–1912)		
1859–1866	Franz Schilt			
1866–1899	Euseb Vogt	(1829–1912)		
1899–1912	Robert Luterbacher	(1846–1912)	SPS/PSS	
1913–1919	Hermann Guldimann	(1865–1919)	SPS/PSS	
1919–1933	Arthur Stämpfli		SPS/PSS	
1933–1960	Adolf Furrer	(1897–1978)	SPS/PSS	
1960–1990	Eduard Rothen	(1925–2007)	SPS/PSS	
1991–2013	Boris Banga	(born 1949)	SPS/PSS	
2014–present	François Scheidegger		FDP	
