= Boris Banga =

Swiss politician

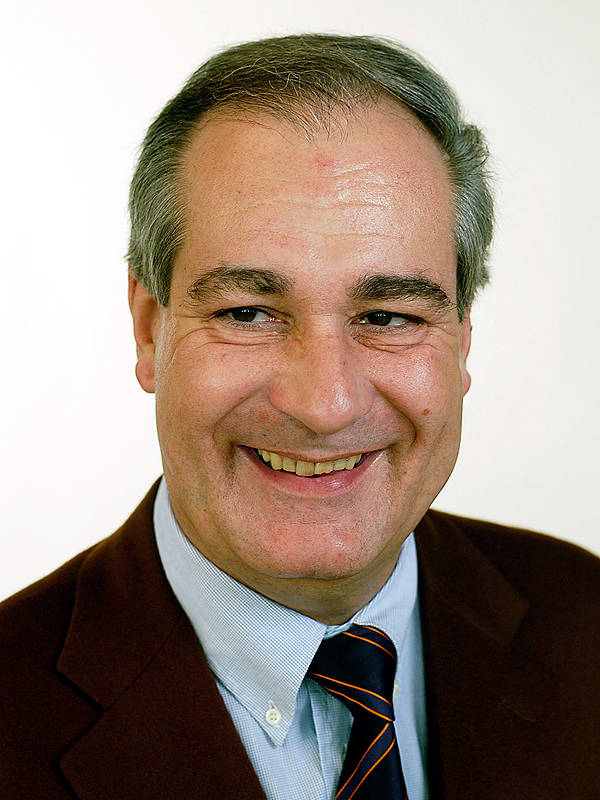

Mayor of Grenchen
- In office 1 January 1991 – 2013
- Preceded by: Eduard Rothen
- Succeeded by: François Scheidegger

Personal details
- Born: 9 August 1949 (age 76) Basel, Switzerland
- Party: Social Democratic Party of Switzerland
- Occupation: Politician
- Website: www.banga.ch/

Boris Banga (born 9 August 1949) is a Swiss politician and longtime mayor of Grenchen (1991–2013). Banga is a member of the Social Democratic Party of Switzerland.
