= Arcadia Watches =

Swiss brand of luxury watches

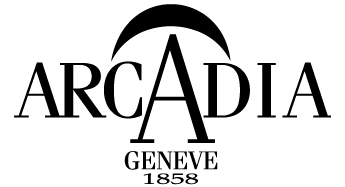
- Type: Private
- Industry: Watch manufacturing
- Founded: Fleurier, Switzerland (1858)
- Founder: Claude Sanz
- Headquarters: Geneva, Switzerland
- Key people: Richard Baldwin (CEO)
- Products: Wrist watches

Arcadia Watches is a Swiss brand of luxury watches established in 1858. In 1968, the brand ceased due to a decline caused by the introduction of quartz movements. It was relaunched in 2007 by Claude Sanz, owner and President of Maison Bunter based in Geneva, and the first new Arcadia watch, the AC01, entered the market in 2010.

== History ==
The Arcadia brand originated in Fleurier, a small village in Val-de-Travers region of the Canton of Neuchâtel in Switzerland. Watchmaker Jules-Samuel Jequier was born in 1835 in Fleurier and joined Bovet after training as a jewel-cutter and quickly climbed up the company ladder. In 1858, he founded Arcadia and positioned it as the top-of-the-line watchmaker among the five watchmaking brands of the Fleurier Watch Company, a manufacturer established in 1915. The company specialized in jewel cutting and designing watch calibers and had federated watchmaking farmers into working cooperatively with each other. Fleurier Watch Company supplied movements for over a century to many watch brands.

While Arcadia had started off producing movements, it followed several years later with a watch line. Arcadia was in fact one of the earliest brands to sell its watches around the world, including China and South America, and it was an avant-garde brand that became the flagship of the Fleurier Watch Company.

The brand sold watches until 1968, when, like many other mechanical watch companies, the advent of inexpensive quartz models led to its demise.

== Rebirth ==
In 2007, Claude Sanz re-launched the brand. Sanz is the President and owner of the jewellery watch house in Bunter SA, based just outside Geneva. The relaunch of Arcadia has led to it restarting the Flourier Watch Company, which is temporarily based in Geneva with movements assembled there.

== Models ==
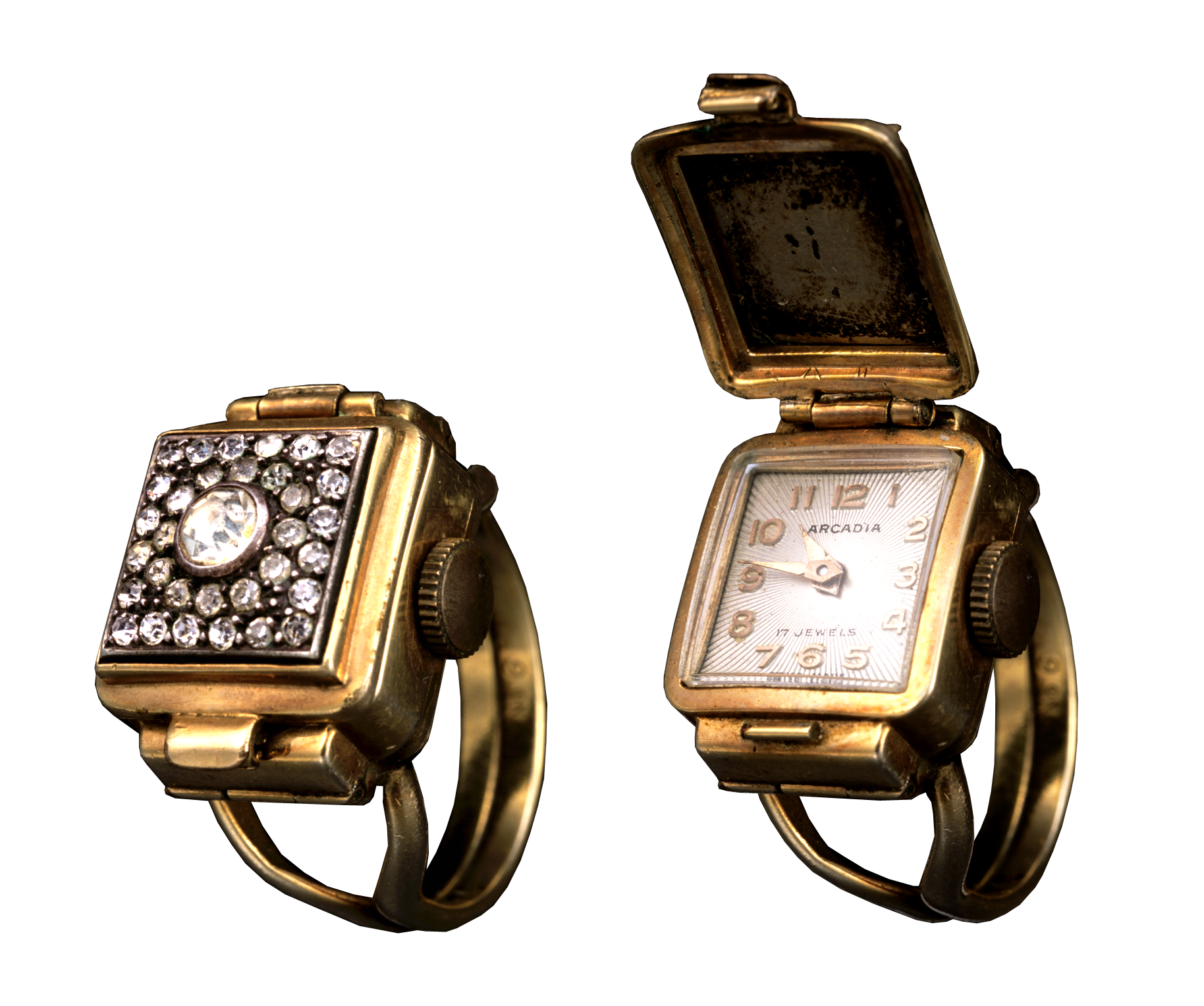
Ring Watch circa 1930

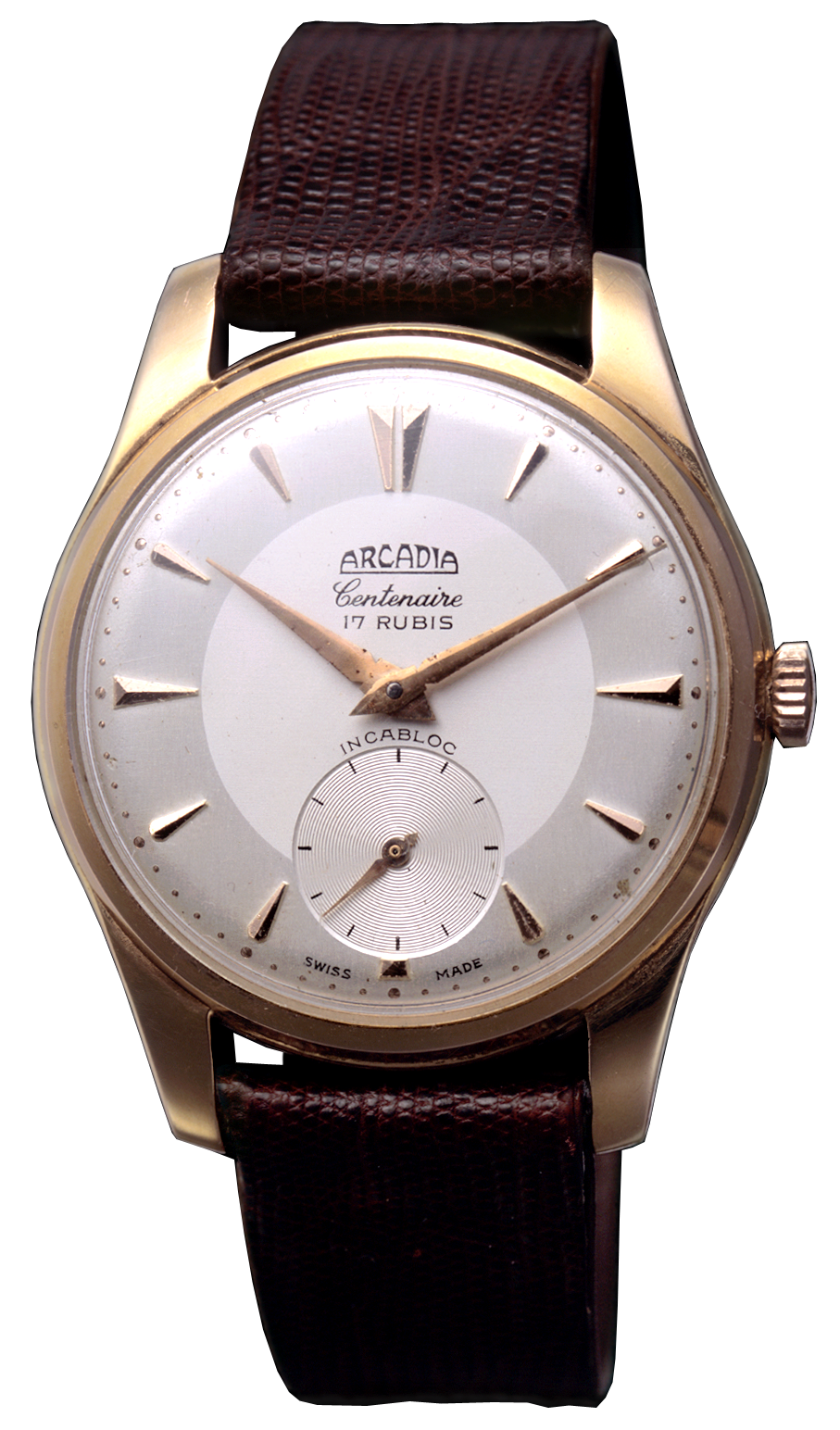
Centenary Watch 1958

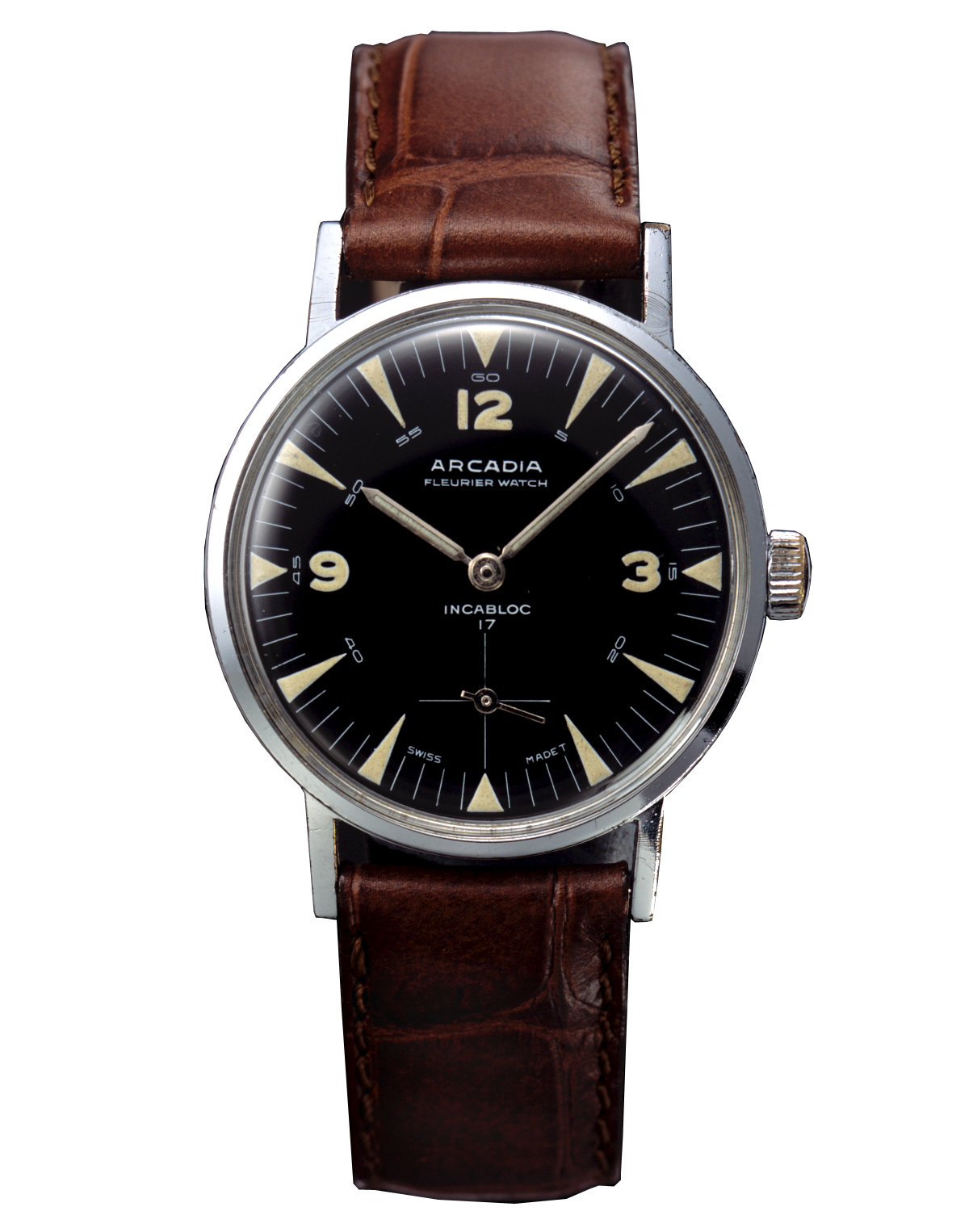
Arcadia Watch circa 1950

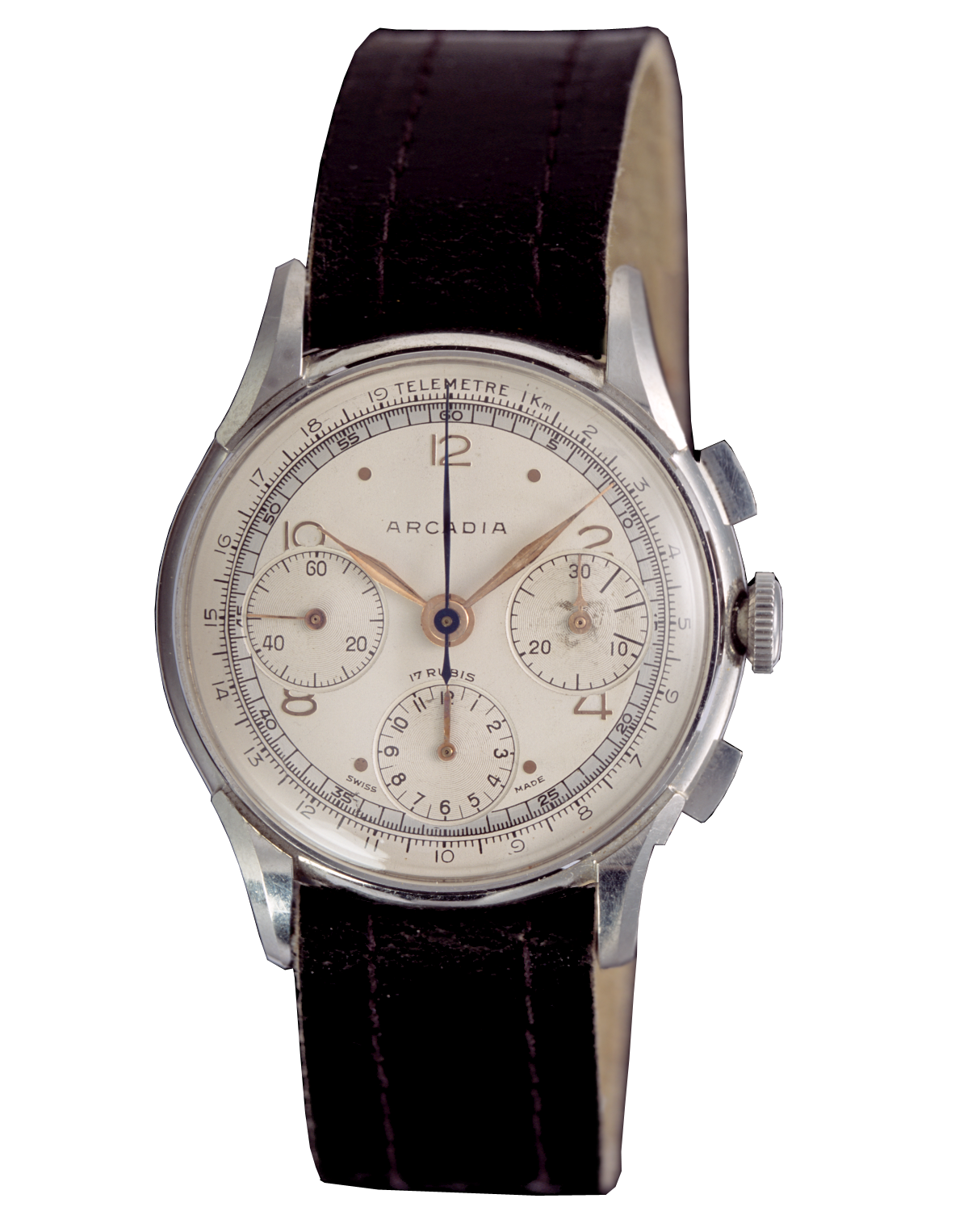
Arcadia Watch circa 1960

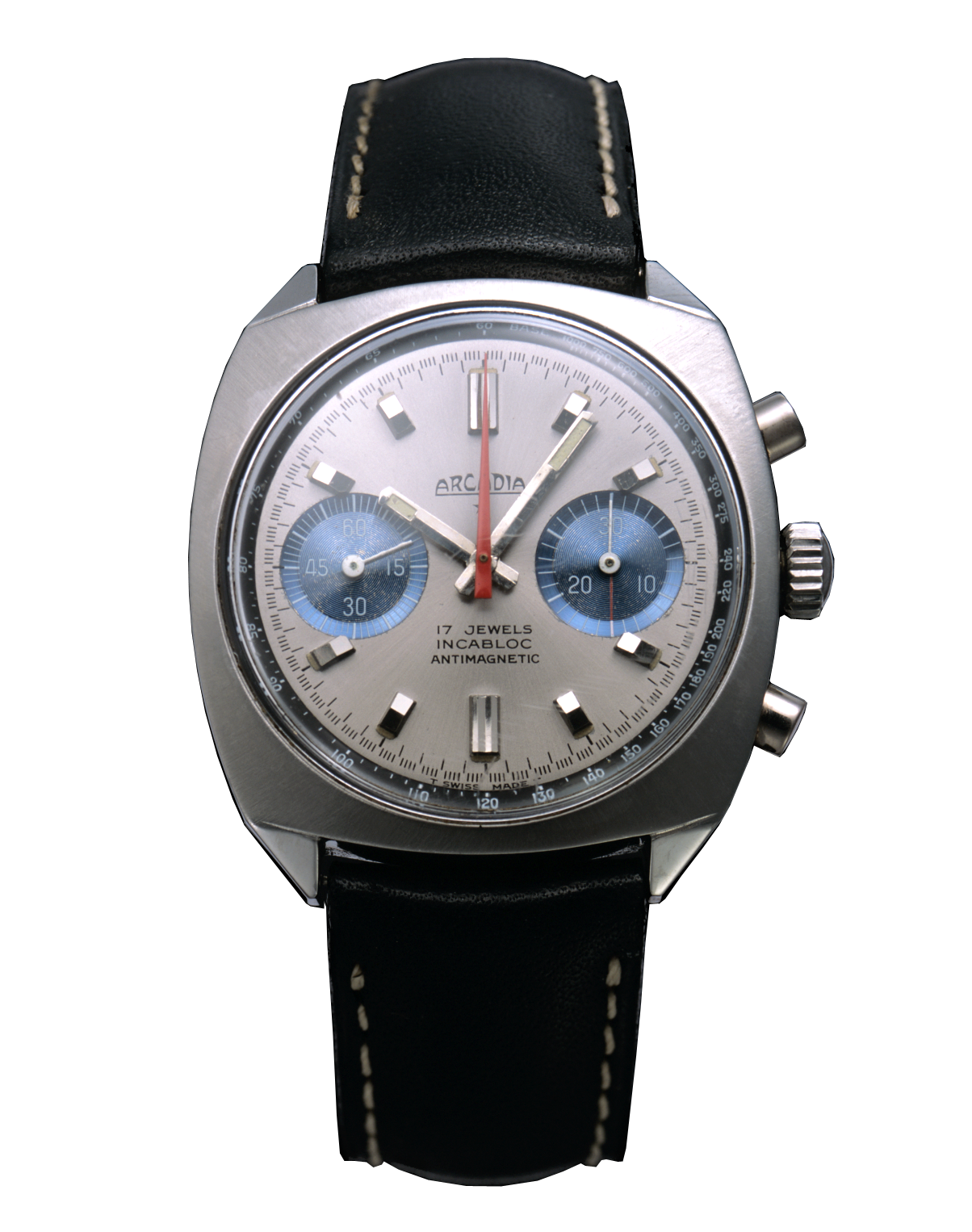
Arcadia Watch circa 1966
