= Grenchen Airport =

Grenchen Airport Flughafen Grenchen
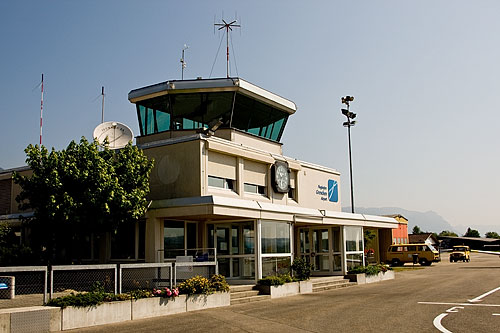
- IATA: none; ICAO: LSZG

Summary
- Airport type: Public
- Operator: Regionalflugplatz Jura-Grenchen AG
- Serves: Grenchen, Switzerland
- Elevation AMSL: 1,411 ft (430 m)
- Coordinates: 47°10′53″N 007°25′01″E
- Website: airport-grenchen.ch
- Interactive map of Grenchen Airport

Runways
Direction	Length		Surface
Direction	m	ft	Surface
06C/24C	1,000	3,281	Asphalt
06R/24L	700	2,297	Grass
06L/24R	500	1,640	Grass

Statistics (2008)
- Passengers: 50,100
- Aircraft movements: 75,000

Grenchen Airport (Note: German: Flughafen Grenchen, French: Aéroport de Granges, Italian: Aeroporto di Grenchen) (ICAO: LSZG) is an airport serving Grenchen, a municipality in the district of Lebern in the canton of Solothurn in Switzerland.

== Facilities ==
The aerodrome resides at an elevation of 1,411 feet (430 m) above mean sea level. It has one asphalt paved runway designated 06C/24C which measures 1,000 by 23 metres (3,281 ft × 75 ft) and two grass runways: 06R/24L is 700 by 20 metres (2,297 ft × 66 ft) and 06L/24R is 500 by 30 metres (1,640 ft × 98 ft).

== See also ==
- Transport in Switzerland
