= List of watchmakers =

This chronological list of famous watchmakers is a list of those who influenced the development of horology or gained status by their creations. The list is sorted by the lifetimes of the watchmakers.

== Until 1400 ==
- Ktesibios (3rd century BC), Greek engineer, clepsydra with hands and dial.
- Zhang Heng (78–139), Chinese mathematician and inventor, clepsydra with extra reservoir.
- Yi Xing (683–727), Chinese Buddhist and engineer, astronomical clock.
- Zhang Sixun (10th century AD), Chinese engineer, clepsydra with water wheel.
- Su Song (11th century AD), Chinese engineer, clepsydra with water wheel and ratchet.
- Richard of Wallingford (1292–1336), English mathematician, astronomer and abbot, Wallingford, Oxfordshire, astronomical clock of Abbey St Albans.
- Jacopo de Dondi (1293–1359), Italian astronomer and clockmaker, Padua, astronomical clock of Palazzo del Capitanio.
- Giovanni de Dondi (1318–1389), Italian savant and professor, Milan, astrarium.
- Nikolaus Lilienfeld (1350/1365–1418/1435), German clockmaker and engineer, Rostock, astronomical clock of the St. Nicholas' Church in Stralsund.
- Mikuláš z Kadaně (1350–1420), Czech clockmaker and mechanic, Prague, Prague astronomical clock.
- Lazar the Serb (mid 14th century–after 1404), Serbian Orthodox monk-scribe and horologist who invented and built the first mechanical public clock in Russia in 1404.

== 1400–1500 ==
- Peter Henlein (c. 1479–1542), German locksmith, Nürnberg, often considered the inventor of the watch, portable clocks and watches.
- Nicolaus Kratzer (1487–late 1550), German mathematician and astronomer, Munich, royal astronomer of Henry VIII of England, sun dial.
- Kaspar Brunner (?–1561), Swiss mechanic, Bern, Zytglogge.

== 1500–1600 ==
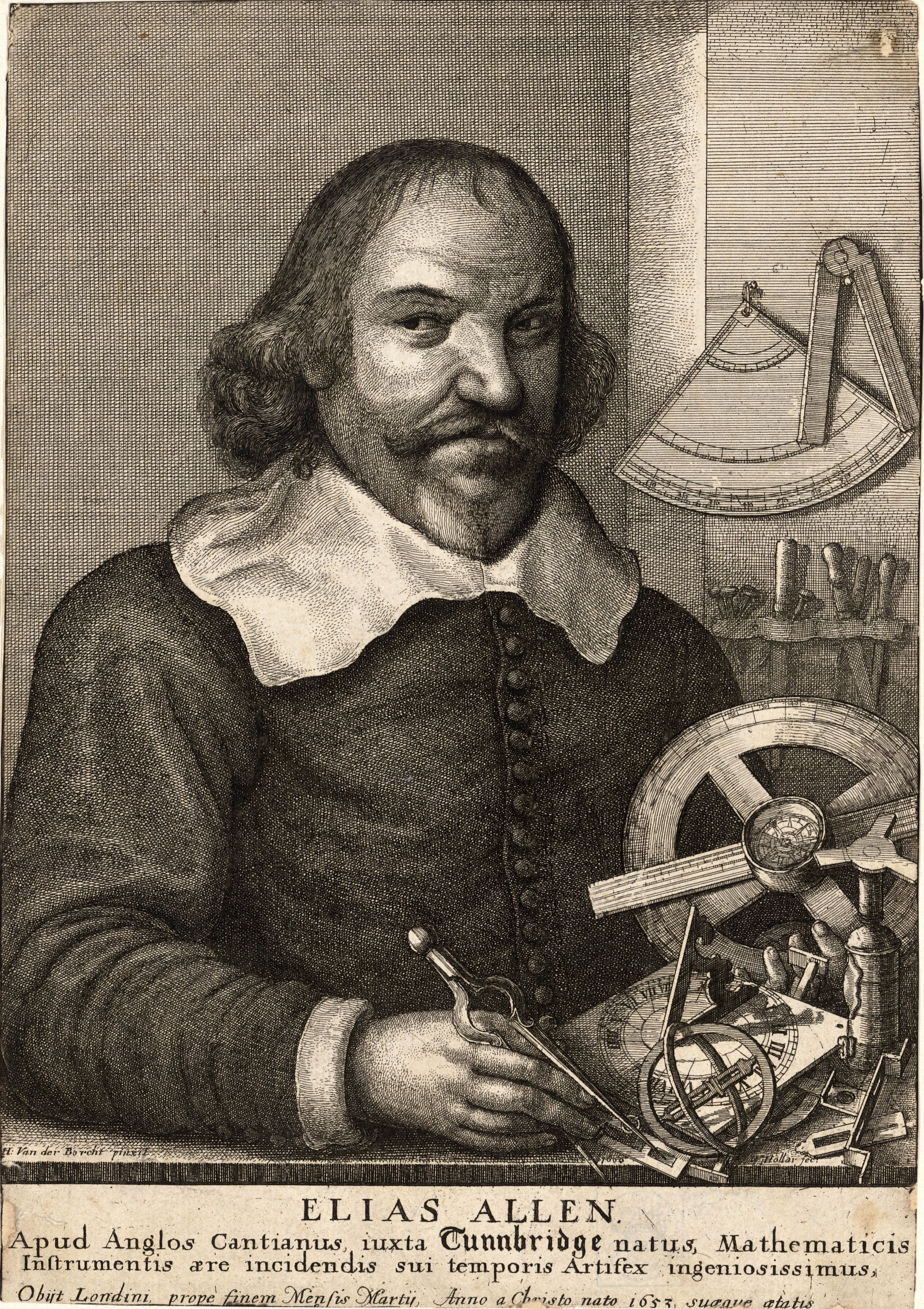
Elias Allen (1588–1653)

- Juanelo Turriano (c. 1500–1585), Spanish clockmaker of the court, Toledo, astronomical clock, restoring the astrarium of Giovanni Dondi.
- Taqi al-Din (1526–1585), Ottoman clockmaker, Istanbul, astronomical clocks, and instruments, alarm clock, pocket watch.
- Bartholomew Newsam (?–1593); English watchmaker, London, royal watchmaker of Elizabeth I.
- Erasmus Habermehl (c. 1538–1606), clockmaker, Prague, astronomical and geodetic instruments.
- Isaac Habrecht (1544–1620), Swiss clockmaker, Schaffhausen, astronomical clock of the Straßburger Münster.
- Jost Bürgi (1552–1632), German clockmaker and instrument builder, Kassel, astronomer.
- Hans Leo Haßler (1564–1612), German composer and clockmaker, Nürnberg. music boxes.
- David Ramsey (c. 1590–1654), English clockmaker, London, clockmaker of the court, pocket watch.

== 1600–1700 ==
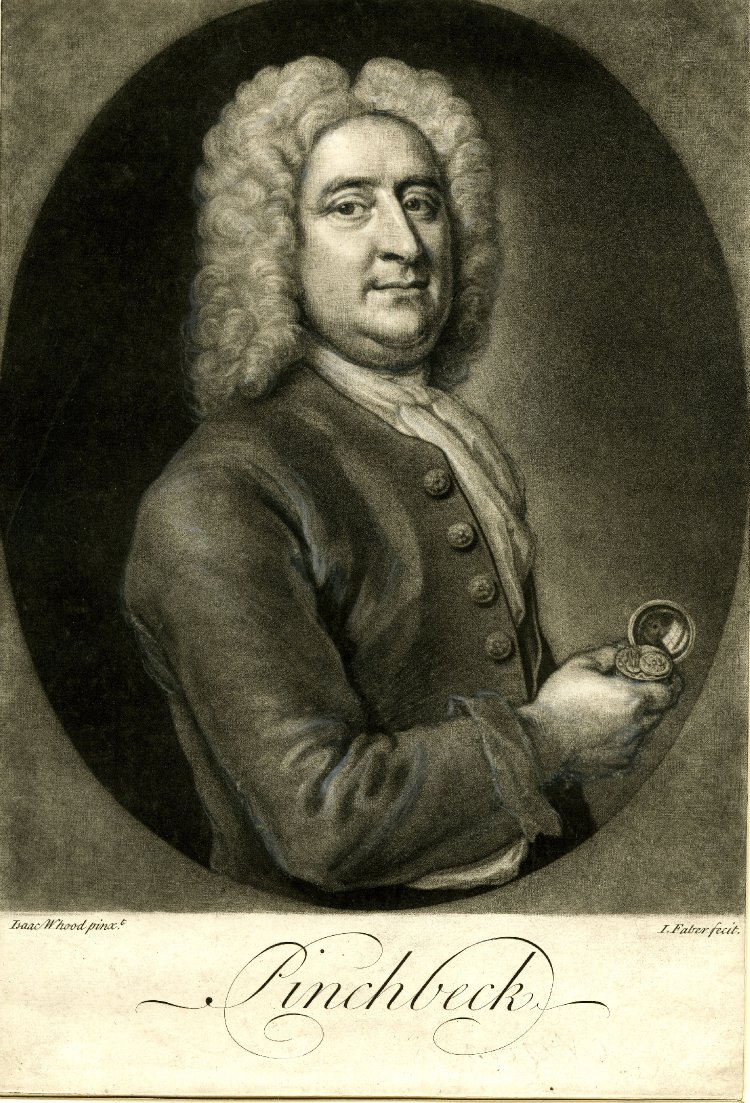
Christopher Pinchbeck (1670–1732)

- Heinrich Gebhardt (1602–1661), German clockmaker, Straßburg, astronomical clock.
- Wolfgang Hager (1602–1674), German clockmaker, Arnstadt.
- Jean Rousseau (1606–1684), Swiss watchmaker, Geneva, complicated pocket watch.
- Ahasuerus Fromanteel (1607–1693), Dutch clockmaker, London and Amsterdam, pendulum clocks.
- Egbert Jans van Leeuwarden (1608–1674), Dutch clockmaker, Utrecht.
- Edward East (bl. 1610–1693), (C. C.), English clockmaker, London, cofounder of the Worshipful Company of Clockmakers, clockmaker of the court.
- David Ramsay (bl. 1613–1651), (first Master of the C. C.), Scottish clockmaker, London, clockmaker of the court of James VI and I and Charles I.
- Salomon Coster (1622–1659), Dutch clockmaker, The Hague, first pendulum clock like Christiaan Huygens.
- Albrecht Erb (1628–1714), Austrian clockmaker, Vienna, clockmaker of the court, astronomical clock.
- Isaac II Thuret (?–1706), French clockmaker, Paris, clockmaker of the court.
- Nathaniel Barrow (?–1699), (C. C.), English clockmaker, London, Master of the Worshipful Company of Clockmakers.
- David Bouquet (1632–?), French watchmaker, pocket watches.
- Edward Barlow (1636–1716), English watchmaker, ratchet chime with repeater.
- William Clement (1638–1704), English watchmaker, London, Clement escapement.
- Thomas Tompion (1639–1713), (C. C.), English clockmaker, London, Master of the Worshipful Company of Clockmakers.
- Joseph Knibb (1640–1711), English clockmaker, London, clocks.
- Johann Martin (1642–1721), German watchmaker, Augsburg, pocket watches, sun dials and table clocks.
- Jean de Hautefeuille (1647–1724), French physician and inventor, Orléans, balance wheel.
- Simon Lachez (1648–1723), Dutch watchmaker, Utrecht, guilt master.
- Daniel Quare (1648–1724), (C. C.), English watchmaker, London, Master of the Worshipful Company of Clockmakers, rack strike movement with repetition.
- Joseph Norris (1650–after 1700), English clockmaker, London, longcase clock, table clocks.
- Johann Willebrand (1658–1726), German clockmaker, Augsburg, clock, sun dial.
- Franz Ludwig Stadlin (1658–1740), Swiss Jesuit, royal clockmaker of the court of China.
- George Etherington (?1660–1728), (C. C.), English clockmaker, York, London, Master of the Worshipful Company of Clockmakers.
- Matthias Ernst (1663–1714), German clockmaker, Ulm. Clockmaker of the city Ulm, longcase clock.
- Nicolas Fatio de Duillier (1664–1753), Swiss mathematician, Duillier, drilled rubies.
- Bernardo Facini (1665–1731), Italian astronomer, mathematician and instrument manufacturer in Venice, Farnasian Clock
- Jacques Thuret (1669–1738), French watchmaker, Paris, clockmaker of the court Louis XIV.
- Christopher Pinchbeck (1670–1732), English watchmaker, London.
- Simon Dilger (1671–1750), German clockmaker, Schollach, Waag clock, teacher.
- George Graham (1673–1751), English watchmaker, London.
- Franz Ketterer (1676–1749), German clockmaker, Schönwald im Schwarzwald, cuckoo clock.
- Benjamin Gray (1676–1764), English clockmaker. London, clockmaker of the court of George II of Great Britain.
- Franz Xaver Bovius (1677–1725), German priest and maker of sun dial, Eichstätt.
- Jean Dutertre (1684–1734), French watchmaker, Paris, duplex escapement.
- Johannes Klein (1684–1762), Czech mathematician, astronomer and mechanic, Prague, astronomical clock and instruments at the Clementinum.
- Julien Le Roy (1686–1759), French clockmaker of the court Louis XV, Paris, pocket watch, introduction of oil sinks.
- Martin Schipani (1693–1759), German watchmaker, Würzburg.
- Jehan-Jacques Blancpain (1693–?), Swiss watchmaker, Villeret. Founder of watch company Blancpain.
- John Harrison (1693–1776), English carpenter and autodidact watchmaker, London, chronometer
- Johann Jacob Möllinger (1695–1763), German watchmaker, Neustadt an der Weinstraße, the Palatinate privileged watchmaker.
- Johann Delucca (1697–1753), Austrian clockmaker, Vienna, longcase clocks, carriage clocks.
- Henry Bridges (1697–1754), English architect and clockmaker, Waltham Abbey, Monumentaluhr Microcosm
- Étienne LeNoir (1699–1778), watchmaker in Paris, master since 1717

== 1700–1800 ==
=== 1700–1750 ===
- John Jefferys (1701–1754), (C. C.), English watchmaker, London, pocket watches
- Johan Zeller (1701–1778), Swiss clockmaker, Basel, night clocks.
- Anders Polhammar (1705–1767), Swedish watchmaker, Stjärnsund.
- John Ellicott d. J. (1706–1772), English watchmaker and inventor, London, clockmaker of the court, compensating pendulum.
- Jacques de Vaucanson (1709–1782), French watchmaker, Paris, automaton clocks.
- Pierre-Joseph de Rivaz (1711–1772), Swiss clockmaker, Paris, one year clock.
- Justin Vulliamy (1712–1797), English clockmaker, London, precision pendulum clock.
- Leopold Hoys (1713–1797), German clockmaker, Bamberg,
- John Whitehurst (1713–1788), English clockmaker, Derby.
- Jean Romilly (1714–1796), Swiss watchmaker, Paris, pocket watch.
- Jean François Poncet (1714–1804), Swiss watchmaker of French origin, clockmaker of the court in Dresden and director of the Grünes Gewölbe.
- Jean-Baptiste Dutertre (1715–1742), French watchmaker, duplex escapement.
- Joseph Möllinger (1715–1772), German clockmaker, Frankenthal, mechanic, piano builder and mint master, clockmaker of the Palatine Zweibrücken court in Zweibrücken.
- Thomas Mudge (1715–1794), English watchmaker, London. inventor of the free lever escapement.
- Pierre Le Roy (1717–1785), French watchmaker, Paris, marine chronometer.
- Joseph Gallmeyr (1717–1790), German clockmaker, Munich, clockmaker of the court and mechanic of the court.
- Johann Albert Roetig (1718–1787), German watchmaker, Hachenburg.
- Larcum Kendall (1719–1790), British watchmaker, London, marine chronometer.
- Jean André Lepaute (1720–1789), French royal watchmaker, Paris.
- Jean Antoine Lépine (1720–1814), French watchmaker, Paris, Lépine caliber, pocket watch.
- Friedrich Möllinger (1720 or 1726–1767), German watchmaker, Mannheim, clockmaker of the court.
- Pierre Jaquet-Droz (1721–1790), Swiss clockmaker, La Chaux-de-Fonds.
- James Cox (1723?–1800), English clockmaker, London, machines, export clocks.
- Daniel Beat Ludwig Funk (1726–1787), Swiss clockmaker, Bern, pendulums.
- David Ruetschmann (Frater David a Sancto Cajetano) (1726–1796), clockmaker and mechanic, Vienna, astronomical clock.
- Jean Baptiste Lepaute, (1727–1802), French royal clockmaker, Paris.
- Willem Snellen (1727–1791), Dutch clockmaker, Dordrecht, astronomical clock, marine chronometer.
- Ferdinand Berthoud (1727–1807), Swiss watchmaker and author, Paris, marine chronometer.
- Pater Aurelianus a San Daniele (1728–1782), German Augustine friar, Thüringen, astronomical longcase clock.
- Sebastian Baumann (1729–1805), German watchmaker, Friedberg, carriage clock.
- Louis Berthoud (1729–1807) Swiss chronometer maker, Paris.
- Abraham-Louis Perrelet (1729–1826), Swiss watchmaker, Le Locle, pocket watch.
- Jean-Marc Vacheron (1731–1805), Swiss watchmaker, Geneva, founder of Vacheron Constantin.
- Josiah Emery (1732–1794), Swiss-born London-based watchmaker, the first to incorporate the lever escapement invented by Thomas Mudge
- Pierre-Augustin Caron de Beaumarchais (1732–1799), French entrepreneur and writer, Paris, double comma escapement.
- Alexander Cumming (1733–1814), (C. C.), English watchmaker, mathematician and mechanic, London.
- Iwan Petrowitsch Kulibin (1735–1818), Russian clockmaker and inventor, Nizhny Novgorod, automated clock for Catherine the Great.
- Franz Jacob Braun (1735–1813), German clockmaker, Eberbach, locksmith and clockmaker.
- John Arnold (1736–1799), (C. C.), English watchmaker, London, marine chronometer.
- Jacob Kock (1737–1805), Swedish clockmaker of the court of Gustav III, Stockholm, cartel clock.
- Philipp Gottfried Schaudt (1739–1809), German schoolmaster and mechanic, Onstmettingen, astronomical clock.
- Philipp Matthäus Hahn (1739–1790), German pastor, engineer, and inventor.
- Johannes Möllinger (1739–1815), German clockmaker, Fischbach, Kaiserslautern, clockmaker of the court.
- Mette Magrete Tvistman (1741–1827), Danish clockmaker
- Robert Robin (1742–1799), French watchmaker, Paris, clockmaker of the court, pocket watch, pendulums.
- Hilaire Bassereau (?–1806), French watchmaker, Paris. clockmaker of the court.
- John Grant (?–1810), English watchmaker, London, chronometer.
- Jean-Moïse Pouzait (1743–1793), Swiss watchmaker and inventor, Geneva, lever escapement.
- Jacques-Frédéric Houriet (1743–1830), Swiss watchmaker, Le Locle, pocket watch, tourbillon.
- Jürgen Jürgensen (1745–1811), Danish watchmaker and manufacturer, Le Locle, pocket watch, longcase clock.
- Peter Kinzing (1745–1816), German clockmaker and mechanic.
- Daniel Möllinger (1746–1794), German clockmaker, Heidelberg, city clock maker.
- Thomas Reid (clockmaker) (1746–1831), English watchmaker, Edinburgh, deck watch.
- Jean-Frédéric Leschot (1747–1824), Swiss clockmaker, Geneva, androids
- Benjamin Vulliamy (1747–1811), English clockmaker of the court George III, London, precision pendulum clock, pocket watch, pocket chronometer.
- Abraham Louis Breguet (1747–1823), Swiss watchmaker and mechanic, tourbillon, Breguet overcoil.
- John Brockbank (1747–1806), English chronometer maker, London, pocket and marine chronometer.
- George Margetts (1748–1808), English chronometer maker, London, pocket and marine chronometer.
- James McCabe (1748–1811), English watchmaker, London, pocket watch.
- Thaddäus Rinderle (1748–1824), German clockmaker and mathematician, Freiburg, watchmaking tools.
- Hubert Sarton (1748–1828), Belgian clockmaker, Liège, pendulums, automatic pocket watch.
- Frédéric Japy (1749–1813), French watchmaker and manufacturer, Beaucourt, ébauche.
- Johann Gottfried Sechting (1749–1814), German clockmaker, student of Hahn, astronomical clock.
- Thomas Earnshaw (1749–1829), English clock and chronometer maker, London, marine chronometer.
- Antoine Tavan (1749–1836), Swiss watchmaker, Geneva, Präzisionstaschenuhren.
- John Wilter, fictitious name used on many Dutch forgeries.

=== 1750–1800 ===
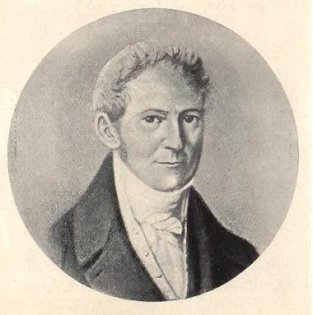
Frédéric-Louis Favre-Bulle (1770–1849)

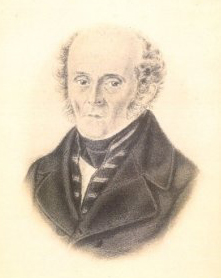
David Henri Grandjean (1774–1845)

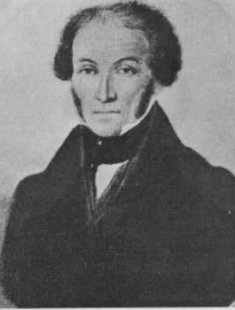
Louis Benjamin Audemars (1782–1833)

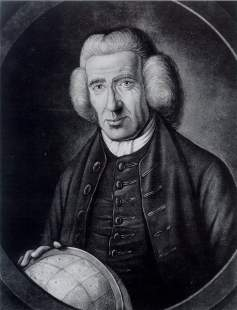
James Ferguson Cole (1798–1880)

- Johann Anton Roetig (1750–1800), German clockmaker, Hachenburg.
- Paul Philipp Barraud (1750–1820), (C. C.), English clockmaker, London, chronometer.
- Georg Matthias Burger (1750–1825), German mystic, Nürnberg. sun dial, mechanical terrestrial and celestial globes.
- Antide Janvier (1751–1835), French clockmaker, Paris, astronomical clock.
- Johann Peter Stahlschmidt (1751–1833), German clockmaker, Freudenberg, grandfather clocks.
- Alexius Johann (1753–1826), German engineer of astronomical clocks.
- Simon Willard, (1753–1848), American clockmaker, Boston, Banjo-Clock.
- Pierre Louis Berthoud (1754–1813), French watchmaker, Paris, chronometer, pocket watches.
- Elias Möllinger (1754–1799), German watchmaker, Neustadt.
- Christian Möllinger (1754–1826), German clockmaker and author, Berlin, chief clockmaker of the court, pendulum clocks.
- Noël Bourret (1755–1803), French clockmaker.
- Theobald Schmitt (1756–1835), German clockmaker and gunsmith, Lindenfels-Odenwald.
- Louis Courvoisier (1758–1832), Swiss watchmaker, La Chaux-de-Fonds, pocket watch and pendulums.
- Johann Christoph Schuster (1759–1823), German clockmaker. inventor of a calculator.
- Levi Hutchins (1761–1855), American clockmaker, Concord (New Hampshire), inventor of the alarm clock.
- Philipp Fertbaur (1763–1820), Austrian clockmaker, Vienna, Laterndluhr.
- Philipp Happacher (?–1843), Austrian clockmaker, Vienna, precision pendulum clock.
- William Anthony (ca. 1764–1844), English watchmaker, London, pocket watches for the Chinese market.
- Baptist Johann (1765–1826), German engineer, astronomical clocks.
- Jacob Auch (1765–1842), south German clockmaker, Weimar, student of Philipp Matthäus Hahn, clockmaker of the court.
- Justus Jacob Hespe (1765–1842), German clockmaker, mechanic and inventor, Hannover, three-wheeled driving machine.
- Louis Moinet (1768–1853), French watchmaker, sculptor, and painter, Paris, chronograph, clocks.
- John Roger Arnold (1769–1843), (C. C.), English clockmaker, London, marine and pocket chronometer.
- Joseph Geist (c. 1770–1824), Austrian clockmaker, Graz, first Austrian clock producer.
- Frédéric-Louis Favre-Bulle (1770–1849), Swiss chronometer maker, Le Locle, marine chronometer, tourbillon.
- Willam Congreve (1772–1828), English jurist and technician, London, rolling ball clock.
- Jean Francois Bautte (1772–1837), Swiss watchmaker, Geneva, very thin pocket watches.
- Eli Terry (1772–1852), American manufacturer and clockmaker, Connecticut, introduction of mass production to clock making.
- David Henri Grandjean (1774–1845), Swiss watchmaker, Le Locle, highly complicated pocket watch.
- John Bliss (1775–1857) American chronometer maker, New York, marine chronometer.
- Jean-Baptiste Schwilgué (1776–1856), French clockmaker, Straßburg, restorer of the clockwork of the astronomical clock at the Straßburger Münster.
- Urban Jürgensen (1776–1830), Danish watchmaker, Copenhagen, deck watch, tourbillon.
- Philipp Schmitt (1777–1827), German clockmaker Lindenfels.
- William Frodsham (1779–1850), English clock and chronometer maker, London, chronometer.
- John Barwise (1780 or 1790–1842), English clock and chronometer maker.
- Josef Kossek (1780–1858), Czech clockmaker, Prague, precision pendulum clock.
- Benjamin Louis Vulliamy (1780–1854), (C. C.), English clockmaker, turret clock, clocks, clockmaker of the court.
- Johann Kessels (1781–1849), German-Danish chronometer maker, Altona, marine chronometer and deck watch.
- Louis Benjamin Audemars (1782–1833), Swiss watchmaker and manufacturer, Le Brassus.
- Josef Božek (1782–1835), Czech inventor and clockmaker, Prague, precision pendulum clock.
- Friedrich Wilhelm Roetig (1782–1861), German clockmaker, Hachenburg.
- Johann Christian Friedrich Gutkaes sen. (1785–1845), Dresden, watchmaker, royal clockmaker of the court.
- Seth Thomas (1785–1859), American manufacturer and clockmaker, Connecticut, Seth Thomas Clocks.
- Jean-Francois Motel (1786–1857), French chronometer maker, Paris, marine chronometer.
- Ephraim Downes (1787–1860), American clockmaker, Connecticut, wooden clock.
- Peter Friedrich Ingold (also: Piere Ingold) (1787–1878), Swiss watchmaker and manufacturer, La Chaux-de-Fonds/Boston, pocket watch, tools (Ingold-Fräse).
- François Constantin (1788–1854), Swiss entrepreneur, Geneva, Vacheron Constantin.
- Thomas Frederick Cooper(1789-1863) English watchmaker London, pocket watch
- Edward John Dent (1790–1853), English watchmaker, London, pocket watch, marine chronometer.
- Jean Jacob (1793–1871), French clockmaker, Paris, chronometer, longcase clock.
- Chauncey Jerome (1793–1868), American clockmaker, Connecticut, New Haven Clock Co.
- Christian Friedrich Tiede (1794–1877), German clockmaker, Berlin, marine chronometer.
- Carl Suchy, (1796–1866), Bohemian watch producer, Prague, pendulum clocks, k.u.k. Hoflieferant.
- Edouard Bovet (1797–1849), Swiss watchmaker and entrepreneur, watch brand Bovet.
- James Ferguson Cole (1798–1880), English watchmaker, London, pocket watch, deck watch.
- Johann Mannhardt (1798–1878), German maker of turret clocks, Munich, Mannhardt-Escapement, turret clock Münchner Frauenkirche.
- Joseph Saxton (1799–1873), American clockmaker, inventor and instrument maker, Philadelphia.
- Joseph Thaddäus Winnerl (1799–1886), Austrian watchmaker, Paris, marine chronometer.
- Franz Baumann (before 1800–after 1852), Austrian clock and chronometer maker, Vienna. clockmaker of the court, tourbillon.

== 1800–1900 ==
=== 1800–1850 ===
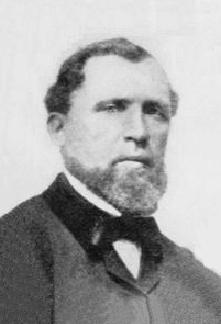
Louis-Victor Baume (1817–1887)

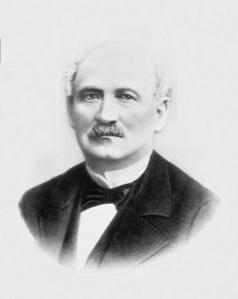
Pierre-Joseph Celestin Baume

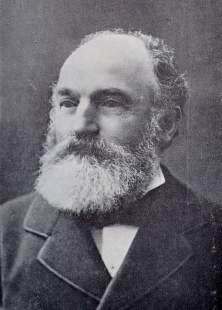
Onésime Dumas (1824–1889)

- William Frederick Rippon (?–1827), (C. C.), English clockmaker, London, the Great Clock of Westminster.
- Louis-Gabriel Brocot (1800–1860), French big clock maker, Paris, Brocot-Hemmung.
- James Eiffe (1800–1880), English chronometer maker, compensation for secondary temperature error.
- Georges Auguste Leschot (1800–1884), Swiss watchmaker and inventor, Geneva, Vacheron Constantin.
- Jean-Célanis Lutz (1800–1863), Swiss watchmaker, hardening of steel spirals.
- Edward Prior (1800–1868), English watchmaker, London, pocket watch for the Turkish market.
- Jean Paul Garnier (1801–1869), French clockmaker, Paris, electric clocks.
- Carl August von Steinheil (1801–1870), German physician and astronomer, Munich, first electric clock.
- Jules Sueur (1801–1867), Swiss watchmaker, astronomer and inventor, Geneva, astronimichal time theory implementation.
- Charles Klaftenberger (1802–1874), English chronometer maker, London.
- George Airy (1802–1892), English astronomer and director of the Royal Greenwich Observatory.
- Andreas Hohwü (1803–1885), Dutch chronometer maker, Amsterdam, astronomical clock.
- Charles Antoine LeCoultre (1803–1881), Swiss watchmaker, Le Sentier, Jaeger-LeCoultre.
- Charles-Félicien Tissot (1804–1873), Swiss Watchmaker, Le Locle, founder of Tissot.
- Louis Clément François Breguet (1804–1883), French watchmaker, Paris, central clock of Lyon, tuning fork clock.
- Achille Hubert Benoit (1804–1895), French watchmaker, Versailles, director of the royal factory, director of the watchmaking school of Cluses.
- Heinrich Moser (1805–1874), Swiss watchmaker from Schaffhausen (Switzerland), founder of H. Moser & Cie.
- Lorenz Bob (1805–1878), German clockmaker, Furtwangen, Schwarzwald.
- Carl Theodor Wagner (1805–1885), German master watchmaker and entrepreneur, Wiesbaden.
- Auguste-Lucien Vérité (1806–1887), French clockmaker, Beauvais, astronomical clock.
- Friedrich Adolph Nobert (1806–1881), German mechanic and optician, Barth.
- Johann Carl Rahsskopff (1806–1886), German clockmaker and mechanic, Koblenz, clocks with worm gears.
- Lorenz Furtwängler (1807–?), German clockmaker and manufacturer, Furtwangen, wall clocks.
- Michael Welte (1807–1880), German musical clock maker, Freiburg im Breisgau, M. Welte & Sons Co., Schwarzwald.
- Jules Frederik Jürgensen (1808–1877), Danish watch- and chronometer maker, Le Locle, deck watch.
- Auguste Agassiz (1809–1877), Swiss Watchmaker, Fribourg, founder of Longines.
- Charles Frodsham (1810–1871), English watch and chronometer maker, London, chronometer, tourbillon.
- Frédéric-William Dubois (1811–1869), Swiss chronometer maker, Le Locle, astronomical pendulum clock.
- Alexander Bain (1811–1877), Scottish watchmaker and inventor. Glasgow.
- Johann Harder (1811–1888), German farmer and tinker, inventor of the lannual clock about 1875.
- Johann Weule (1811–1897), German clockmaker, Harz, Turmuhren.
- Antoni Norbert Patek (1811–1877), Polish pioneer in watchmaking, creator of Patek Philippe & Co
- Eduard Eppner (1812–1887), German clockmaker, Halle/Lähn, pocket watch, Turmuhren.
- Aaron Lufkin Dennison (1812–1895), American watchmaker, Maine, USA. Waltham Watch Company. pocket watch.
- Georg Friedrich Roskopf (1813–1889), German watchmaker, La Chaux-de-Fonds, Roskopf escapement.
- Matthäus Hipp (1813–1893), German clockmaker, Bern, electric precision pendulum clock.
- Edward Howard (1813–1904), American watchmaker and manufacturer, Waltham Watch Company, pocket watch.
- Friedrich Emil Roetig (1814–1863), German watchmaker, Hachenburg, Taleruhr.
- Romuald Božek (1814–1899), Czech inventor and watchmaker, Prague.
- Ferdinand Adolph Lange (1815–1875), German watchmaker and entrepreneur, Glashütte.
- Adrien Philippe (1815–1894), French watchmaker, Paris, Patek Philippe.
- Johann Baptist Beha (1815–1898), German clockmaker, Eisenbach, Black Forest cuckoo clock.
- Edward Daniel Johnson (1816–1889), (C. C.), English watchmaker, London, chronometer, fellow of the Royal Society.
- Claudius Saunier (1816–1896), French watchmaker and teacher, Paris.
- Edmand Denison (1816–1905), English lawyer and architect, Nottinghamshire, engineer of the turret clock of Big Ben.
- Auguste Grether (1817–1897), Swiss watchmaker, Le Locle, tourbillon.
- Friedrich Krille (1817–1863), German chronometer maker, Altona, marine chronometer, precision pendulum clock.
- Achille Brocot (1817–1878), French clockmaker, Paris, improvement of the Brocot escapement.
- Auguste Grether (1817–1879), Swiss watchmaker, Ponts-de-Martel, chronometer ebauches, tourbillon.
- Louis-Victor Baume (1817–1887), Swiss watch producer, Bern, Baume & Mercier.
- Edward Thomas Loseby (1817–1890), English watchmaker, London, marine chronometer
- Antoine Redier (1817–1892), French clockmaker, Paris, Wecker, clocks, scientific instruments.
- Charles Edouard Jacot (1817–1897), Swiss watchmaker, Le Locle, c. 1830 New York, Chinese Duplexhemmung.
- John Poole (1818–1867), English watchmaker, London, chronometer.
- Charles Fasoldt (1818–1898), American watchmaker, Albany, chronometer, Fasoldt-Hemmung, fine adjustment
- Christian Reithmann (1818–1909), German watchmaker and inventor. machines, free escapement, four stroke motor.
- Johannes Bürk (1819–1872), German clockmaker and entrepreneur, Villingen-Schwenningen. founder of the clock company Bürk.
- Gustav Eduard Becker (1819–1885), German clockmaker from Schlesien, founder of the Gustav Becker clock company.
- Eduard Phillips (1821–1889), French mathematician, Paris, precision adjustment, compensating balance wheels.
- Johann Ignaz Fuchs (1821–1893), German mechanic and clockmaker, Bernburg, Turmuhren.
- Betty Linderoth (1822–1900), Swedish mechanic and clockmaker
- Thomas Mercer (1822–1900), English watchmaker, London, chronometer.
- Erhard Junghans (1823–1870), German clockmaker, Schramberg, founder of the Junghans brand.
- Ulysse Nardin (1823–1876), Swiss watchmaker, Le Locle, chronometer.
- Henri Robert Ekegrèn (1823–1896), Danish watchmaker, Geneva, Urban Jürgensen, chronometer
- Onésime Dumas (1824–1889), French chronometer maker, Saint-Nicolas-d'Aliermont, chronometer.
- Victor Kullberg (1824–1890), Swedish chronometer maker, London, chronometer blanks.
- Louis Brandt (1825–1879), Swiss watchmaker and politician, La Chaux-de-Fonds, founder of Omega
- Johann Andreas Ludwig Teubner (1825–1907), clockmaker of the court, Dresden, creator of the second Five-Minutes-Clock of the Semperoper.
- Karl Moritz Großmann (1826–1885), German clockmaker, Glashütte, marine chronometer, precision clock.
- Hans Jess Martens (1826–1892), German watchmaker and author, head of the Badischen watchmaking school Furtwangen.
- Julius Assmann (1827–1886) watchmaker and watch producer, Glashütte, chronometer and deck watch.
- Bonaventura Eijsbouts (1827–1920), Dutch clockmaker, Asten, clock tower maker Royal Eijsbouts.
- Julius Grossmann (1829–1907), German watchmaker, director of the watchmaking school in Le Locle.
- Charles-Émile Tissot (1830–1910), Swiss Watchmaker and politician, Le Locle, co-founder of Tissot.
- Charles Shepherd jun. (1830–1905), English clockmaker, engineer, made the gate clock of the Greenwich Observatory.
- Maurice Ditisheim (1831–1899), Swiss watchmaker and entrepreneur, in La Chaux-de-Fonds, Vulcain.
- Alexis Favre (1832–1908), Swiss watchmaker, Geneva. famous Regleur.
- Albert Pellaton-Favre (1832–1914), Swiss watchmaker, tourbillon-chronometer.
- François Perregaux (1834–1877), Swiss watchmaker, Le Locle, first watchmaker in Japan.
- James Favre-Brandt (1836–1910), Swiss Watchmaker, Le Locle, pioneer of watchmaking in Asia (1863).
- Hilda Petrini (1838–1895), first female Swedish watchmaker, Stockholm, chronometer.
- Karl Julius Späth (1838–1919), German tinker, Steinmauern, astronomical clock.
- Wilhelm Ehrlich (1839–1894), German watchmaker, Bremerhaven, marine chronometer.
- Edouard Heuer (1840–1892), Swiss watchmaker, Biel. Heuer.
- Charles-Auguste Paillard (1840–1895), Swiss watchmaker, palladium alloy for hairsprings.
- Heinrich Zilliken (1841–1900), German clockmaker, Münstermaifelder Turmuhrenfabrik Turmuhrbau.
- Florentine Ariosto Jones (1841–1916), American watchmaker and entrepreneur, New Hampshire, USA, founder of IWC.
- James Favre-Brandt (1841–1923), Swiss watchmaker, Le Locle, pioneer of watchmaking in Japan (1863).
- Johannes Dürrstein (1845–1901), German watchmaker, Glashütte, founder of Glashütter Uhrenfabrik "Union" (1893–1926).
- Richard Lange (1845–1932), German watchmaker and entrepreneur, Glashütte, A. Lange & Söhne.
- Eduard Kummer (1845–?), Swiss watchmaker and founder of Ed. Kummer AG.
- Sigmand Riefler (1847–1912), German clockmaker, Munich, Riefler precision pendulum clocks.
- Webster Clay Ball (1847–1922), American jeweller and watchmaker, Cleveland, railroad chronometer, Hamilton Watch Company.
- Henri Lioret (1848–1938), French watchmaker and inventor, Paris, automatons, first useful audio recordings.
- Thomas Russell (1780?–1850?), English watchmaker, Liverpool, marine chronometers, high-quality pocket watches, founded the Thomas Russell watchmaking firm in 1811.

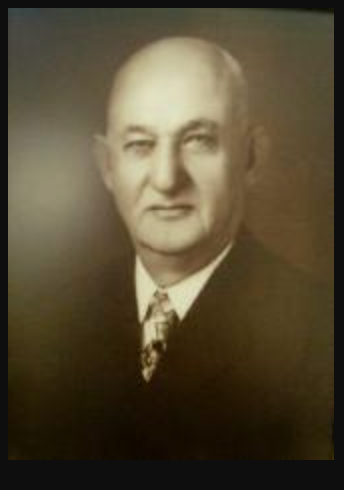
Joseph "Joe" Koen, founder of Joe Koen & Son Jewelers circa 1883

=== 1850–1900 ===
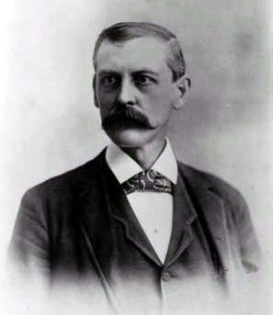
Harlow E. Bundy (1856–?)

- Joseph "Joe" Koen (1859–1944), Russian watchmaker & jeweler, Born in Vilna, Russia, immigrated to Austin, Texas. Koen founded Joe Koen & Son Jewelers in 1883 - Texas' oldest independently owned jewelry store.
- Carl Ranch (c. 1900), Danish chronometer maker
- Albert Favarger (1851–1931), American clockmaker, Neuchâtel, electric slave clock
- Richard Bürk (1851–1934), German entrepreneur, Villingen-Schwenningen. Württembergische Uhrenfabrik Bürk.
- Arthur Junghans (1852–1920), German clockmaker, Schramberg, founder of Junghans.
- Curt Dietzschold (1852–1922), German engineer, watchmaker and teacher, director of the watchmaking school Karlstein a. d. Th. (Austria).
- Gustav Speckhart (1852–1919), German clockmaker of the court, inventor and clock collector, Nürnberg.
- Ludwig Strasser (1853–1917), German clockmaker, Glashütte, precision pendulum clocks, German watchmaking school Strasser & Rohde.
- Wilhelm Schultz (1854–1921), German watchmaker and editor, Stuttgart/Berlin, German calendar watchmaker.
- Paul David Nardin (1855–1920), Swiss watchmaker and Regleur, Le Locle.
- Josef Nicolaus (1855–1923), Austrian chronometer maker, Vienna, deck watch.
- Harlow E. Bundy (1856–1916), American clockmaker, Auburn, New York, mass production, Bundy Manufacturing Company.
- Richard Gläser (1856–1928), German watchmaker, Glashütte, pocket watch.
- Henning Hammarlund (1857–1922), Swedish watch producer, Svängsta, Halda.
- Paul Berner (1858–1942), Swiss watchmaker and teacher, longtime director of the watchmaking school in La Chaux-de-Fonds.
- Max Stührling (1859–1932), Swiss watchmaker, Biel. Stuhrling.
- Bahne Bonniksen (1859–1935), Danish watchmaker, London, Carousell.
- Léon Breitling (1860–1914), Swiss watchmaker, Saint-Imier, founder of Breitling SA.
- Kintarō Hattori (1860–1934), Japanese watchmaker, Tokyo, founder of Seiko.
- Hermann Goertz (1862–1944), German clockmaker, Glashütte, precision pendulum clock.
- Hugo Müller (1863–1943), German watchmaker, Glashütte.
- Carl Friedrich Bucherer (?–1933), Swiss watchmaker, Lucerne, founder of Carl F. Bucherer.
- Jens Jensen (1865–1933), German watchmaker, Glashütte, deck watch.
- Ludwig Trapp (1865–1949), German clockmaker, Glashütte, precision pendulum clocks.
- Max Richter (1866–1922), German clockmaker, Glashütte, precision pendulum clocks.
- Paul Ditisheim (1868–1945), Swiss watchmaker, La Chaux-de-Fonds, pocket watch and marine chronometer.
- Richard Griesbach (1868–1948) German watchmaker, Glashütte, compensating balance wheels for marine chronometer.
- Alfred Jaccard (?–1953), Swiss Regleur and chronometer maker, Besançon.
- Bruno Hillmann (1869–1928), German watchmaker, Zürich. first wrist watch.
- Georges Louis Ruedin (1870–1935), Swiss watch producer, Berner Jura, director of the Société Horlogère Reconvilier.
- Jens Olsen (1872–1945), Danish clockmaker, Ribe, astronomical world clock in Copenhagen.
- Jämes Pellaton (1873–1954), Swiss watchmaker, Le Locle, tourbillon.
- Louis Cartier (1875–1942), French watchmaker, Paris, Cartier watch brand.
- Rudolf Flume (um 1880), German watchmaker, Berlin, Flume-Werksucher.
- Jules Haag (1882–1953), mathematician, Besançon, Isochronism.
- Georges Schaeren (1882–1958), Swiss watchmaker, Biel, Mido SA.
- William Hamilton Shortt (1882–1971), English clockmaker, London, Shortt clock.
- Léon Hatot (1883–1953), French watchmaker and jeweller, Besançon, cofounder of the Chronometrical Society of France, Léon Hatot.
- Karl W. Höhnel (1885–1936), German clockmaker, Glashütte, precision pendulum clocks.
- William Baume (1885–1956), Swiss watchmaker, Geneva (Switzerland), founder of Baume & Mercier.
- Gustav Gerstenberger (1886–1983), German Regleur and chronometer maker, Glashütte, marine chronometer, deck watch.
- Alfred Helwig (1886–1974), German watchmaker, Glashütte, tourbillon.
- Louis Zimmer (1888–1970), Belgian clockmaker, Lier, astronomical clock in Lier, Zimmer tower.
- André Bornand (1892–1967), Swiss watchmaker, Geneva. teacher of the watchmaking school Geneva.
- Reinhard Straumann (1892–1967), Swiss engineer, watch timing machine, Nivarox.
- John Harwood (1893–1965), English inventor and clockmaker, automatic wrist watch, Fortis watch brand.
- Rasmus Sørnes (1893–1967), Norwegian radio technician and clockmaker, Sola, astronomical clock.
- Paul Behrens (1893–1984), German clockmaker, Lübeck, astronomical clock.
- Marius Lavet (1894–1980), French clockmaker, Paris, ATO-Uhren, Lavet stepper motor.
- Barney Mirvis (1895–1967), Swiss-trained South African watchmaker, Pretoria, Mirvis & Co.
- Georges Henri Ruedin (1895–1953), Swiss watchmaker, Bassecourt, Georges Ruedin SA.
- Adolf Scheibe (1895–1958), German physician, Berlin, engineer of the quartz clock.
- Albert Pellaton (1898–1966), Swiss watchmaker, Schaffhausen, Pellaton winding system for automatic watches.

== 1900–2000s ==
- Udo Adelsberger (1904–1992), German physician, Königsberg. developer of the quartz clock.
- Kamiel Festraets (1904–1974), Flemish clockmaker, Sint-Truiden, astronomical clock of Sint-Truiden.
- Horst Landrock (1904–1990) German clockmaker and collector, Zittau, Sammlung Landrock.
- Hans Apel (1905–1958), German watch and chronometer maker, Glashütte, student of Alfred Helwig.
- Fred Lip (1905–1996), French producer of watches and machines, Besançon, Lip.
- Walter Storz (1906–1974), German master watchmaker, Hornberg, founder of the Stowa clock company.
- Georg Abeler (1906–1981), German watchmaker, Wuppertal, founder of Wuppertaler Uhrenmuseum.
- Henry Fried (1907–1996), American watchmaker, New York, author.
- Hans Jendritzki (1907–1996), German watchmaker and author, Hamburg.
- August Spetzler (1911–2010), German watchmaker, Nürnberg, student of Alfred Helwig, tourbillon.
- Willy Breitling (1913–1979), Swiss watchmaker, Saint-Imier, President of Breitling SA
- Karl Geitz (1913–2008), German watchmaker, teacher, founder of the Hessian watchmaking school.
- Max Hetzel (born 1921), Swiss physician, Biel, Bulova Accutron.
- Hans Lang (1924–2013), German watchmaker, astronomical clocks.
- George Daniels (1926–2011), (C. C.), English watchmaker, Master of the Worshipful Company of Clockmakers., Inventor of the coaxial escapement.
- Richard Mühe (1929–2009), German watchmaker, Furtwangen. president of the German Society for Timekeeping (1981 to 1999).
- Richard Daners (1930–2018), German watchmaker, works for Gübelin.
- Martin Burgess (born 1931), (FBHI), English watchmaker and author, Sculptural Clock, Gurney Clock.
- Wolfgang Hilberg (1932–2015), German engineer and professor of electronics, inventor of the radio clock.
- Jürgen Abeler (1933–2010), German art collector, watchmaker, goldsmith and gemologist.
- Kurt Klaus (born 1934), Swiss watchmaker, engineer at IWC, perpetual calendar with four digit year indication
- Roger Dubuis (1938–2017), Swiss watchmaker, Roger Dubuis SA.
- Derek Pratt (1938–2009), English watchmaker, collaboration with Urban Jürgensen SA.
- Anthony G. Randall (born 1938), English watchmaker, engineer of the Double-Axis-Tourbillon.
- Reinhard Meis (born 1940), German watchmaker and author.
- Svend Andersen (born 1942), (AHCI), Danish watchmaker, cofounder of the (AHCI).
- Gerd-Rüdiger Lang (1943-2023), founder of Chronoswiss.
- Carlo Crocco (born 1944), Italian watchmaker from Milan (Italy), cofounder of the Swiss-based luxury brand Hublot Watches.
- Vincent Calabrese (born 1944), (AHCI), Italian watchmaker, cofounder of the (AHCI), "Golden Bridge" of Corum, Universal Genève.
- Daniel Roth (born 1945), Swiss watchmaker, Daniel Roth SA (with the Bulgari company since 2000).
- Edmond Capt (born 1946), Swiss watchmaker, general director of Frédéric Piguet and Nouvelle Lémania, engineer Mouvement Valjoux 7750.
- Philippe Dufour (born 1948), (AHCI), Swiss watchmaker.
- Paul Gerber (born 1950), (AHCI), Swiss watchmaker, Zürich.
- Michel Parmigiani (born 1950), Swiss watchmaker. Parmigiani.
- Jean-Pierre Musy (born 1951), Swiss watchmaker, responsible for R&D at Patek Philippe.
- Ludwig Oechslin (born 1952), Italian watch engineer, La Chaux-de-Fonds, former director of the International Museum of Horology.
- Russell A. Powell (born 1954), American born watchmaker at Patek Philippe.
- Antoine Preziuso (born 1957), ((AHCI)), Swiss watchmaker, Patek Philippe, Antiquorum, tourbillon.
- Franck Muller (born 1958), Swiss watchmaker, Genthod, Franck Muller SA.
- Christophe Claret (born 1962), Swiss watchmaker, Christophe Claret SA.
- Kari Voutilainen (born 1962), (AHCI), Finnish watchmaker residing in Môtiers, Switzerland.
- Beat Haldimann (born 1964), (AHCI), Swiss watchmaker, double regulator, tourbillon.
- Giulio Papi (born 1965), Swiss watchmaker, former Renaud & Papi SA, today Audemars Piguet.
- Thomas Prescher (born 1966), (AHCI), German watchmaker, Triple-Achs-Tourbillon.
- Barry B. Kaplan (born 1971), American watchmaker at KIVA Watch.
- Andreas Strehler (born 1971), (AHCI), Swiss watchmaker, Pendule Sympathique, moon phase, complication (horology).
- Johnny Dang (born 1974), Vietnamese American jeweler and watchmaker, based in Houston
- Konstantin Chaykin (Konstantin Jurjewitsch Tschaikin) (born 1975), (AHCI), Russian watchmaker, Saint Petersburg, armband- and table clocks with complication.
- Stéphanie Sivrière (born 1975), French watchmaker and jewellery designer for Piaget SA
- Valerii Danevych (born 1968), (AHCI), Ukrainian watchmaker, created first in the world wooden flying tourbillon.
- Rebecca Struthers (born 1985–1886), English watchmaker and author
- Yoshikazu Akahane (died 1999), Japanese engineer, creator of Seiko's Spring Drive mechanical movement regulated by a quartz oscillator instead of a traditional escapement.
- Roberto Bertotti (born 1967), Italian watchmaker, fixing most of the watches, clocks, chronometers, Pendulum clocks, etc. Workshop in Rovereto, Italy.
- Sotirios Marinis (born 1971), professional watchmaker in Thessaloniki, a city with a long-standing tradition in craftsmanship and watchmaking. Founder of DORION Mechanical Watches.
- Masahiro Kikuno (born 1983), (AHCI), Japanese watchmaker, created the first wristwatch with a Japanese clock complication.
- Andrzej Trojanowski (born 1979), independent watchmaker based in Warsaw, Poland.
- François-Paul Journe (born 1957), Marseille, resonance chronometer, founder of F.P. Journe.
- Roger W. Smith (born 1970), Bolton near Manchester, British independent watchmaker, founder of Roger W. Smith, LTD.
