= Prix Gaïa =

Watchmaking award

Prix Gaïa is an honorary award in watchmaking.

Since 1993, the Musée international d'horlogerie (MIH) in La Chaux-de-Fonds presents this award for special achievements in watchmaking. The Prix Gaïa recognizes the achievements in three categories: "Artisanat création" (arts and creations), "Esprit d'entreprise" (entrepreneurship) and "Histoire" (history and research). Nominations are submitted to the management team of the MIH and discussed by the awards committee, that includes 10 to 15 people and is chaired by the MIH curator.

== Former winners in the categories ==
- 1993 Jean-Claude Nicolet, Artisanat-creation, Henry Louis Belmont, Histoire-recherches, André Margot, Esprit d'entreprise
- 1994 François-Paul Journe, Artisanat-creation, François Mercier, Histoire-recherches, Anton Bally, Esprit d'entreprise
- 1995 Michel Parmigiani, Artisanat-creation, Ludwig Oechslin, Histoire-recherches, Antoine Simonin, Esprit d'entreprise
- 1996 Vincent Calabrese, Artisanat-creation, Jean-Luc Mayaud, Histoire-recherches, Günter Blümlein, Esprit d'entreprise
- 1997 Richard Daners, Artisanat-creation, Jean-Claude Sabrier, Histoire-recherches, Jean-Pierre Musy, Esprit d'entreprise
- 1998 Philippe Dufour, Artisanat-creation, Yves Droz and Joseph Flores, Histoire-recherches, Luigi Macaluso, Esprit d'entreprise
- 1999 Derek Pratt, Artisanat-creation, Estelle Fallet, Histoire-recherches, Gabriel Feuvrier, Esprit d'entreprise
- 2000 René Bannwart, Artisanat-creation, Kathleen Pritschard, Histoire-recherches, Simone Bédat, Esprit d'entreprise
- 2001 George Daniels, Artisanat-creation, Catherine Cardinal, Histoire-recherches, Rolf Schnyder, Esprit d'entreprise
- 2003 Antony G. Randall, Artisanat-creation
- 2004 André Beyner, Esprit d'entreprise
- 2006 Luigi Pippa, Artisanat-creation, John H. Leopold, Histoire-recherches
- 2007 Paul Gerber, Artisanat-creation
- 2008 Nicolas G. Hayek, Esprit d'entreprise
- 2009 Beat Haldimann, Artisanat-creation, Robert Greubel and Stephen Forsey, Esprit d'entreprise
- 2010 Jacques Mueller and Elmar Mock, Artisanat-creation, Jean-Claude Biver, Esprit d'entreprise
- 2011 François Junod, Artisanat-creation, Pierre-Yves Donzé, Histoire-recherches, Philippe Stern, Esprit d'entreprise
- 2012 Eric Coudray, Artisanat-creation, Francesco Garufo, Histoire-recherches, Franco Cologni, Esprit d'entreprise
- 2013 Andreas Strehler, Artisanat-creation, Günther Oestmann, Histoire-recherches, Ernst Thomke, Esprit d'entreprise
- 2014 Kari Voutilainen, Artisanat-creation, Pierre Thomann, Histoire-recherches, Henri Dubois, Esprit d'entreprise
- 2015 Anita Porchet, Artisanat-creation, Jonathan Betts, Histoire-recherches, Giulio Papi, Esprit d’entreprise
- 2016 Vianney Halter, Artisanat-creation, Giovanni Busca et Pascal Rochat, Esprit d'entreprise, Roger Smith, Histoire-recherche
- 2017 Jean-Marc Wiederrect, Artisanat-creation, Richard Mille, Esprit d'entreprise, Laurence Marti, Histoire-recherche
- 2018 Paul Clementi, Artisanat-creation, Maximilian Büsser, Esprit d'entreprise, Reinhard Meis, Histoire-recherche
- 2019 Suzanne Rohr, Artisanat-creation, Karl-Friedrich Scheufele, Esprit d'entreprise, Laurent Tissot, Histoire-recherche
- 2020 Antoine Preziuso, Artisanat-creation, Felix Baumgartner et Martin Frei, Esprit d'entreprise, Denis Savois, Histoire-recherche
- 2021 Carole Kasapi, Artisanat-creation, Eric Klein, Esprit d'entreprise, Anthony Turner, Histoire-recherche
- 2022 Laurent Barotte, Craftsmanship-creation, Edouard Meylan, Entrepreneurship, Nico de Rooij, History-research
- 2023 Georges Brodbeck, Craftsmanship-creation, Miguel Garcia, Entrepreneurship, Hans Boeckh, History-research
- 2024 Jean-Pierre Hagmann, Craftsmanship-creation, Jasmine Audemars, Entrepreneurship, Caroline Rothauge, History-research
- 2025 Roger W. Smith, Craftsmanship-creation, Jean-Jacques Paolini, Entrepreneurship, Helmut Crott, History-research
