= Maitres du Temps =

Swiss watch company

Maîtres du Temps
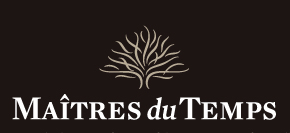
- Type: Watchmaker
- Industry: Watchmaking
- Founded: 2005
- Headquarters: La Chaux-de-Fonds, Switzerland
- Area served: Worldwide
- Key people: Steven M. Holtzman
- Products: Luxury Timepieces
- Website: www.maitresdutemps.com

Maîtres du Temps is a Swiss watch company. Founded in 2005 by Steven Holtzman, the brand is based in La Chaux-de-Fonds, Switzerland. The brand launched in Geneva in 2008 with Chapter One, a watch developed by Christophe Claret, Roger Dubuis and Peter Speake-Marin.

== Corporate history ==
Steven Holtzman began his career in horology in the United States in 1982 when he joined the sales team at his father's company, the Gruen Marketing Corporation. He then moved into the distribution and marketing of high-end Swiss brands, including Roger Dubuis SA (terminated in 2008) and Jean Dunand. Holtzman then decided to launch his own brand and, after a few years of development, he founded Maîtres du Temps in 2005.

The concept of the brand is based on teams of master watchmakers collaborating to develop a watch. The company launched their first model, Chapter One by master watchmakers Christophe Claret, Roger Dubuis and Peter Speake-Marin, in Geneva in 2008. Chapter Two, developed by Daniel Roth, Peter Speake-Marin and Roger Dubuis, was presented in 2009.

== Overview of Production ==
=== Chapter One ===
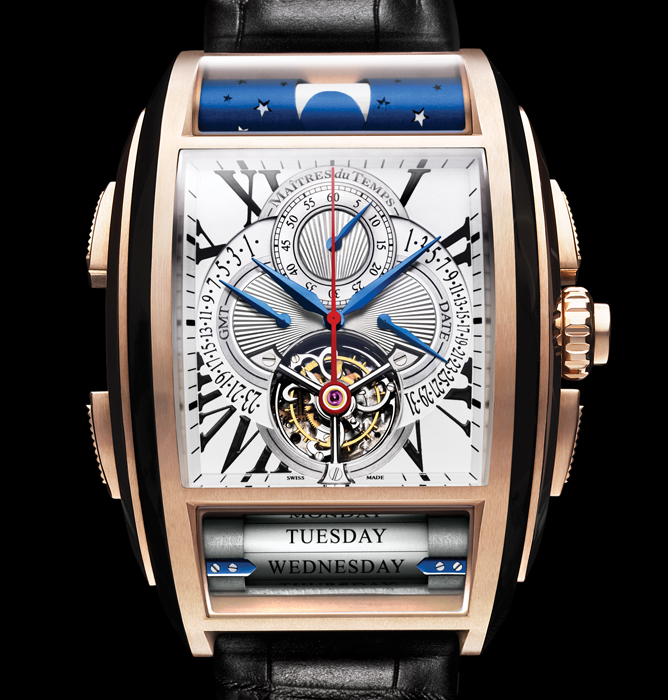
Chapter One

Chapter One was developed by watchmakers Christophe Claret, Roger Dubuis and Peter Speake-Marin, and features: Tourbillon, Monopusher Chronograph, Retrograde Date, Retrograde GMT, and two rolling bars at 6 o’clock and 12 o’clock, indicating the day of the week and the phases of the moon, respectively.

Indications: central coaxial hours, minutes, and chronograph 60-second counter, a transparent window to see the working tourbillon and a day-of-the-week roller at 6 o’clock; retrograde GMT at 9 o’clock; 60-minute chronograph counter and precision moon phase roller at 12 o’clock; and retrograde date at 3 o’clock.

=== Chapter Two ===
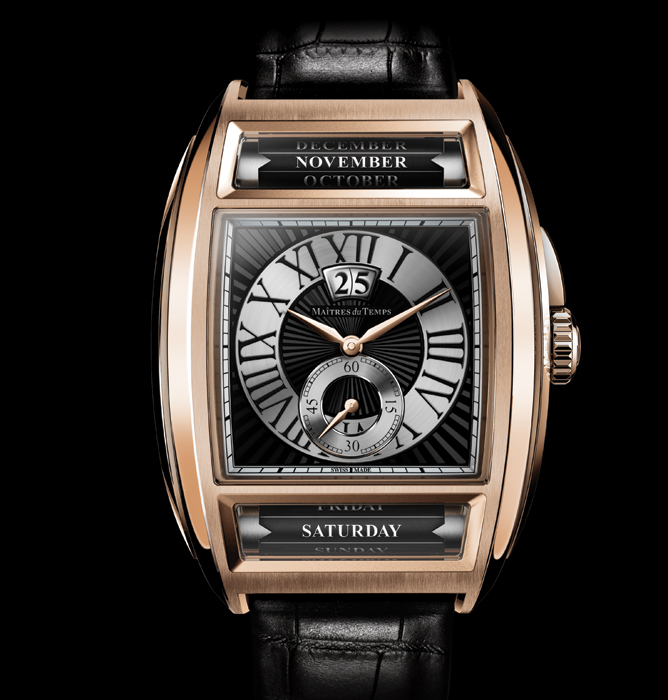
Chapter Two

Chapter Two was developed by watchmakers Daniel Roth, Peter Speake-Marin and Roger Dubuis, and is a triple calendar wristwatch with a big date and rollers indicating days and months.

Indications: central hours and minutes, big date at 12 o'clock, month on roller at 12 o'clock, sub-seconds dial at 6 o'clock and day on roller at 6 o'clock.

Chapter Two features an automatic winding mechanism and paddles to adjust the day and month rollers.

=== Chapter Three Reveal ===
The Chapter Three Reveal was introduced at BaselWorld 2012. Chapter Three was developed by watchmakers Kari Voutilainen and Andreas Strehler, and is a round, elegant wristwatch with hiding widows at "12" and "6". Indications: central hours and minutes, sub-seconds dial at 8 o'clock, date sub dial at 2 o'clock, moon phase at 4 o'clock. On a push of the crown, two windows (at 12 and 6) opens and shows the brand typical rollers. At 6 o'clock it shows a second time zone and at 12 o'clock day and nights indication corresponding to the time zone.

== Watchmakers ==
=== Peter Speake-Marin ===
Peter Speake-Marin (English) studied watchmaking at London's Hackney Technical College and continued his horological education at the Swiss watchmaking school WOSTEP.

For seven years Speake-Marin was head of the antique watch section at Somlo Antiques in London. He moved back to Switzerland in 1996 when recruited by Renaud & Papi (now Audemars Piguet Renaud & Papi SA) to develop and build high complications.

In 2000 Speake-Marin established his own atelier where he designs and creates his own Speake-Marin watches. In 2006 he worked on the Excenter Tourbillon with Harry Winston. In 2007 he collaborated with Christophe Claret and Roger Dubuis to develop Chapter One for Maîtres du Temps.

=== Christophe Claret ===
Christophe Claret (French) attended the watch school in Geneva and, upon graduation in 1987, worked alongside Roger Dubuis in the latter's atelier, and then with Dominique Renaud and Giulio Papi (now Audemars Piguet Renaud & Papi SA). In 1987 he formed his own company, Christophe Claret SA, in Le Locle, Switzerland.

Claret specializes in designing, manufacturing and assembling very complicated watches for Swiss watch brands in his comprehensively equipped, state-of-the-art workshops. He is particularly known for his chiming watches.

In 2005, Claret co-founded the ultra-high-end watch brand, Jean Dunand, with Thierry Oulevay. He collaborated with Roger Dubuis and Peter Speake-Marin at Maîtres du Temps to develop Chapter One, which was presented in Geneva in 2008.

=== Roger Dubuis ===
Roger Dubuis (Swiss) worked with a local watchmaker as a young teenager before studying at the Geneva Watchmaking School.

After 14 years of developing and restoring high complications at Patek Phillipe, Dubuis founded his own restoration and repair atelier in 1980. He co-developed, with Jean Marc Wiederrecht, the world's first perpetual calendar bi-retrograde movement for Harry Winston.

In 1995 Dubuis co-founded the watch brand Roger Dubuis SA with Carlos Dias. The two founders no longer have any affiliation with the brand, which is now majority owned by the Richemont Group. With Maîtres du Temps, Dubuis collaborated with Christophe Claret and Peter Speake-Marin to develop Chapter One, which debuted in Geneva in 2008.

=== Daniel Roth ===
Daniel Roth grew up in Nice in the south of France. He studied watchmaking there and then moved to Switzerland to further his horological education. After learning traditional watchmaking techniques at Audemars Piguet he became the master watchmaker at Breguet. The year was 1970, and the Chaumet brothers had bought Breguet, at the time virtually dormant, with the intention of reviving the brand.

After 14 years at Breguet (watch), a period in which he is credited with introducing what is now considered the "Breguet look" Roth left when the brand was sold. In 1989 he launched his own brand, Daniel Roth (sold to the Bulgari group in 2000). Roth now handcrafts traditional two-minute tourbillons under his new brand, Jean Daniel Nicolas.

=== Kari Voutilainen ===
Kari Voutilainen, born in 1962, is a Finnish watchmaker residing in Môtiers, Switzerland. He started an independent watchmaking business in 2002, building a limited number of handmade timekeepers. In 2005, he introduced the world's first decimal repeater sounding hours, ten-minute intervals and then minutes. He is a member of the AHCI.

=== Andreas Strehler ===
Andreas Strehler, born 1971 in Winterthur, Switzerland is a Swiss watchmaker and designer of watch movements. He worked about four years at Renaud & Papi (now Audemars Piguet Renaud & Papi SA) where he was responsible for the prototype department. Since 1995 he is independent watchmaker with his own watches. Beside of his own watches, he created several watch movements for brands like: Harry Winston, H. Moser & Cie., Maurice Lacroix, Chronoswiss, Vogard and "Lehmann Schramberg". He is member of the AHCI and known for his real conical gears.
