= Kari Voutilainen =

Finnish watchmaker

- Born: 2 June 1962 (age 63); Rovaniemi, Finland
- Occupation: watchmaker
- Website: http://www.voutilainen.ch/

Kari Voutilainen, AHCI (born in 1962) is a Finnish watchmaker residing in Môtiers, Switzerland. Voutilainen is generally considered to be one of the greatest living watchmakers. Altogether ten watches by Voutilainen have been awarded the Grand Prix d'Horlogerie de Genève (Geneva Watchmaking Grand Prix).

== Career ==
Voutilainen graduated from the Finnish School of Watchmaking in 1986, and later continued his studies at WOSTEP. After his studies Voutilainen worked for Parmigiani Mesure et Art du Temps between 1990 and 1999 restoring complicated and rare watches. Voutilainen also worked as a teacher at the WOSTEP between the years 1999-2002.

Voutilainen started an independent watchmaking business in 2002, building a limited number of handmade timekeepers. In 2005, he introduced the world's first decimal repeater sounding hours, ten-minute intervals and then minutes. In 2012 Voutilainen together with Andreas Strehler created the watch "Chapter III" for Maîtres du Temps.

In 2013, Voutilainen began collaborating with Tatsuo Kitamura, head of the Japanese lacquer art studio Unryuan, and by 2022 had introduced several watches with dials decorated using traditional Japanese lacquer techniques.

In 2021 Voutilainen together with a group of investors acquired watchmaking company Urban Jürgensen and was appointed as the CEO of the company.
