= Jacob Auch =

Jacob Auch was a skillful German mechanic, instrument and clock-maker, born on 22 February 1765, in Echterdingen, a town near Stuttgart. In Echterdingen from 1781 till 1790 he served the famous Philipp Matthäus Hahn. The young Jacob was an apprentice of Hahn and worked in his workshop. From 1787 Auch opened his own workshop in Vaihingen an der Enz, where he worked till 1798, and from 1798 till 1842 served as a ducal mechanic (herzoglicher Hofuhrmacher) at the Weimar court. He is well known as the author of two books on watchmaking, one of the books—Handbuch für Landuhrmacher, was published first time in 1827 and reprinted many times during the next century.

Jacob Auch died on 20 March 1842 in Weimar.
