= Académie Horlogère des Créateurs Indépendants =

Horological organization

The Académie Horlogère des Créateurs Indépendants (AHCI, English: "Academy of Independent Creators in Watchmaking") is a non-profit association, founded in 1985 by Svend Andersen and Vincent Calabrese under Swiss civil law. Its mission was to perpetuate the art of independent watch- and clock-making. The AHCI is based in Zürich.

The AHCI is an international institution with 34 Members, 7 honorary members and 6 candidates from over 12 countries.

== Goal, membership and elements ==
=== Goal of the association ===
- Promote innovation and skills in watchmaking
- Union of talents to get more presence in the public
- Create recognition for the members

The AHCI also gives the members and the candidates the chance to participate in joint exhibitions.

=== Membership ===
The following conditions are needed to become a member:

- Skills in watchmaking
- Independently develops and produces their creations
- The support of two fellow members
- The candidate has to show his pieces in at least 3 public shows
- The duration of the candidature is at least two years
- The general assembly of the AHCI has to approve the new member unanimously

The candidate doesn't need to be a watchmaker by profession. Many famous historical watchmakers has been autodidact (like John Harrison or George Daniels). For this reason the AHCI has members which are scientists or engineers. Only the skills count.

=== Elements ===
The central element is the general assembly. The members meets twice a year, in spring at BaselWorld and in autumn at a central meeting location.

== Members ==
The most famous members are the founders and the honorary members George Daniels, Jean Kazes and Peter Schmid. The following members are part of the executive board: Becsei, Eszter; Bray, Robert; Candaux, David; Chaykin, Konstantin; Lederer, Bernhard; Rigotto, Alessandro.

=== Members ===
Andersen, Svend; Andersen, Søren; Asaoka, Hajime; Baumgartner, Felix; Becsei, Aaron; Bray, Robert; Calabrese, Vincent; Chaykin, Konstantin; Valerii Danevych; Delaloye, Nicolas; Dufour, Philippe; Eleta, Miki; Paul Gerber; Haldimann, Beat; Halter, Vianney; Jenni, Marc; Journe, François-Paul; Jutzi, Frank; Kikuno, Masahiro; Klings, Christian; Lang, Marco; Lederer, Bernhard; Ma, Xushu; McGonigle, John; Naeschke, Sebastian; Nienaber, Rainer; Pita, Aniceto; Prescher, Thomas; Preziuso, Antoine; Schlumpf, Florian; Seryn, Luděk; Speake-Marin, Peter; Strehler, Andreas; Voutilainen, Kari; Vyskocil, Volker; Wurtz, Philippe

=== Honorary members ===
Daniels, George; Kazes, Jean; Naeschke, Matthias; Schmid, Peter; Snétivy, Joseph; Tai Yu, Kiu; Van der Klaauw, Christian; Wibmer, Peter;

== links ==
- Webauftritt der AHCI
- Unruh-Stifter, Manager Magazin, July 2004
- 20th anniversary of the AHCI, Ian Skellern – march 2006
