= Speake-Marin =

Watch maker in Geneva

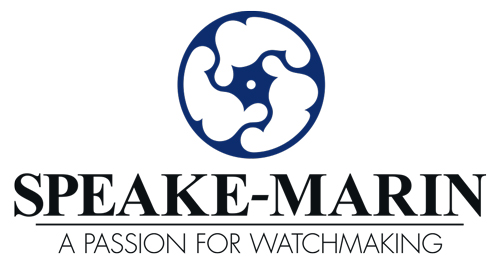
- Type: Swiss watch brand
- Industry: Watch Making
- Founded: Bursins, Switzerland (2002; 24 years ago)
- Founder: Peter Speake-Marin
- Headquarters: Geneva, Switzerland
- Area served: Worldwide
- Key people: Christelle Rosnoblet (CEO)
- Products: Luxury Timepieces
- Website: www.speake-marin.com

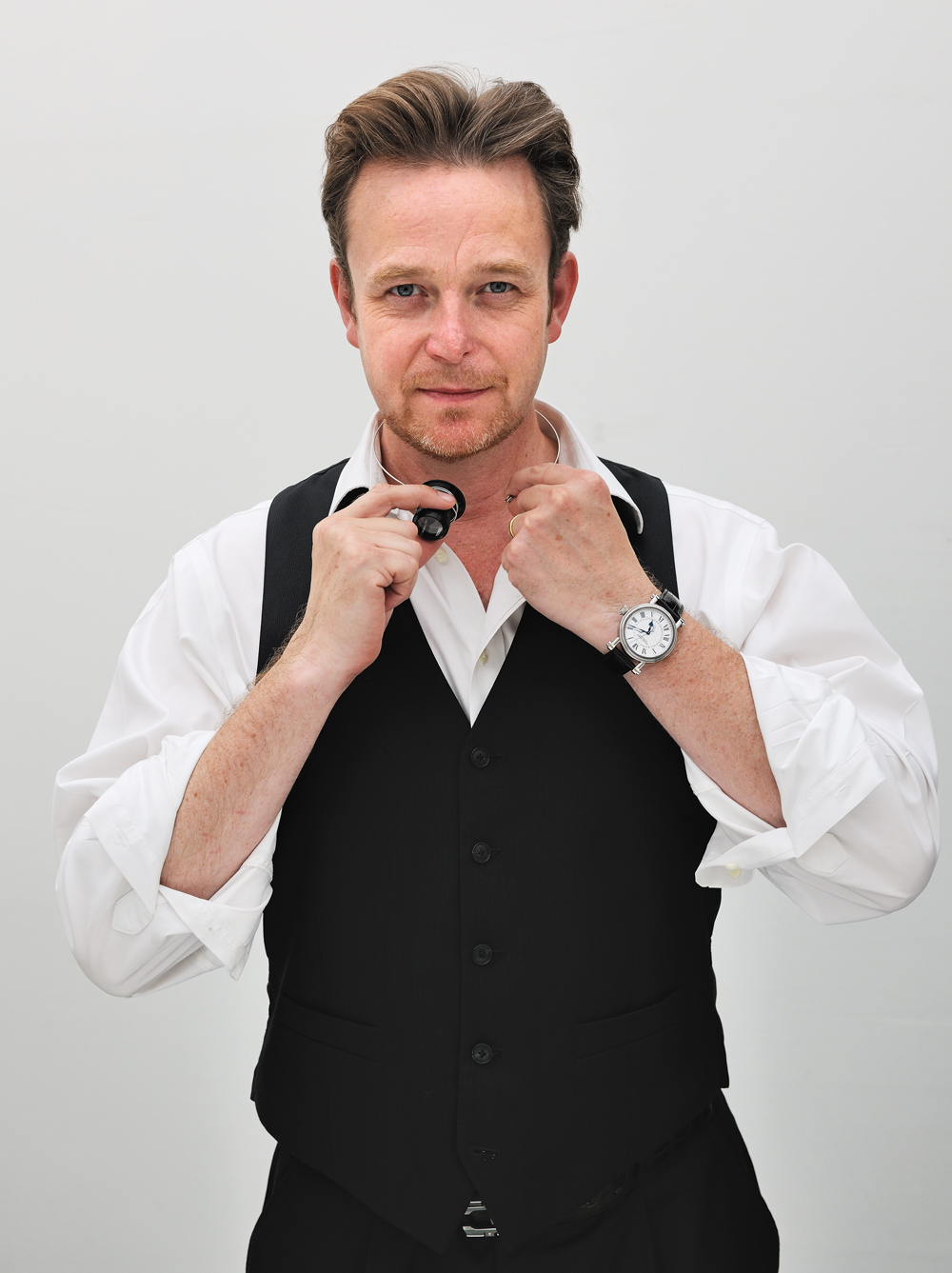
Peter Speake-Marin

Speake-Marin is a watchmaking company specializing in high luxury timepieces. It was founded in 2002 by English watchmaker Peter Speake-Marin and is based in Geneva, Switzerland.

== History ==
Peter Speake-Marin was born Peter Neville Speake in 1968 in Essex, England, to an English mother and Welsh father. After graduating as a watchmaker from Hackney Technical College in London in 1985, Speake-Marin went to Switzerland to do an in-depth course in horological complications at the WOSTEP school in Neuchâtel. He then returned to London and joined Somlo Antiques, heading the antique watch restoration department. After seven years at Somlo, Speake-Marin went back to Switzerland in 1996 to develop and build high-end complications for Renaud & Papi (now Audemars Piguet Renaud & Papi SA).

Peter founded Speake-Marin SA in 2002 in Bursins Switzerland. In 2015 a new movement strategy was initiated to fully develop and assemble in-house manufacture movements within its atelier in the Neuchâtel area, Switzerland. Peter Speake-Marin left the company in 2017 and was replaced by the actual CEO, Christelle Rosnoblet (already administrator since 2012) and an owner of the company. In 2019, the headquarters were moved from Bursins to Geneva.

== Key Timepieces ==
Since the launch of Speake-Marin, the Speake-Marin collection has grown from time-only wristwatches to include models with a single hand; date; jumping hours; perpetual calendars; tourbillons and minute repeaters; while featuring fired-enamel; semi-skeletonised; hand-engraved; and multi-level dials.

== The Foundation Watch ==
The first timepiece to bear the Speake-Marin name was a hand-made tourbillon pocket watch, called the Foundation Watch because it formed a template for future Speake-Marin watches through the spade-shaped hands and pleated crown, watchmaker’s topping-tool motif, (here in the shape of the tourbillon cage) and hand-engraving.

Completing this unique piece helped Peter Speake-Marin to become a member of the Académie Horlogère des Créateurs Indépendants (AHCI) and it set the 'foundation' paved for the Speake-Marin collection.

== The Original Piccadilly ==
Launched in 2002, Peter Speake-Marin’s first wristwatch was the Piccadilly. Various Piccadilly series and unique pieces have been created since, the first of which was the Original Piccadilly featuring enamel dial.

The Piccadilly case features screwed lugs, pleated crown and a drum-like case shape, which was inspired by the movement holders Peter Speake-Marin worked while at Renaud & Papi, and named after his seven years in antique restoration at Somlo in Piccadilly, London.

== Marin 1 Mk I ==
Launched in 2009, the Marin 1 features Speake-Marin's first in-house movement, a grade 5 titanium case, flame-blued hands, two-piece oven-fired enamel dial and stainless steel Piccadilly case. Its three concentric rings for the minutes were inspired by early pocket watch chronographs.

Marin 1 Mk I was the first Speake-Marin model to feature the SM2 calibre, an in-house calibre, designed and manufactured by Speake-Marin. It took three years to develop.

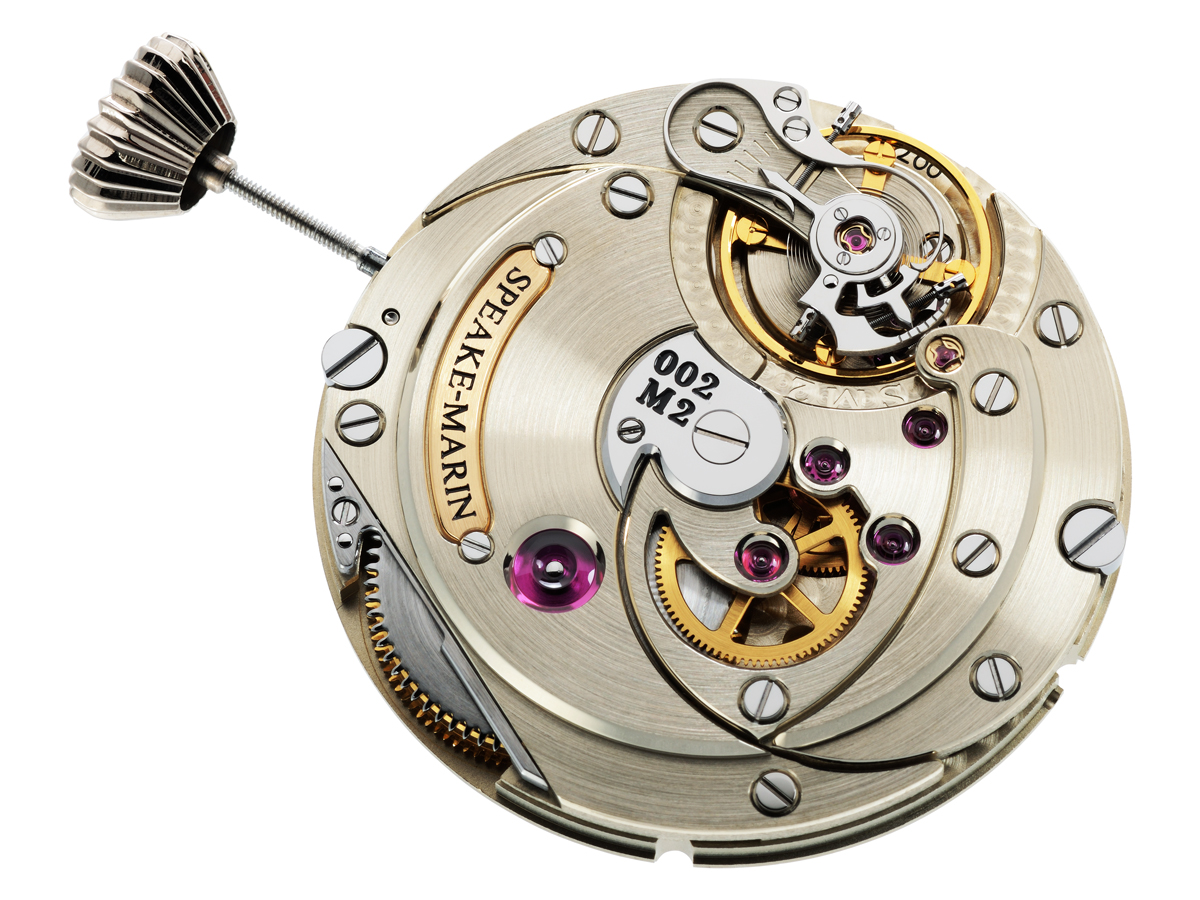
SM2 movement

The SM2 Calibre has been described as a “watchmaker’s movement”

The balance wheel is large (weight of balance is 0118gr inertia 25 mg.cm2) and oscillates at 21,600 vph. The plates and bridges are made in untreated German silver. All bridges, levers and the main plate are finished by hand (circling, spotting and polished). The rotor wheel angles are hand-finished then the surface is mirror-finished. All pivots are burnished. The SM2 has a power reserve of 72 hours, features 29 jewels and contains 211 components altogether.

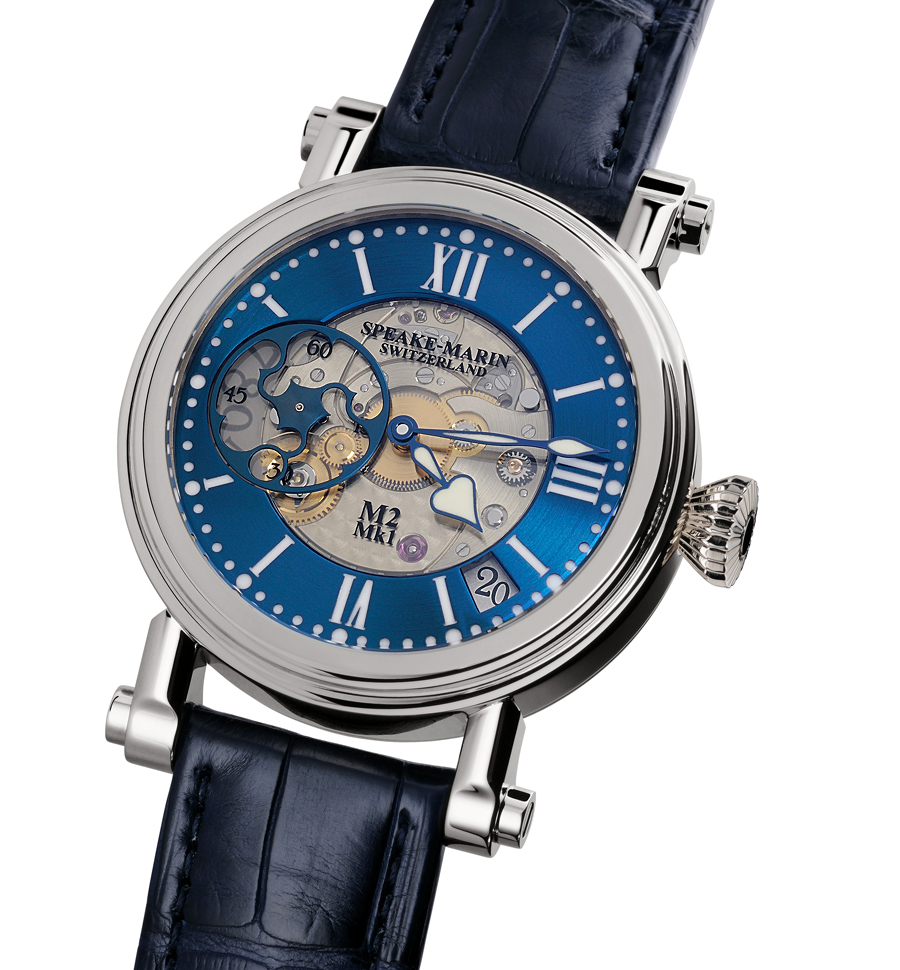
Marin 2 Thalassa

== Marin 2 Thalassa ==
In 2010, the Marin 2 Thalassa was launched featuring a hand-wound version of the SM2, the SM2m – ‘m’ standing for manual winding. The Thalassa features a blue-steel outer dial incorporating a date window, and an open inner dial through which the hand-finished movement is visible.

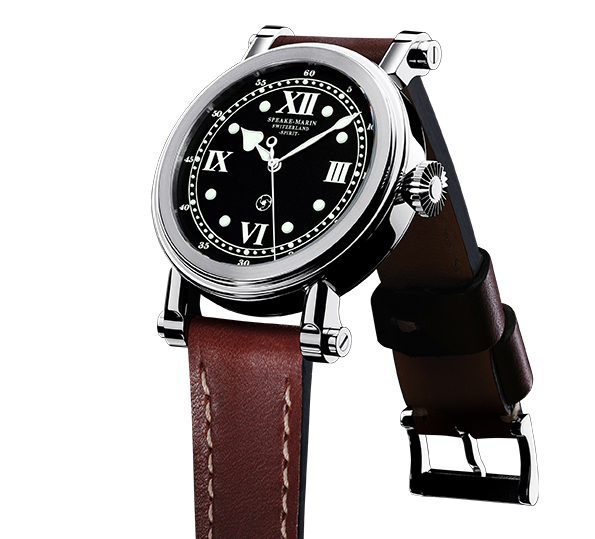
Spirit MkII

== Spirit ==
In 2011, the Spirit collection was launched with the Spirit Pioneer model. The Spirit Pioneer has a black-lacquered dial; central hour, minute and second hands; Roman and numerals at 12, 3, 6 and 9 o’clock; and four pairs of hour markers. The hands, indices and 60-minute markers have been filled with three-dimensional Super-LumiNova that glows green in the dark. The Piccadilly case is in stainless steel. There is a ‘topping tool’ mystery winding rotor for the automatic movement and a motto engraved on the case back “FIGHT, LOVE AND PERSEVERE”.

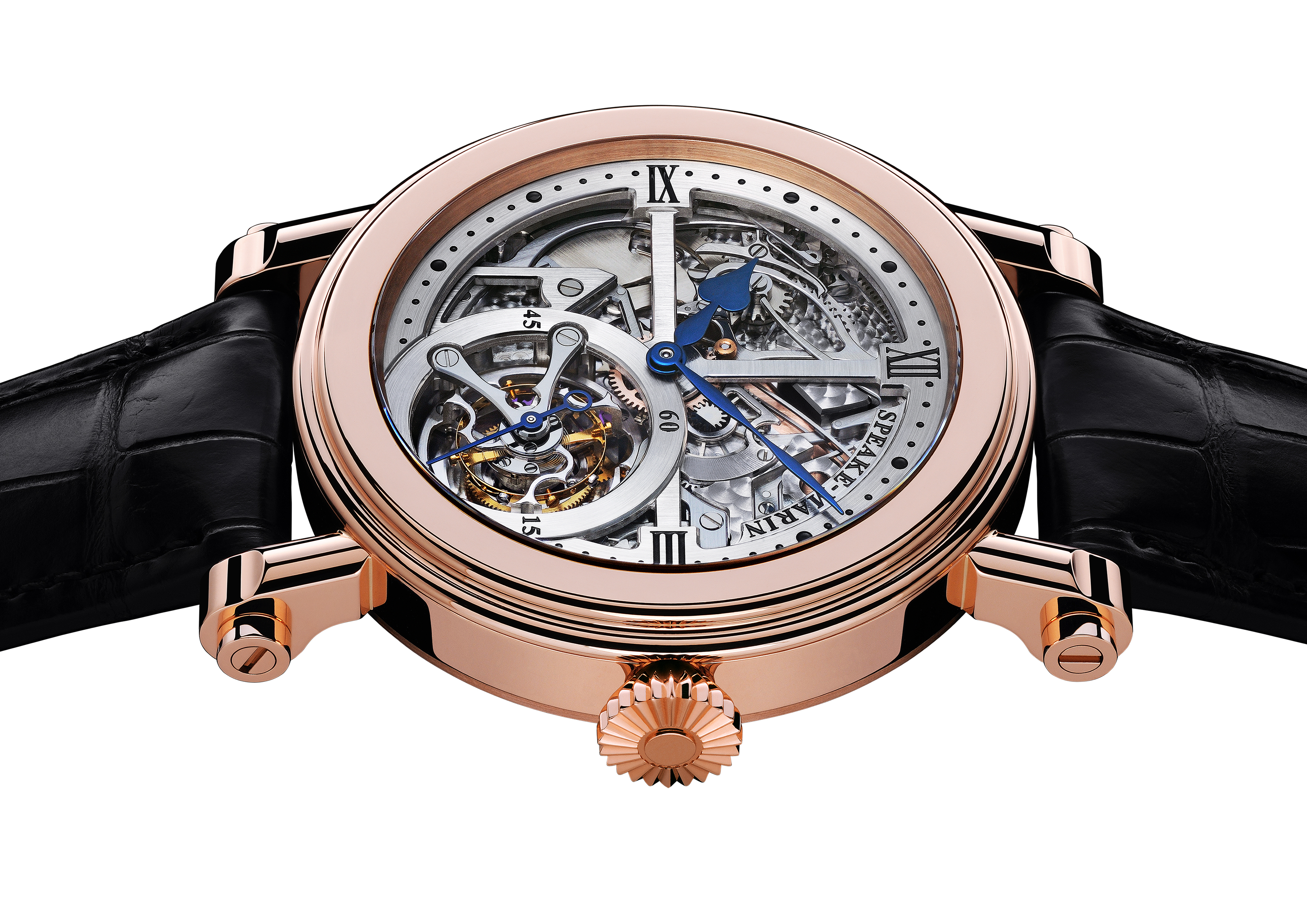
Renaissance

== Renaissance ==
The Renaissance minute-repeater tourbillon was launched in 2012. Renaissance features an open-dial, 18k red gold Piccadilly case heat-blued ‘Foundation’ hands. The 60-second tourbillon cage is in the shape of the Speake-Marin topping-tool motif. Each Renaissance is a unique piece with a different hand-engraved design on the movement.

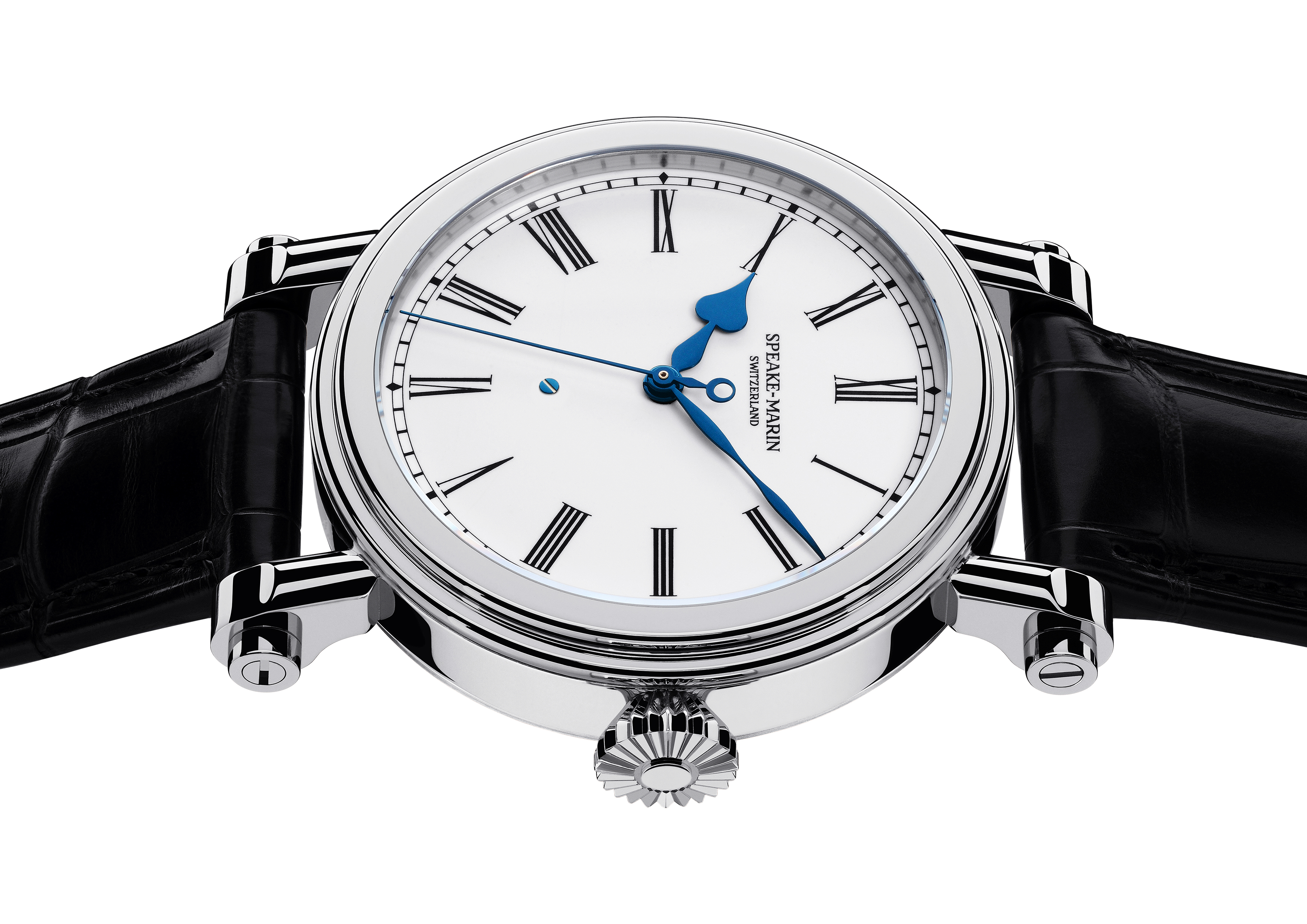
Resilience

== Resilience ==
Resilience, which has a white oven-fired vitreous enamel dial and central blued-steel hour, minute and second hands, was launched in 2012. The colour of oven-fired enamel fades extremely slowly over centuries, so keeps looking new for far longer than normal dial treatments.

== Rum ==
In 2016, Speake-Marin created 59 watches, with each one containing a single drop of The Harewood Rum 1780, the world’s oldest rum according to The Guinness World Records. The rum capsule is positioned at 11 o’clock, which is reference to an old Royal Navy tradition of providing the crew with their quota of rum at that time.

== Collaborations ==
In 2006 Peter Speake-Marin worked on the Excenter Tourbillon with Harry Winston. He was then a consultant with significant involvement in the development of movement and case, as well as responsible for final quality control, for MB&F’s Horological Machine No.1, delivered from 2007. In the same year, he collaborated with Christophe Claret and Roger Dubuis to develop Chapter One for Maitres du Temps. In 2009, with Daniel Roth, he developed Chapter Two for Maîtres du Temps.
