= George Etherington =

George Etherington was a clockmaker and watchmaker operating in London in the last quarter of the 17th century and the first quarter of the 18th century.

The date of his birth is not known, but his admission to the Clockmakers' Company took place on 1 December 1684.

Etherington is shown as living in Fleet Street with a Mr and Mrs Warton, with his workshop also in Fleet Street, at the sign of the Dial. In October 1714, he transferred to "the Dial over against the New Church in the Strand", almost certainly St Mary le Strand, which had begun to be built in that year.

On 23 July 1701, Etherington took his place as Assistant of the Court of Clockmakers Company and in September 1706, he won the election, against Dan Quare and Jonathan Puller, for the post of the "Youngest Warden". In 1707 he was elected Renter Warden, who had responsibility for handling the Company's finances and in 1708 he became Upper Warden. In what he may have considered the peak of his career, in 1709, he was chosen Master of the Clockmakers Company.

Etherington, and continued his service to the company until 1728. On 20 January 1728/29, a note in the records of the Clockmakers Company states: "Etherington dead." He was probably buried in St. Mary-le-Strand, but the burial register for that year has been lost.

His clocks are held in museum and private collections.
