= Daniel Roth (watchmaker) =

Luxury watch manufacturer

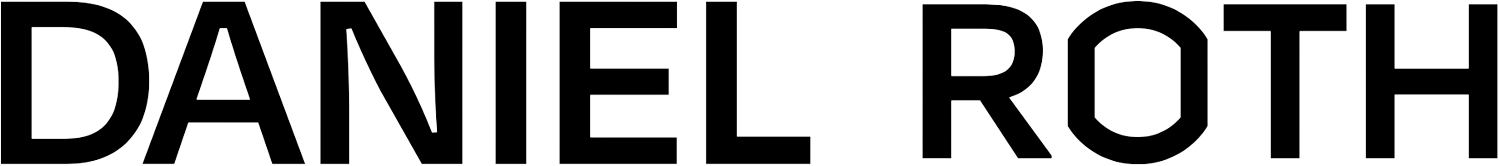
- Type: Subsidiary
- Industry: Watchmaking
- Founded: 1988
- Headquarters: Vallée de Joux, Switzerland
- Key people: Daniel Roth
- Products: Watches
- Parent: The Hour Glass; (1994–2000); Bulgari; (2000–2011); LVMH; (2011–present)
- Website: danielroth.com

Daniel Roth is a luxury watch manufacturer based in the Vallée de Joux, Switzerland. The company was created by Daniel Roth in 1989 and was acquired by the Bulgari Group in 2000.

Daniel Roth has workshops in Le Sentier as well as in Geneva, which it shares with its sister company Gerald Genta.

Daniel Roth is known for its complex and detailed watches, including a tourbillon with an 8-day power reserve, the instantaneous perpetual calendar and the Westminster Grande Sonnerie Carillon, which is the only automatic four-gong chiming wristwatch in production.

== History ==
In 2015 production of the watches stopped.

Old logo

In 2023 it was announced that the brand would be relaunched and will produce less than 100 pieces a year. The pieces will be made at the La Fabrique du Temps watch factory in Switzerland which previously only made Louis Vuitton watches.
