= Konstantin Chaykin =

Russian watchmaker

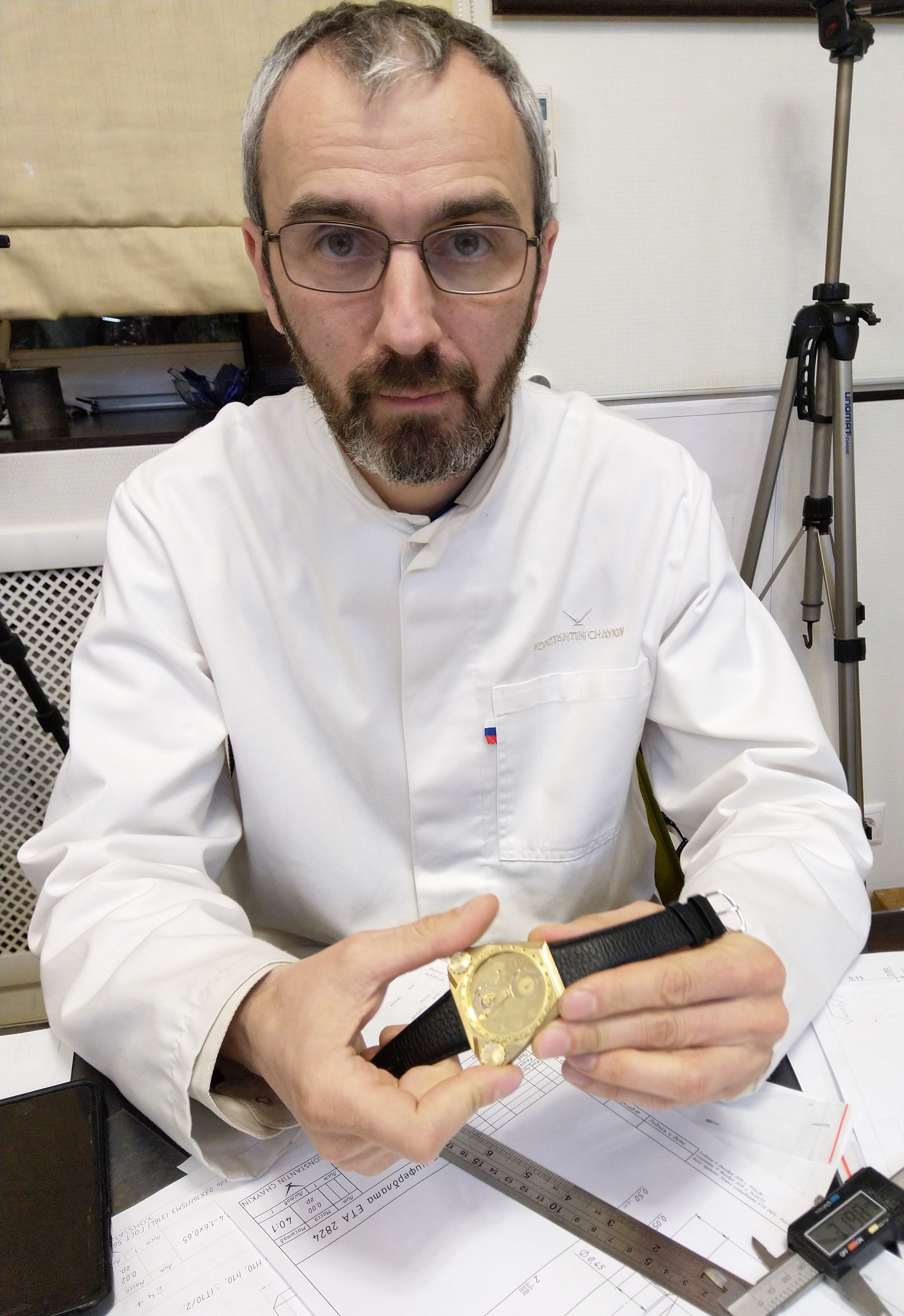
- Konstantin Chaykin in 2020, photo by Alexey Kutkovoy
- Born: 23 November 1975 (age 50); Saint-Petersburg, Russia
- Occupations: watchmaker, inventor
- Website: https://chaykin.ru/

Konstantin Chaykin (born 1975) is a Russian watchmaker, inventor and painter.

He started as an independent watchmaker in 2003, establishing a workshop in St. Petersburg, Russia. In the interests of the business, in 2012 he transferred production to Moscow, Russia, where his company currently resides. He completed his first clock in 2004. and in 2008 Académie Horlogère des Créateurs Indépendants (AHCI, English: "Academy of Independent Creators in Watchmaking") accepted him as a candidate.

Since 2010 he has been a member of the AHCI (the only such member from Russia), while in 2016 he was elected by AHCI members as the President, a position held until 2019. In October 2022, the jury of the Temporis International Awards included Konstantin Chaikin in the Temporis Hall of Fame.

== Inventions ==
Konstantin Chaykin’s first patent, RU2306618, granted to him in January 2007, protects the design of an Orthodox Easter date indicator. That has been followed by numerous other inventions, and as of early 2025, the number of Konstantin Chaykin’s registered patents exceeded one hundred.

In April 2020, the World Intellectual Property Organization (WIPO) through an application of the Federal Service for Intellectual Property (Russia) (Rospatent) awarded Konstantin Chaykin the WIPO Medal for Inventors for his contribution in the field of Technical Sciences in the Russian Federation. In 2025, Konstantin Chaikin has officially registered over a hundred patents.

== Complicated clocks ==
In 2003–2004, he built his first clock – the Foundation tourbillon clock, the first of its kind in Russia. He is the creator of several notable complicated astronomical table clocks, including four Orthodox computus clocks – the Easter of Christ Computus Clock (2005), Resurrection Computus Clock (2007), Northern Computus Clock (2015) and Moscow Computus Clock (2016), all developed based on his patents. The Moscow Computus Clock, with 27 complications and mechanisms, 2,506 movement parts, four dials and over 2,500 components in the case, is regarded as the most complicated clock ever created in Russia.

== Wristwatches ==
Konstantin Chaykin produces handcrafted wristwatches based on his patents and designs, including the Lunokhod with a large spherical moonphase indicator (2011), Levitas gentlemen’s and ladies’ watches, with transparent mysterious dials (2013), timepieces with traditional calendars – including those based on the Jewish (Decalogue collection) and Islamic (Hijra collection) calendars; the mechanical cinematograph Cinema watch (2013), the Genius Temporis watch able to display hours and minutes using a single hand (2014), and other notable timepieces.

In 2017, with the Joker watch, he launched the Wristmons (Monsters on the Wrist) collection. In 2018, with the Clown Wristmon watch, Chaykin won the Audacity prize of the Grand Prix d’Horlogerie de Genève (GPHG). His Joker Selfie piece unique sold for 70,000 Swiss francs from an estimate of 18,000–24,000 francs on November 9, 2019, at the Only Watch 2019 charity auction held in Geneva by Christie’s.

Recently he has developed timepieces with a Mars time and other cosmic functions, the Mars Conqueror Mk1 (2018) and Mars Conqueror Mk3 Fighter (2020). November 6, 2021, Christie’s held in Geneva an auction Only Watch 2021, the unique Martian Tourbillon wristwatch, made by Konstantin Chaykin for charity was sold for 290,000 Swiss francs from an estimate of 40,000–60,000 francs. It is the first wristwatch from the Russian watchmaker to have a tourbillon, and the world’s first Martian tourbillon, making a revolution every 61.65 seconds – the duration of one Mars minute.

In 2023, Konstantin Chaykin presented the Stargazer watch, his most complicated wristwatch with 17 complications and the most complicated wristwatch ever made in Russia. For this watch, the master invented three new astronomical complications: a graphic display of solar activity, a discrete moon phase display and an azimuth display for sunrise and sunset. The Konstantin Chaykin Stargazer watch was awarded Best Astronomical Complication at the Revo Awards 2023 by Revolution magazine.

In 2024, Konstantin Chaykin entered the race for the world's thinnest mechanical wristwatch, which has been taken up in recent years by Swiss brands Piaget, Richard Mille and Bulgari. The ThinKing from Chaykin, launched on August 29, 2024, is the thinnest watch in the world with a 1.65 mm thick case. On May 10, 2025, the ThinKing & PalanKing, an extra slim nickel alloy prototype wristwatch accompanied by its titanium automatic carrying base, was sold by Phillips for CHF 508,000. 2026: Chaykin wins the GPHG Audacity Prize for the second time, this time for the world’s thinnest ThinKing Mystery watch (1.65 mm thick).

== 301522 Chaykin asteroid ==
Leonid Elenin, a Russian amateur astronomer, best known for discovering five comets, and more than 500 asteroid, gave the name “Chaykin” to the asteroid 301522 (2009 FX23), which he discovered on March 22, 2009 Meanings of minor planet names: 301001–302000#522. International Astronomical Union confirmed the name in an official publication. 301522 Chaykin asteroid located in the main asteroid belt, its diameter is approximately 3.528 km, and the period is 2041.64 days (5.59 years).

== Paintings and drawings ==
Konstantin Chaykin’s passion for painting has accompanied his work as a watchmaker throughout his career, as seen in the development of his watch designs through numerous artistic sketches and drawings, which first appeared on the auction market in August 2022. In his paintings, Chaykin creates fictional characters, depicting watch parts and mechanisms that closely resemble real ones, as well as fantastical creations from his imagination. Konstantin Chaykin’s paintings have been sold at Phillips auctions, including “Thinking of the Time’s Birth” for CHF 53,340 and “Goddess of Time Tempa” for CHF 20,000.
