= Louis Zimmer =

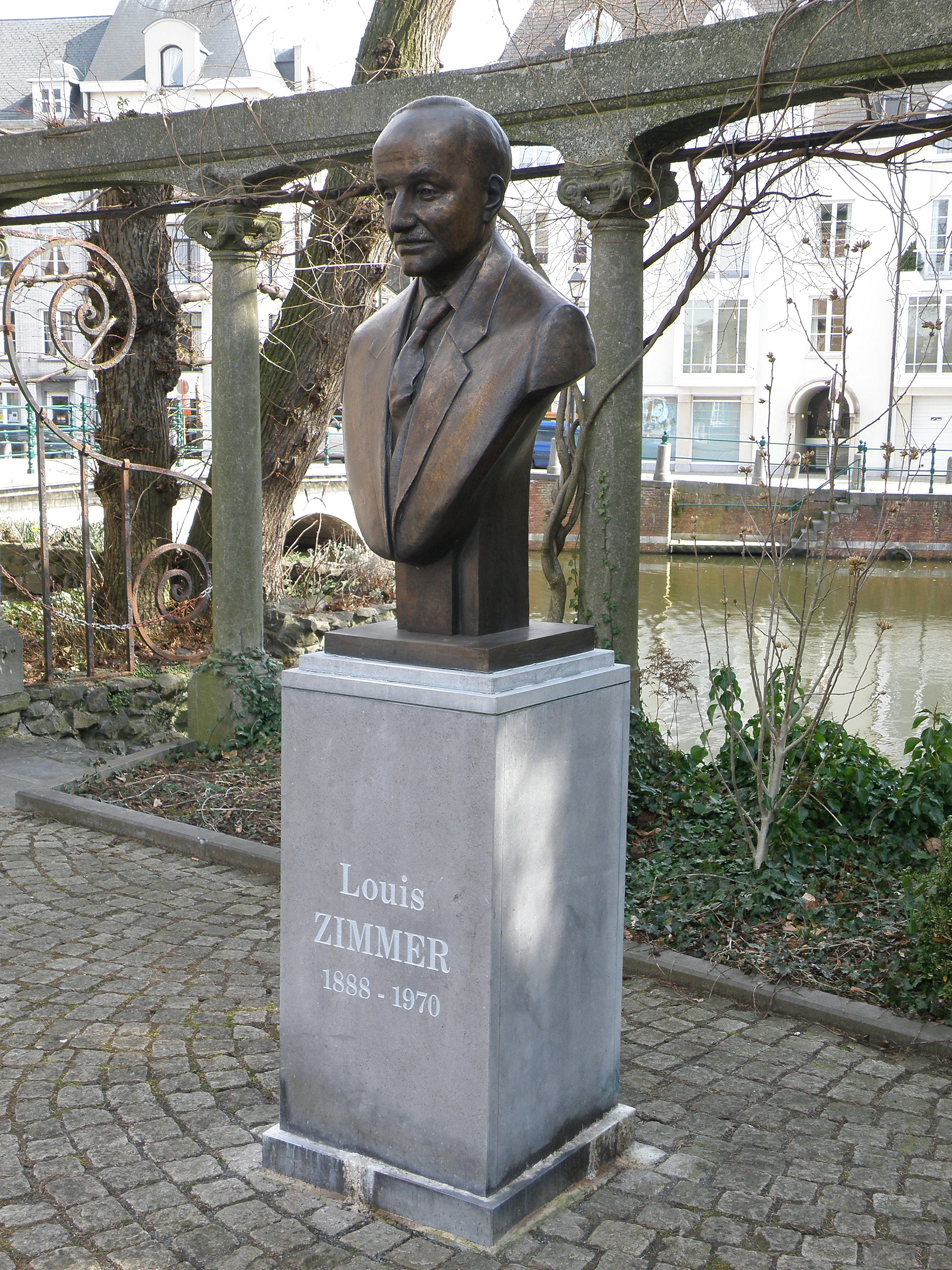
Zimmer's memorial bust

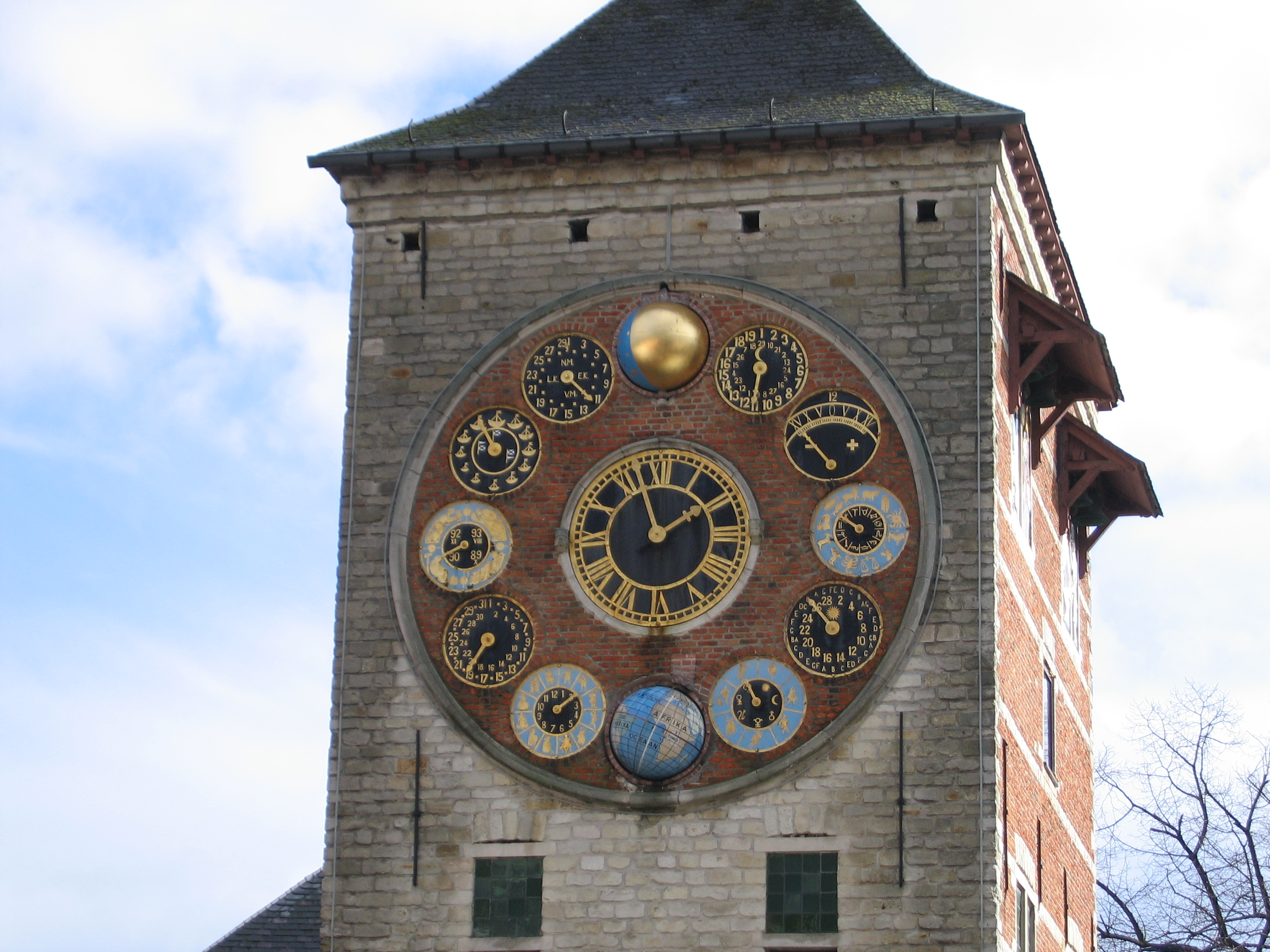
Detail view of the Jubilee clock

Louis Zimmer (8 September 1888 – 12 December 1970) was an astronomer and clockmaker to the King of Belgium. Most notably in 1930 he built the Jubilee (or Centenary) Clock, which is displayed on the front of the Zimmer tower. The Zimmer tower (Dutch: Zimmertoren) is a tower in Lier, Belgium, also known as the Cornelius tower, that was originally a keep of Lier's fourteenth-century city fortifications. In the museum near the tower in addition to many of Zimmer's other clock is the huge clock he constructed for the 1935 Brussels International Exposition. This is the clock was sent to the United States for the 1939 New York World's Fair. In June 1970 he was proclaimed Honorary Citizen of Lier. The asteroid Zimmer (№ 3064)(1984 BB1), was named after him in 1984.

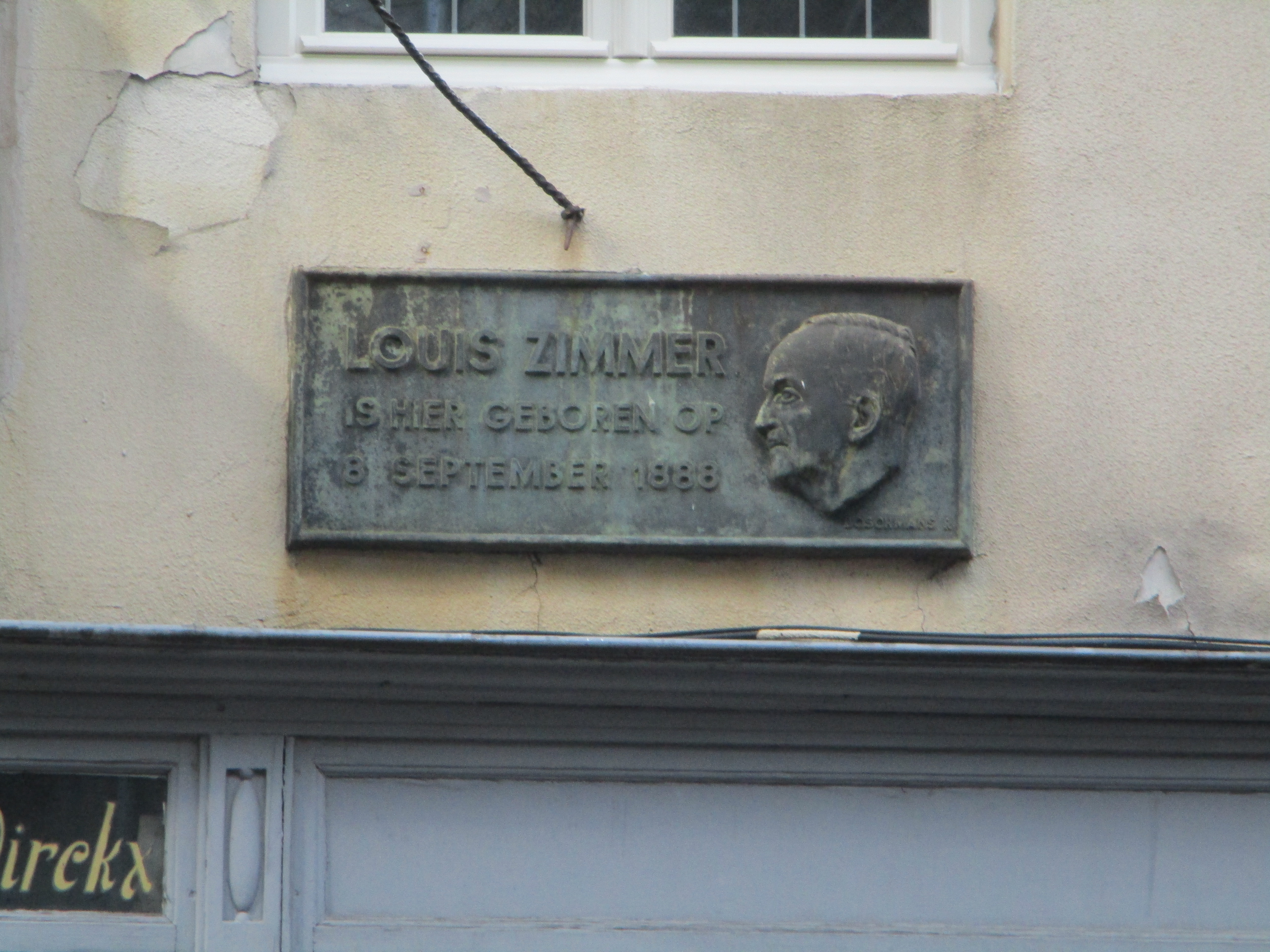
Memorial plate birthplace Louis Zimmer in Lier
