= Philipp Matthäus Hahn =

German pastor, astronomer and inventor

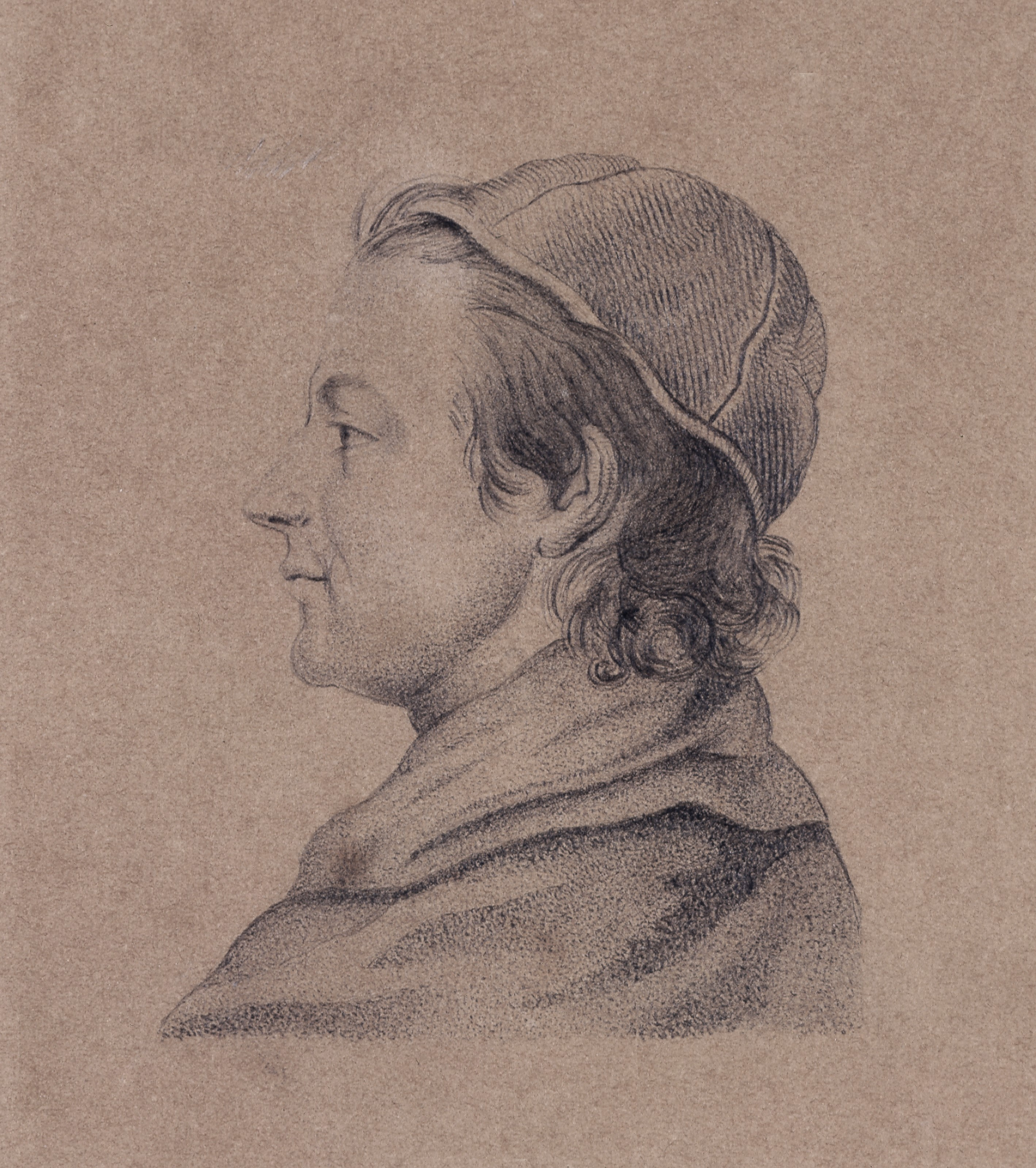
Matthäus Hahn

Philipp Matthäus Hahn (25 November 1739 in Scharnhausen (today part of Ostfildern), Duchy of Württemberg – 2 May 1790 in Echterdingen (today part of Leinfelden-Echterdingen)) was a German pastor, astronomer and inventor.

In about 1763 he devised a precision sundial, or heliochronometer that incorporated the correction for the equation of time.

In 1774 he designed one of the earliest mechanical calculators of which two are known to have survived to the present day. A renowned clockmaker, several horological museums display his works, including the Deutsches Uhrenmuseum which contains a mechanical orrery (planetarium) and a Weltmaschine by the "Priestermechaniker (priest mechanic)".

== Philipp Matthäus Hahn's influence upon Friedrich Schiller's Ode to Joy ==
According to Reinhard Breymayer, Friedrich Schiller's verses "Brüder - überm Sternenzelt/ muß ein lieber Vater wohnen" ("Brothers, above the starry canopy/ There must dwell a loving Father"), reflecting the poet's Philosophy of Love, are a reference to the astronomer and pastor Hahn's Theology of Love.

== Bibliography ==
=== Primary sources ===
- Philipp Matthäus Hahn: Kurze Beschreibung einer kleinen beweglichen Welt-Maschine.Faksimile-Neudruck der wiederentdeckten Ausgabe Konstanz, Lüdolph, 1770. Herausgegeben von Reinhard Breymayer. Mit einem Geleitwort von Alfred Munz. Tübingen : Noûs-Verlag Thomas Leon Heck, 1988. [About the astronomic machine ordered by Josef Friedrich Wilhelm, Prince of Hohenzollern-Hechingen.]
- Philipp Matthäus Hahn [Author] – Jakob Friedrich Klemm [Adjoint author]: Etwas zum Verstand des Königreichs Gottes und Christi ("Fingerzeig") * samt einem Auszug aus dem "Theologischen Notizbuch" von Philipp Matthäus Hahn mit neun ausgewählten Abhandlungen aus dem zeitlichen Umfeld der Epheserbriefauslegung von 1774. Herausgegeben von Walter Stäbler. (Stuttgart : Verein für württembergische Kirchengeschichte c/o Landeskirchliches Archiv Stuttgart), 2016 (Kleine Schriften des Vereins für württembergische Kirchengeschichte, Nr. 20). [Redaction: Reinhard Breymayer.] – ISBN 978-3-944051-11-6.
- Philipp Matthäus Hahn: Hinterlassene Schriften. Hrsg. von Christoph Ulrich Hahn. Heilbronn [am Neckar]/Rothenburg ob der Tauber, 1828.

=== Secondary sources ===
- Walter Stäbler: Pietistische Theologie im Verhör. Das System Philipp Matthäus Hahns und seine Beanstandung durch das württembergische Konsistorium. Stuttgart: Calwer Verlag, 1992. – Ev.-Theol. Diss. Münster in Westfalen 1990. ISBN 3-7668-3130-5
- Philipp Matthäus Hahn 1739–1790. Pfarrer, Astronom, Ingenieur, Unternehmer. Teil 1: Katalog; Teil 2: Aufsätze. Stuttgart : Württembergisches Landesmuseum Stuttgart, 1989.
- Reinhard Breymayer: "Anfangs glaubte ich die Bengelische [d. i. von Johann Albrecht Bengel stammende] Erklärung ganz ..." Philipp Matthäus Hahns Weg zu seinem wiederentdeckten "Versuch einer neuen Erklärung der Offenbarung Johannis" <1785>. In: Pietismus und Neuzeit. Ein Jahrbuch zur Geschichte des neueren Protestantismus. Im Auftrag der Historischen Kommission zur Erforschung des Pietismus herausgegeben von Martin Brecht, Friedrich de Boor, Klaus Deppermann, Ulrich Gäbler, Hartmut Lehmann und Johannes [Christian] Wallmann, Band 15 (1989). Schwerpunkt: Die Gemeinschaftsbewegung. Göttingen (1989), pp. 172–219.
- Günther Schweizer: Familie, Vorfahren und Verwandte von Philipp Matthäus Hahn. Pfarrer, Astronom, Ingenieur und Unternehmer. 1739–1790. Herausgegeben vom Förderverein Stadtmuseum Leinfelden-Echterdingen e. V. (Tübingen: Prof. Dr. Günther Schweizer, 2006.) (Schriftenreihe des Fördervereins Stadtmuseum Leinfelden-Echterdingen e. V., Band 2). ISBN 3-00-020221-8.
- Werner Raupp: Art. Hahn, Philipp Matthäus (1739–1790). – In: Heiner F. Klemme und Manfred Kuehn (General Editors), The Dictionary of Eighteenth-Century German Philosophers. Vol. 2, London/New York 2010, p. 443–445.
