= Andreas Strehler =

Swiss watchmaker

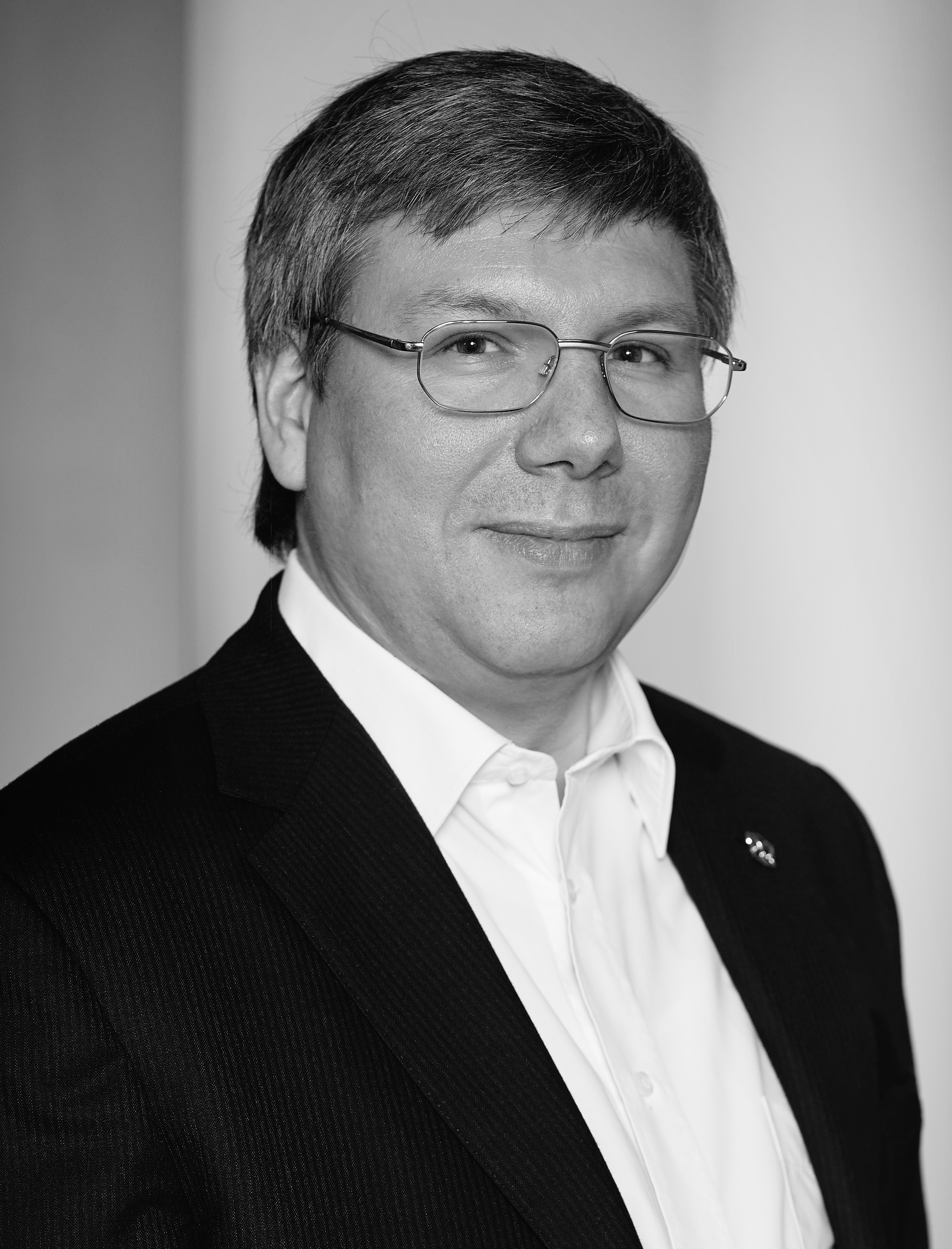
Andreas Strehler (2015)

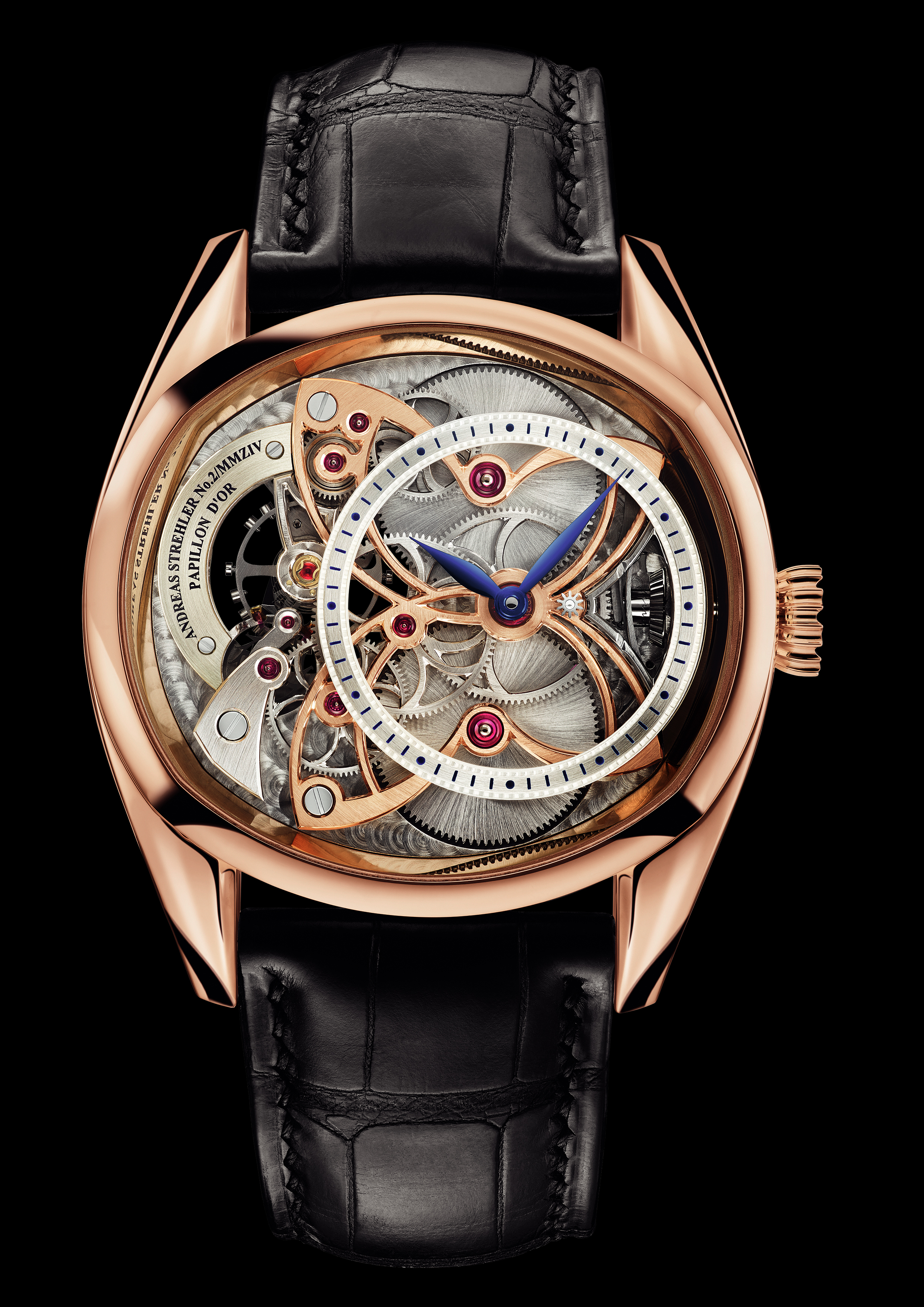
Andreas Strehler, Papillon d'Or 18K gold, front view

Andreas Strehler (born 1971 in Winterthur, Switzerland) is a Swiss watchmaker and designer of watch movements.

== Life ==
Andreas Strehler did his apprenticeship at a watchmaker's shop in Frauenfeld and graduated as Watchmaker-Rhabilleur with a Swiss Federal Diploma in 1991. At the same time, he attended the Watchmakers' School in Solothurn. After graduation, he began his first job in Le Locle at Renaud & Papi SA which today belongs to Audemars Piguet as Audemars Piguet Renaud & Papi SA. There, he was the first watchmaker the owners had hired. Strehler is appointed as head of prototyping and in charge of implementing the firm's technical innovations. At the end of 1994, he leaves Renaud & Papi and moves back to his native Wülflingen near Winterthur.

On January first 1995, Strehler opens his own workshop. Initially, like many of his peers, he concentrates on repairing and restoring old watches and clocks.

In 2000 is appointed as member of the Académie Horlogère des Créateurs Indépendants (AHCI)

In 2005, he incorporates UhrTeil AG, a company under whose name he works for the watch industry. The name UhrTeil plays with the German words Uhr Teil (watch part) and Urteil (verdict). Besides the engineering of components, complications and complete movements, Strehler's company also manufactures the components which have been developed in house on machines, some of which have been developed by Strehler. The portfolio includes the manufacturing of prototypes and small and large series for many well-known watch brands.

In 2007 Andreas Strehler moves his domicile and the company to Sirnach in the canton Thurgau near Lake Constance.

== Work ==
In 1998, Strehler presents the "Tischkalender" (table calendar), his first clock. The table clock with perpetual calendar incorporates a removable pocket watch. If the pocket watch is inserted into the desk unit, the lattes perpetual calendar is synchronized. Several safety features prevent maloperation. Each "Tischkalender" works according to the principle of lock and key only with a specific matching pocket watch. The desktop calendar has its own spring to switch the calendar display but does not work independently. If the owner and his pocket watch are away, time stands still. Upon return of the owner and after reinserting the pocket watch, the desktop calendar detects how many days have passed and moves the date indication to the correct date.

In 1999, Strehler presents a second pocket watch, the "Zwei" (German: Two). This features a switchable indication. At the push of a button, the hands of the watch indicate the date (minute hand) and the month (hour hand). The hands move independently and will always reach their position in the shortest way. For this mechanism, Strehler receives his first patent. In 2001, Strehler implements the mechanism of the "Zwei" in a wristwatch. For this, he miniaturised the mechanism designed for a pocket watch to fit into a wristwatch.

In the years from 2003 to 2011, Strehler developed the movements for the newly founded brand H. Moser & Cie. in Schaffhausen. Among these movements are the Perpetual Moon (phase of the moon) with a deviation of only one day in 1,000 years and the Perpetual One, a perpetual calendar with a large date indication on the three o'clock position. A further particular feature of this movement is called Flash-Calendar, the instantaneous switching from the last day of the month to the first day of the next month, i.e. from 29 February to 1 March [5].

In 2007, Strehler in collaboration with Harry Winston designs the movement for the Opus 7 [6]. The Opus 7 is a further development of the "Zwei".

In 2008, Strehler presents the "Papillon" (French: Butterfly), a new wristwatch incorporating many of his trademark construction principles to achieve an open, living movement and allowing an insight deep into the movement's workings. With the "Cocon" (French: Cocoon), presented in 2012, a new line of watches is launched. The "Cocon" case is used as a basis for further developments and new models.

In 2013, the "Sauterelle" (French: Grasshopper) is presented. It features Strehler's own constant force device, a so-called rémontoir d’égalité, which supplies the escapement with constant energy. By this device, irregularities which are inherent to any movement are virtually eliminated and a linear amplitude of the balance wheel is achieved for the whole duration of the mainspring's capacity of 78 hours. The remontoir d’égalité is patented.CH707938 (A2)

On SalonQP in London in November 2014, the "Sauterelle à lune perpétuélle" is being launched. It is the most precise phase of the moon indication with a deviation of one day in 2'060'757 years. The "Sauterelle à lune" is awarded a Guinness World Record: "Sauterelle à lune perpétuelle by Andreas Strehler (Switzerland), with a deviation of 1 day in 2'060'757 years, as validated in November 2014".

In 2015, Strehler presents the "Papillon d’Or"" (French: golden butterfly). Under a butterfly bridge made of 18k gold, the movement's delicate mechanism is completely visible. On the back of the movement, the power reserve is indicated by a mechanism incorporating a micro differential gear.

== Awards ==
In 2013, Strehler was awarded the Prix Gaïa of the International Museum of Horology (MIH) in La Chaux-de-Fonds in the category artesanat-création for his technical and artistic creations.
