= Parmigiani Fleurier =

Swiss luxury watchmaker brand

Parmigiani Fleurier SA
- Type: Private
- Industry: Watchmaking
- Founded: 1996; 30 years ago
- Founder: Michel Parmigiani
- Headquarters: Fleurier, Switzerland
- Key people: Guido Terreni (CEO)
- Products: Watches
- Parent: Sandoz Family Foundation
- Website: www.parmigiani.com

Parmigiani Fleurier SA (French pronunciation: [paʁmiʒani flœʁje]) is a Swiss brand of luxury watchmakers founded in 1996 in Fleurier by Michel Parmigiani. In 2006, Parmigiani produced the Bugatti 370, a driving watch which won the 2006 "Watch of the Year Award" from the Japanese press, supposedly based on the Bugatti Veyron supercar.

The company is owned by the Sandoz Family Foundation. Guido Terreni is the CEO of the company since January 2021.

== History ==
Parmigiani Fleurier was started in 1996 in Val-de-Travers. Founder Michel Parmigiani had conceived the brand in 1976 through his work restoring watchmaking artifacts, and his knowledge of historical mechanical clocks and watches. The Parmigiani restoration workshop worked with the Sandoz family to restore the collection of the Room Maurice Yves Sandoz of the Musée d’Horlogerie du Locle, which eventually led to the creation of the Parmigiani Fleurier.

Parmigiani's career advanced significantly with the development of the Chopard 1860, the brand's first watch with an in-house mechanical movement. Powered by the Caliber 1.96, the watch was commercially unsuccessful; however it was subsequently called one of the greatest automatic movements ever made. and was a direct precursor to the launch of the Parmigiani Fleurier brand.

In 2016, Parmigiani Fleurier unveiled the Hippologia, a 55 kg, oval-shaped table clock covered in a foil of white gold and elaborated by the French glassmaker Lalique. In December 2020, Parmigiani Fleurier made a partnership with Giorgio Armani to create the Giorgio Armani Fine Watches collection which was to be launched by the end of 2021. In January 2021, Guido Terreni replaced Davide Traxler as CEO of the company.

== Watches ==
Parmigiani offers watches aimed at both men and women. All Parmigiani Fleurier watches are hand-made, each taking at least four hundred hours assemble; they are constructed with precious metals and precious or semi-precious stones. In order to create exclusivity, only a few thousand pieces are produced every year. Their watch lines include the Toric, Forma (renamed Kalpa) and the single watch, the Bugatti 370.

In 2006, the Bugatti 370 was awarded the "Watch of the Year" award by the Japanese Press. The watch is a driving watch based on the Bugatti Veyron supercar. It was designed to look like a transversal engine, and is mounted in 18 carat gold. In order to make it readable while driving, the face of the watch is placed in a vertical position on the case's front. The first Bugatti watch was given to car enthusiast Ralph Lauren. Only one hundred and fifty of the watches will be made each year, fifty of each of the three dial colors available. The watch will cost USD$200,000. In 2009, Parmigiani Fleurier and Pershing, an Italian yacht company, announced that they will be offering the first Pershing Aquatic sport watches. The watch will be available as a limited edition, and the Pershing Chronographs collection..

== Senfine concept ==
In 2016, Parmigiani-Fleurier presents the Senfine concept housing a new escapement taking advantage of the properties of silicon flat springs. The revolutionary concept uses an oscillator with high frequency and low amplitude for enhanced precision and power reserve.

== See also ==
- List of watch manufactures
