= F. P. Journe =

Swiss watch company

Montres Journe SA

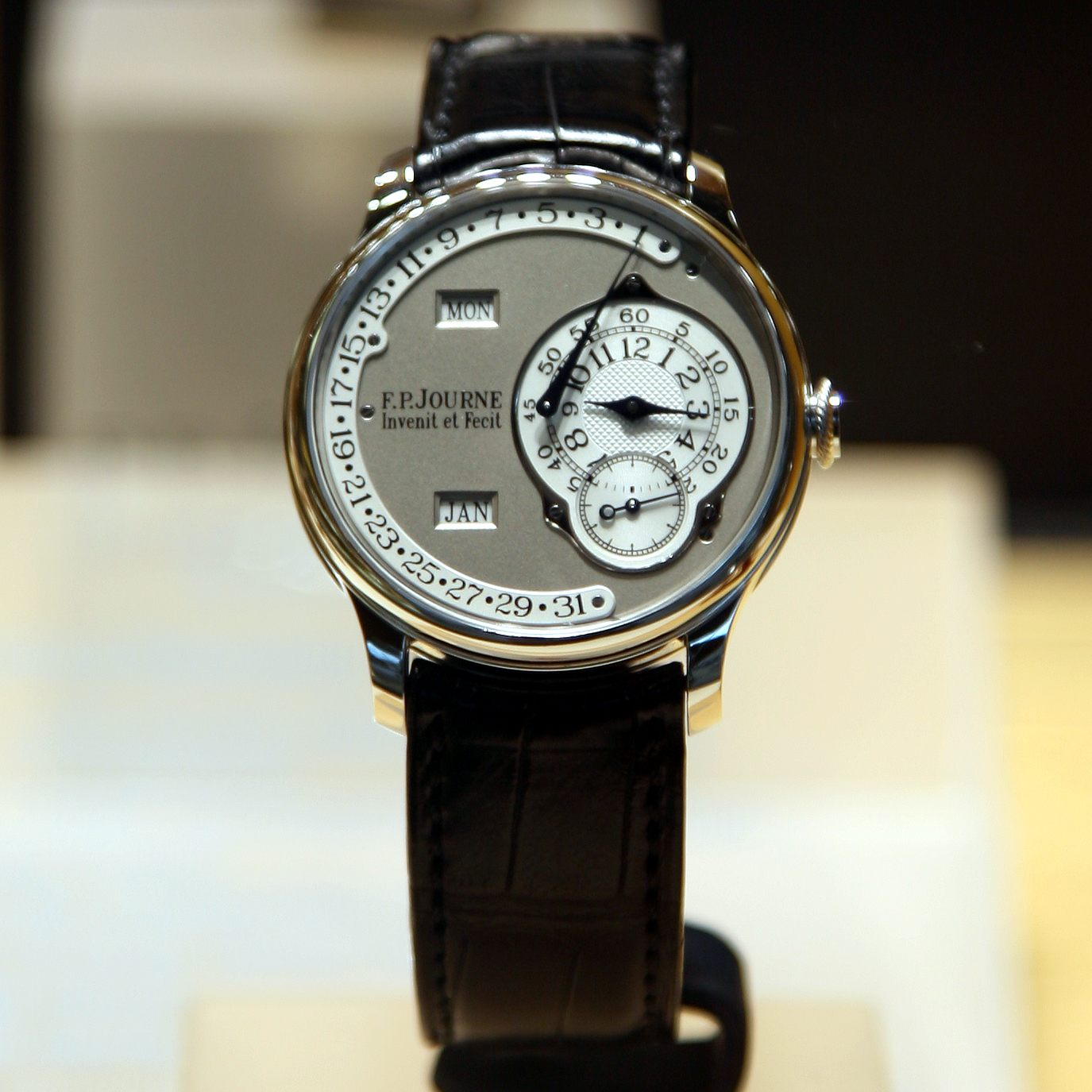
- Type: Private (SA)
- Industry: Designer watchmaking
- Founded: Geneva, Switzerland; 1999; 27 years ago
- Founders: François-Paul Journe
- Headquarters: Geneva, Switzerland
- Area served: Worldwide
- Products: luxury watches
- Production output: 900-1000 pieces (2023)
- Number of employees: 150-200
- Website: www.fpjourne.com/en

F. P. Journe (officially Montres Journe SA) is a Swiss luxury watch manufacture d'horlogerie founded in 1999 by François-Paul Journe. The only three-time winner of the Aiguille d'Or grand prize from the Fondation du Grand Prix d'Horlogerie de Genève, Journe focuses on complex precision chronometers with a production of around 800 watches per year.

The company's motto, Invenit et Fecit (Latin: "[He] invented it and made it"), denotes that the company designs and builds the entirety of the watch movements.

F.P.Journe is the only watchmaker still based in central Geneva, with company headquarters, manufacturing facilities, and an exhibition space with library housed in a converted gaslamp factory in the Coulouvrenière Rois neighborhood. F.P. Journe also owns its own casemaker, Les Boîtiers de Genève, and its own dialmaker, Les Cadraniers de Genève, housed in the same facility in Meyrin, a municipality in the Canton of Geneva. In 2018, 20% of the company was acquired by Chanel for an undisclosed amount.

== History ==
François-Paul Journe was born in Marseille, France in 1957. An unruly child, he was sent to a local technical college at the age of 14. He went on to graduate from the Paris watchmaking school in 1976.

The motto of the brand, Invenit et Fecit (Latin for "[He] invented it and made it") denotes that the company designs and builds the entirety of the movements. Journe's movement designs are original and he has invented completely new systems, such as the resonance chronometer.

Journe was interviewed in 2008 by Lusso magazine. The writer, Oliver Walston, said "He welcomed me with a big smile, but perhaps this is because I already own two of his watches".

== Awards ==
F.P. Journe has won the Aiguille d'Or grand prize at the Grand Prix d'Horlogerie on three occasions: In 2004 for the Tourbillon Souverain à seconde morte, the current-generation Tourbillon Souverain with dead beat seconds; in 2006 for the Sonnerie Souverain, both a Grande Sonnerie and a Petite Sonnerie for which F.P. Journe received 10 patents; and in 2008 for the Centigraphe Souverain, a chronograph with timekeeping isolated from chronograph mechanism, allowing the chronograph to measure hundredths of a second despite a 3 Hz movement. No other manufacture has won the Aiguille d'Or more than twice.

F.P. Journe has also won four category prizes at the Grand Prix d'Horlogerie: the 2002 Special Jury Prize for the Octa Calendrier; the 2003 Men's Watch Prize for the Octa Lune; the 2005 Men's Watch Prize for the Chronomètre Souverain; and the 2010 Complicated Watch Prize for the Chronomètre à Résonance.

== Philanthropy ==
=== Only Watch ===
F.P. Journe participated in the Only Watch auction for the first time in 2015, submitting the Tourbillon Souverain Bleu - a tourbillon watch based on the Chronomètre Bleu, including a chrome blue dial and a tantalum case, the latter which is very rare for a tourbillon. As with the standard Tourbillon Souverain, it features an in-house rose gold movement and remontoire d'égalité, as well as dead beat seconds. The Tourbillon Souverain Bleu sold for CHF 550,000 at auction.

For the 2017 edition of Only Watch, F.P. Journe donated a monopusher split-seconds chronograph in 44mm with a blue dial and featuring a completely new movement that would not be used in any other F.P Journe watches. The watch sold for CHF 1,150,000 at auction, making it one of the most expensive independent wristwatches in history. F.P. Journe later released a modified version of the movement in the "lineSport"-brand Chronographe Monopoussoir Rattrapante series.

On November 6, 2021, Only Watch sold at auction the F.P. Journe x Francis Ford Coppola FFC Blue for CHF 4,500,000 (over $4,900,000), the most expensive F.P. Journe ever sold.

=== Action Innocence ===
F.P. Journe has donated watches to auctions benefiting Swiss charity Action Innocence. In 2015, a special purple dial Tourbillon Souverain raised CHF 650,000 while a special purple dial Élegante raised CHF 55,000. In 2017, a special purple dial Chronomètre Optimum sold for CHF 200,000. In 2023, a special purple dial Octa sold for 1,000,000 SFr.

== Boutiques ==
F.P. Journe watches are only available through company-owned boutiques and official retail partnerships (branded as ESPACE F.P. Journe). Their first boutique opened in Tokyo in 2003, the 20th anniversary of which was celebrated with the company's final 'limited edition' watch. In 2019, Journe inaugurated a new, larger type of boutique in downtown Miami called Maison F.P. Journe. This location replaces the former Miami-area boutiques in Boca Raton and Bal Harbour. Four years later Journe opened one in SoHo, Manhattan, replacing the former boutique on the Upper East Side. The current company-owned boutiques, listed in order of opening date, are located in:

- Tokyo, opened May 2003
- Hong Kong, opened October 2006
- Geneva, opened April 2007
- Paris, opened December 2009
- Los Angeles, opened July 2013
- Beirut, opened September 2014
- Miami , opened March 2019
- Dubai, opened October 2019
- New York City, opened April 2023
- London, opened September 2023
- Bangkok, opened January 2024

== Patrimoine Service ==
In 2016, F.P. Journe launched Patrimoine Service, an official program that acquires out-of-production watches for interested collectors. F.P. Journe purchases, authenticates, and services the watches at their Geneva headquarters, then resells the watches via their official boutiques and online platforms such as Watchbox. A new guarantee card, box, and three-year warranty accompany all watches sold via the Patrimoine Service. F.P. Journe is the first Swiss manufacture to offer such a service.

== Bibliography ==
- Shekar, Kiran (2015). F.P. Journe The First 30 Years (5th ed.). ISBN 9780692294543.
