= Macaluso =

Macaluso is a surname. Notable people with the surname include:

- Christie Macaluso (born 1945), American Roman Catholic bishop
- Damián Macaluso (born 1980), Uruguayan footballer
- Emanuele Macaluso (1924–2021), Italian trade unionist, politician, and journalist
- Jerry Macaluso (born 1967), American toy designer and film producer
- John Macaluso (born 1968), American drummer
- Joseph Macaluso (1931–2011), Canadian politician
- Leonard Macaluso, American football player
- Luigi Macaluso (1948–2010), Italian businessman
- Mike Macaluso (1951–2022), American basketball player
- Nadine Macaluso (born 1967), American psychologist
- Stefano Macaluso (born 1975), Italian businessman
