= Stefano Macaluso =

Italian businessman (born 1975)

- Born: 6 September 1975 (age 51); Casale Monferrato, Italy
- Education: Polytechnic University of Turin
- Occupations: Entrepreneur, businessman

Stefano Macaluso (born 6 September 1975 in Casale Monferrato, Italy) is an Italian businessman. He attended high school and went to university in Turin, graduating with a degree in Architecture from the Polytechnic University of Turin in 2002. While completing his university course, he also devoted some time to his passion for motorsports, competing first in the Italian Rally Championship before going on to compete in the European Rally Championship and World Rally Championship.

== Career ==
Stefano Macaluso grew up around the watchmaking industry, observing his father, Luigi Macaluso, who served as president of the Sowind Group, which includes a watchmaking manufacture and the brands Girard-Perregaux and JeanRichard.

Since 2003, he has lived in La Chaux-de-Fonds in the Swiss canton of Neuchâtel. There, he has successively held professional positions in strategic marketing, product creation and development, industrial management and in the Sales Department Direction for Girard-Perregaux. Among his achievements, he has coordinated the development of the Girard-Perregaux retail concept, from the first flagship store opened in Gstaad in 2004 to the newest boutiques opened in New York and China. Passionate about design, he puts his architect background to good use through his involvement in the product creation.

Since November 2010, Stefano Macaluso has been appointed general manager for Girard-Perregaux.

== See also ==
- Girard-Perregaux
- Sowind Group
- World Championship Motorsports
