= Bernard Cheong =

Singaporean watch collector (born 1958)

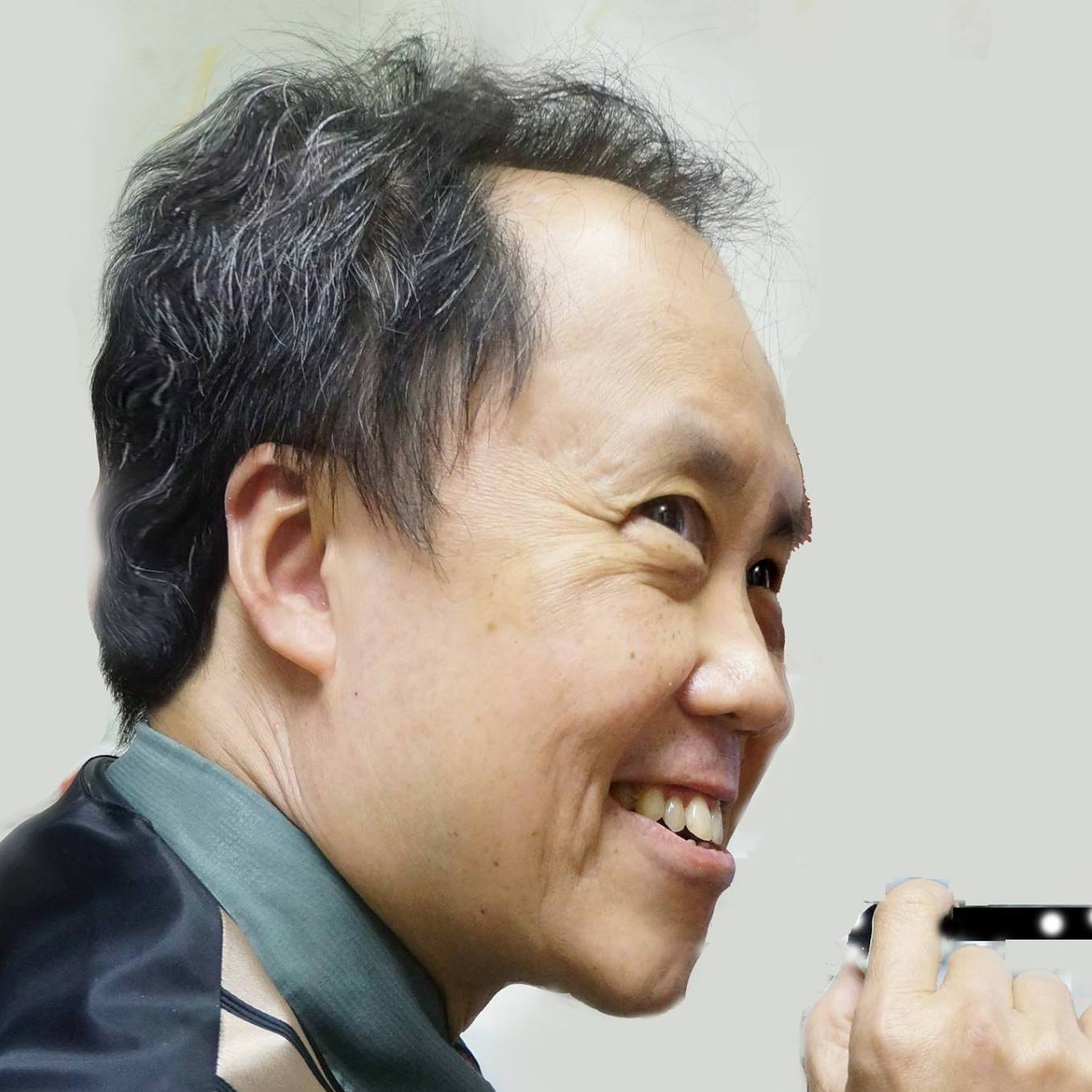
- Born: April 10, 1958 (age 68)
- Occupation: Physician
- Known for: Watch collector
- Title: CEO, Lifeline Medical Group
- Spouse: Dolly Ong
- Children: 2 daughters

Bernard Cheong (born April 10, 1958) is a Singaporean physician and watch collector.

== Medical career ==
Cheong became a medical doctor in 1982 after receiving a degree in medicine and surgery from NUS in Singapore. His earlier days were spent practicing medicine in hospitals in Singapore, and India. He subsequently became a specialist medical officer in emergency medicine, orthopaedics, paediatrics, and internal medicine before he resigned to set up his own firm. In 1987, he founded Lifeline Medical Group (YTL Community), which he expanded into one of Singapore's five largest medical groups during his twenty-three years as CEO and partner.

== Watch collecting and horology ==
Cheong began watch collecting in 1973, when his parents gave him a Flyback Seiko Chronograph.

Cheong often writes about his support of innovative, unique and controversial watches, and has claimed to have helped to bring many of them into the mainstream. When he was 23, he bought his first watch, an Omega Seamaster Titanium, while his friends opted for Rolex Submariners. His interest and passion in esoteric watches, and collecting them are thought to have evolved out of his "fascination with photography, cinema history and architecture".

Throughout the 1980s and 1990s, as Cheong grew his business, he expanded his watch collection, particularly those of academic and cultural relevance. In 1993, he directed his attention to marine chronometers and military clocks from 1940 to 1945, and in the following year, trained himself with a focus on pocket watches and their historical significance. His close friendships with innovative watchmakers, such as Rolf W. Schnyder, Vianney Halter, Maximilian Büsser, and the late Gunther Blumlein, in his early years of collecting gave him an unusual heritage of connections deep within the watch industry.

Cheong also gained attention in the watch community through sharing his insights and perspectives online. For years he has exchanged thoughts and opinions with manufacturers and other collectors on websites such as WatchProSite, ThePuristS, and Horomundi Horology-Switzerland. Cheong was part of the first team of unpaid Internet columnists in Timezone.com, and thePurists.com.

Cheong writes syndicated monthly columns translated into nine languages in twelve countries.

Since 1998, Cheong has regularly been invited to speak at financial conferences about wristwatches as portable assets. He reportedly finds watches to be much more promising, lasting and meaningful investments than wines, cars or jewelry. Due to claims that he can accurately determine what brands will rise in popularity, he has been sought after by watch collectors, connoisseurs, reviewers and investors to name the "next new wave". His focus on investing and sometimes vague connections to the watchmaking industry are however not always well-received within the collectors community, for example causing many stirs on the PuristPro forums.

In April 2008, investigative French journalists from Economie LeHepDo Paris described Cheong as one of the hidden influences in an already highly covert industry. He was to become part of the formative committee of the Grand Prix Haute Horology in Asia, and later a juror in the Geneva GPHH.
