= International Museum of Horology =

Museum in La Chaux-de-Fonds, Switzerland

- Musée International d'Horlogerie
- Location within Switzerland
- Established: 1974
- Location: La Chaux-de-Fonds, Switzerland
- Coordinates: 47.1008°N 6.8301°E
- Collection size: Horology
- Owner: City of La Chaux-de-Fonds
- Website: www.mih.ch

The Musée International d'Horlogerie (abbreviated MIH; International Watchmaking Museum) is a horological museum in La Chaux-de-Fonds, Switzerland. It is owned and operated by the city of La Chaux-de-Fonds.

The museum is dedicated to the study of time and time-measuring instruments, and holds collections of clocks and watches, marine and deck chronometers, automata, and related archives and documentation.

== History ==
In 1865 the Watchmaking School of La Chaux-de-Fonds had the idea of putting together a collection of old clocks, which was mainly used for didactic purposes. For 35 years, the clocks and watches in the collection were displayed solely for the use of students and teachers, until Maurice Picard, a Jewish French watch-making industrialist gave impetus to the idea of creating a museum. The town council was receptive to the idea, and on March 24, 1902, the town authorities signed the foundation deed of the Watchmaking Museum, originally located in the same building as the school. The collection gradually grew and the museum was enlarged three times, in 1907, 1952 and 1967.

In the early 1960s, a study commissioned by the City of La Chaux-de-Fonds and carried out by Georges-Henri Rivière, then director of the International Council of Museums (ICOM), highlighted both the importance of the collections and the need for a new building to present them. It eventually became clear that the premises were no longer suitable for a permanent and functional display of the whole collection. The Committee of the Museum therefore suggested to the Municipality of La Chaux-de-Fonds that a foundation should be set up with the purpose of promoting the construction of a new building. In 1967, the City created the Fondation Maurice Favre to support fundraising, and in 1968 the name Musée International d’Horlogerie was adopted.

Opened in 1974 under the name Musée International d’Horlogerie, the new building was characterized by avant-garde architectural and museographical concepts and techniques. The museum holds a collection of around 10,000 objects and also develops archival and documentation holdings related to time and its measurement.

In the regional context, watchmaking and art-mechanics know-how was inscribed in 2020 on UNESCO’s Representative List of the Intangible Cultural Heritage of Humanity (France and Switzerland).

Both Le Locle and its geographical twin town La Chaux-de-Fonds have now been recognised as an UNESCO World Heritage Site, for their horological and related cultural past.

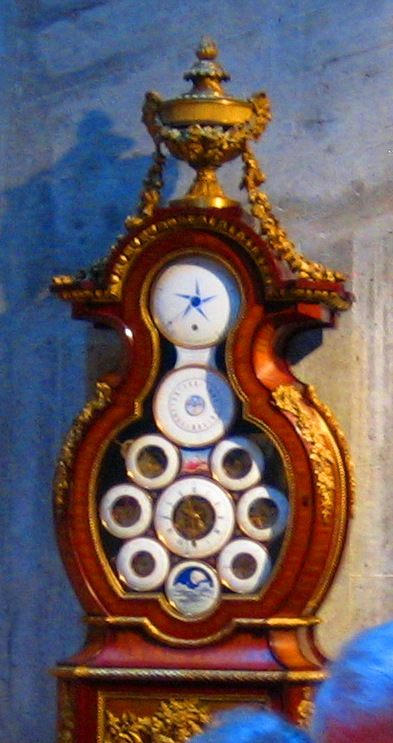
Tall case clock with multiple complications by Antide Janvier, La Chaux-de-Fonds.

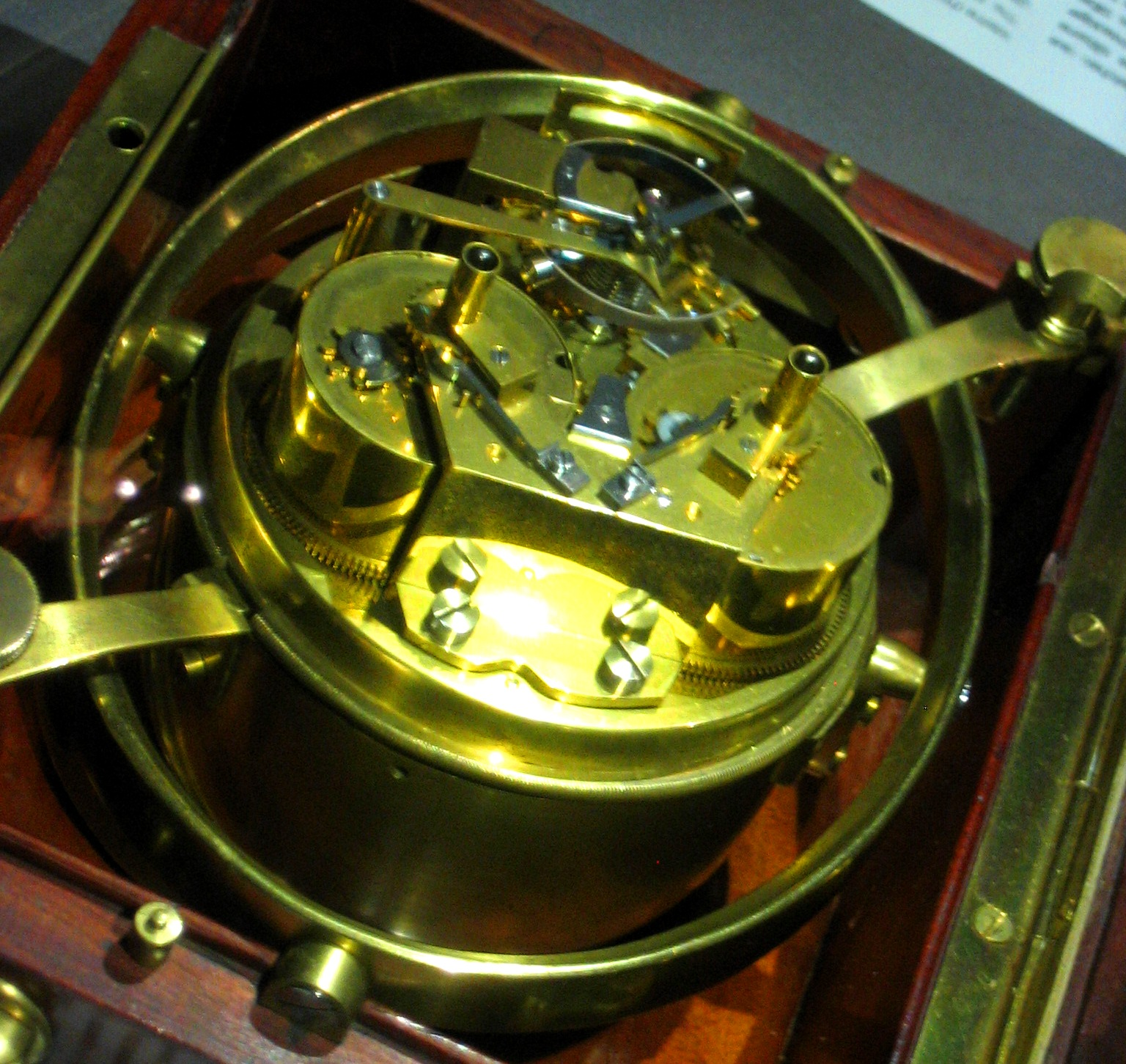
Marine Chronometer No. 3153 by Breguet & Fils, double barrels, La Chaux-de-Fonds.

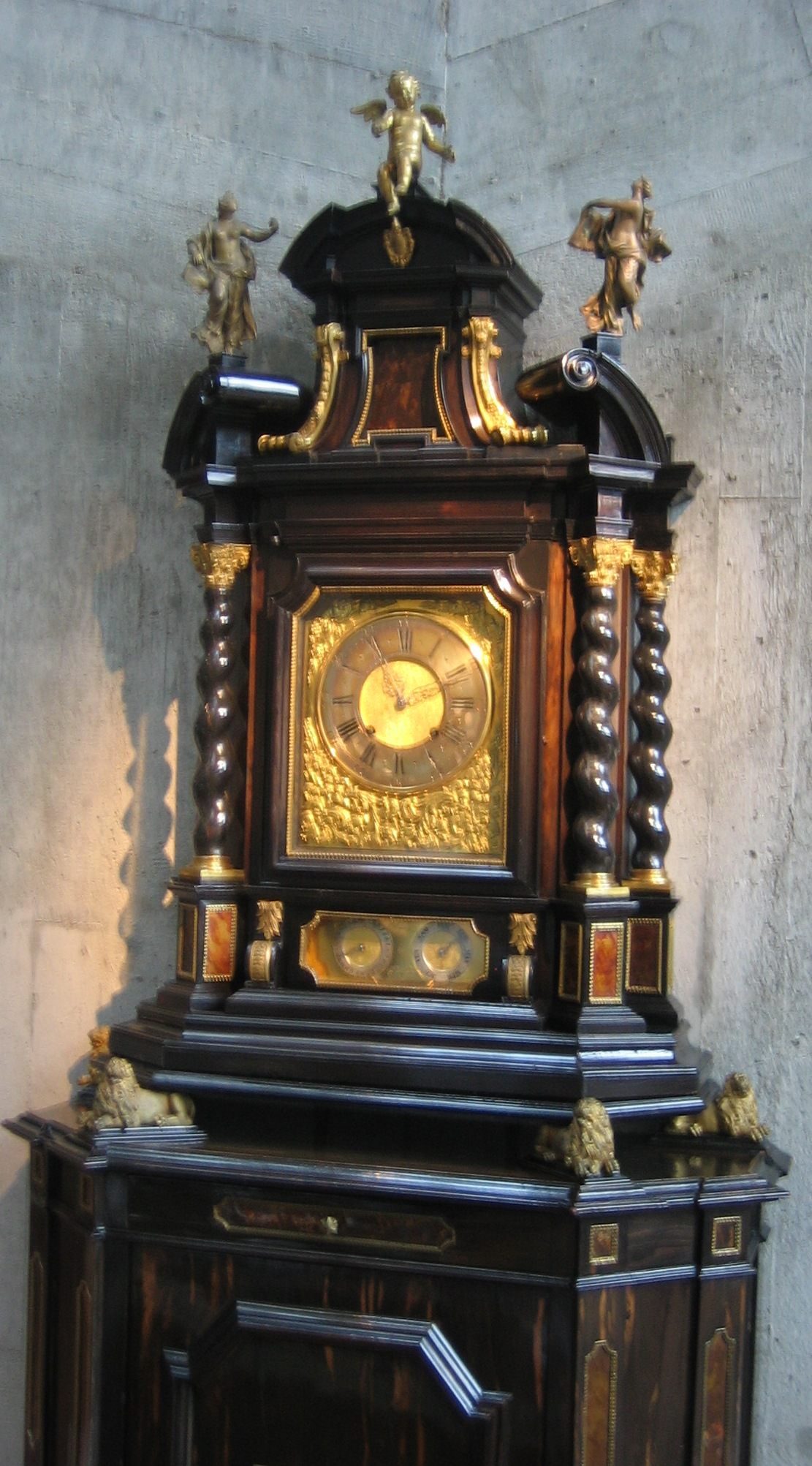
Bracket clock with base by Pierre Jaquet-Droz, La Chaux-de-Fonds.

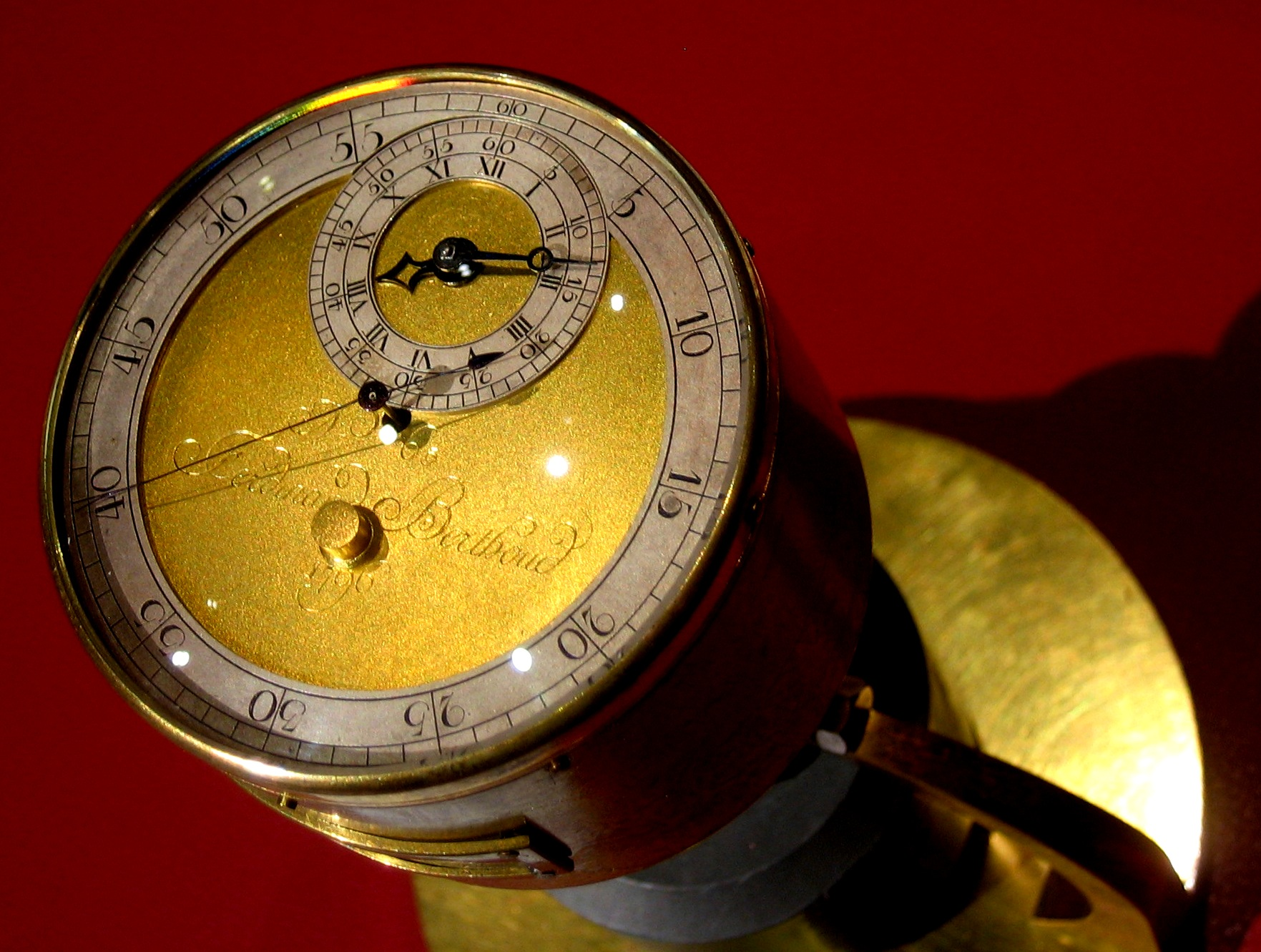
Miniature marine chronometer by Ferdinand Berthoud, La Chaux-de-Fonds.

== Building ==
Built between 1972 and 1974, the museum building was designed by the Zurich architect Pierre Zoelly and the La Chaux-de-Fonds architect Georges-J. Haefeli. It occupies an underground volume of 20,000 m^{3} (710,000 cu ft), excavated into the slope of a park. The concrete structure follows the site’s gradient and is arranged over three main subterranean levels corresponding to the principal museum zones: a hall for temporary exhibitions and assemblies; galleries dedicated to earlier periods; and areas devoted to manufacturing and decorative techniques as well as twentieth-century pieces.

Open surfaces overlooking one another create a subtly articulated space shaped by changes in level and lighting, reinforced by natural light. The museum opens to the outside through large glazed areas at the entrance, the astronomical gallery, and the restoration workshops. These glazed surfaces—along with those of the administrative pavilion and the belfry gallery—are integrated into curved walls and overhangs that project into the park.

The architects’ work was awarded the Prix de l'architecture béton 1977. In 1978 the museum received the Prix européen du musée de l'année 1977, which notably paid tribute to the museographers Serge Tcherdyne, Pierre Bataillard, and Mario Galloponi. The interior is characterized by restrained presentation, atmospheric effects, and materials chosen for elegance; indirect lighting emphasizes perspective, while spherical and cylindrical display cases echo the roundness of dials without obstructing the space.

The building has been described as a significant example of Swiss museum architecture of the 1970s, notably for its integration into the park and its use of exposed concrete. Its predominantly underground layout was intended to preserve the existing park while providing continuous, modular exhibition volumes suited to objects sensitive to light. The architectural design forms an integral part of the visitor experience, with a fluid circulation and changing levels supporting a chronological and thematic parcours dedicated to the measurement of time.

== Carillon ==
A monumental carillon by Onelio Vignando (1980) is installed on the museum forecourt. Conceived as an animated work combining bell sounds, movements of mobile elements, a soundscape, and light effects, it reflects the initial intention to make the forecourt a lively meeting point within the park. A heritage notice describes a structure 14 m (46 ft) long and 9 m (30 ft) high, resting on stainless-steel tubes, controlled by a master clock and featuring a complex programmed animation at regular intervals.

== Collections ==
The collections of the Musée International d'Horlogerie include large and medium-sized clocks, mechanical and electronic watches, marine and deck chronometers, non-mechanical time-measuring instruments, automata, and painted works.

The collection—estimated at around 10,000 objects—also includes tools, machines, and industrial objects representative of regional watchmaking heritage. In parallel, the museum develops archives and historical documentation related to time in order to illuminate not only the technical history but also the artistic, social, and economic history of watchmaking. Part of the holdings is displayed permanently; Switzerland Tourism mentions an ensemble of more than 4,500 pieces (including around 2,700 watches and 700 clocks).

Among the major pieces presented in the permanent display are:

- One of the rare reconstructions of the Astrarium by Giovanni Dondi, whose fourteenth-century conception already includes a mechanism showing the movements of the Sun, the Moon, and the planets;
- A comprehensive retrospective of the history of the Pendule neuchâteloise;
- Clocks by masters such as Breguet, Janvier, Le Roy, Robin, and others;
- An early marine chronometer made by Ferdinand Berthoud;
- Historical equipment used to manufacture parts and components for watchmaking;
- A musical clock by Pierre Jaquet-Droz;
- Clocks by makers such as Strasser & Rhodes, Sigmund Riefler, Zenith, and Fedchenko;
- Tower clocks and Comtoise clocks from Franche-Comté;
- The first documented waterproof pocket watch by West End Watch Co. called L'Imperméable;
- The pocket watch known as La Prolétaire by Georges-Frédéric Roskopf;
- Automata, including works by Pierre Jaquet-Droz;
- Three monumental frescoes by Hans Erni, La conquête du temps, produced in 1958 for the Swiss Pavilion at the 1958 Brussels World's Fair.

== Permanent exhibition ==
The permanent exhibition presents a parcours dedicated to the measurement of time, structured around both chronological and thematic approaches, from early origins to contemporary developments. It stages objects, instruments, and devices related to horology and time measurement, and includes interpretive features intended to support understanding of techniques and uses.

=== L'Homme et le Temps ===
L'Homme et le Temps is the title of a permanent display devoted to relationships between societies, cultures, and the measurement of time, in connection with the history of instruments and their uses. It reflects the museum’s mission to address time measurement not only from a technical perspective but also in its social and cultural dimensions.

=== La conquête du temps by Hans Erni ===
The works were produced in 1958, commissioned by the Chambre Suisse d’Horlogerie for the 1958 Brussels World's Fair. They decorated the watchmaking section of the Swiss Pavilion under the generic title La conquête du temps. The upper row of frescoes illustrates universal philosophies of time through scholars; the lower row depicts the emergence and development of watchmaking in Geneva and the Jura arc. Other frescoes distributed in the museum evoke modern technique.

=== Planétaire by François Ducommun ===
François Ducommun, La Chaux-de-Fonds, Planétaire, brass, cardboard, wood, oil paint, 1816, D: 120 cm. Inv. V-12.

This planetarium presents the Solar System as understood at the beginning of the nineteenth century. The globe, painted with constellation figures, contains a brass mechanism formed of two distinct parts: the calendar mechanism and the planetary display. A drawing reveals the demanding calculations undertaken by François Ducommun to complete the project. Beyond its technical qualities, the piece features a precise decorative program attributed to the painter and engraver Charles Girardet.

=== Automate Turc buvant du café ===
François Junod, Automate Turc buvant du café sur un tapis volant, gift 2015.

A contemporary electro-mechanical work, the automaton resulted from a collaboration between an artisan from Sainte-Croix and the head of a coffee-roasting company in La Chaux-de-Fonds, created in the context of celebrating the company’s centenary in 2000. Seated on an undulating carpet, the figure is fully animated. To the tune of Mozart’s Turkish March (from the Piano Sonata No. 11), the automaton pours and drinks a cup of coffee before returning to stillness. The mechanism is activated by a single coffee bean.

== Centre de restauration en horlogerie ancienne (CRH) (Centre for the Restoration of Antique Horology) ==
The restoration workshops are partly visible to visitors. The museum carries out conservation-restoration work for its own collections as well as, under strict selection criteria, for certain privately owned pieces. The work is governed by a strict restoration ethic, informed by professional exchanges, conferences, and accumulated experience regarding how to keep objects operational without altering their appearance, or how to conserve them without prioritising operation. Interventions aim to preserve original parts as much as possible, even when this entails some risk to functionality and even when restoration traces remain visible.

The CRH also plays a scientific and technical reference role, notably through systematic documentation of interventions. Restorations follow principles of reversibility and traceability aligned with international standards for heritage conservation. The CRH also contributes to the transmission of know-how linked to historical horology through public access to the workshops and collaborations with external specialists.

== Centre d'études L'Homme et le Temps (CET) (L'Homme et le Temps Study Centre) ==
The Centre d'études L'Homme et le Temps holds a library of historical and contemporary works related to time, its measurement, and horology, as well as industrial and private archives, iconographic documents, press files from watchmaking companies, and specialist journals. The museum’s archival holdings are accessible to the public upon request, and the centre also organises colloquia and conferences open to a broad audience.

The museum regularly publishes exhibition catalogues and other works, including historical and technical studies, conference proceedings, theses, and dissertations related to the theme of time. The CET supports academic research in horology, history of science, and anthropology of time, and hosts researchers, students, and specialists from Switzerland and abroad; its documentary collections form a reference resource devoted to time measurement in its technical, cultural, and social dimensions.

== Prix Gaïa ==
Created in 1993, the Prix Gaïa honours individuals who have contributed to the reputation of watchmaking through history, technique, industry, craftsmanship, research, or entrepreneurship. Often described in the watchmaking milieu as a “Nobel of watchmaking”, it is awarded annually and is structured around three categories corresponding to its founding axes: craftsmanship and creation; history and research; and entrepreneurial spirit.

Applications are submitted each year by 21 to the museum. A jury representing different professional spheres of watchmaking and time measurement meets during the summer, and the award ceremony takes place at the autumn equinox. The complete list of laureates is published and maintained by the museum.

=== Prix Gaïa laureates (since 1993) ===
Year	Craftsmanship–Creation	Entrepreneurial Spirit	History–Research
1993	Jean-Claude Nicolet	André Margot	Henry Louis Belmont
1994	François-Paul Journe	Anton Bally	François Mercier
1995	Michel Parmigiani	Antoine Simonin	Ludwig Oechslin
1996	Vincent Calabrese	Günter Blümlein	Jean-Luc Mayaud
1997	Richard Daners	Jean-Pierre Musy	Jean-Claude Sabrier
1998	Philippe Dufour	Luigi Macaluso	Yves Droz and Joseph Flores
1999	Derek Pratt	Gabriel Feuvrier	Estelle Fallet
2000	René Bannwart	Simone Bédat	Kathleen Pritschard
2001	George Daniels	Rolf Schnyder	Catherine Cardinal
2003	Anthony G. Randall		
2004	André Beyner		
2006	Luigi Pippa		John H. Leopold
2007	Paul Gerber		
2008		Nicolas Hayek	
2009	Beat Haldimann	Robert Greubel and Stephen Forsey	
2010	Elmar Mock and Jacques Muller	Jean-Claude Biver	
2011	François Junod	Philippe Stern	Pierre-Yves Donzé
2012	Eric Coudray	Franco Cologni	Francesco Garufo
2013	Andreas Strehler	Ernst Thomke	Günther Oestmann
2014	Kari Voutilainen	Henri Dubois	Pierre Thomann
2015	Anita Porchet	Giulio Papi	Jonathan Betts
2016	Vianney Halter	Giovanni Busca and Pascal Rochat	Roger Smith
2017	Jean-Marc Wiederrecht	Richard Mille	Laurence Marti
2018	Paul Clémenti	Maximilian Büsser	Reinhard Meis
2019	Suzanne Rohr	Karl-Friedrich Scheufele	Laurent Tissot
2020	Antoine Preziuso	Felix Baumgartner and Martin Frei	Denis Savoie
2021	Carole Kasapi	Eric Klein	Anthony Turner
2022	Laurent Barotte	Edouard Meylan	Nico de Rooij
2023	Georges Brodbeck	Miguel Garcia	Hans Boeckh
2024	Jean-Pierre Hagmann	Jasmine Audemars	Caroline Rothauge
2025	Roger W. Smith	Jean-Jacques Paolini	Helmut Crott

== Horizon Gaïa ==
Horizon Gaïa is a support grant awarded annually to encourage emerging profiles in the Prix Gaïa fields: craftsmanship/creation, history/research, and entrepreneurial spirit. The grant generally supports an individual project carried out over at most one year; the application deadline is the same as for the Prix Gaïa, i.e. 21 each year. The grant aims to foster new approaches and projects related to time measurement by providing financial and institutional support.

== MIH Watch ==
The MIH Watch is a Swiss timepiece created in 2005 as an official watch associated with the Musée International d’Horlogerie in La Chaux-de-Fonds, intended to help fund restoration and preservation projects connected with the museum’s horological heritage.

The concept originated under Ludwig Oechslin, then curator of the museum, who conceived an innovative annual calendar watch designed to be technically interesting and accessible. Independent watchmaker Paul Gerber contributed to adapting and industrialising the movement, while Christian Gafner designed the external appearance of the model. The Swiss retailer EMBASSY handled commercialisation and distribution.

The original model is often described as a minimalist mechanical approach, combining a modified single-pusher chronograph movement with an annual calendar using a limited number of additional components compared with the base Valjoux 7750 architecture. A portion of proceeds was allocated to the restoration of major objects in the museum’s collection, including the monumental astronomical clock by the mechanic Daniel Vachey.

In 2019 the museum launched a new edition named “MIH Gaïa – Série I”, continuing the aim of supporting the institution’s missions and celebrating its identity. Série I was limited to 200 pieces and used a Sellita SW400-1 automatic movement, a 39 mm stainless-steel case, and a rotor engraved with the museum’s name; it featured a strap and buckle engraved with the museum’s geographic coordinates.

In September 2019, the International Museum of Horology received the international award "Leonardo The Immortal Light", promoted by the International Committee Leonardo da Vinci. The recognition was presented on 17 September 2019 during the Festival d’Europa held in Talamona, in the province of Sondrio (Italy).

In 2021 the museum presented “MIH Gaïa – Série II”, retaining the technical characteristics of Série I while introducing a black dial.

In 2024 two further editions were unveiled: “MIH Gaïa – Série III”, featuring a blue dial, and a special 50th-anniversary edition limited to 50 pieces. The anniversary edition is distinguished by a hand-guilloché silver dial by Georges Brodbeck, a Prix Gaïa laureate, with each piece presenting unique decoration.

== Programming and cultural mediation ==
Each year the museum presents two temporary exhibitions: a major thematic exhibition focusing on social, economic, and cultural aspects of watchmaking and time measurement, and another devoted to recent acquisitions. On the first Wednesday of each month (except January and August), during the midday break, a guide or curator presents a specific aspect of the collection.

On the first Sunday of each month, the amisMIH association offers a free guided tour. The tour is offered free of charge; museum admission is also free from October to March and paid from April to September.

The museum also participates annually in the Nuit et Journée des musées neuchâtelois, with visits and programmes prepared by the museum team. Each November, watch dealers, antiquarians, and collectors meet at the museum for the Bourse suisse d'horlogerie, where watches, clocks, tools, books, and related objects are offered for sale.

Workshops for young audiences (ages 4 to 12) are organised throughout the year on request, covering themes such as the clepsydra, sundial, Volta pile, enamelling, and the assembly and disassembly of watches.

== amisMIH ==
amisMIH brings together individuals and companies wishing to contribute to the influence of the Musée International d’Horlogerie and to the growth of its collections. Actions are carried out in coordination with the museum’s management.

Created on 31, the day the carillon was inaugurated in the museum park, the association has contributed to enriching the collections. It also organises convivial events for members, such as “À pas contés” walks in August, and publishes Le Carillon, which reports on activities and highlights and is distributed to members as a link between the institution and the association.

== See also ==
- List of museums in Switzerland
