= Ludwig Oechslin =

Swiss watchmaker, designer and inventor (born 1952)

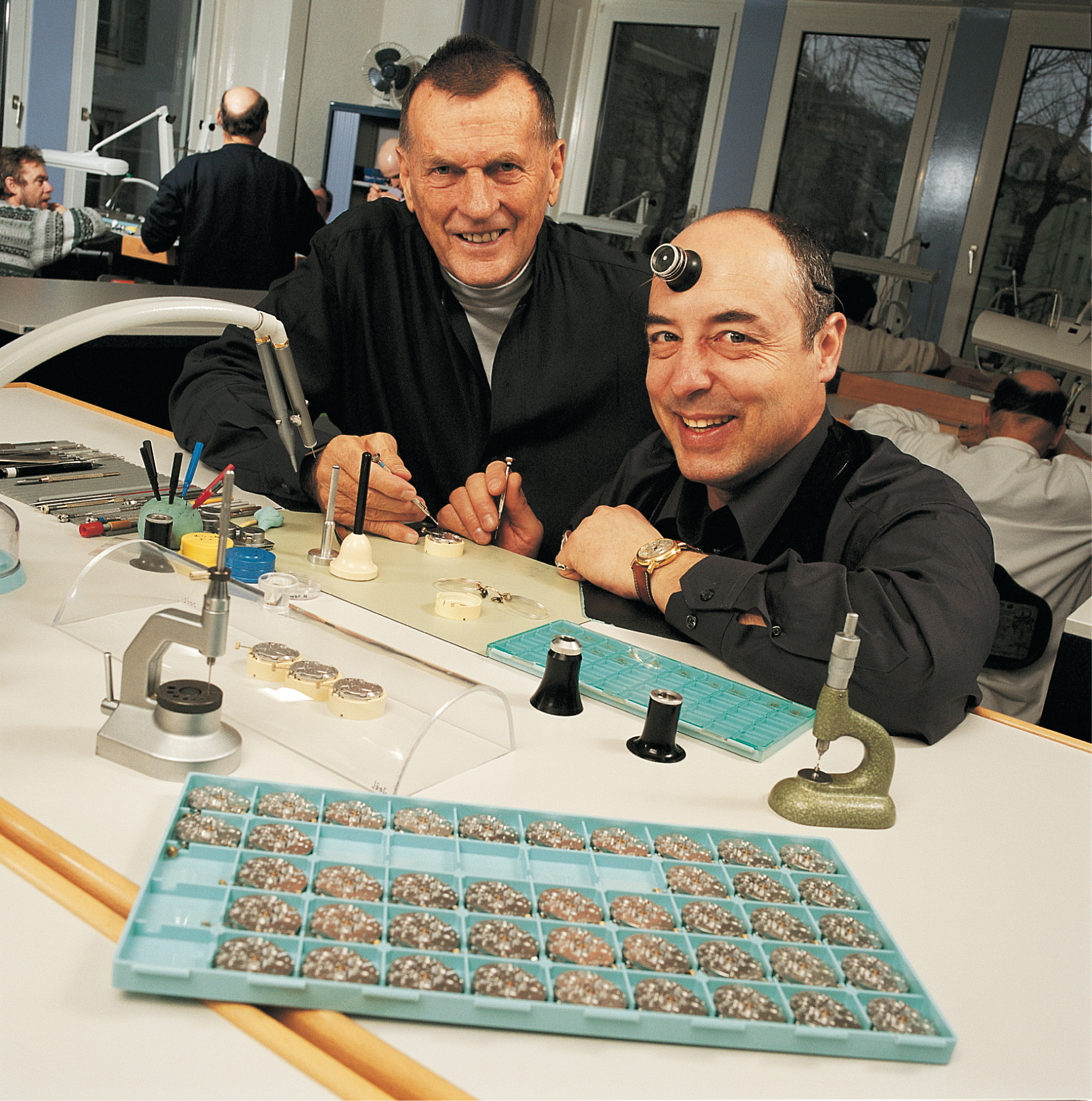
- Ludwig Oechslin (right) pictured with Rolf W. Schnyder (Ulysse Nardin)
- Born: 10 February 1952 (age 74); Gabicce Mare, Italy
- Education: PhD in Philosophy from the University of Bern
- Occupations: Watchmaker, designer, inventor

Ludwig Oechslin (born February 10, 1952) is a Swiss watchmaker, designer and inventor.

== Life ==
Ludwig Oechslin was born in Gabicce Mare. In 1972, he embarked upon a degree course in archaeology at the University of Basel, Switzerland, going on to graduate in 1976. In 1983, was awarded a PhD in Philosophy, specialising on the history of Research, and received a scholarship to study theoretical physics and astronomy at the University of Bern, Switzerland. Parallel to these studies, he also studied to become a watchmaker and was awarded a diploma as a Swiss master watchmaker in 1993. In 1995, Oechslin habilitatiated in Pre-Industrial Technical Archaeology at the Swiss Federal Institute of Technology Zurich (ETHZ), Switzerland.

Oechslin is married with three children.

== Work ==
Ludwig Oechslin got widely known for this restoration of the astronomical clock in the Vatican Library, known as the Farnese Clock, and for the time he spent as Director of the International Museum of Horology in La Chaux-de-Fonds, Switzerland (2011-2014). During this period, he managed the project leading to the release of the MIH watch by the International Museum of Horology.

Oechslin also constructed a replica of the Antikythera Mechanism and developed the extremely complicated astronomical Türler Clock, which was built between 1986 and 1995 by Jörg Spöring for Türler Uhren & Juwelen jewelers in Zurich, Switzerland. Since 2018, the Türler Clock has been on display at the International Museum of Horology.

In the early 1980s, Oechslin started to work for Ulysse Nardin, where he developed numerous watches, including the Freak model, which went on to gain international acclaim.

He also designed the Astrolabium Galileo Galilei wristwatch, mentioned in 1989 in the Guinness Book of World Records as the most complex watch ever made. In 2006, Oechslin founded his own watch company Ochs und junior in Lucerne, Switzerland, together with his partner Beat Weinman. Oechslin currently collaborates with a number of universities such as ETH Zürich and the Université de Neuchâtel, and is a member of the jury of multiple organizations.

== Awards ==
2023: Ludwig Oechslin's «Freak» was awarded the «Iconic Watch Price» of the GPHG

2016: Hommage à la Passion of the Swiss Foundation High Horology

2009: Special Jury Prize at the Grand Prix d'Horlogerie de Genève

1995: Prix Gaïa (histoire-recherches) of the International Museum of Horology

1989: At the end of the 1980s Ludwig Oechslin developed the «Astrolabium Galileo Galilei» for Ulysse Nardin gaining the company an entry into the Guinness Book of Records 1988/89.
