= Ochs und junior =

Watch manufacturer

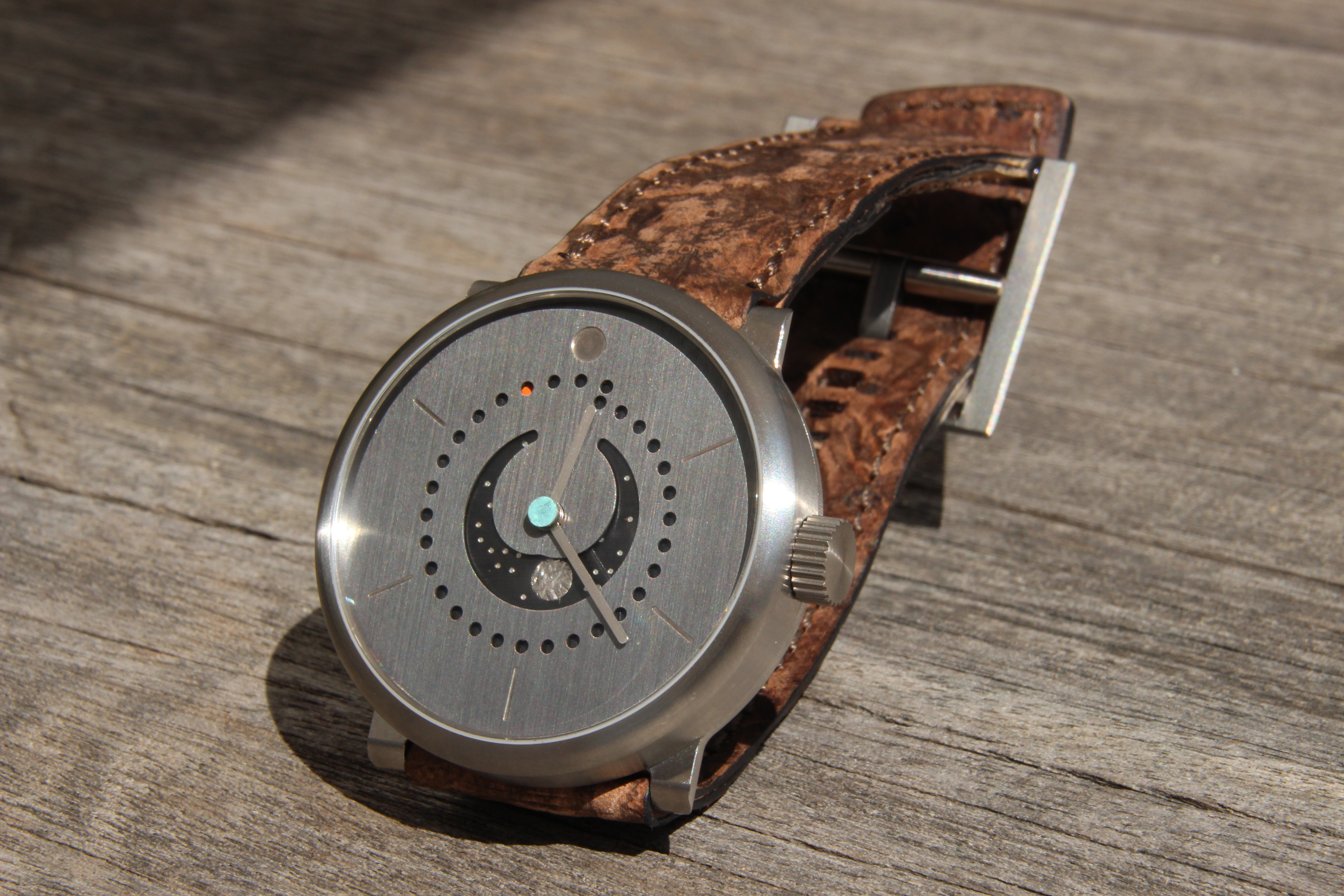

Ochs und junior AG is a Swiss watch manufacturer based in La Chaux-de-Fonds, Switzerland, which is specialised on producing mechanical wristwatches. The company was founded in 2006 by Ludwig Oechslin, a universal scholar and master watchmaker and Kurt König, managing director of Embassy and Beat Weinmann. The Ulysse Nardin watch company became a shareholder of Ochs und junior AG in 2012; today ochs und junior is a pure family business.

== Collection ==
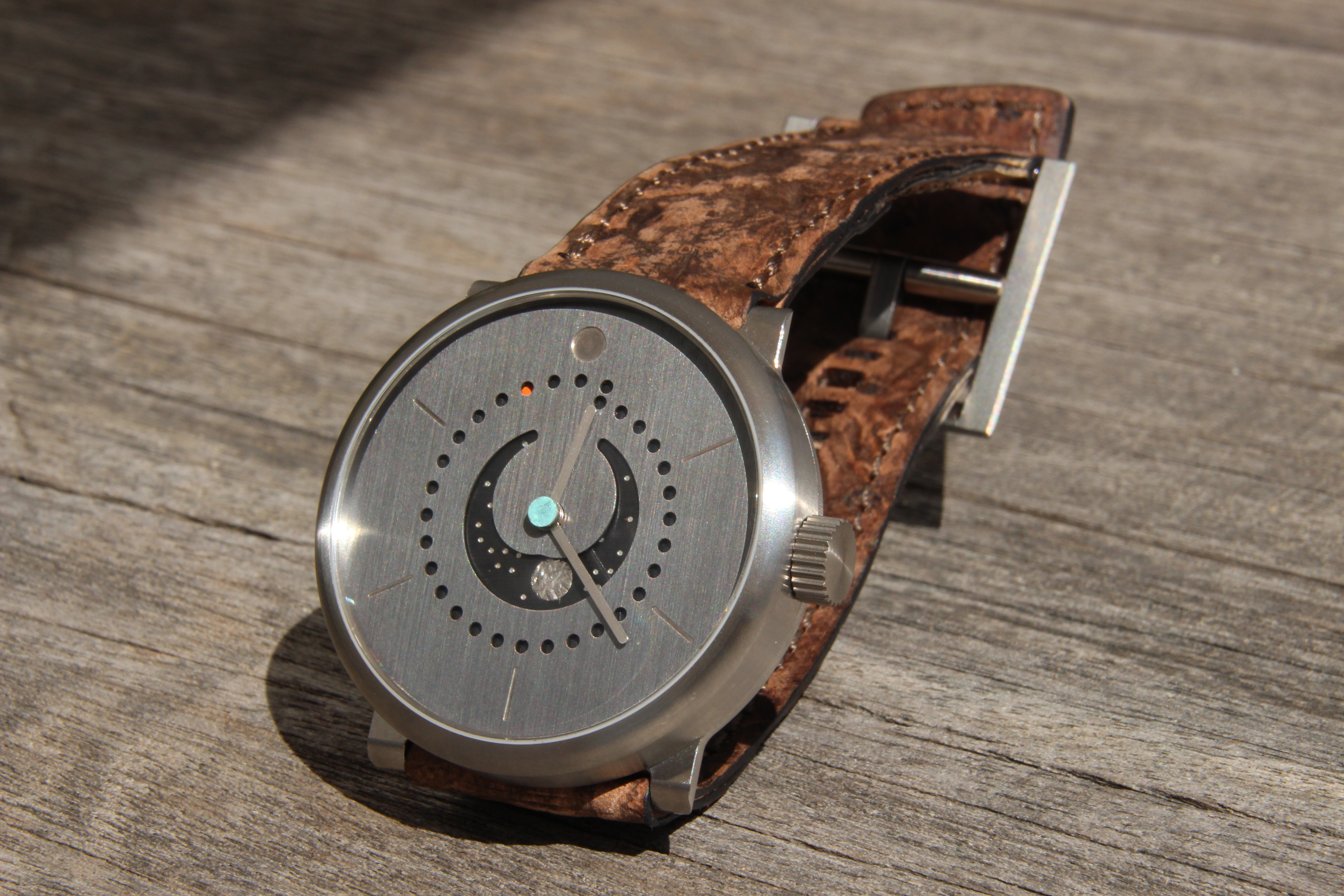
Moon phase watch from Ochs und junior AG with a sturgeon leather strap

The focus of the collection is on astronomical complications (i.e. moon and sun displays) and calendar displays, including perpetual and annual calendars. In contrast to the classic watch industry, the main emphasis is not on creating complicated solutions, but rather on keeping the solutions as simple as possible.

As an example, Ochs und junior AG's moon phase display is accurate to 3478.27 years (after that the display will theoretically deviate from reality by one day) – making it one of the most accurate moon phase displays in the world. This is achieved using an epicyclic gear train consisting of only five components, including the dial.

Build on basic movements bought in from Swiss watch companies ETA or Ulysse Nardin, the final products are created by adding specially developed modules. All other components, such as casings and straps, are also designed in-house.

At the end of 2020, ochs und junior introduced qualified design models for the first time, which cannot be configured and are thus offered at a lower price, including a perpetual calendar.

Although Ochs und junior AG handle the research, development and construction design themselves, the individual components used (gearwheels, case, crown, straps, dial, etc.) are manufactured by highly specialized external subcontractors – with full transparency.

The watches are assembled by Ochs und junior AG's own watchmakers in their workshop in La Chaux-de-Fonds, which also serves as a salesroom.

== Design ==
The watches are designed strictly according to their function. For example, the dials themselves form an integral part of the movement construction. Due to this design philosophy and the high-precision manufacturing process involved, no further finishing, such as polishing the casing, is carried out.

Each watch can be individually designed by the customer via a configurator on the company's website. – making every watch unique.

In general, neither special lettering nor the company logo are used. The only exception is the embossing of the logo on the inside of the leather straps.

== Company size and sales channels ==
With currently sales of approximately 130 watches per year (as of December 2018), Ochs und junior AG is a niche manufacturer. The products are sold exclusively through the company's headquarters in La Chaux-de-Fonds – both on site or via the Internet.

Beat Weinmann, CEO and co-founder for many years, who represented the interface between production, planning, communication, sales and service, left the company at the end of November 2019.

In March 2020, the company moved its headquarters from Lucerne to La Chaux-de-Fonds and appointed Marc Bernhardt as the new managing director on an interim basis. Since the end of 2020, ochs und junior has once again been purely owned by Dr Ludwig Oechslin and Prof Kornelia Imesch and is run as a family business.

== Pricing ==
Depending on the model and configuration concerned, sales prices range between approx. CHF 6,000 and CHF 21,600 – and can be even higher, if special requests are accommodated. This puts Ochs und Junior AG watches in the upper price range of the luxury watch market segment.
