= Rolf W. Schnyder =

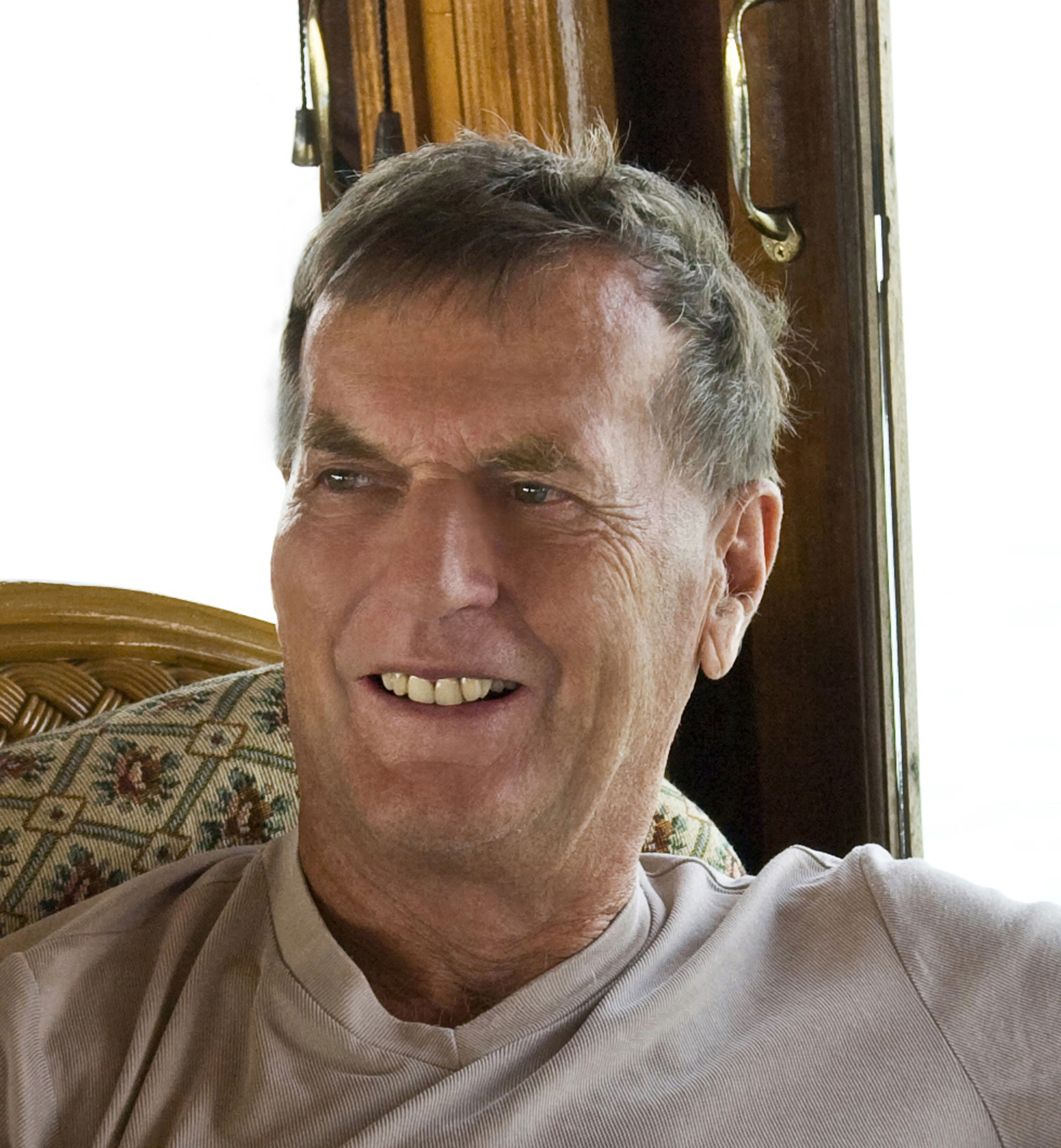
- Born: 31 July 1935; Zürich, Switzerland
- Died: 14 April 2011 (aged 75); Kuala Lumpur, Malaysia
- Occupation: Businessman
- Title: Ulysse Nardin, Owner / CEO

Rolf W. Schnyder (31 July 1935 in Zurich – 14 April 2011 in Kuala Lumpur) was a Swiss businessman known for his role as the owner and CEO of watchmaker Ulysse Nardin.

== Early life ==
Born in Zurich, in the German-language-speaking part of Switzerland, in 1956, Schnyder moved to Geneva to improve his French, and worked in Jaeger-LeCoultre's advertising department on Geneva's Tour de L'Ile. Schnyder was later posted for six months to London.

Schnyder had an interest in traveling. In 1958, he saw a newspaper clipping about a Swiss company named Diethelm that was distributing goods in Thailand, including watches, and they were searching for a Swiss junior manager. Schnyder responded to the ad and his application was accepted.

== Manufacturing career ==
Schnyder travelled extensively throughout Asia as part of his work there in the late 1950s and 1960s, including in a rafting expedition down the river Kwai that was covered in the Swiss press. Schnyder also visited China during the cultural revolution; journalists' photos taken during this trip were later published in publications including the US magazine, “Life”.

In 1968, Schnyder opened the Cosmo watch-component factory in Thailand, selling these components to the Swiss watch industry. In 1973, he sold his shares in Cosmo and established another watch-component manufacturing company called Precima, this time based in Kuala Lumpur. Schnyder later settled in Malaysia and had a house built there in traditional Malay style by the architect Jimmy Lim. The house was named Precima House.

== Purchase of Ulysse Nardin ==
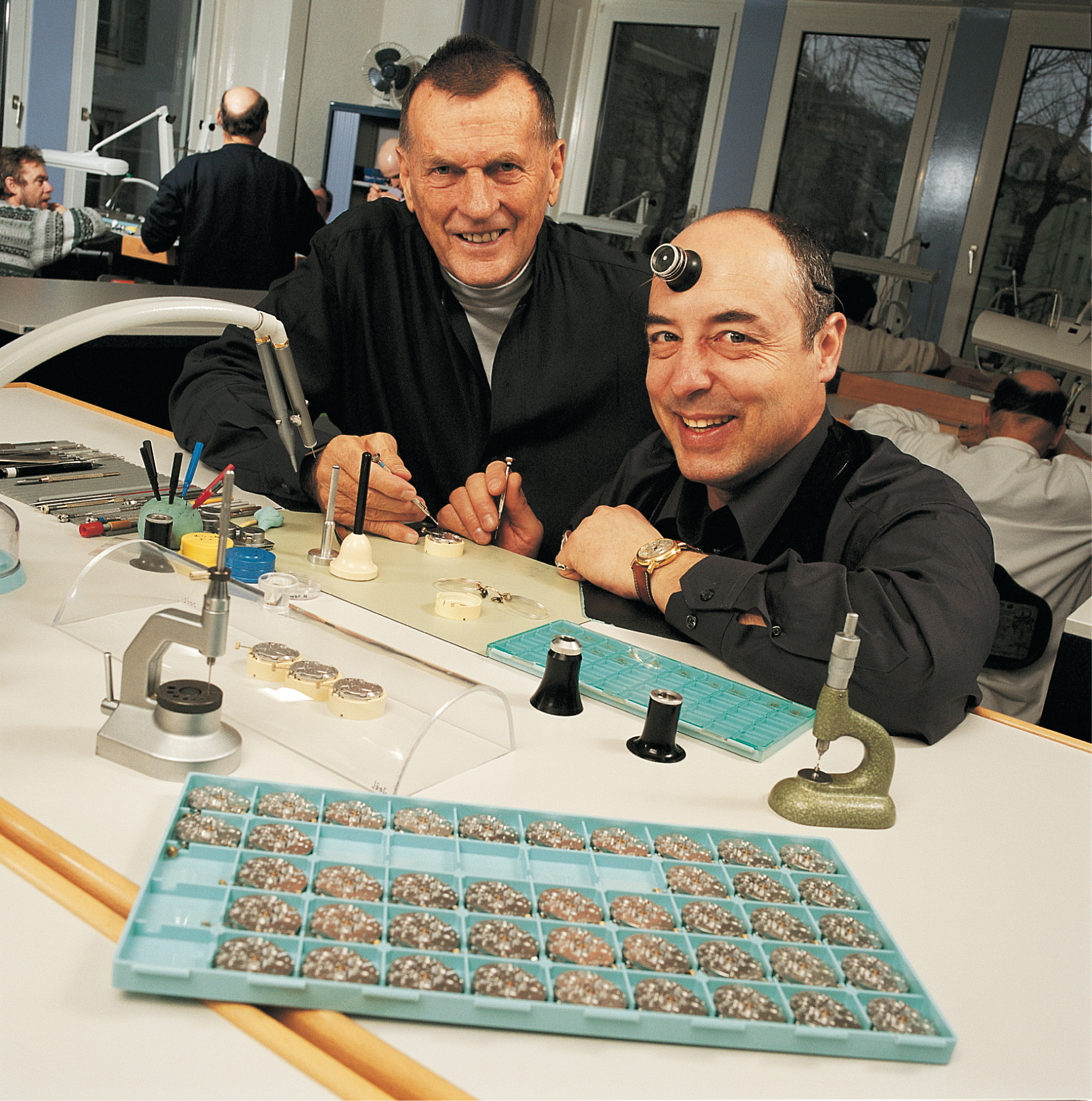
Rolf W. Schnyder and Ludwig Oechslin working together.

In 1983, at 48 years of age, Schnyder returned to St. Moritz, Switzerland to ski and race skeleton bobsleds. During this time, Schnyder saw a news report that the Swiss marine instrument manufacturer Ulysse Nardin was for sale. Schnyder purchased the firm with the idea that it could launch a range of high-end mechanical watches based on a miniaturised version of the marine instruments sold by the company. In order to achieve this miniaturisation, Schnyder hired the engineer Ludwig Oechslin, with the resulting watch, the Astrolabium, being launched in 1985. Oeschlin went on to design a number of successful watches for Ulysse Nardin.

After the fall of the USSR, Schnyder identified the former USSR as an important market for expansion of sales. One of their watches was prominently worn by a central Asian leader. To exploit this success, Ulysse Nardin released a watch that Schnyder called the Genghis Khan. In 2001, Schnyder's Freak watch was released, which was notable for telling the time using the revolutions of a tourbillon cage (a kind of bridge), including components made of Silicium (a silicon-based metalloid), and having a lubricant-free design.

In 2006, the Swiss business magazine Bilanz listed Schnyder as one of the top 100 figures of the watch industry. By 2007, the company, which Schnyder owned an 80% stake in at that point, had an annual turnover of roughly 180 million Swiss Francs. In 2010, Bilanz listed Schnyder as one of the Switzerland's 300 richest people, with a net worth of 250 million Swiss Francs.

== Personal life ==
Schnyder often shuttled between Switzerland and Malaysia. Schnyder shared a tropical home with his wife, with whom he had three children.

In recognition of his contributions to watchmaking, Schnyder was awarded the "Spirit of Enterprise" Gaia Award in 2003 by the Musee International d'Horlogerie for his entrepreneurial achievements and commitments. This award was followed by the bestowment of the "Lifetime Achievement Award" by the Grand Prix d'Horlogerie de Geneve: Asian Edition in Singapore for his continued contributions towards watch making technology and innovations.

On April 14, 2011, Schnyder died at the age of 75 after a short illness. The cause of death was acute pancreatitis. His wife attended the CHT Awards and Ball 2011 to accept the Pursuit of Excellence (Expat) Award on his behalf.
