= Luigi Macaluso =

Racecar driver

- Born: 9 June 1948; Turin, Italy
- Died: 27 October 2010 (aged 62)
- Occupations: Entrepreneur, businessman

Luigi Macaluso, also known as Gino (Turin, 9 June 1948 – La Chaux-de-Fonds, 27 October 2010) was an Italian rally navigator and manager. Together with Raffaele Pinto, he won the European Rally Championship in 1972 and the Italian Rally Championship with Maurizio Verini in 1974. He was then the chairman and CEO of the Sowind group, under whose roof Girard-Perregaux, the watchmaker GP Manufacture and JeanRichard were united.

Under his leadership, the Sowind group relaunched the historic watchmaking house with big investments in technology and design. In particular, the historic Manufacture of La Chaux-de-Fonds, one of the last in the world, today boasts 110 haute horlogerie movements and 80 patents.

== Career ==
Graduated in architecture at the University of Turin in 1975, Gino Macaluso began his long career in the world of watchmaking in Italy, joining the Italian distributor company of SSIH, now the Swatch Group. In 1982, in Turin, he founded Tradema, one of the largest watch distribution companies in Italy which includes the Blancpain, Breitling and Hamilton brands. In 1987 he became the official agent of Girard-Perregaux for the Italian market and, in 1989, he joined the Manufacturing board of directors. On 15 September 1992, he assumed the presidency of the Sowind Group. He personally designed, in collaboration with the internal Design Center, the models for the new collections, enhancing the Italian style in the world. The only Italian entrepreneur to be considered among the most authoritative in the international watch and luxury watch market, in 1998 he received the Gaïa Prize for the Esprit d'Entreprise, the most prestigious recognition in the Swiss watch world, awarded since 1993 by the Musée International d'Horlogerie to those personalities who made watchmaking and its art known through their activities.

In spring 2009, after the strategic agreement with the Kering Group, which belongs to the French businessman Francois-Henri Pinault, he joined the Gucci Group Management Committee with responsibility for the watch and jewelry sector and the Conseil de Surveillance of Boucheron, one of the greatest jewelers in the world.

He was nominated three times – in 1999, 2001 and 2004 – president of the Association Interprofessionelle de la Haute Horologerie (AIHH). He was vice-president of the Italian-Swiss Chamber of Commerce in Zurich and advisor in the Chamber of Commerce of Neuchâtel.

He was one of the three founding members of the Haute Horlogerie Foundation and of the Salon International de la Haute Horlogerie in Geneva, where in 2008 he presented a preview of the "Constant Escapement", a new constant-force escapement, revolutionary for the technology, the design and the materials used (silicon). Promoter of training initiatives with Swiss universities, he has engaged with the Canton of Neuchâtel in a project for the establishment of new university and post-university courses for haute horlogerie.

== Passion for motorsport ==
Official navigator of the Fiat rally team, in 1972 he won the European rally championship and the Mitropa Cup paired with Emanuele Pinto on the Fiat 124 Spider and in 1974 the Italian Rally Championship together with Maurizio Verini on the Fiat 124 Abarth.

In 1987 he joined Club Italia, a non-profit cultural sports association, established to enhance the historical heritage of the Italian classic car, of which he has been president for almost two decades. In 1997 he joined the ACI-CSAI (Automobile Club of Italy-Italian Automobile Sports Commission); in 2001 he was elected president: he will be honorary president until his death.

While he was dedicating himself to promoting the cultural, social, aesthetic and historical values of the automobile, he decided to restore rally cars dating back to the golden age of the specialty: from here began a collection that is still today one among the most relevant in this sector.

In 2000 he founded a team that aimed to compete in the Junior World Championship with Italian colors: the R&D Motorsport, which brought Andrea Dallavilla driving a Fiat Punto Rally Super 1600 to win the title of second world champion in the season 2001 of the JWRC.

In 2005, Gino Macaluso was elected President of the International Karting Commission, organ of the International Automobile Federation (FIA), and became the representative of Italy on the World Council of the same.

== Fondazione Gino Macaluso per l'Auto Storica ==
In 2018, Gino Macaluso's family established a foundation that bears his name. Its purpose is to make Gino's dream come true: he considered the car "the most intense expression of creativity of the twentieth century".

For this purpose and thanks to the collection that belonged to Gino, the foundation organizes, promotes and participates in events, competitions, rallies, exhibitions, fairs, seminars, conferences, workshops related to historic cars, motorsport and its protagonists.

At the same time, it promotes studies, restorations and publications about historic cars.

== Distinctions ==
In 2008, Gino Macaluso was appointed a Grand Officer of the Order of Merit of the Italian Republic. In 2009, he was appointed a Knight of the Order of Merit for Labour.

== See also ==
- Girard-Perregaux
