= Constant Girard =

Swiss watchmaker (1825-1903)

Constant Girard (La Chaux-de-Fonds, 1825 – La Chaux-de-Fonds, 1903) was a Swiss watchmaker from the 19th century, who marked his time by his developments in the escapement systems, in particular that of the tourbillon. His most famous watch, the Tourbillon with three gold bridges, is still fabricated today in modern versions by the Swiss watch manufacturer, Girard-Perregaux.

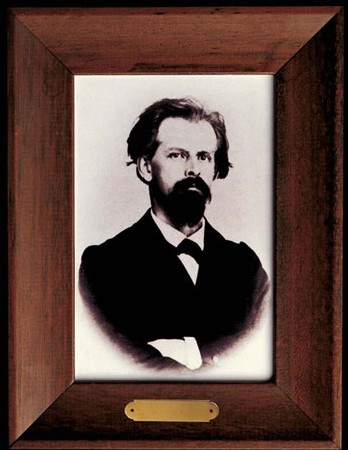
Constant Girard

== Life ==
Girard began his career apprenticed to the watchmaker of La Sagne, in the mountains of Neuchâtel, Switzerland. In 1845, he joined forces with watchmaker C. Robert. Around 1852, he practiced his profession under the name of “Girard & Cie,” at the side of his older brother Numa.

In 1854, he married Marie Perregaux (1831–1912), who came from a family of watchmakers, and the two founded in 1856 the watch manufacturing company in La Chaux-de-Fonds that still carries their combined family names: Girard-Perregaux, which is still in existence today. His business developed rapidly, all the way to America and Japan.

Girard was equally active in the social, political, and economic life of La Chaux-de-Fonds.

He died in 1903.

== Tourbillon ==
Girard devoted many long years to studying and designing diverse systems of escapements, particularly the tourbillon. Invented at the very beginning of the 19th century, the tourbillon counteracted the differing effects of gravity on a watch held in the vertical versus horizontal position, thanks to a mobile cage that carries the settling organ.

He redesigned the three bridges, part of the watch movement, into the form of arrows parallel to one another. With a patented design in 1884, his tourbillon with three gold bridges was awarded a gold medal at the Universal Exposition of Paris in 1889.

== Other accomplishments ==
Girard was equally interested in the measure of time, and he illustrated this in his chronometer watches. Girard-Perregaux were rewarded by several gold medals or diplomas from expositions in Europe and in America for his efforts. Some of its creations are presented at the Girard-Perregaux Museum situated in La Chaux-de-Fonds, Switzerland.

He also produced the first ever major commercial production of a wristwatch, made for German naval officers and ordered by German Kaiser Wilhelm I for his German naval officers. Two thousand such watches were ordered and produced, which represents the first important commercialization of wristwatches.

== Sources ==
- François Chaille, Girard-Perregaux, Editions Flammarion, 2004, ISBN 2-08-011069-1
