= Jean-François Bautte =

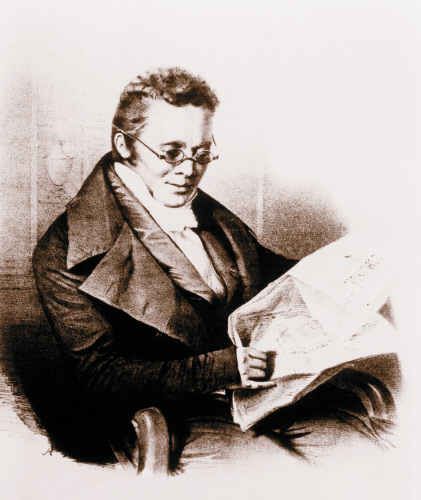
Jean-François Bautte (1772-1837)

Jean-François Bautte (26 March 1772 in Geneva – 30 November 1837 in Geneva) was a Swiss watchmaker and jeweller famous for several reasons: he founded the most complete watch manufacture of his time in Geneva. He also created watches and jewellery for famous people and was one of the inventors of the extra-thin watch.

== Life ==
Jean-François Bautte came from a family of modest workmen. Very soon an orphan, he was placed in an apprenticeship at the age of 12, i.e. in 1784, and was trained in the different trades of being a case fitter, engraver, watchmaker, jeweller, and goldsmith. He signed his first creations in 1791. On August 1, 1793, he joined forces with Jacques-Dauphin Moulinié, under the corporate name Moulinié & Bautte, case fitters. On October 1, 1804, with the arrival of Jean-Gabriel Moynier, the firm became Moulinié, Bautte & Cie, seller of watch making-jewellery making. It was then that Jean-François Bautte developed his own manufacture in Geneva that brought together under the same roof all the bodies of trades of watch making from that time. He died on November 30, 1837, and was buried in Plainpalais Cemetery in Geneva.

== Creations ==
The workshops of Jean-François Bautte were grouped around the sales shop situated on Rue du Rhône. With his workmen, he produced watches, jewellery, music boxes…he excelled in the “watches of shape:” watches disguised in miniature musical instruments, in butterflies or in flowers, and even a watch in the form of a perfume-dispensing gun. He was also one of the first fabricators of extra-thin watches, of which he made one of his specialties. In addition to his store in Geneva, he had branches in Paris and Florence. He also traded equally with Turkey, India, and China.

Recognized by his high quality creations, his popularity exceeded the borders of Switzerland. The name of Bautte appeared in the writings of Alexandre Dumas, père, the writings of Balzac in his “Letters to the Stranger,” and in the writings of John Ruskin. Among some of his clients included Queen Victoria, the duchess of Clermont-Tonnerre.

== Succession ==
On December 20, 1837, the Jean-François Bautte & Cie Company was formed, seller of watch and jewellery making, by his son Jacques Bautte and his son-in-law Jean-Samuel Rossel. The company was then repurchased by Constant Girard-Gallet, owner of the Swiss watch Manufacturer Girard-Perregaux (La Chaux-de-Fonds) in 1906. Some of his creations are on display at the Patek Philippe Museum in Geneva and at the Girard-Perregaux Museum in La Chaux-de-Fonds.

=== See also ===
- Girard-Perregaux

=== References ===
- François Chaille, Girard-Perregaux, Editions Flammarion, 2004, ISBN 2-08-011069-1
- Joseph Rambal, L’Horlogerie à Genève, In Nos Anciens et leurs Oeuvres, Recueil genevois d’Art, Genève, 1905
- Eugène Jaquet, Le Cabinotier Jean-François Bautte, rénovateur de la « Fabrique » genevoise, In Revue internationale d’horlogerie, 51, 1950, 7
- Eugène Jaquet, Alfred Chapuis, Histoire et technique de la montre suisse de ses origines à nos jours, Urs Graf, Bâle et Olten, 1945
