= Anita Porchet =

Swiss watch enameller

- Born: January 15, 1961 (age 65); La Chaux-de-Fonds, Switzerland
- Education: École des Beaux-Arts; École cantonale d'art de Lausanne
- Occupation: Watch enameller

Anita Porchet is a Swiss watch enameller who works as an independent artist in the Swiss watchmaking industry. She is considered an expert enameller and a master of the craft.

== Biography ==
Porchet was born on January 15, 1961, in La Chaux-de-Fonds, Switzerland. She first learned the techniques of enamelling from her godfather, himself a watch engraver. She studied at both the École des Beaux-Arts and the École cantonale d'art de Lausanne. She earned her engraving and enamelling certificate in 1984. Porchet apprenticed under Suzanne Rohr.

From 1985 to 1992, Porchet taught crafting and enamelling at the School of Applied Arts in La Chaux-de-Fonds. In 1993, she opened her own studio in Lausanne where she operated as an independent contractor offering watch enamelling services. She started creating her own custom watch faces in 1994. Her clients include watch companies such as Patek Philippe, Vacheron Constantin, and Piaget SA. Describing her process for Patek Philippe, the company provides the motif allowing her to apply her own artistic interpretation to craft the final product.

Porchet employs three different techniques to create a watch face: cloisonné, enamel painting, and mixing together both transparent and colored enamel. She also practices paillonné enamelling, a technique which applies "microscopic specks of gold leaf to the enamel".

== Awards and honors ==
- In 1984, Porchet won the Patek Philippe Prize
- In 2015, Porchet was honored by the Prix Gaïa in the Artisan-Creation category
- In 2017, Porchet received the special jury prize at Grand Prix d'Horlogerie de Genève alongside her mentor Suzanne Rohr
