= Suzanne Rohr =

Swiss watch enameller

- Born: 1939 (age 86–87); Geneva, Switzerland
- Education: School of Decorative Arts in Geneva
- Occupation: Watch enameller

Suzanne Rohr is a Swiss watch enameller who works as an independent artist in the Swiss watchmaking industry. She is considered an expert miniature enamel painter and has maintained a long-time partnership with Swiss watchmaker Patek Philippe.

== Early life and education ==
Rohr was born in Geneva, Switzerland in 1939. As a child, she was interested in painting and drawing, and drew inspiration from an enamel exhibit at the Art and History Museum in Geneva. She went on to study enamelling at the School of Decorative Arts in Geneva, graduating in 1959 as the only student in the class. The same year she won the Hans Wilsdorf Foundation prize for her enamelling work on a women's bracelet.

== Career ==
Rohr opened her own studio in 1960 and began receiving mentoring from Genevan enameler and miniaturist, Carlo Poluzzi. In 1967, she began an exclusive partnership with Swiss watchmaker Patek Philippe. Rohr continued to produce pieces for Patek Philippe, some taking up to two years to create, for over five decades.

Rohr employs the Geneva Technique, a process that involves layering different colors of enamel and baking at high temperatures, with some pieces requiring up to 25 different layers to complete. She makes uses of rare minerals and uses brushes as thin as a "single boar's hair".

Rohr mentored Anita Porchet who is considered one of the "most in-demand of today’s top enamellers".

== Awards and honors ==
- In 1959, Rohr was awarded the Hans Wilsdorf Foundation prize in recognition of her enamelling work
- In 2017, Rohr received the special jury prize at Grand Prix d'Horlogerie de Genève alongside her protégé Anita Porchet
- In 2019, Rohr was honored by the Prix Gaïa for her "mastery of the art of enamelling"
