= Ulysse Nardin =

Swiss luxury watchmaking company

Coordinates: 47.06007°N 6.75361°E

Ulysse Nardin SA
- Type: Subsidiary
- Industry: Luxury watchmaking
- Founded: 1846; 180 years ago
- Founder: Ulysse Nardin
- Headquarters: Le Locle, Neuchâtel, Switzerland
- Area served: Worldwide
- Key people: Patrick Pruniaux (CEO)
- Products: Wristwatches, Writing Instruments & Accessories
- Parent: Sowind Group
- Website: ulysse-nardin.com

Ulysse Nardin SA is a Swiss luxury watchmaking company founded in 1846 in Le Locle, Switzerland.

The company became known for manufacturing highly accurate marine chronometers and complicated precision exclusive timepieces used by over 50 of the world's navies from the end of the 19th century till 1950. According to the last official report of Neuchâtel Observatory in Switzerland, Ulysse Nardin had won numerous awards and honors for its marine chronometers from 1846 to 1975, including 4324 certificates, 2411 special prizes and 18 gold medals at International exhibitions.

The company was taken over and re-invigorated in 1983 by Rolf W. Schnyder who transformed it into a profitable business. From 2014, it was a subsidiary of the French luxury group Kering. Ulysse Nardin has operated out of the same building headquartered in Le Locle, Switzerland since 1865. Ulysse Nardin is now owned by Sowind Group SA following a management buyout.

The company today designs and manufactures luxury watches, dual-time watches, and marine chronometers, and sells its products through a network of distributors and several boutiques around the world.

== History ==
=== Early history ===
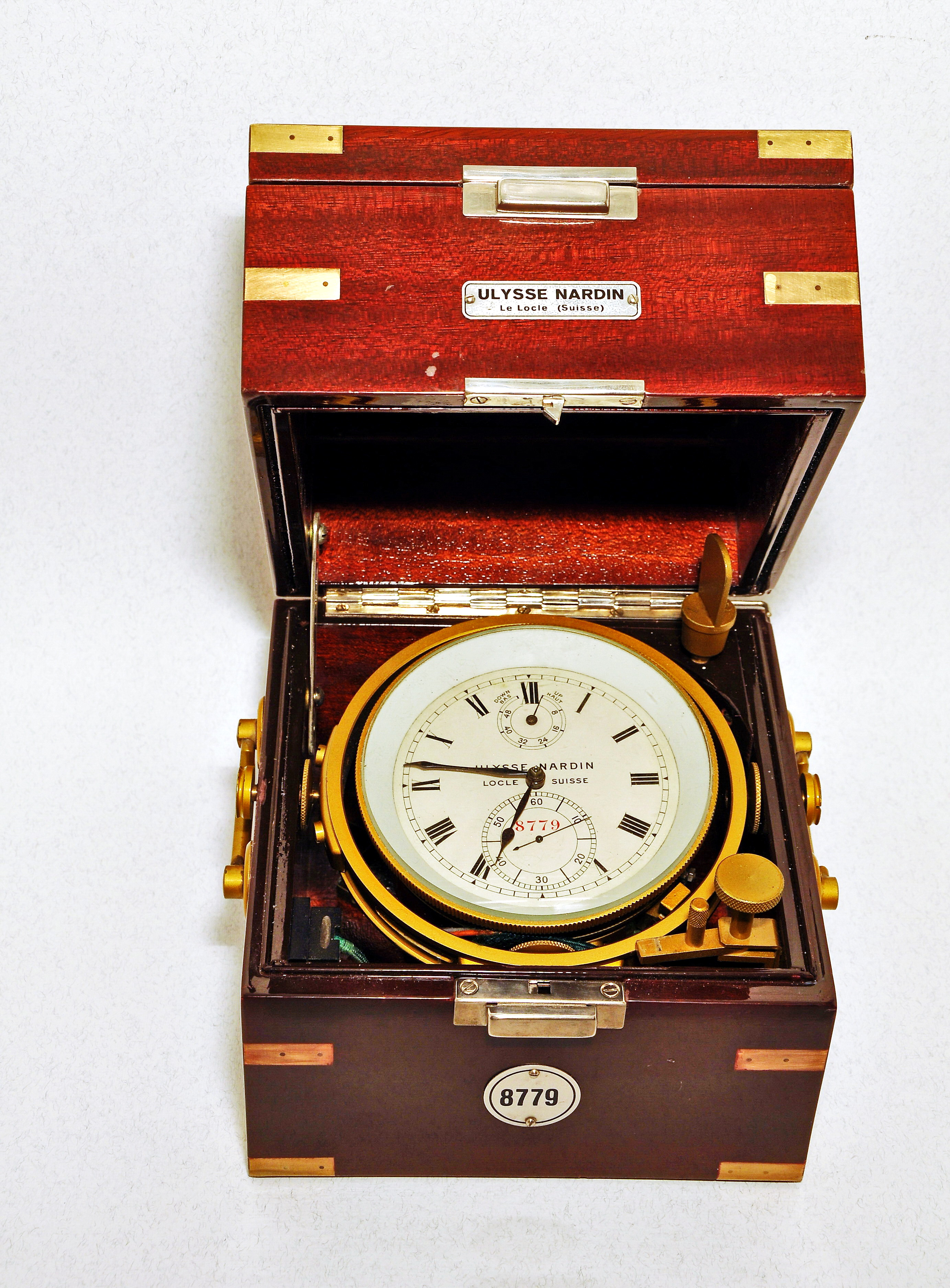
Ulysse Nardin marine chronometer

Ulysse Nardin was born in 1823 in Le Locle, Switzerland. During the long and snowy winters, inhabitants used to produce timekeeping instruments to survive, as they couldn't live from farming alone. Ulysse Nardin first trained as an apprentice horologist under his father, Léonard-Frédéric Nardin, and perfected his skills under the tutelage of Frédéric-William Dubois and Louis JeanRichard-dit-Bressel, two master watchmakers who were experts in precision watches and whose fame extended beyond the mountains of Neuchâtel, Switzerland.

In 1846, at the age of 23, Ulysse Nardin founded his own company in Le Locle where its headquarters are still located. Despite Ulysse Nardin growing up in the Jura mountains, he was fascinated by the sea and produced nautical timekeeping instruments. His company became one of the first to manufacture marine chronometers and high-precision seafaring instruments for commercial ships and navies throughout the world. His pocket and marine chronometers became reference products in civil, military and scientific realms.

Ulysse Nardin acquired a high-precision astronomical regulator, built by Jacques-Frederic Houriet in 1768, to rate his pocket chronometers. It is now in a museum in Le Locle. Minute repeaters, complicated watches and pocket chronometers carried the reputation of the company.

At that time, famous horologists were French and English. Ulysse Nardin went to London to challenge the best pocket chronometers makers. At the 1862 International Exhibition in London, Ulysse Nardin was awarded the Prize Medal in the category of "complicated watches and pocket chronometers". The prize was the highest distinction for watchmaking in the United Kingdom. In 1867, Ulysse Nardin obtained the first series of certificates from Neuchâtel Observatory for its marine chronometers. In 1876, Ulysse Nardin died at age 53, and his son Paul-David Nardin succeeded him as the head of the company which continued to expand. In 1889, Ulysse Nardin won a Gold Medal at the Paris Universal Exhibition, was awarded two Swiss patents in 1890, won First Prize at the Chicago Universal Exhibition in 1893, and many more.

In 1902, the company started to deliver marine chronometers to the United States Navy. The brand regularly won Washington Naval Observatory competitions and became the official supplier for the US Navy's torpedo boats. The company has since provided timepieces to the navies of the United States, United Kingdom, Russia and Japan. Since the 1870s, over 50 navies and international shipping companies had been equipped with Ulysse Nardin marine chronometers.

In 1975, the Neuchâtel Observatory published the last official edition on the performance of chronometers from 1846 to 1975. According to this report, Ulysse Nardin was awarded 4,324 performance certificates for mechanical marine chronometers out of 4,504 submitted (95%).

=== Recent development ===
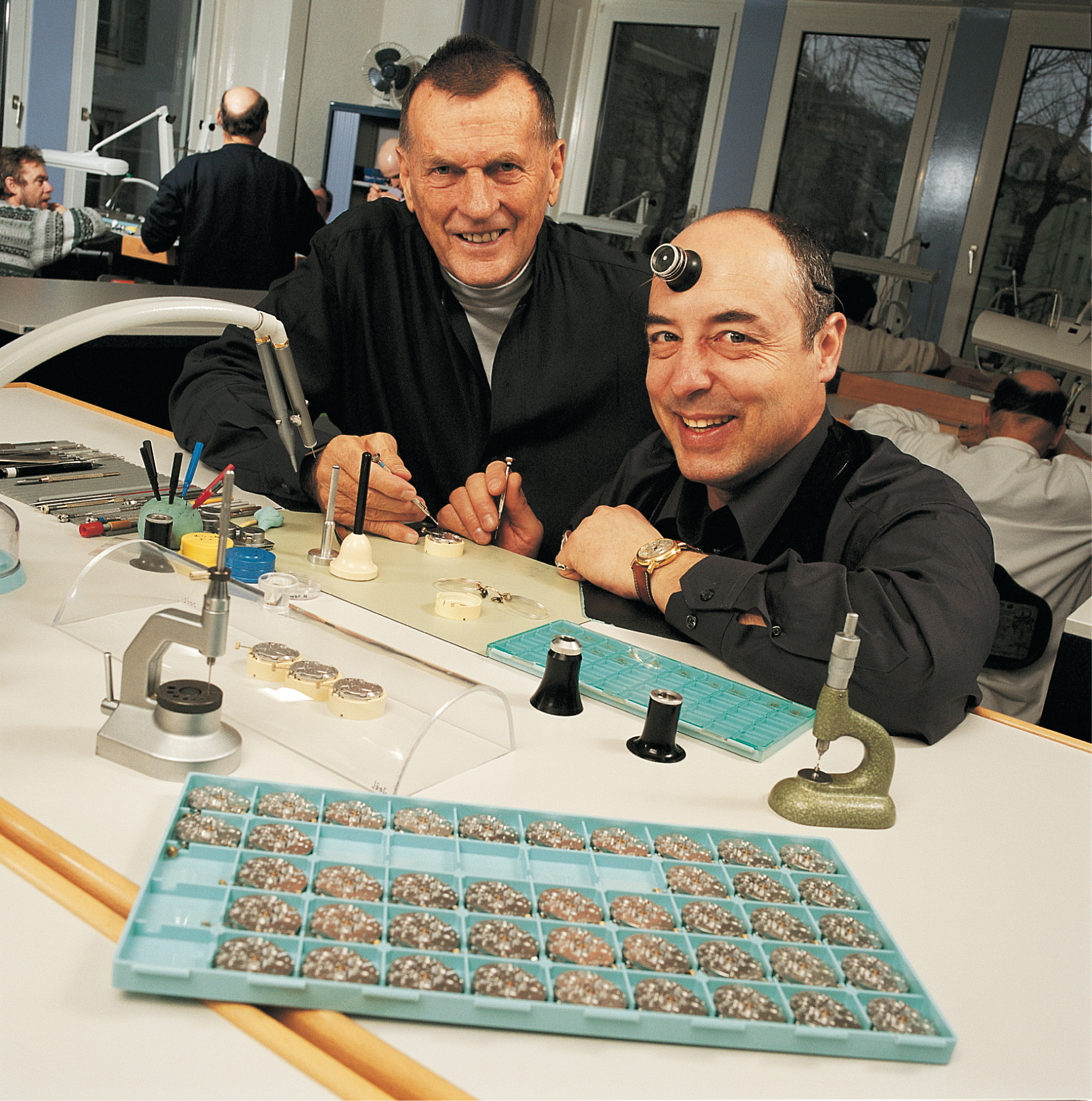
Rolf Schnyder and Ludwig Oechslin

Due to the quartz crisis, Ulysse Nardin faced significant challenges in late 1970s and early 1980s. In 1983, the company was acquired by businessman Rolf Schnyder who, in conjunction with watchmakers such as Ludwig Oechslin, revived the brand. Rolf Schnyder served as its chief executive and transformed the company into a healthy business. Schnyder and Oechslin would aim to produce complication timepieces using modern materials and manufacturing techniques. Ulysse Nardin has introduced several innovations. In 1996, Ulysse Nardin released its first marine chronometer wristwatch "Marine Chronometer 1846", and first perpetual calendar "Perpetual Ludwig". These timepieces were designed by Ludwig Oechslin for the 150th anniversary of the brand.

After Schnyder' sudden death in 2011, Chai Schnyder, his wife, took over the company till it was acquired by the Kering group in 2014.

In 2011, Ulysse Nardin acquired a Swiss enameler workshop, Donzé Cadrans, that has provided the brand the opportunity to use enamel in its watch dials. In 2012, Ulysse Nardin launched its first automatic caliber, entirely conceived and manufactured in-house: UN-118. One year later, Ulysse Nardin released five new in-house calibers (UN-690, UN-310, UN-170, UN-150 and UN-205).

In 2014, Ulysse Nardin was acquired by the French luxury group Kering, which took a 100% stake in the watch brand. In 2017, the company appointed Patrick Pruniaux, a previous executive of Apple, as its new CEO. In 2019, Ulysse Nardin has released three new calibers (UN-230, UN-371 and UN-631).

The company still occupies its original headquarters in Le Locle, one of the main watch production hubs in northwest Switzerland and has three manufacturing plants in: La Chaux-de-Fonds (R&D and movement production site), Le Locle (Donzé Cadrans site, which belongs to Ulysse Nardin but also produces enamel dials for other companies) and Sion (Sigatec site, which produces micromechanics components in silicium).

While marine wrist chronometers are still a specialty for the brand, it also produces luxury complicated timepieces for men and women.

The company sells its products through a network of distributors and several boutiques around the globe, as well as through retailers in Europe, America, Middle East, Asia, Africa, Australia, China and Russia.

Ulysse Nardin is part of the exclusive circle of Swiss watchmaking the Fondation de la Haute Horlogerie.

== Watch manufacturing ==
The company has an integrated production system. The majority of the work is done in-house, from conception, design, development and crafting through to production. The brand produces its own high-precision components, movements and calibers. Since the acquisition of Donzé Cadrans, Ulysse Nardin creates its own enamel dials. Pieces are heated to a high temperature (1500 °F or 850 °C) repeatedly, several times, as layers of color are added. This requires hours of work.

Engineers, drafting technicians, technical and caliber designers develop new technologies, and design movements. They produce prototypes and tools for the workshops. Profile turners or specialist setters supervise the production of pieces required for the balance axis, screws, pins and the other minute parts. Decorators engrave plates and bridges with distinctive patterns. Experienced watchmakers then assemble the finished components, working on the movements of in-house calibers. Another team of watchmakers, specialized in highly complicated timepieces, works on the movement assemblies and casings of complex mechanisms (minute repeater, hourstriker, tourbillon...) and astronomical timepieces. In 2020, the company developed a model made of plastic ocean waste.

Quality control experts perform checks on everything: aesthetics, watch functions, waterproofing, etc. Some watches have a chronometer movement certified for accuracy by the Contrôle Officiel Suisse des Chronomètres, the official Swiss testing agency. Ulysse Nardin has also its own quality certification, the Ulysse Nardin Certificate, with standards for quality higher than the COSC.

== Notable models ==
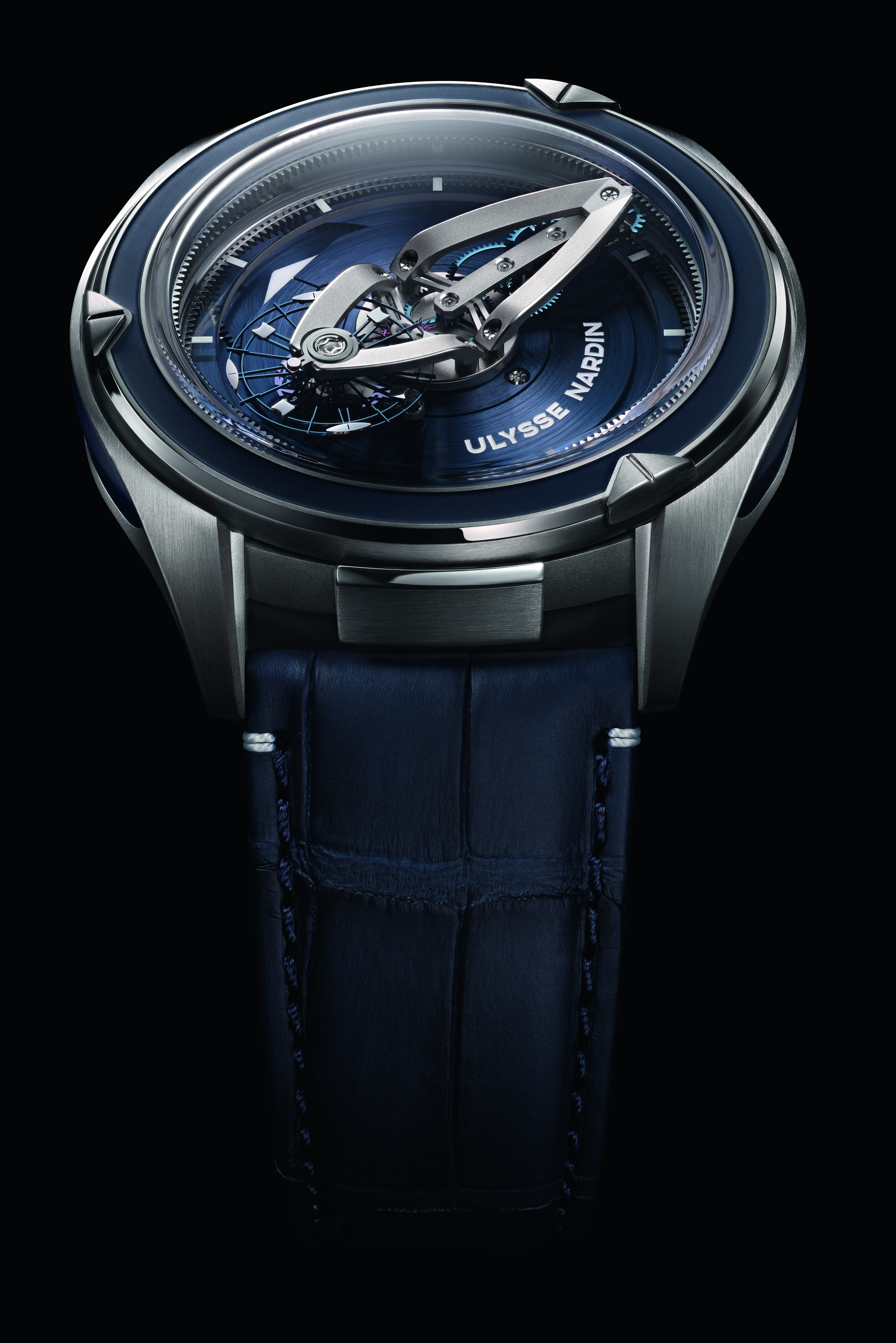
A Freak wristwatch

=== Freak ===
Ulysse Nardin introduced the Freak wristwatches in 2001. The first timepiece of this collection was the "Laboratory on the wrist" Freak watch. The model contains a revolutionary 7-day carrousel-tourbillon, and has no (true) dial, crown or hands. The movement contains silicon escapement components, and would rotate on itself to indicate time. The watch model was named "Watch of the Year" in innovation category in 2002. This use of silicon parts in a mechanical movement was an industry first. In 2005, the brand launched the "Freak Diamond Heart" watch, featuring a patented escapement made from synthetic diamonds. In 2007, the company presented a new material, Diamonsil, which combines silicium and synthetic diamonds. It eliminates friction and removes the need for lubrication of the escapement. The brand also launched the "Freak Diamonsil" watch, using this nanotechnology for the escapement. The same year, the brand released "Innovision 1" watch, featuring 10 innovations.

In 2017, the brand presented ten innovations, gathered within a new Freak watch, named "Innovision 2". One year later, the company launched the "Freak Vision" with three patents out of "Innovision 2" : "Grinder" winding system, constant power escapement and balance wheel in silicium with micro palets.

The current Freak model includes two series: Freak Out and Freak Vision (introduced in 2017).

In October 2025, Ulysse Nardin released the Freak S Enamel, offered with a brushed and polished titanium case and two colors: ruby red and turquoise blue. One month later, in November 2025, Ulysse Nardin unveiled their collaboration with URWERK releasing the watch UR-FREAK, a watch developed with a new movement, called UN-241 which is based on the movement UN-240.

=== Trilogy of Time ===
The first major advancement of the company after quartz crisis was the launch of "Trilogy of Time". This collection incorporated three different astronomical pieces starting in 1985 with the release of the Astrolabium Galileo Galilei, named after Italian astronomer Galileo Galilei. The Astrolabium displays local and solar time, the orbits and eclipses of the sun and the moon and the positions of several major stars. It was named by the Guinness Book of Records in 1989 as the world's most-functional watch (with 21 distinct functions).

Dr. Oechslin then followed the Astrolabium up with two other astronomical watches: in 1988 the Planetarium Copernicus (named after the stargazing theaters called planetariums and of astronomer Copernicus) and in 1992 the Tellurium Johannes Kepler (named after the Latin 'Tellus' meaning Earth, a Tellurian and astronomer Johannes Kepler). The Cloisonné dial of the Tellurium takes fifty-four processes, twelve baking operations and more than fifty hours of work by a skilled craftsman to transform a draft sketch on a small metal disc into a unique work of art - each and every Tellurium is unique.

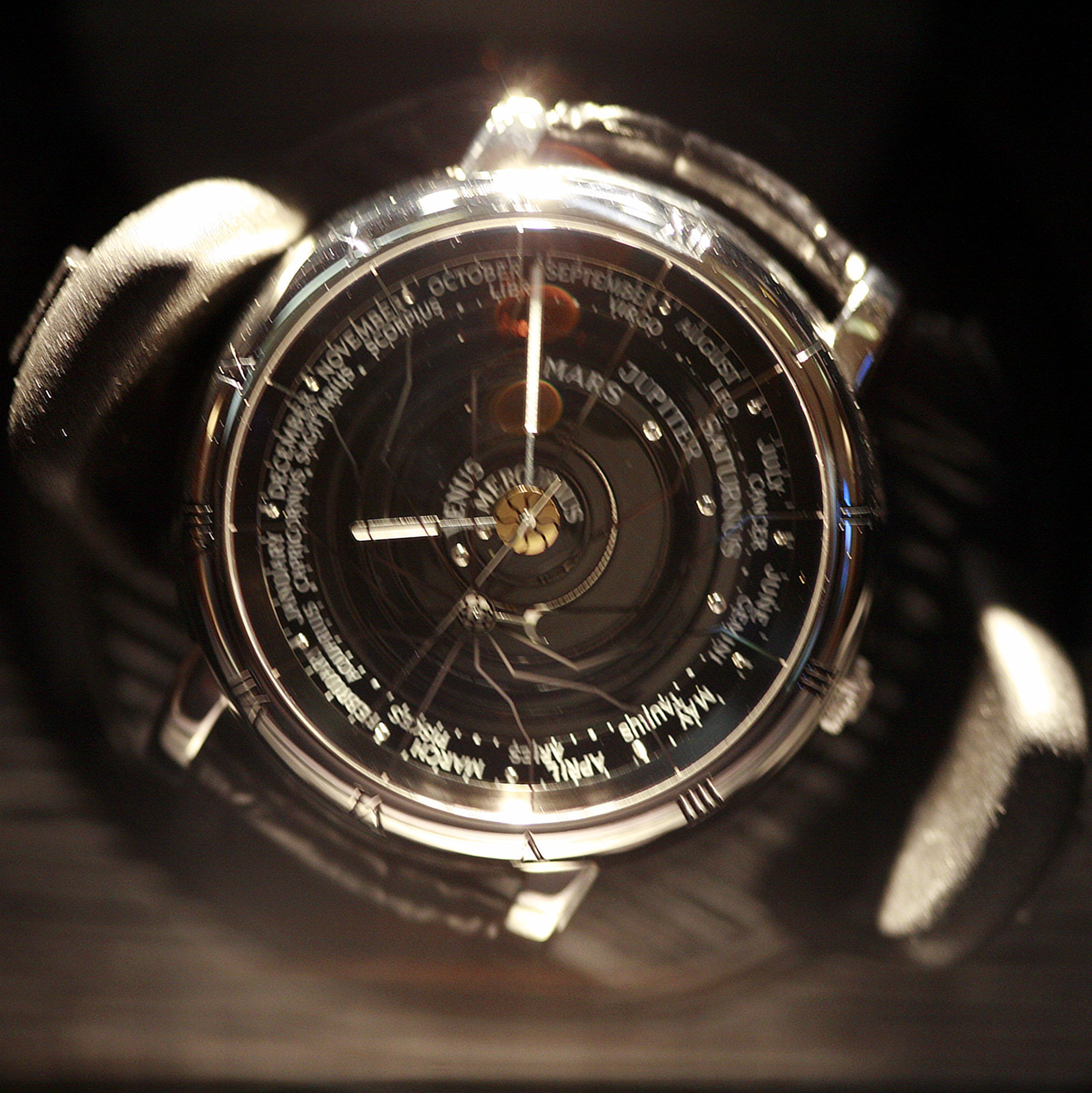
Planetarium Copernicus

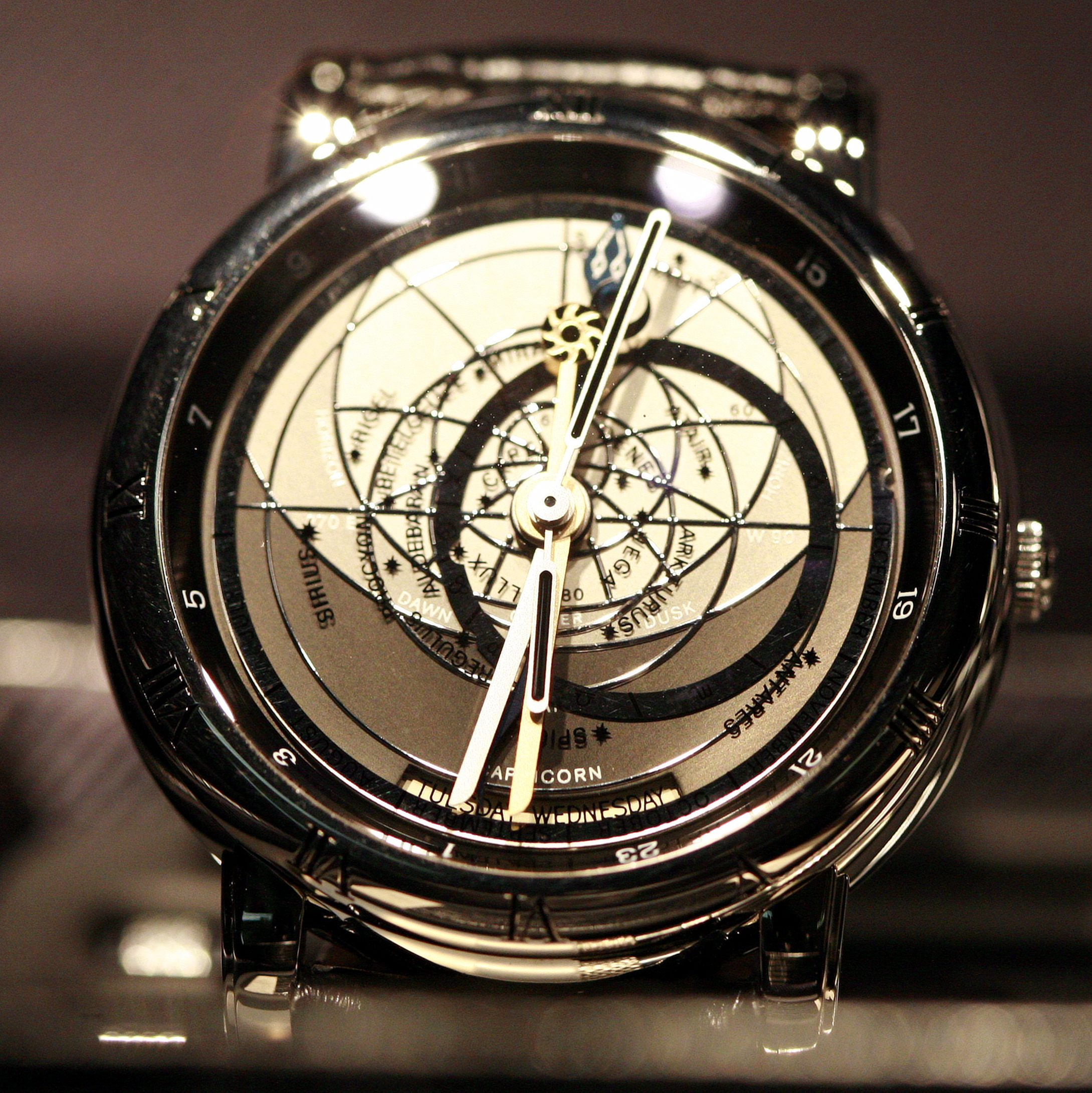
Astrolabium Galileo Galilei

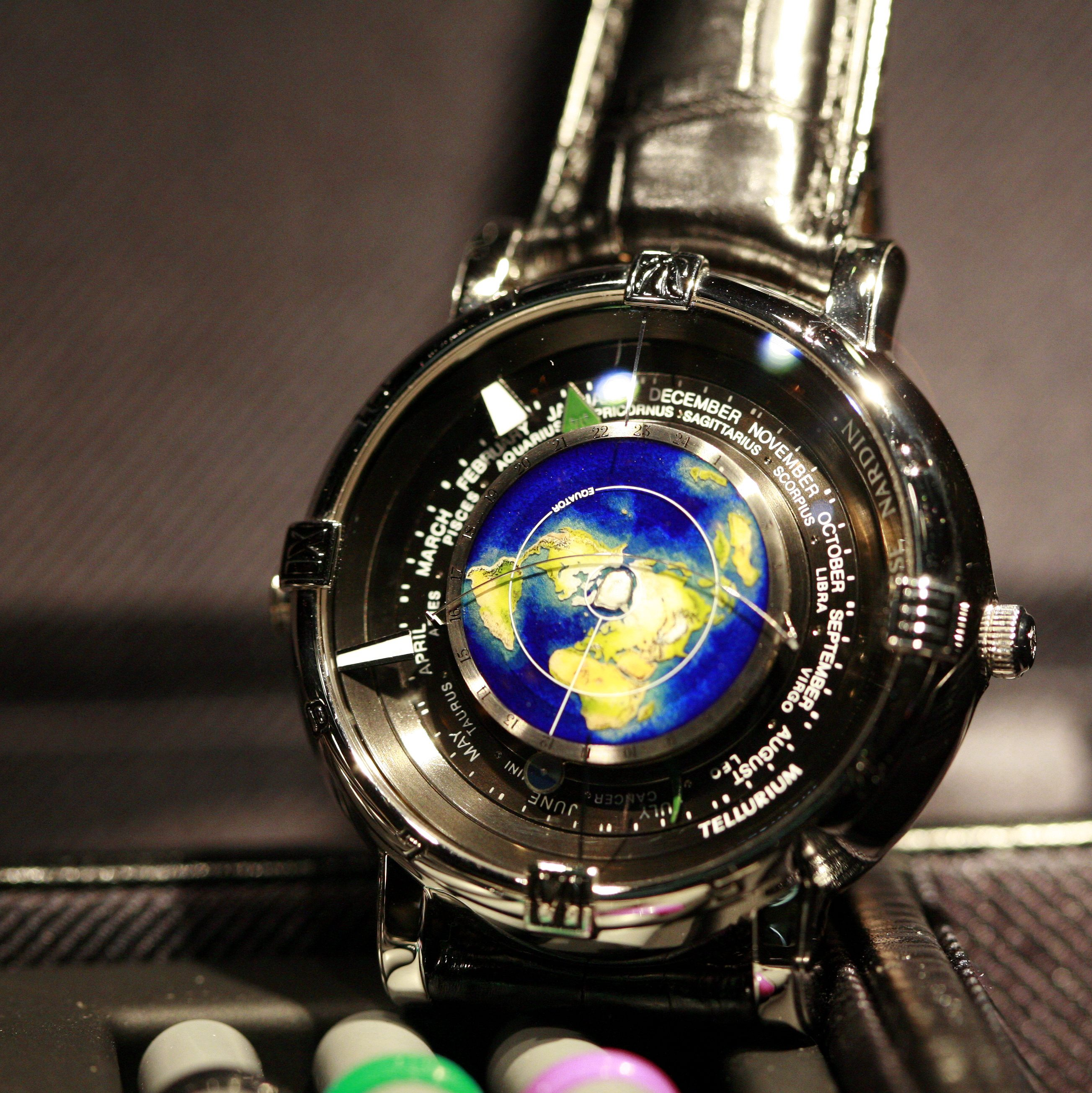
Tellurium Johannes Kepler

== Notable patrons and owners ==
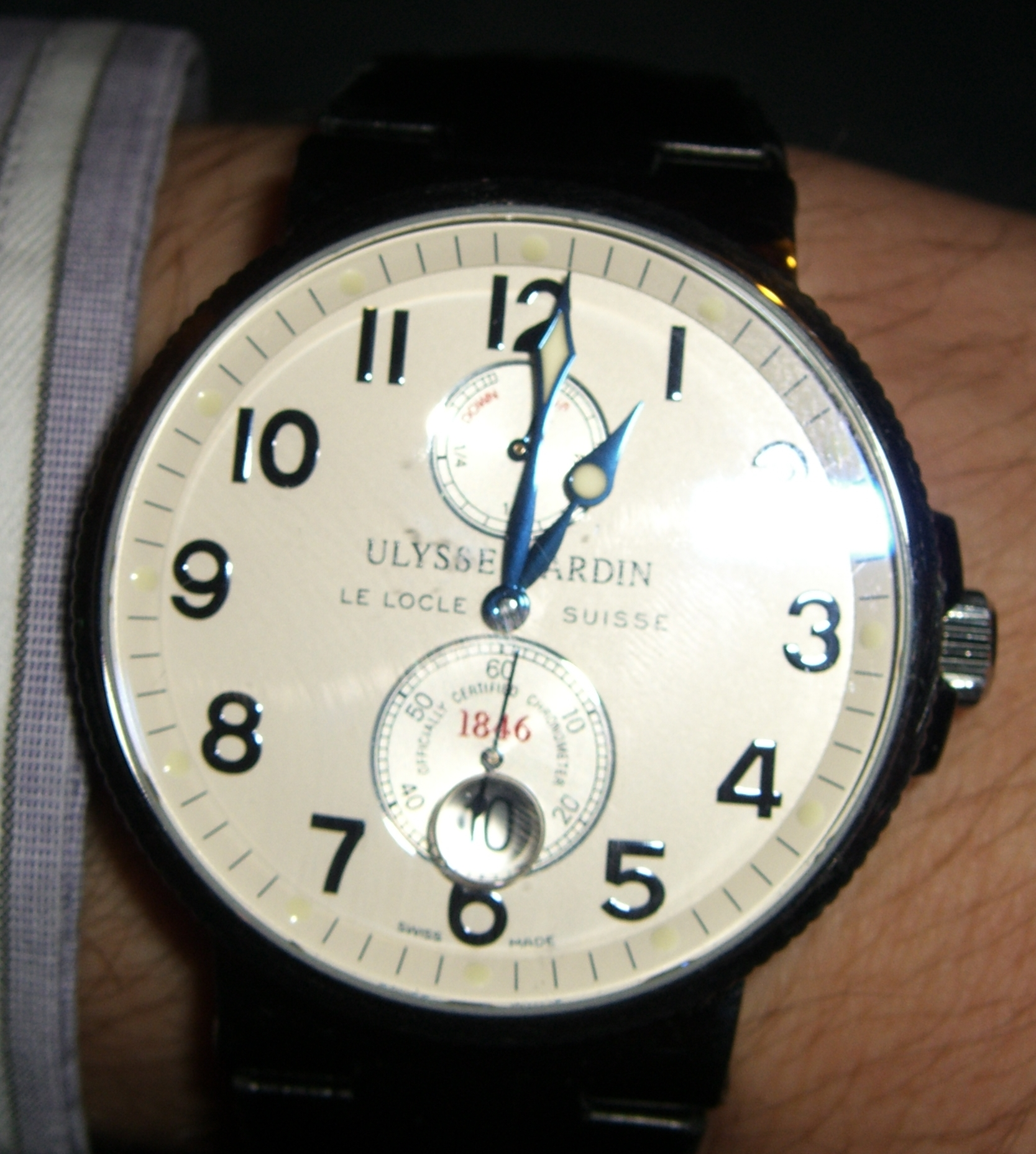
A Ulysse Nardin wristwatch

=== Athletes ===
- Randy Johnson, American former baseball player
- Michael Jordan, American former basketball player
- Mohammed Salah, Egyptian football player, playing now at FC Liverpool
- Tony Parker, French former basketball player
- Yuvraj Singh, Former cricket player

=== Celebrities ===
- Larry King, American TV host

=== Entrepreneurs ===
- Jeff Bezos, founder, chairman & CEO of Amazon

=== Russian Oligarch ===
- Yevgeny Prigozhin, founder, mercenary leader of Wagner Group

== Sponsorship ==
Every two years, the brand participates in Only Watch, a charity auction operated under the patronage of Prince Albert II, where watchmaking companies create timepieces to raise funds for research on neuromuscular diseases. In 2015, for the sixth edition of the Only Watch Charity Auction, the brand released the ”Only Watch Stranger” watch, equipped with a music box. On the hour, the watch plays Queen’s “We are the Champions” thanks to the copyright granted to Ulysse Nardin for its participation to the charity cause association. First introduced in 2013, the Stranger was named after Frank Sinatra’s 1966 song “Strangers in the Night” that the timepiece reproduced through a musical box mechanism.

Since 2017, Ulysse Nardin has been the official sponsor of Sweden's Artemis Racing team at the America's Cup race. The brand is also the official sponsor of Monaco Yacht Show and the Miami Yacht Show.

== See also ==
- List of watch manufacturers
- Manufacture d'horlogerie
