= Girard-Perregaux =

Swiss watch manufacturer

Coordinates: 47.09843°N 6.8163°E

Girard-Perregaux SA
- Company type: Subsidiary
- Industry: Luxury watchmaking
- Founded: 1791; 1852 (Girard & Cie)
- Founder: Jean-François Bautte; Constant Girard
- Headquarters: La Chaux-de-Fonds, Switzerland
- Area served: Worldwide
- Key people: Patrick Pruniaux
- Products: Watches
- Parent: Sowind Group
- Website: www.girard-perregaux.com

Girard-Perregaux SA (French: [ʒiʁaʁ pɛʁəɡo]) is a luxury Swiss watch manufacture with its origins dating back to 1791. In 2022, then-owner French luxury group Kering sold its stake in Sowind Group SA, the parent company of Girard-Perregaux, via management buyout. Headquartered in La Chaux-de-Fonds, Switzerland, the company opened the Girard-Perregaux Museum near its headquarters in Villa Marguerite in 1999. It is best known for the historic Tourbillon with three gold bridges, which was awarded a gold medal at the 1889 International Exposition in Paris soon after the launch of the watch. Other notable models from the company include the collection 1966, Vintage 1945, and models such as Tri-Axial Tourbillon and Laureato, an icon inspired from the 1970s.

== History ==
=== Early history ===
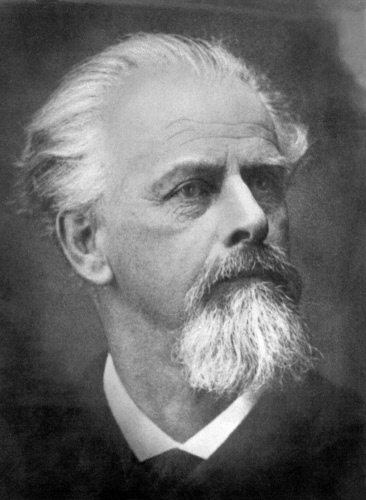
Constant Girard

In 1791, watchmaker and goldsmith Jean-François Bautte signed his first watches. He created a manufacturing company in Geneva, grouping for the first time ever all the watchmaking facets of that time. This included the engineering of the watch all the way to the final hand-assembly and hand-polishing of each piece. In 1832, Jacques Bautte and Jean-Samuel Rossel succeeded Jean Bautte, becoming the head of the company.

In 1852, the watchmaker Constant Girard founded Girard & Cie in La Chaux-de-Fonds, Switzerland. He then married Marie Perregaux in 1854, and the Girard-Perregaux Manufacture was founded in 1856. In 1906, Constant Girard-Gallet, who took over control of the Manufacture from his father, acquired the Bautte House and merged it with Girard-Perregaux & Cie.

=== Recent developments ===
Since the quartz crisis, the brand has pursued its activities by reinforcing from the 1980s its position in the domain of high-quality mechanical watches. Since late 1980s, Girard-Perregaux has been a part of the Swiss Sowind Group.

In 1999, the Villa Marguerite, a building in La Chaux-de-Fonds from the beginning of the 20th century, became the Girard-Perregaux Museum. A selection of old watches and documents illustrating the history of the brand was presented there, before its closure.

In 2011, Sowind Group, the Swiss holding incorporating Girard-Perregaux, became a subsidiary of the French luxury group Kering. In 2012, Girard-Perregaux launched the Le Corbusier Watch Trilogy, paying a tribute to the famous architect. In 2021, Girard-Perregaux partnered with the luxury car manufacturer Aston Martin.

== Watch manufacturing ==
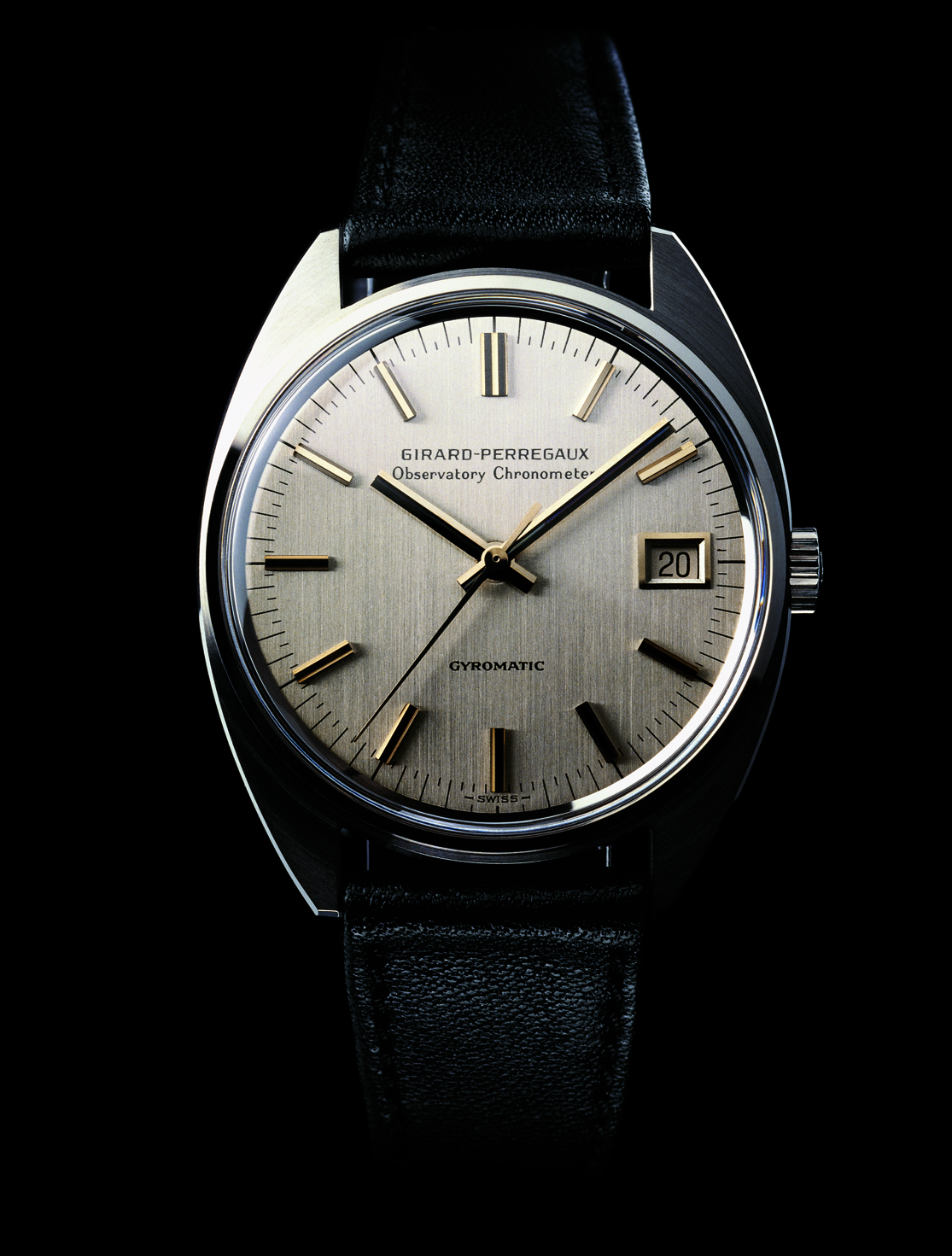
In 1965, Girard-Perregaux designed the first high-frequency mechanical movement, with the balance beating at 36,000 vibrations/hour: the Gyromatic HF

Girard-Perregaux relies on being a manufacturer of movements and watches, and a manufacturer of cases and bands. They bring together some tens of different components: watchmakers, engineers, movement decorators, polishers, etc. This global approach, founded on the traditional know-how of the watchmaking craftsmanship, allows them to create and direct high quality watches and movements from the assembly stages all the way to the final encasement.

Girard-Perregaux designs, manufactures and develops its own movements:

- a large collection of high-end watch making movements, of which the Tourbillon with three gold bridges is the emblematic piece.
- a complete range of mechanical movements at automatic reassembly (GP2700, GP3200, GP3300, GP4500), that can fit all the types of watches, all by serving as the base for the module constructions of mechanisms with complications.
- Quartz movements

=== Notable patents ===
The Manufacture has approximately 80 patents in the watchmaking domain and is the originator of many innovative concepts.

- 1965: Girard-Perregaux designed the first mechanical movement at high frequency, with the balance beating at 36,000 vibrations/hour: the Gyromatic HF.
- 1967: Girard-Perregaux received the Centenary Award from the Astronomical Observatory de Neuchâtel in recognition of the accomplishments of the Manufacture generally, and specifically for the Observatory Chronometer wristwatch that used the Gyromatic HF movement.
- 1970: Girard-Perregaux presented its first wristwatch to the world to be equipped with a quartz movement and the following year a second one which vibrates at 32,768 hertz, the frequency remaining the universal standard for quartz watches today.
- 2008: Girard-Perregaux presented prototypes of a constant-force escapement, distinguishing itself from all the other known escapements to this day. The first watch housing the constant escapement was presented in 2013.
- 2016: Girard-Perregaux re-launched its model Laureato, born in the 1970s, in the form of a limited edition of 225 timepieces. In 2017, the Laureato became a full collection.

== Notable models ==
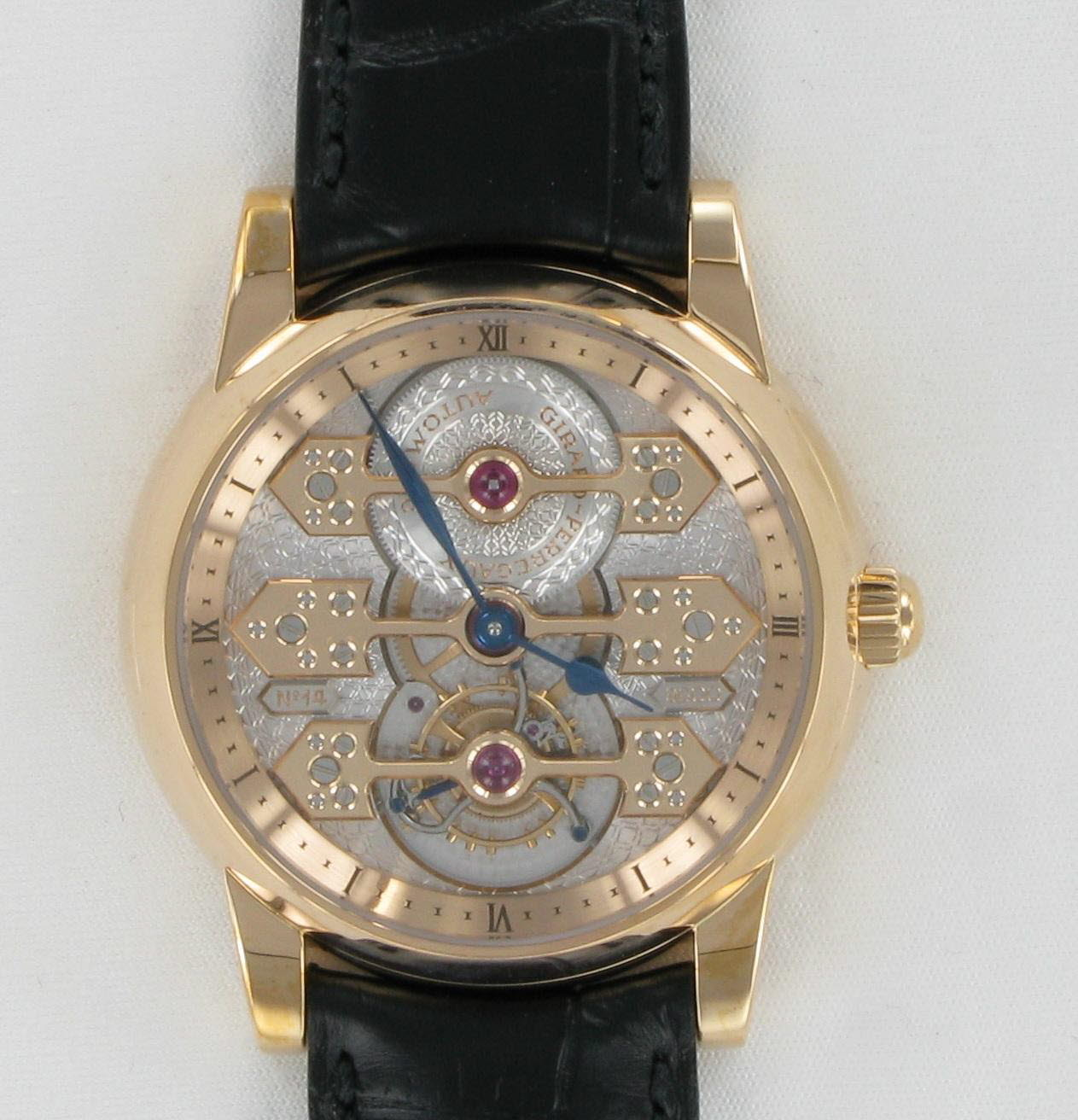
Tourbillon with three gold bridges

=== Tourbillon with three gold bridges ===
It is the emblematic model of Girard-Perregaux. In 1884, Constant Girard submitted to the United States Patent Office a patent of the design of the movement “Tourbillon with three gold bridges.” The three bridges were redesigned in the form of arrows and placed parallel to each other. The movement was no longer just a functional and technical element, but it also became an element of design in every way. In 1889, the Tourbillon with three gold bridges was awarded a gold medal at the Universal Exposition of Paris.

In 1980, Girard-Perregaux decided to make 20 pieces to conform to the original of 1889: 1500 hours of work were necessary to create the first one. To celebrate its bicentenary in 1991, the company created a miniaturized wristwatch version of its famed Tourbillon with three gold Bridges. Since then, it is offered in different versions, and is sometimes associated with other watchmakers’ complications.

=== Vintage 1945 ===
Vintage 1945 has a rectangular case and a design inspired by an Art Deco style watch dating back to 1945. The Vintage 1945 is powered by the Girard-Perregaux 9600-0019, mechanical self-winding movement, an all in-house movement.

=== Girard-Perregaux 1966 ===
In 2012, Girard-Perregaux introduced a new Girard-Perregaux 1966 Full Calendar and a 1966 Chronograph, which has been highlighted as a new grand classic by Girard-Perregaux themselves. This Girard-Perregaux 1966 is a slightly larger faced model than previously issued by the watchmaker at 42 mm and may be a sign of the changing demands upon watchmakers by the watch enthusiast community.

=== Laureato ===
The Laureato was born in 1975. Its original design featured an integrated bracelet and an octagonal bezel. In the 1980s, the Laureato models mostly featured quartz movements.

In 1995, to celebrate the Laureato’s 20th anniversary, the Manufacture decided to relaunch the model, this time equipped with a calibre GP3100 automatic movement, with three hands and a date. In 2005, a sportier version of the Laureato, named the Evo3, designating the model’s third major evolution, was presented. In 2016, for the 225th Anniversary of the brand, the Laureato collection returned to centre stage thanks to a re-design of its lines, aimed to be as close as possible to its original features: octagonal bezel and fully-integrated bracelet were back. However, the movement fitted into the steel case was not a quartz, but a GP3300 movement.

Since 2017, new models combining different case materials, such as pink gold, titanium, steel and ceramic, along with blue, black or silver hobnail-pattern ("Clou de Paris") dial have joined the Laureato collection. The latest addition is a sapphire case model, presented in 2020, the Laureato Absolute Light.

=== Olimpico ===
First introduced in 1968 to commemorate the Olympic Games in Mexico City, Girard-Perregaux introduced the Olimpico, a series of chronographs intended for release every four years to coincide with the Olympic Games. While never an official Olympic timekeeper (a role traditionally held by brands like Omega), the Olimpico served as a limited, commemorative collection. The series remained in production until 1996, spanning several distinct case shapes and movements. The line was discontinued in 1996 following licensing dispute with the International Olympic Committee.

== Notable patrons and owners ==
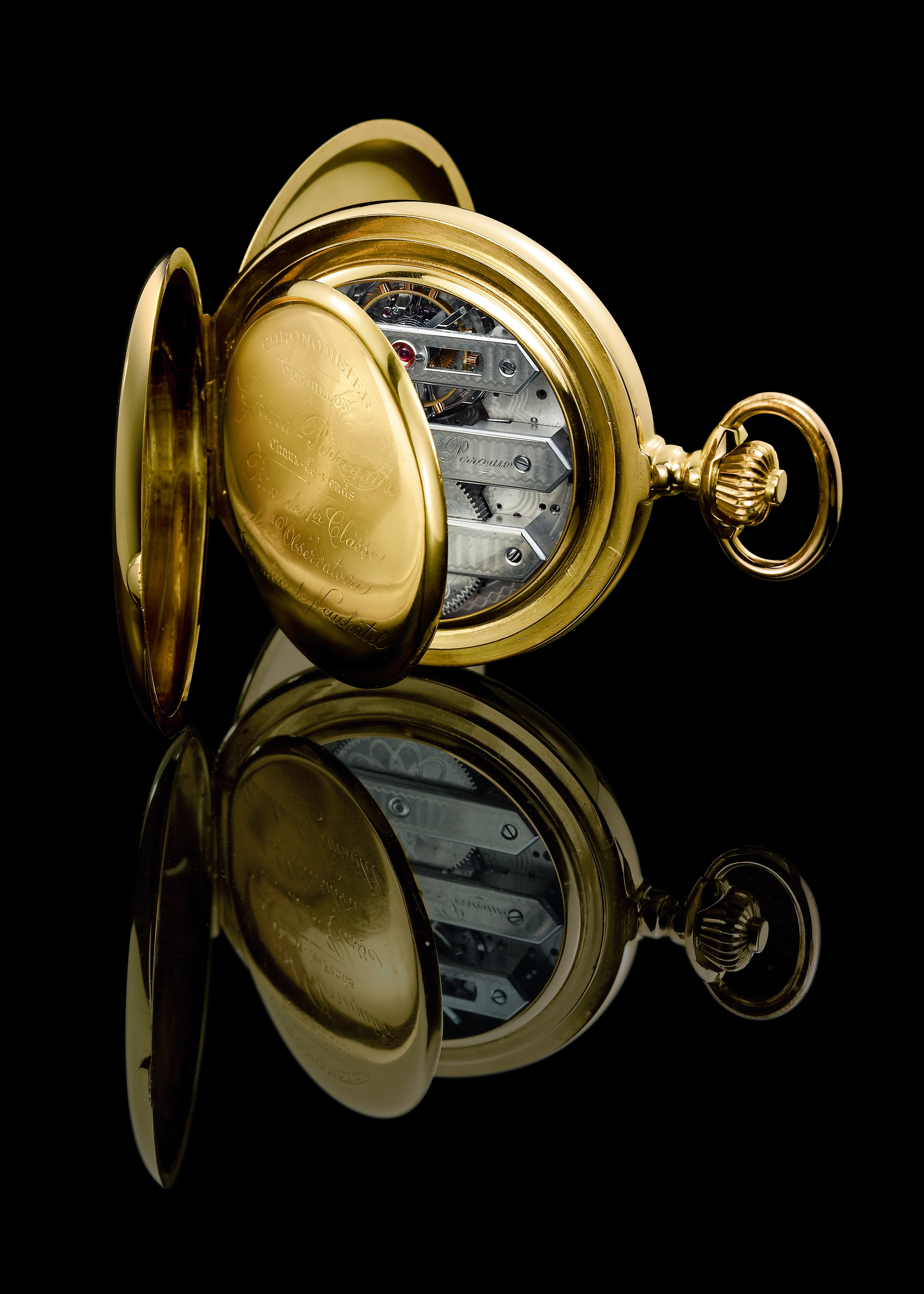
An award-winning Girard-Perregaux pocket watch

- Quentin Tarantino, American film director & screenwriter
- Kobe Bryant, American basketball player
- Pierce Brosnan, Irish-American actor
- Bruce Blakeman, American politician
- Hugh Jackman, Australian actor
- Nicolas Sarkozy, 23rd President of France
- Farouk of Egypt, King of Egypt
- Queen Victoria, Queen of the United Kingdom

== See also ==
- List of watch manufacturers
- Manufacture d'horlogerie
