= Sowind Group SA =

Watchmaking collective

Sowind Group
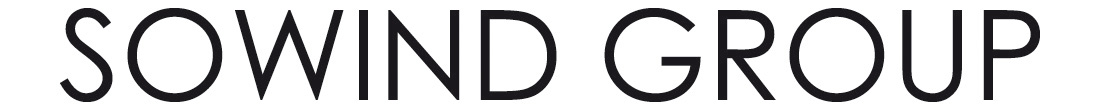
- Industry: Watchmaking
- Headquarters: La Chaux-de-Fonds, Switzerland
- Number of locations: La Chaux-de-Fonds, Le Locle
- Area served: Worldwide
- Key people: Patrick Pruniaux
- Products: Watches
- Brands: Girard-Perregaux; Ulysse Nardin

The Sowind Group SA is an independent parent company of the Girard-Perregaux and Ulysse Nardin Swiss watch brands.

Based in La Chaux-de-Fonds, the Group incorporates the Girard-Perregaux and Ulysse Nardin brands, that develops and produces a complete portfolio of high-end movements (more than 100 variations of existing movements) and collections of top-of-the-range watches.

== History ==
In June 2008, Sowind Group signed a long-term strategic partnership with Kering, which acquired a 23% stake. Kering increased its ownership to 50.1% in July 2011.

The brands were acquired in 2011 and 2014, respectively.

== See also ==
- List of watch manufacturers

== Bibliography ==
- François Chaille, Girard-Perregaux, Editions Flammarion, 2004, ISBN 2-08-011069-1
- ArmbandUhren, Special Girard-Perregaux, Peter Braun, 2007, ISBN 978-3-89880-808-8
