= Grand Prix d'Horlogerie de Genève =

Annual awards for horological achievements

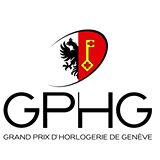
- The GPHG logo
- Awarded for: Excellence in horology
- Country: Switzerland
- Presented by: Foundation of the Grand Prix
- First award: November 13, 2001; 25 years ago
- Website: www.gphg.org

Most recent GPHG winners
- Best in watches in 2025
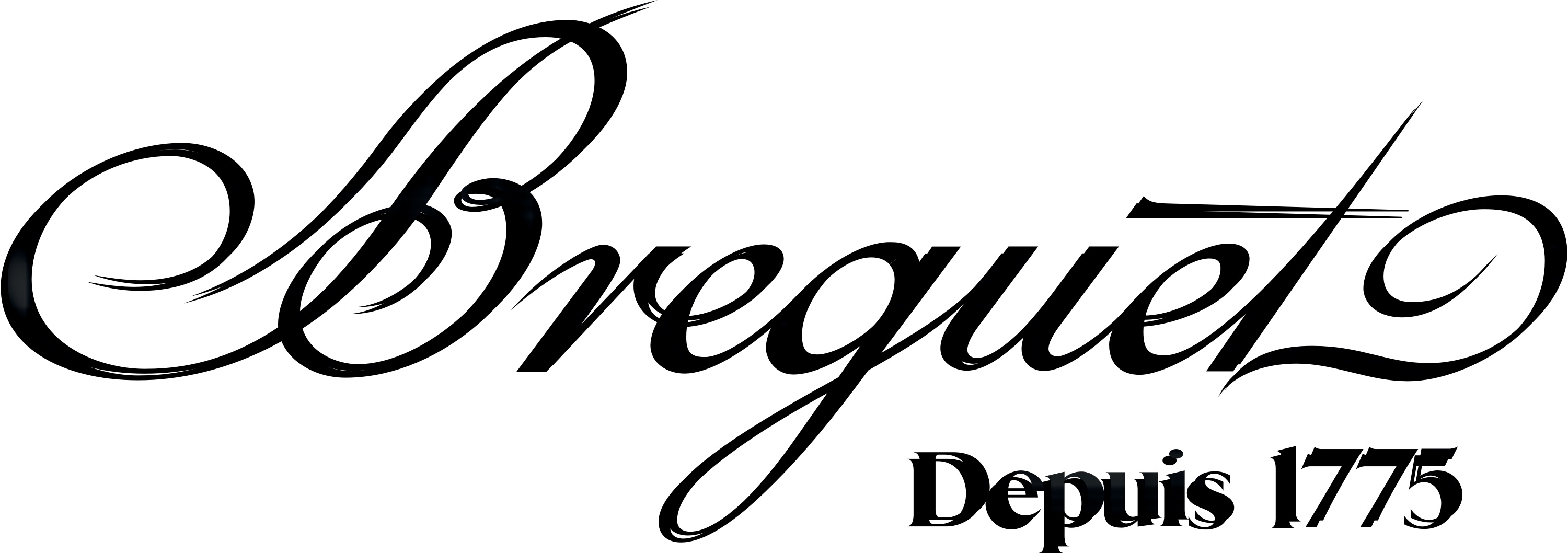

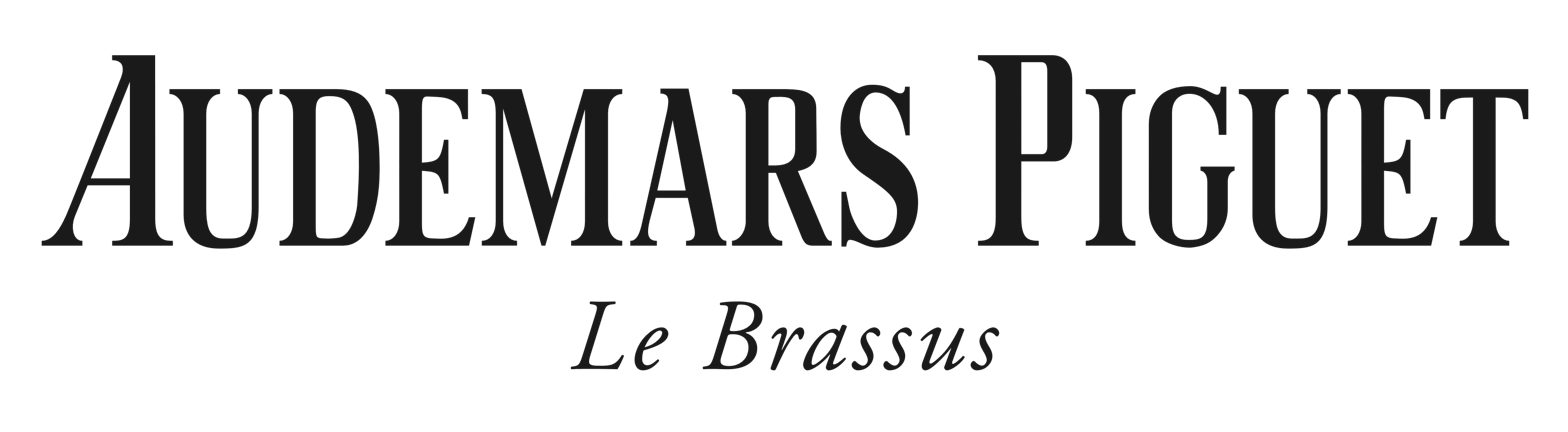

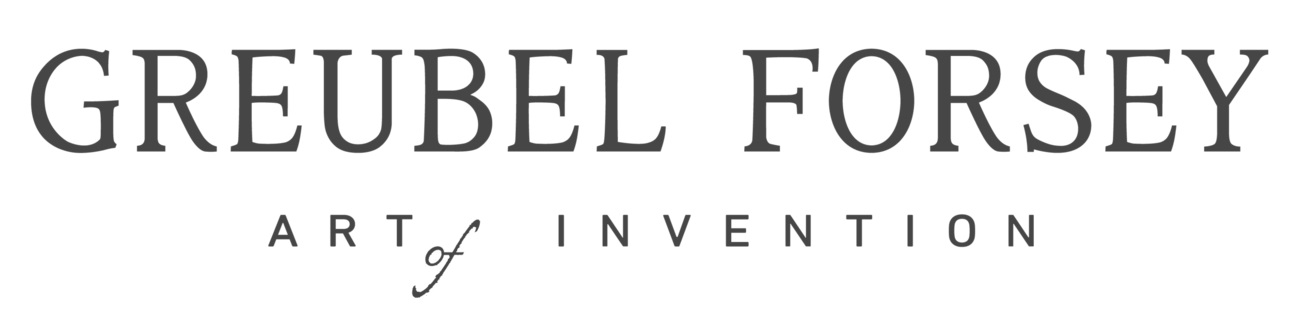
Award	Aiguille d'Or	Chronometry Prize
Winner	Breguet (Classique Souscription)	Zenith (G.F.J. Calibre 135)
Award	Iconic Watch Prize	Mechanical Exception Watch Prize
Winner	Audemars Piguet (Royal Oak Perpetual Calendar)	Greubel Forsey (Nano Foudroyante)

The Grand Prix d'Horlogerie de Genève, commonly known as the GPHG (in English: Geneva Watchmaking Grand Prix) are awards for artistic and technical merit in horology. They are presented annually by the Foundation of the Grand Prix in Geneva in recognition of excellence in watchmaking, following a vote by a jury and the GPHG Academy. The awards are widely regarded to be the most prestigious awards in the watch world. As of 2026, the President of the Jury is Wei Koh.

== History ==
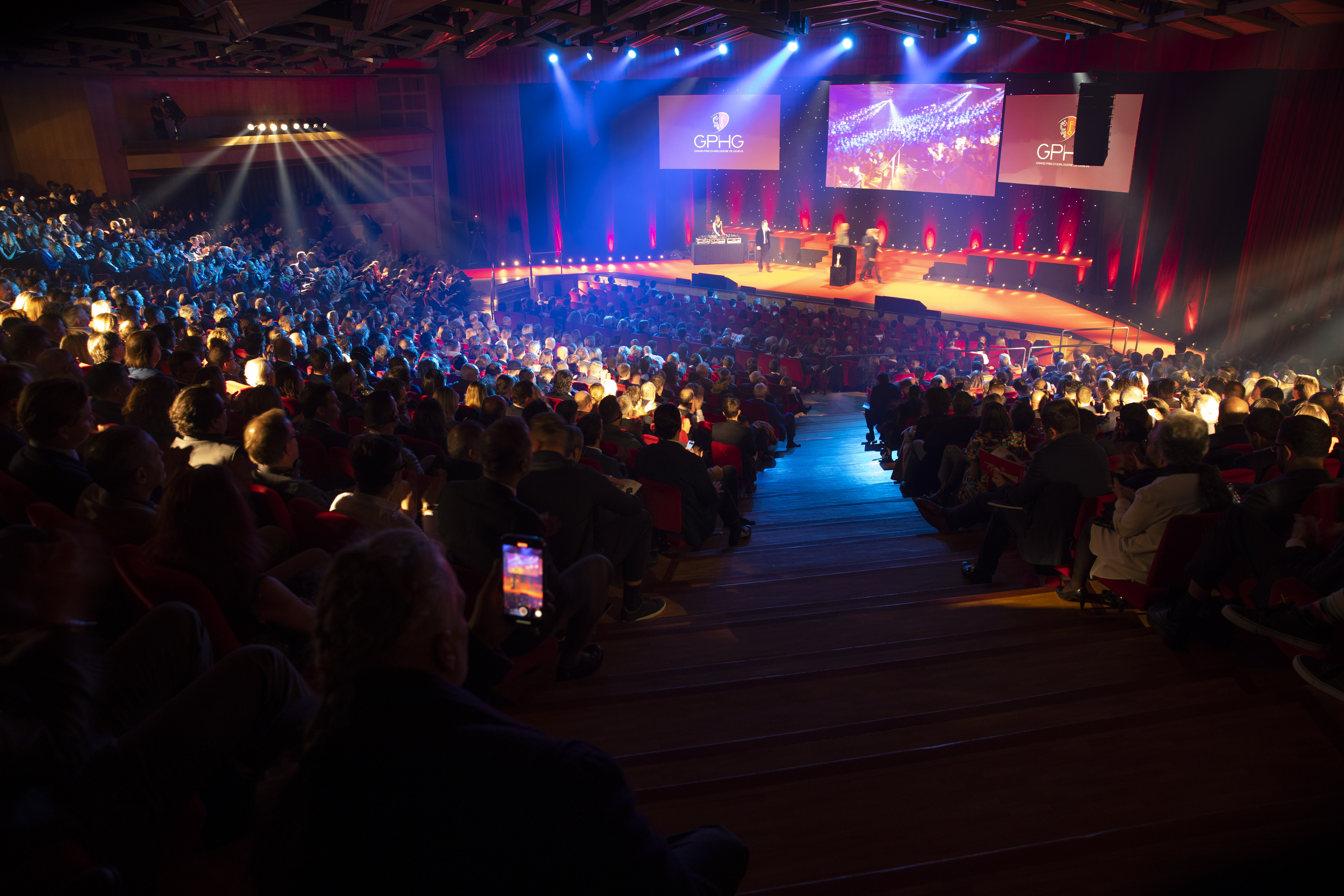
The 2023 Award Ceremony

The GPHG awards ceremony started in 2001 and is celebrated every year in November to award the international watchmaking profession, often with over 1000 guests. It has been described as the Oscars of watchmaking.

The GPHG's mission is to highlight and annually recognize the excellence of contemporary watchmaking productions on an international level by awarding prizes to creations and industry players whose creativity or contribution have left a mark.

The ceremony is broadcast live on the GPHG website and through various media partners. The ceremony is followed by an exclusive gala dinner attended by around 300 people, including leaders of major brands and their guests.

== Latest Winners ==
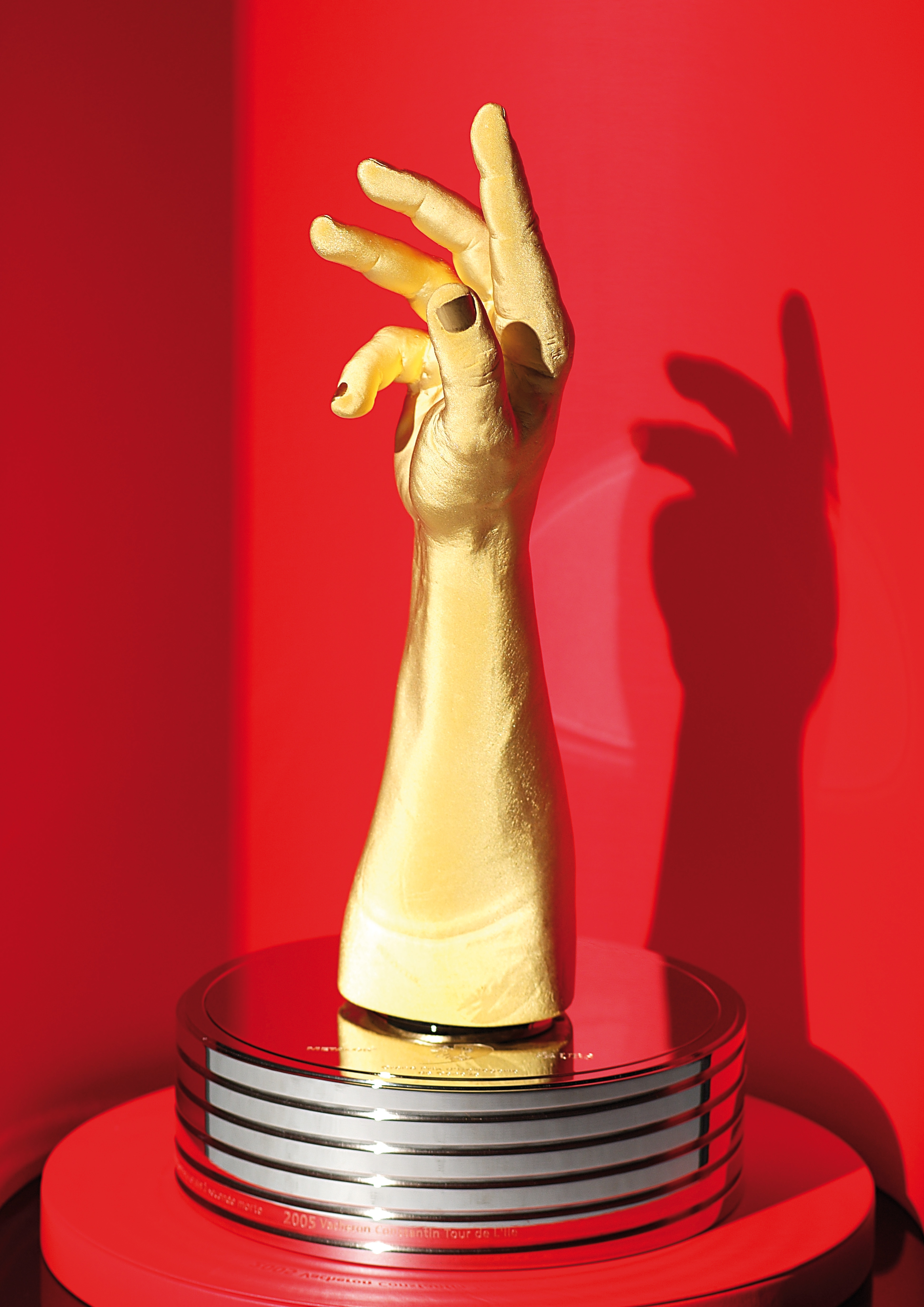
The Trophy

The Grand Prix awarded 20 prizes in 2026:

=== Main Awards 2025 ===
Winner	Brand	Model
Aiguille d’Or Grand Prix	Breguet	Classique Souscription
Chronograph Watch Prize	Zenith	GFJ Calibre 135
Iconic Watch Prize	Audemars Piguet	Royal Oak Perpetual Calendar
Mechanical Exception Watch Prize	Greubel Forsey	Nano Foudroyante
Ladies’ Watch Prize	Gérald Genta	Gentissima Oursin Fire Opal
Ladies’ Complication Watch Prize	Chopard	Imperiale Four Seasons
Men's Watch Prize	Urban Jürgensen	UJ-2
Men's Complication Watch Prize	Bovet 1822	Récital 30
Tourbillon Watch Prize	Bulgari	Octo Finissimo Ultra Tourbillon
Sports Watch Prize	Chopard	Alpine Eagle 41 SL Cadence 8HF
Time Only Watch Prize	Daniel Roth	Extra Plat Rose Gold
Jewellery Watch Prize	Dior	La D de Dior Buisson Couture
Artistic Crafts Watch Prize	Voutilainen	28GML SOUYOU
Petite Aiguille Prize	MAD Editions	MAD2 Green
Challenge Watch Prize	Dennison	Natural Stone Tiger Eye In Gold

=== Special Awards 2025 ===
Winner	Brand/Person	Model
Audacity Prize	Fam Al Hut	Möbius
Horological Revelation Prize	Anton Suhanov	St Petersburg Easter Egg Tourbillon Clock
Chronometry Prize	Zenith	G.F.J. Calibre 135
Special Jury Prize	Alain Dominique Perrin	

== Aiguille d'Or Winners ==
Year	Winner	Model
2001	Vacheron Constantin	Lady Kalla
2002	Patek Philippe	5102 Ciel Lune
2003	Patek Philippe	5101
2004	F.P. Journe	Tourbillon Souverain à Seconde Morte
2005	Vacheron Constantin	Tour de l'Île
2006	F.P. Journe	Sonnerie Souveraine
2007	Richard Mille	RM 012
2008	F.P. Journe	Centigraphe Souverain
2009	A. Lange & Söhne	Lange Zeitwerk
2010	Greubel Forsey	Double Tourbillon 30° Historical Edition
2011	De Bethune	DB28
2012	TAG Heuer	Mikrogirder
2013	Girard-Perregeaux	Échappement Constant L.M.
2014	Breguet	Classique Chronométrie
2015	Greubel Forsey	Tourbillon Vision
2016	Ferdinand Berthoud	FB1
2017	Chopard	L.U.C. Full Strike
2018	Bovet 1822	Récital 22 Grand Récital
2019	Audemars Piguet	Royal Oak Quantième Perpétuel
2020	Piaget	Altiplano Ultimate
2021	Bvlgari	Octo Finissimo
2022	MB&F	Legacy Machine Sequential Evo
2023	Audemars Piguet	Code 11.59
2024	IWC Schaffhausen	Portugieser Eternal Calendar
2025	Breguet	Classique Souscription
2026	Rexhep Rexhepi	Chronograph Flyback

== List of Awards ==
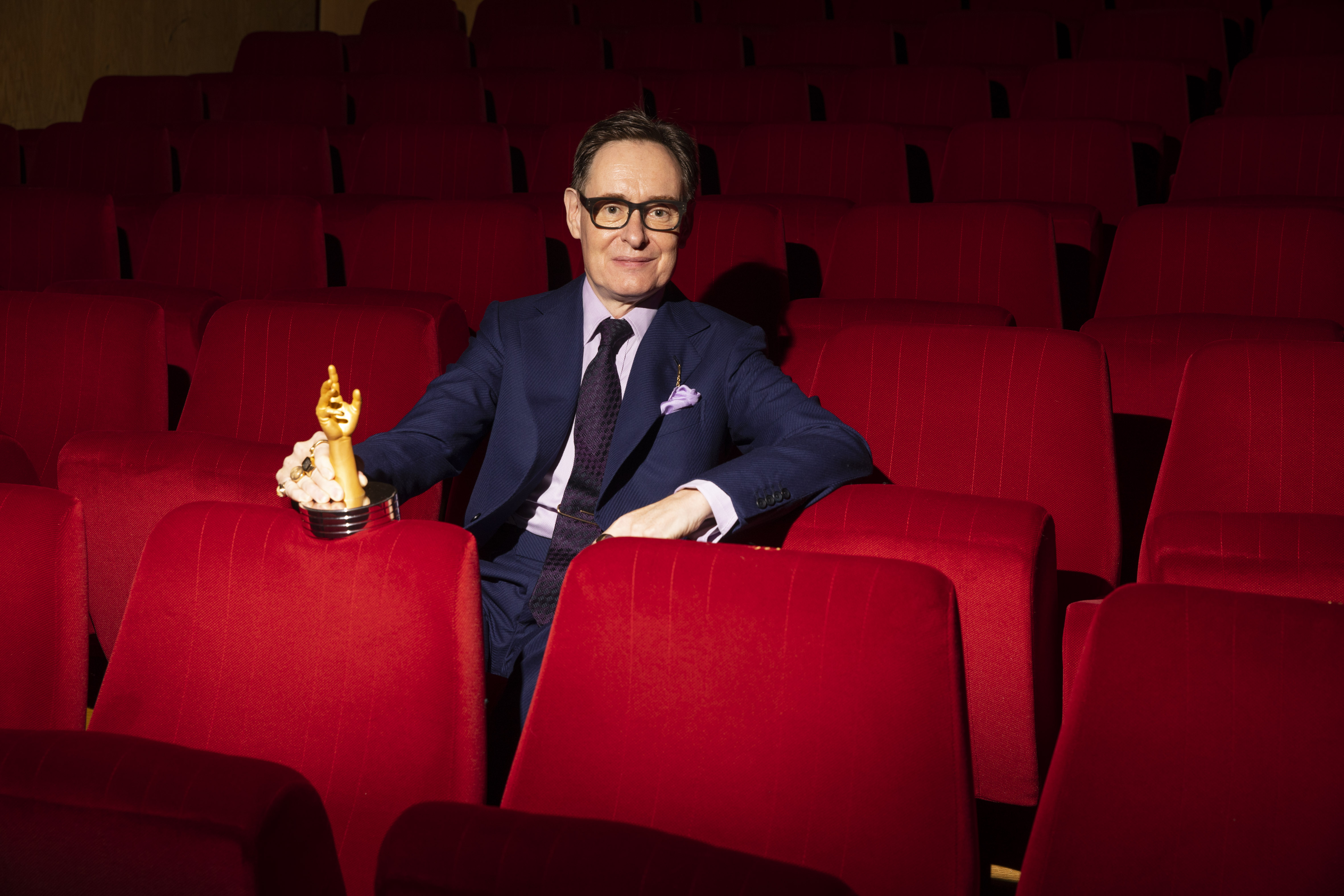
Former President of the jury, Nicholas Foulkes (2019-2025)

The GPHG usually awards 16 main awards:

- Aiguille d’Or Grand Prix
- Chronograph Watch Prize
- Iconic Watch Prize
- Mechanical Exception Watch Prize
- Essential Watch Prize
- Gemset Watch Prize
- Complication Watch Prize
- Calendar and Astronomy Watch Prize
- Tourbillon Watch Prize
- Sports Watch Prize
- Time Only Watch Prize
- Mechanical Clock Prize
- Jewellery Watch Prize
- Artistic Crafts Watch Prize
- Petite Aiguille Prize
- Challenge Watch Prize

And 5 special awards:

- Audacity Prize
- Horological Revelation Prize
- Iconic Watch Prize
- Chronometry Prize
- Special Jury Prize

== Event ==
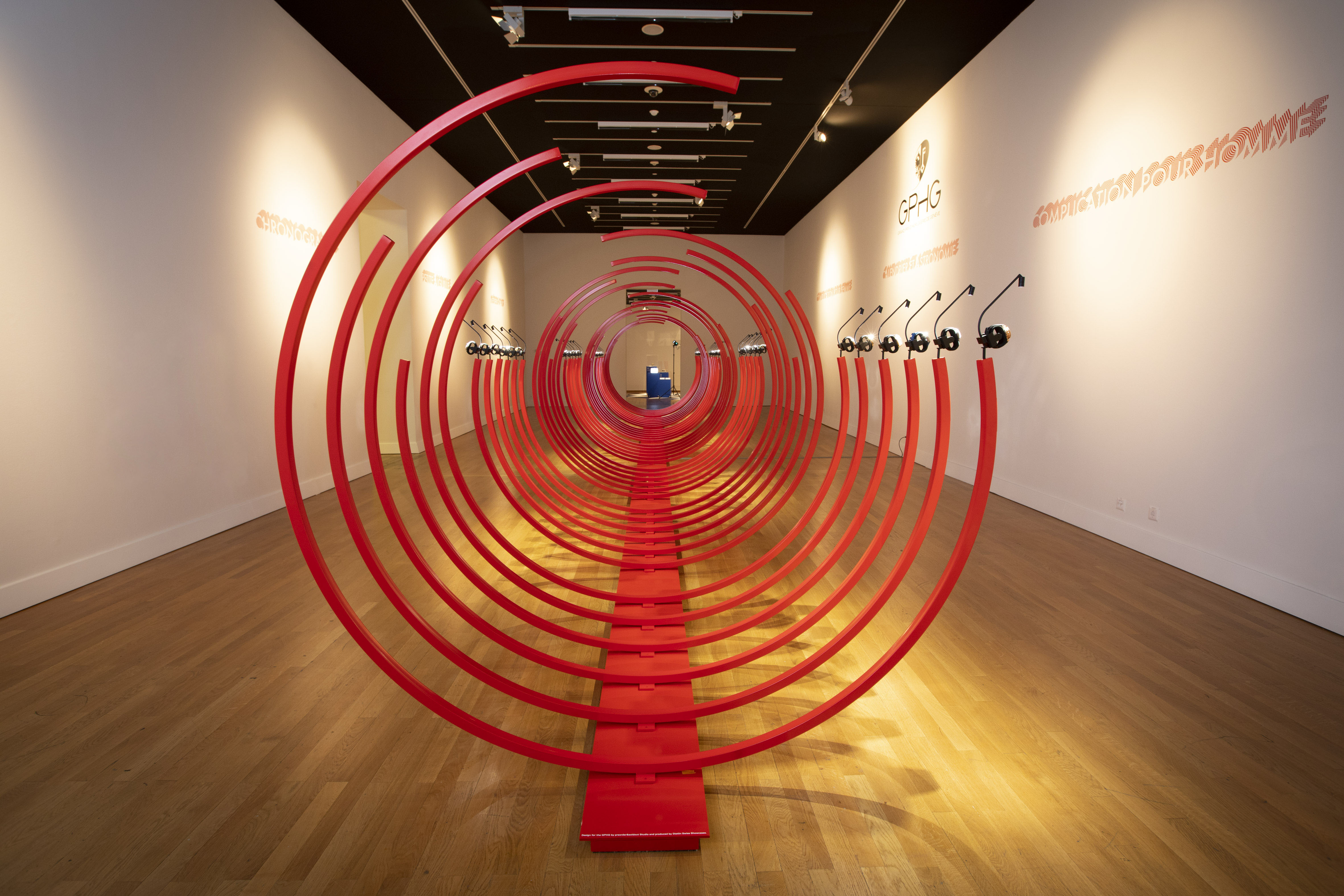
The 2023 exhibition

The ceremony is often preceded by an annual exhibition at the Musée Rath in Geneva is a highlight of the cultural and watchmaking calendar of the City of Geneva. The 84 timepieces preselected by the GPHG Academy are presented there in a bold scenography, designed for the GPHG.

In addition, a cultural mediation program is offered to the many visitors and schools: introductory watchmaking workshops, led by the Geneva Watchmaking School, guided tours of the exhibition by experts, lectures, and interactive activities.

== See also ==
- Canton of Geneva
- Complication
- Horology
- List of watch manufacturers
