= Tom Chamberlin =

British editor

- Born: Thomas Frederick Chamberlin; February 1987 (age 39); United Kingdom
- Education: University of the West of England (UWE)
- Occupations: Writer; Podcaster
- Employer: The Rake

Thomas Frederick Chamberlin (born February 1987) is a British editor and journalist based in London. He is best known as the editor-in-chief of The Rake, a bimonthly magazine dedicated to luxury menswear, style, and culture. He is also the founder and host of The Luxury Dispatch podcast.

Chaimberlin is the author of Huntsman: Redefining Savile Row (2024), published by Vendome Press and co-written by Glenda Bailey and Nick Foulkes, documenting the history and working practices of the tailoring house Huntsman.

== Career ==
Chamberlin serves as editor-in-chief of The Rake. His journalist profile on Muck Rack lists him as an editor at the magazine and credits him with bylines in publications including The Telegraph and The Times.

In 2024, Chamberlin published Huntsman: Redefining Savile Row with Vendome Press. The book is a 304-page illustrated volume produced in collaboration with photographer Simon Upton, with a foreword by Glenda Bailey and an introduction by Nick Foulkes. According to the publisher, the book examines the history of Huntsman, its role on Savile Row, and the bespoke tailoring process, including client fittings and garment construction.

== Selected bibliography ==
- Chamberlin, Tom. Huntsman: Redefining Savile Row. Vendome Press, 2024. ISBN 978-0-86565-448-8
