= Memorigin =

Hong Kong manufactured watch brand

- Company type: Privately held company
- Industry: Watch manufacturing / branding
- Founded: 2011
- Founder: William Shum
- Headquarters: Hong Kong, China
- Website: Memorigin.com

Memorigin is a Hong Kong manufactured watch brand, which was founded by William Shum in 2011. The brand specializes in tourbillon watches, which are often associated with luxury Swiss watch brands. The tourbillon movement is only manufactured in a handful of factories worldwide, traditionally retailing at high five or six figure prices (USD). Memorigin's founder decided that he could produce a quality mid-range tourbillon, which he would sell directly into the growing Chinese watch market.

== History ==
William Shum founded the watch brand Memorigin in 2011, and the brand is based in Hong Kong, China. Shum attended university in America, majoring in both finance and economics. He studied undergraduate at the University of Southern California and later on obtained a master's degree at Cornell University. He moved back to Hong Kong, where he secured a job in investment banking, after graduating from Cornell. In 2008, he decided to pursue a different career with a more favorable work-life balance. He and his father both had an interest in tourbillon watches, with his father being one of the investors in a watch factory in Hangzhou, China. The factory had been producing tourbillon movements since 2000.

Like many Chinese manufacturers, the factory Shum's father invested in had the technical know-how to produce elegant watch movements but no experience in creating a watch brand and taking it to market. At the time of the foundation of Memorigin, Shum was quoted saying, “there were only about 30 factories in the entire world making tourbillon, and only a few in China.” During the same interview with the NY Times, Shum stated that Swiss tourbillon watches in the market were limited and expensive. He felt that there was an opportunity to sell unique tourbillons into the watch market at more affordable prices.

== Watches ==
=== Models ===
The first watch model sold by the brand was the 2011 edition of the 'Antique', which retailed for $3,800. Since its launch, the watchmaker has moved into high-end collectibles, such as their 2013 'Emperor Jade' model. The 'Emperor Jade' contained translucent sheets of precious hand-carved stones. This particular model was at the higher-end of the Memorigin range, priced at $38,000.

Memorigin has also designed watches to be used as movie-themed merchandise in collaboration with global brands. Their Marvel watch collection featured well-known characters on the watch faces, such as Iron Man and Captain America. They have also designed watches for Hollywood merchandise, including Warner Brothers and Hasbro. They made Batman and Superman memorabilia watches for Warner Brothers and Transformers watches for Hasbro. This focus on superheroes is due to the Chinese interest in comics and the subsequent movies produced by various Hollywood studios. Shum stated, "most Hongkongers between the ages of 30 and 50 like superheroes, because we grew up with many of them, and they represent justice."

When asked about the difference between Chinese tourbillons and Swiss tourbillons, Shum stated "Chinese watches are developing and the target customers are not the same as those who buy exclusively Swiss watches. Swiss watches are produced in fewer quantities with a strong passion for traditional design and delicate functions. Chinese watches are now produced in larger quantities with more reasonable pricing."

=== Design ===
The tourbillon watches made by Memorigin are unique because they fuse Chinese and Western design elements. When founding Memorigin, Shum stated he wanted to create watches that possess "Swiss precision with Chinese characteristics.”

In an interview with Forbes, Shum stated that Memorigin watches are often designed in collaboration with well-known Hong Kong watch collectors. Memorigin has always stated their interest in becoming a tailor-made watch brand, rather than a mass producer.
