= Bovet =

Bovet is a surname. Notable people with the surname include:

- Daniel Bovet (1907–1992), Swiss-born Italian pharmacologist
- Édouard Bovet (1797–1849), Swiss watchmaker
  - Bovet Fleurier, Swiss watch company founded by Édouard Bovet
- George Bovet (1874–1946), Swiss politician
- Guy Bovet (born 1942), Swiss organist and composer
- Jorys Bovet (born 1993), French politician
