= The Rake =

British bimonthly men's magazine

- Editor: Tom Chamberlin
- Categories: Culture
- Frequency: Bimonthly
- Founder: Wei Koh
- First issue: 2008
- Country: United Kingdom
- Language: English
- Website: https://therake.com

The Rake is a British bimonthly men's magazine that focuses on luxury fashion, culture, and style. It was founded in 2008 by Wei Koh, a Singapore-based entrepreneur and publisher.

== History ==
Launched in 2008 in Singapore, The Rake was conceived as a publication focused on high-end watches and luxury goods. The magazine was published in several languages across international editions.

During the 2008 financial crisis, The Rake was launched in response to what its founder saw as a lack of men's lifestyle publications focused on classic style and craftsmanship.

Initially based in Singapore, it is now based in London. The editor of The Rake is Tom Chamberlin.
