= Bovet Fleurier =

Watch company

Bovet Fleurier SA
- Type: Privately held company
- Industry: Watchmaking
- Founded: 1 May 1822; 204 years ago in London, United Kingdom
- Founder: Édouard Bovet
- Headquarters: Geneva, Switzerland
- Products: Wristwatches
- Website: www.bovet.com

Bovet Fleurier SA is a Swiss brand of luxury watchmakers chartered 1 May 1822 in London, United Kingdom by Édouard Bovet. It is most noted for its pocket watches manufactured for the Chinese market in the 19th century. Today it produces high-end artistic watches (priced between US$18,000 and $2.5 million) with a style that references its history.

The company is known for its high-quality dials (such as the Fleurier Miniature Painting models), engraving and its seven-day tourbillon. The original Bovet watches were also among the first to emphasize the beauty of their movements with skeletonized views and highly decorative movements. Bovet watches were also among the first to include a second hand while the company has a tradition of employing women artisans, which is rare for traditional watch making companies in Europe. Pascal Raffy is the current owner.

== History ==
=== Fleurier, home of Bovet ===
Watch making was introduced to Fleurier by Daniel-Jean-Jacques-Henri Vaucher, an apprentice of Daniel Jeanrichard, in 1730. At the time the area was known for metal working, a natural result of the iron deposits discovered locally in the 15th century. Watchmaking flourished in and around Fleurier during the late 18th century but because production was sold on credit for the international markets, prices were undercut and economic destabilization brought about by the Napoleonic Wars caused watch making in the area to decrease significantly. By the mid-19th century, Fleurier produced watches almost exclusively for the Chinese market while the municipality's current renown as a watch making centre is attributed to Bovet watches.

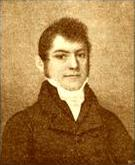
Édouard Bovet (1797–1849), founder of Bovet Fleurier.

=== The founder ===
Édouard Bovet (1797–1849) was the son of the watchmaker Jean-Frédéric Bovet. He studied the art with his father in Fleurier, but in 1814 left home for political reasons with two of his brothers, Alphonse and Frédéric, to study watch making in London. After studying in the city for a few years with the firm of Messrs. Ilbery & Magniac, Magniac sent Bovet to Canton, China in 1818. Almost as soon as he arrived he was able to sell four of his watches for the equivalent of US$1 million in 2008 currency.

=== The 19th century: Founding of the company and China ===
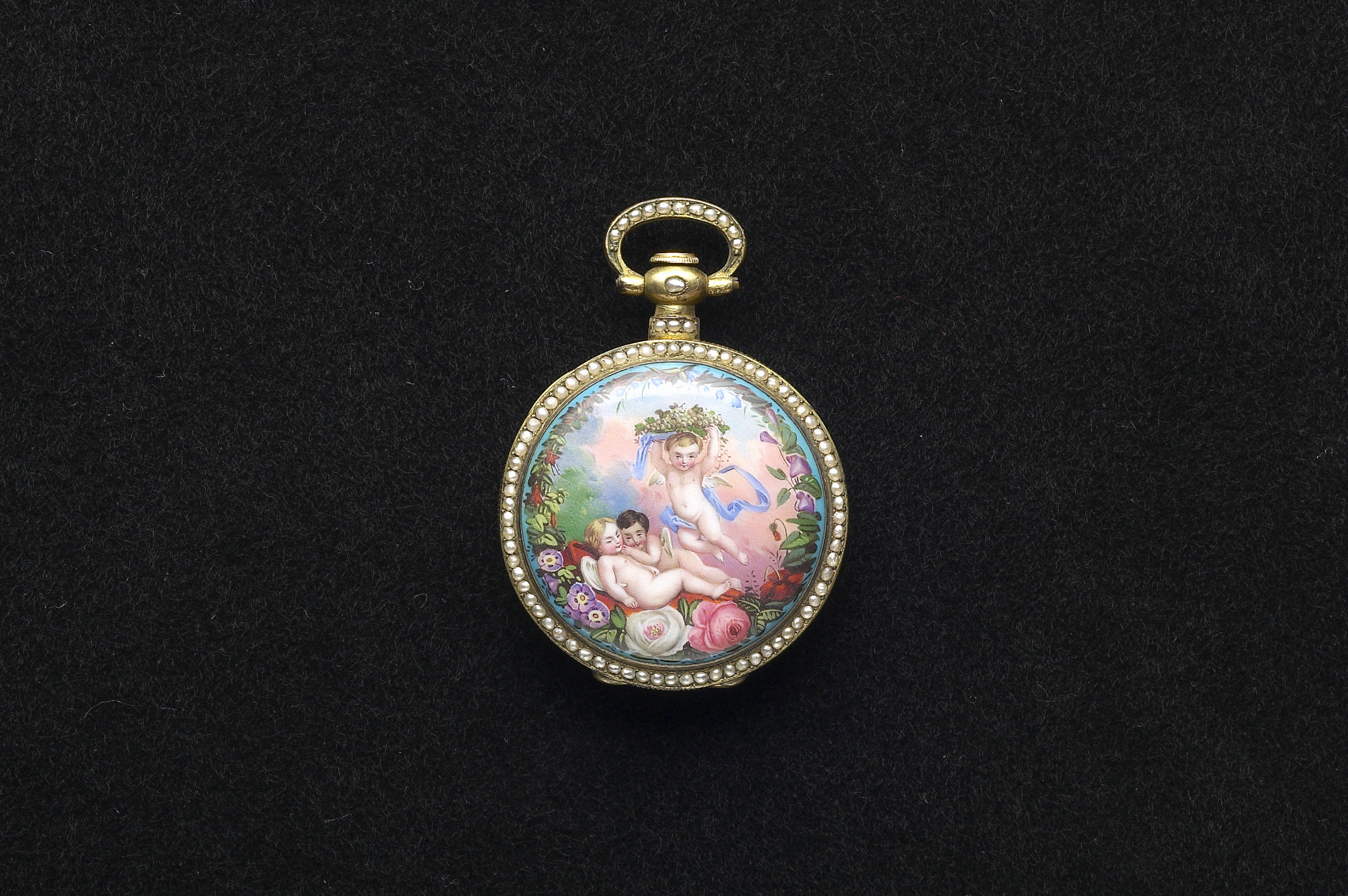
Bovet pocket watch with pearls and painted enamel, probably designed exclusively for the Chinese market. National Palace Museum

The original Bovet company was founded in London in 1822 by Édouard Bovet for the purposes of manufacturing watches exclusively for the Chinese market. Some watch historians believe that the company was established in London due to the ease of shipping watches to China on the frequent ships of the East India Company. Édouard's brothers, Alphonse and Frédéric, stayed in London to manage shipping; another brother, Charles-Henri, managed manufacturing in Fleurier, while Édouard developed the market in Canton.

Bovet was neither the first nor the last company to target the Chinese watch market. They shared it with Ilbery, Jaques Ullmann, and Vacheron Constantin, among others. Édouard Bovet discovered the potential of the Chinese market as a student of Ilbery in London, from whom he borrowed some design ideas. While from 1820 onwards Vacheron Constantin dominated the market in imperial northern China, Bovet remained market leader in the more populous south of the country. Although the 19th-century Chinese watch market was predated by a few Jesuit watch makers as early as the 15th century, by the early 19th century watch making in China had become of such a low quality that the new European watches were quickly appreciated.

The Bovet Chinese logo/trademark, pronounced bo wei.

Notwithstanding their high price, the popularity of Bovet watches in China meant that the company had to contract with other Swiss manufacturers such as Guinand to help them meet demand. Even though Juvet Fleurier also sold pieces in China, it was not uncommon to see Bovet pieces with a Juvet movement. In the 1830s Bovet established a manufacturing facility in Canton, but because of restrictions resulting from the Opium Wars, they had to close that facility and open a smaller one in Macau. It was about this time that the company created a Chinese name to more effectively market to the middle class. The Chinese name for Bovet, "Bo Wei", became a common noun for watches in China for many years.

The Chinese watch market collapsed around 1855 due to competition from France and the United States along with the tremendous number of Chinese-made counterfeits. By 1864 problems caused by the Opium War caused the Bovet family to sell their interest in the company. They sold the company to their manufacturing inspectors in Fleurier, Jules Jequier and Ernest Bobillier, who were soon joined by Ami Leuba.

As of 2013, watches made for the Chinese market by this manufacturer and others such as William Ilbery of London command high prices as collectable art objects.

=== Into the 20th century: Beyond China ===
After the virtual closure of the Chinese market, Bovet continued to manufacture pocket watches, though at a much reduced rate, and would frequently offer its manufacturing services on a contract basis to other watch companies. The Landry Frères purchased Bovet in 1888 but did not invest in it. In 1901, the Bovet trademark was sold at auction in Paris to Cesar and Charles Leuba, sons of Ami Leuba. Jacques Ullmann and Co., another successful produce of watches for the Chinese market, purchased the Bovet brand in 1918. After Jacques Ullmann went out of business in 1932, the Bovet name was acquired by Albert and Jean Bovet, who were successful watch makers and registered several patents for chronographs, such as the mono rattrapante: a device that would pause the second hand for a reading while the mechanism continued to run. The company Favre-Leuba purchased the name and manufacturing facilities from the Bovet brothers in 1948.

Favre-Leuba stopped producing Bovet branded watches in 1950, and then only manufactured its own branded watches from the facilities it acquired from the Bovet brothers. Favre-Leuba sold the Bovet brand and facilities in 1966 to a cooperative of individual watch makers.

=== The modern company ===
In 1989, Michel Parmigiani, purchased Bovet and registered the trademark for "all watchmaking products, mechanical watches and clocks and naval instruments, of Swiss origin", but no Bovet branded timepieces were produced. Parmigiani sold Bovet in 1990 to investors, and Bovet Fleurier SA was established. However, no watches were actually manufactured by the company until after it was acquired by Roger Guye and Thierry Oulevay in 1994, who opened a branch office in Geneva.

The company was acquired by Pascal Raffy, its current president, on 6 February 2001. In June 2006, Raffy purchased several manufacturing structures, such as the STT group, which produced complicated watch movements, in order to obtain complete control over the quality of all phases of the watch crafting process. STT was renamed Dimier 1738 Manufacture de Haute Horlogerie Artisanale and went into a full restructuring over the next two years in order to bring the standards up to those of Bovet. The second purchase was a dial and precious gem setting manufacture located in Plan-les-Ouates in Geneva. The name was changed also from Valor, Lopez et Villa to Dimier 1738 Manufacture Artisanale de Cadrans et de Sertissages. With the same philosophy as the movement factory, Raffy turned this factory into an artisan center providing dials for Bovet, Dimier's watch brand, and a select group of clients in luxury watchmaking. There are currently about 150 employees of Bovet Fleurier SA and the Dimier manufactures, and the company only produces 800 watches a year. Some modern Bovet watches are fitted with mechanisms manufactured by Vaucher Manufacture, a company that also supplied watches to the Chinese market in the 19th century. Bovet spends very little to advertise and prefers to have private salons for clients instead of attending public fairs. About a third of the watches it manufactures are one-of-a-kind pieces that are made to order.

Bovet has manufactured dashboard clocks for Rolls-Royce cars including the Rolls-Royce Boat Tail.

== Watches ==
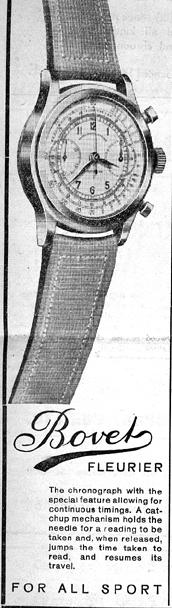
An advertisement for a Bovet Frerers chronograph from 1944 describing the mono rattrapante. Notice the difference in the logo from the Favre-Leuba Bovet.

=== Legacy of the Bovet style ===
Bovet watches include much artistic detail, and the company gives the artisans a great deal of independence in creating the elements of the watches, thus encouraging creativity. The Chinese watches were originally sold in pairs in a mahogany box, both for good luck and so that the user would have a back-up watch if one needed repair, as repairs would sometimes take more than six months to complete. The design characteristics of the watch emphasized the elements which appealed to Chinese consumers.

One of these appealing characteristics was the mechanics of clocks and watches, and so Bovet emphasized the beauty of the movements with its skeletonized views and highly decorative movements, the first watches to emphasize these characteristics in this way. For the same reason the watches were also among the first to include a second-hand. The enamel decorations were usually of European scenes or plant life, which made the watches more appealing to the Chinese consumers, since such images were as exotic to them as the European-made watches themselves.

The original Chinese Bovet watches often fetch more than US$300,000 for the most decorative models, and more than $50,000 for the simpler ones. The simplest metal Chinese watches in moderate condition are usually sold for at least $500. Replicas have become increasingly common on the Internet, and while some are the counterfeits produced in China in the 19th century, some more modern counterfeits have also been seen, particularly in markets in Europe and on eBay.

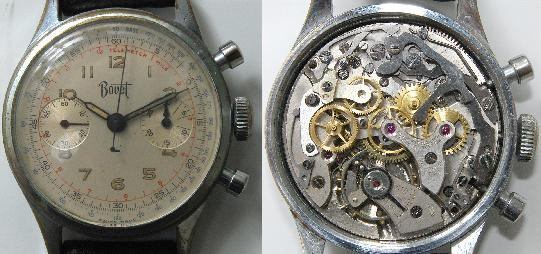
A Favre-Leuba Bovet chronograph, probably manufactured in 1949, with the 17 jewel Landeron calibre 51 movement.

=== The chronographs ===
The Bovet branded watches sold by Bovet Frères in the early 1940s (and possibly as early as the 1930s) and by Favre-Leuba from 1948 to 1950 contained a number of ebauches, or blank movements manufactured by other companies. Initially the signature, or logo, on the dial of the Bovet Frères watches simply had the name of the company in a typical typeface, but in the early 1940s their watches had their stylized logo without the "Frères". When Favre-Leuba purchased the company, the stylized logo was replaced with simply "Bovet" in normal type, then with a stylized "Bovet". In the transition just before the Favre-Leuba watches no longer used the Bovet brand, watches assembled at the Bovet facility bore the name of both Favre-Leuba and Bovet.

The most commonly used ebauches during this period were those manufactured by Ebauches SA (now ETA SA), namely the Valjoux and Landeron calibres. The 17 jewel Valjoux 84 lever movement with stem wind was the most common Valjoux movement for the Bovet chronographs, but sometimes the 77 calibre was also used. The Landeron movements were more varied, which included the 47, 48, 51, 57, 59, 80, 81 calibres, and for the rare date and moonphase models, the Landeron 186 was used. Most of the Bovet Frères watches contained Valjoux movements, while most of the Favre-Leuba watches contained Landeron movements. It has been said that the Valjoux were the better produced of the ebauches, indeed the best at the time, and that over time the Landeron became more common and cheap in quality, and it is said that the poor quality of the Landeron had a negative impact on the Bovet name. These chronographs were produced in large numbers, and are fairly commonly found on the internet for purchase. This was a commercial divergence in the Bovet identity which is unique in the Bovet history, as it is normally known for refined artistic pieces, and not utility.

=== The restoration of the Bovet style ===
When the company began to make watches again in the 1990s it produced a unique style of watch which incorporated various elements of the pocket watch form in its construction, such as at the lugs, and won awards after its introduction in 1997. Most Bovet watches use this trademark style today. The watches are unique for their high-quality enameling (such as the Fleurier Miniature Painting models), engraving, and a seven-day self-winding tourbillon. Bovet watches are also unique for the company's tradition of employing women artisans, which is rare for traditional watch making companies in Europe. Some of the limited edition modern Bovet watches can cost more than US$1 million, and the purchaser of such a watch is usually flown out to the manufacturing facility in Switzerland by the company to witness the production process and meet the artisans.

== See also ==
- List of watch manufactures
