= Purnell (company) =

Swiss watch company

- Company type: Private
- Industry: Watchmaking
- Founded: 2017
- Headquarters: Geneva
- Website: https://purnellwatches.com/

Purnell is a Swiss watch manufacturer. The company was founded in 2017 and was headquartered on Rue du Rhône 80 in Geneva, Switzerland. In 2024, Purnell declared bankruptcy.

== History ==
The company was founded in 2017, and produces manually wound tourbillon watches. Their movements are designed by watchmaker Eric Coudray, who also invented their "spherion" systems, a high-velocity triple-axis tourbillon. The company is known for creating Escape II, a watch with two triple-axis tourbillon systems.

In 2021, Purnell partnered with France Football to create a pair of watches which were awarded to winners of the Ballon d’Or. In 2022, they became the official timekeeper of AS Monaco. In March 2022, it partnered with READYMADE to make a set of watches with straps made of recycled fabric from WWII US military surplus. Purnell has also partnered with Italian footballer Fabio Cannavaro.
