= Greubel Forsey =

Swiss watchmaking company

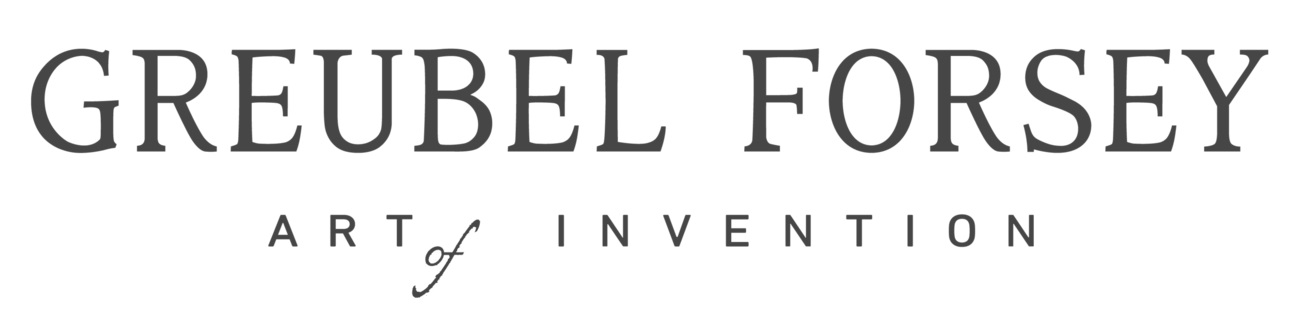
- Company type: Private company
- Industry: Watchmaking
- Founded: 2004
- Founder: Robert Greubel; Stephen Forsey
- Headquarters: La Chaux-de-Fonds, Switzerland
- Area served: Worldwide
- Key people: Michel Nydegger, CEO
- Products: Luxury timepieces
- Website: www.greubelforsey.com

Greubel Forsey is a Swiss watchmaking company specializing in complicated, high-end timepieces. It was launched in 2004 by Robert Greubel and Stephen Forsey and is based in La Chaux-de-Fonds, Switzerland.

Greubel Forsey makes timepieces with multiple tourbillons and inclined balance wheels with the aim of improving timekeeping precision.

== Founders ==
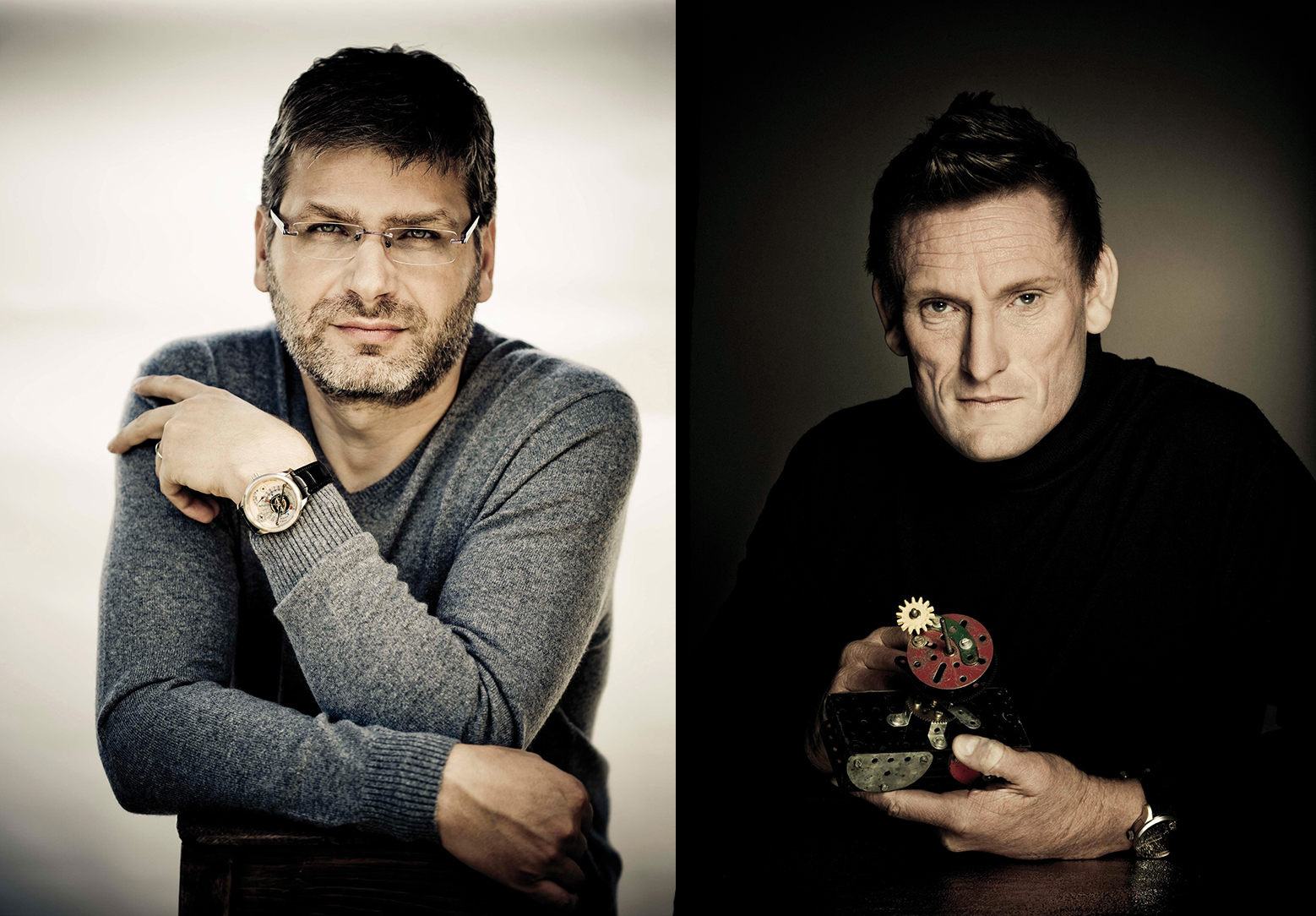
Robert Greubel (left) and Stephen Forsey

Robert Greubel grew up in Alsace, France and began his horological career by working with his watchmaker father in the family shop, Greubel Horlogerie. In 1987 Greubel moved to Switzerland to join the International Watch Company (IWC), where he helped develop their Grand Complication. In 1990 he joined Renaud & Papi SA (now Audemars Piguet Renaud & Papi SA) as a prototypist for complicated movements and rose to become managing director and partner.

Stephen Forsey grew up in St Albans, England, where he was inspired by his father's passion for mechanics and engineering. From 1987 to 1992 Forsey specialized in antique clock restoration and became head of Watch Restoration at Asprey’s in London. From 1988 to 1990 Forsey attended two five-month courses at the WOSTEP watchmaking school in Neuchâtel and in 1992 joined Robert Greubel's team at Renaud & Papi SA (now Audemars Piguet Renaud & Papi SA), developing complicated watch movements.

In 1999 both Greubel and Forsey began working independently, and in 2001 they founded together Complitime SA, a company specializing in creating mechanisms with complicated movements for up-market watch brands.

After many years in development, in 2004 at the BaselWorld international watch exhibition in Switzerland, Robert Greubel and Stephen Forsey launched their first watch, the Double Tourbillon 30° (DT30°), under their own brand ‘Greubel Forsey’.

== Corporate history ==
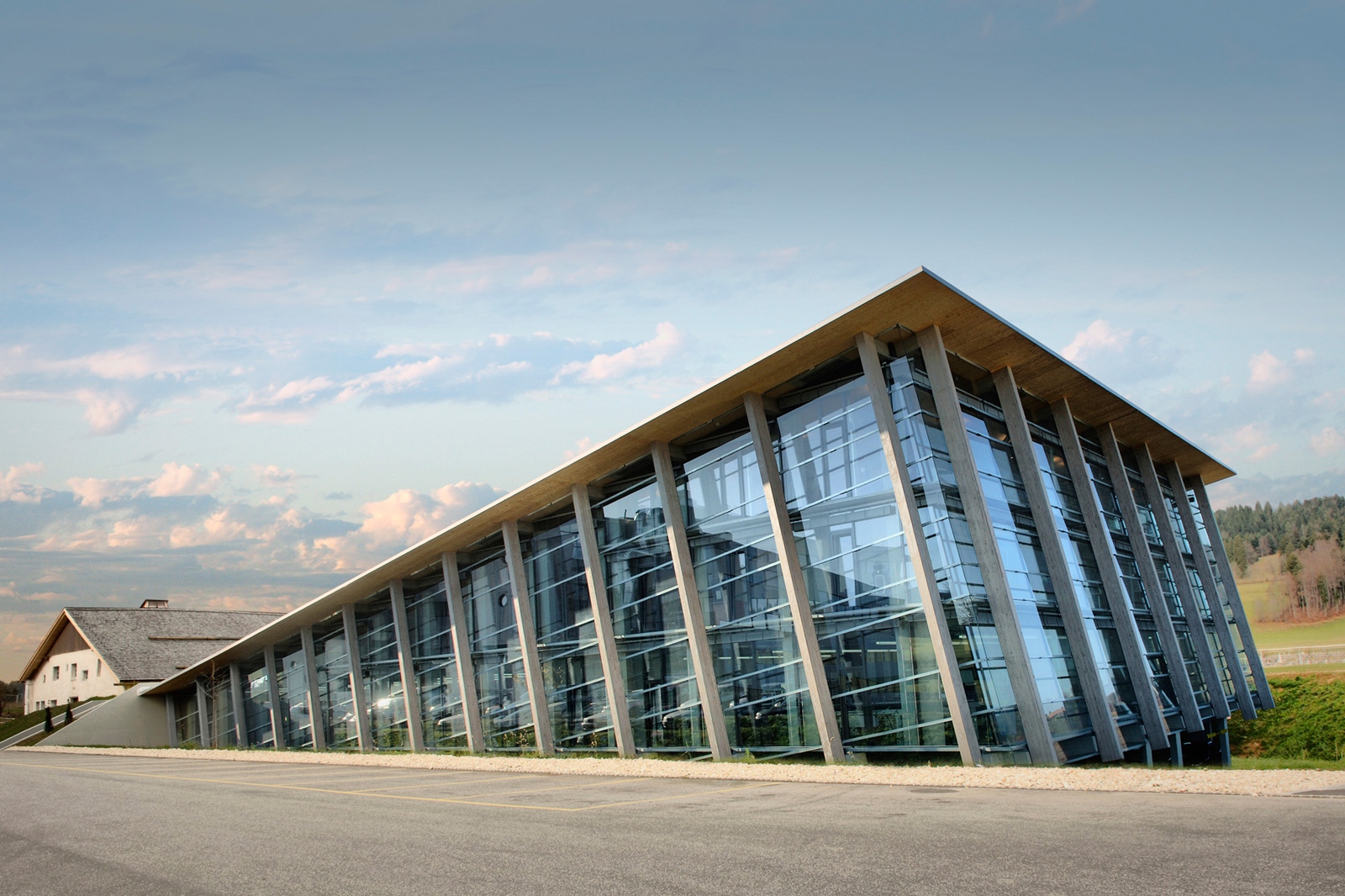
Greubel Forsey Manufacture

Robert Greubel and Stephen Forsey launched Greubel Forsey in 2004 at BaselWorld with the introduction of their Double Tourbillon 30° (DT30). Both men had been working together since 1992 at Renaud & Papi, where they developed complicated watch movements. In 1999 Greubel and Forsey began working independently, and in 2001 they founded Complitime SA, a company specializing in creating complicated movements for high end Swiss watch brands. They launched Greubel Forsey at Baselworld 2004 with the Double Tourbillon 30° watch.

In 2006 the company collaborated with American jeweller Harry Winston to make the Opus 6 model.

Also in 2006 the Richemont group acquired minority stake in Greubel Forsey’s share capital.

Greubel Forsey has invented and presented a number of tourbillon-regulated watches including: the Double Tourbillon 30° (DT30°), the Quadruple Tourbillon à Différentiel, the Tourbillon 24 Secondes Incliné and the GMT. At the 2012 SIHH Greubel Forsey presented their first non-tourbillon model, the Double Balancier 35°.

Greubel Forsey specializes in designing and manufacturing high-end watches that are usually, but not exclusively, based on the Tourbillon escapement, and is reputed for their high level of hand finishing. The company makes approximately 100 watches per year.

== Notable models ==
=== Hand Made 1 ===
While the vast majority of modern wristwatches are made using large scale industrial techniques and machinery, 95% of Greubel Forsey's Hand Made 1 – including the hairspring – is made using only hand-operated tools. Each watch takes approximately 6,000 hours (around three years of person hours) to make. Hand Made 1 was awarded the prize for best Men’s Complication Watch at the 2020 Grand Prix d'Horlogerie de Genève.

=== GMT/GMT Sport ===
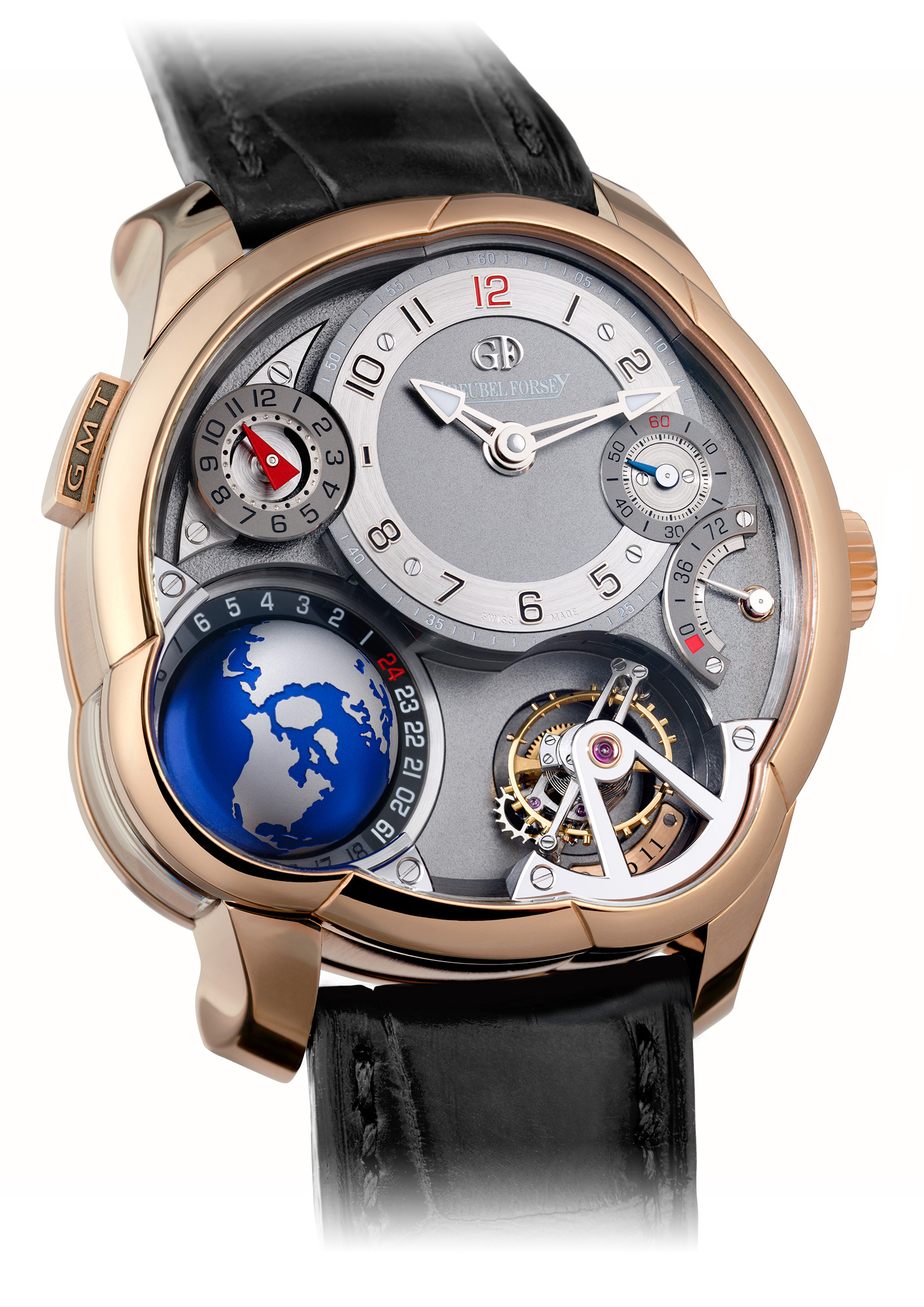
GMT in red gold

Presented in 2011, the GMT is the first Greubel Forsey timepiece to feature a complication other than a tourbillon. It displays a second time zone at 10 o’clock and the world by a rotating, three-dimensional globe at 8 o’clock. The position of the continents on the titanium globe are cross-referenced with the 24-hour chapter ring circling it for an approximate indication of time all over the world. Other indications include an hour-minute dial at 1 o’clock, a small seconds dial on top of that at 3 o’clock and at 4 o’clock a sectorial power reserve indicator. The movement was especially developed for this timepiece and features the 25° inclined Tourbillon 24 Secondes cage. Since it was first launched, the GMT has been released in rose gold, white gold, and in platinum.

=== QP à Équation ===
The QP à Équation is a perpetual calendar displaying day, date, month, calendar year, leap year, day/night, equation of time with month, season, solstice and equinox, hours, minutes, small seconds and power-reserve. It has a function selector and regulated by a 24-second tourbillon.

=== Quadruple Tourbillon ===
The Quadruple Tourbillon uses two double-tourbillons (four tourbillon cages in total) working independently to average out and minimize gravitationally induced errors on the balance. A spherical differential connects the four rotating carriages, distributing torque between two wheels rotating at different speeds.

=== Grande Sonnerie ===
The Petite and Grande Sonnerie is a striking watch featuring a minute repeater activated by a crown pusher and a grande and petite sonnerie. As well as chiming the time, it displays hours, minutes, small seconds, a movement power reserve indicator and a striking power reserve indicator. It is regulated by a 24-second tourbillon. With its 935 components, the Grande Sonnerie is Greubel Forsey’s most complex watch to date, requiring 11 years of research and development.

=== Signature 1 ===
The Signature line of watches are developed by one watchmaker who creates their timepiece with the aid, and to the quality standards, of Greubel Forsey.

=== Signature 1 ===
Signature 1 is by Greubel Forsey watchmaker Didier J. G. Cretin. It displays hours, minutes and small seconds, and features a proprietary Greubel Forsey regulator.

=== Invention Pieces ===
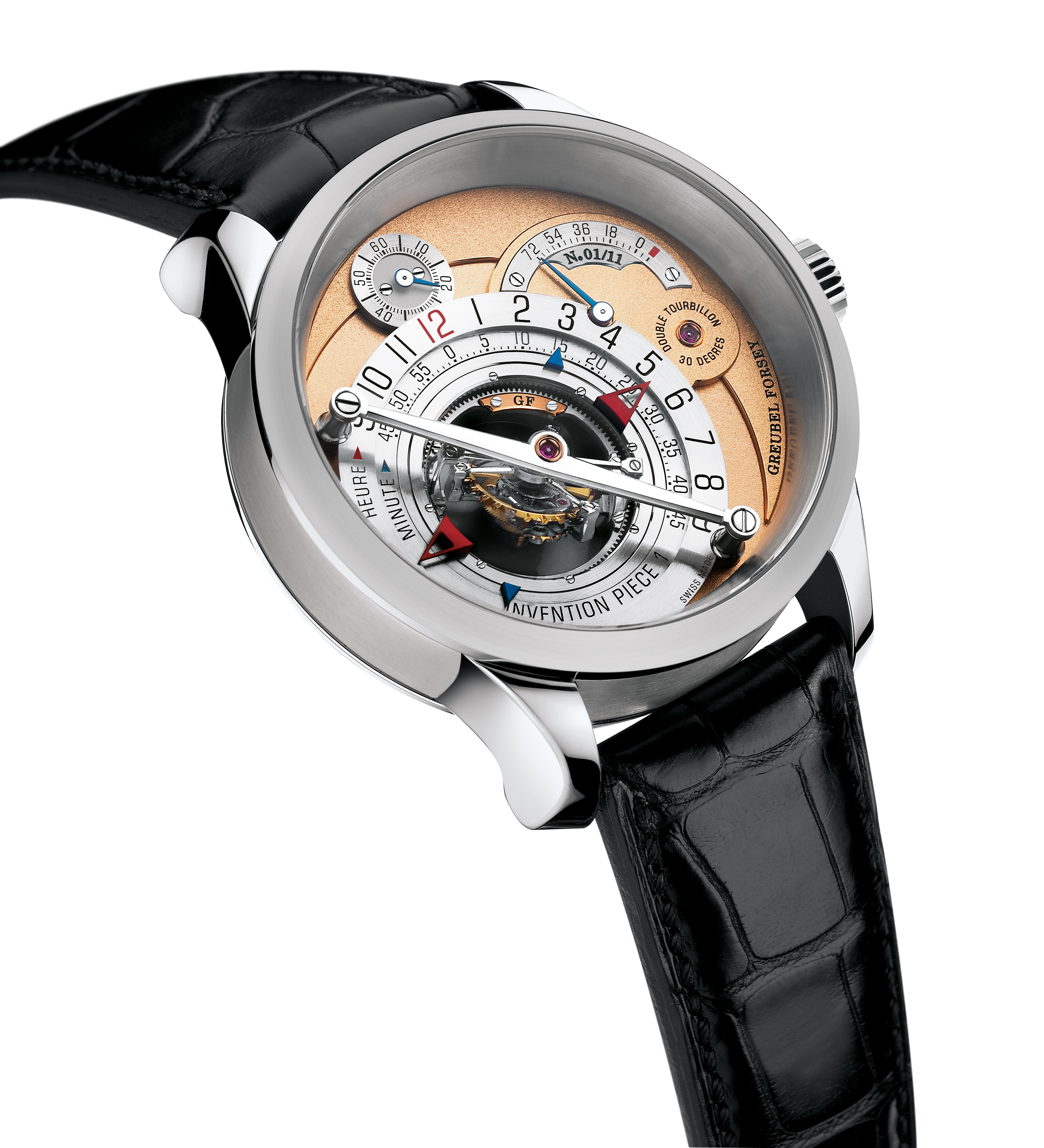
Invention Piece 1

Invention Pieces showcase the important invention/mechanism in the movement rather than simply indicating the time.

==== Invention Piece 1 (IP1) 2007 ====
Invention Piece 1 features the Double Tourbillon 30° mechanism with a new movement architecture. Red and blue triangles indicate the time under a large polished tourbillon bridge, with a small seconds dial and a ‘power reserve indicator’ above.

==== Invention Piece 2 (IP2) 2011 ====
The Quadruple Tourbillon mechanism is at the heart of Invention Piece 2. The two double tourbillon systems are configured head-to-tail and are coupled by a spherical differential. A sub-dial at 5 o’clock features a red triangle indicating hours while a concentrically-configured rotating disc indicates minutes. Small seconds are at 10 o'clock and there is a power reserve indicator at 11 o'clock.

==== Invention Piece 3 (IP3) 2009 ====
The Tourbillon 24 Secondes is the mechanism highlighted by Invention Piece 3. A large 24-hour sub-dial dominates the dial side, with hours indicated by a red triangle. A smaller blue triangle indicates minutes. Small seconds are at 5 o’clock. Opposite the tourbillon at 8 o’clock lies a power reserve at 2 o’clock. Four gold dial plates on the dial are engraved with a message in French from Robert Greubel and Stephen Forsey.

=== Double Tourbillon 30° ===
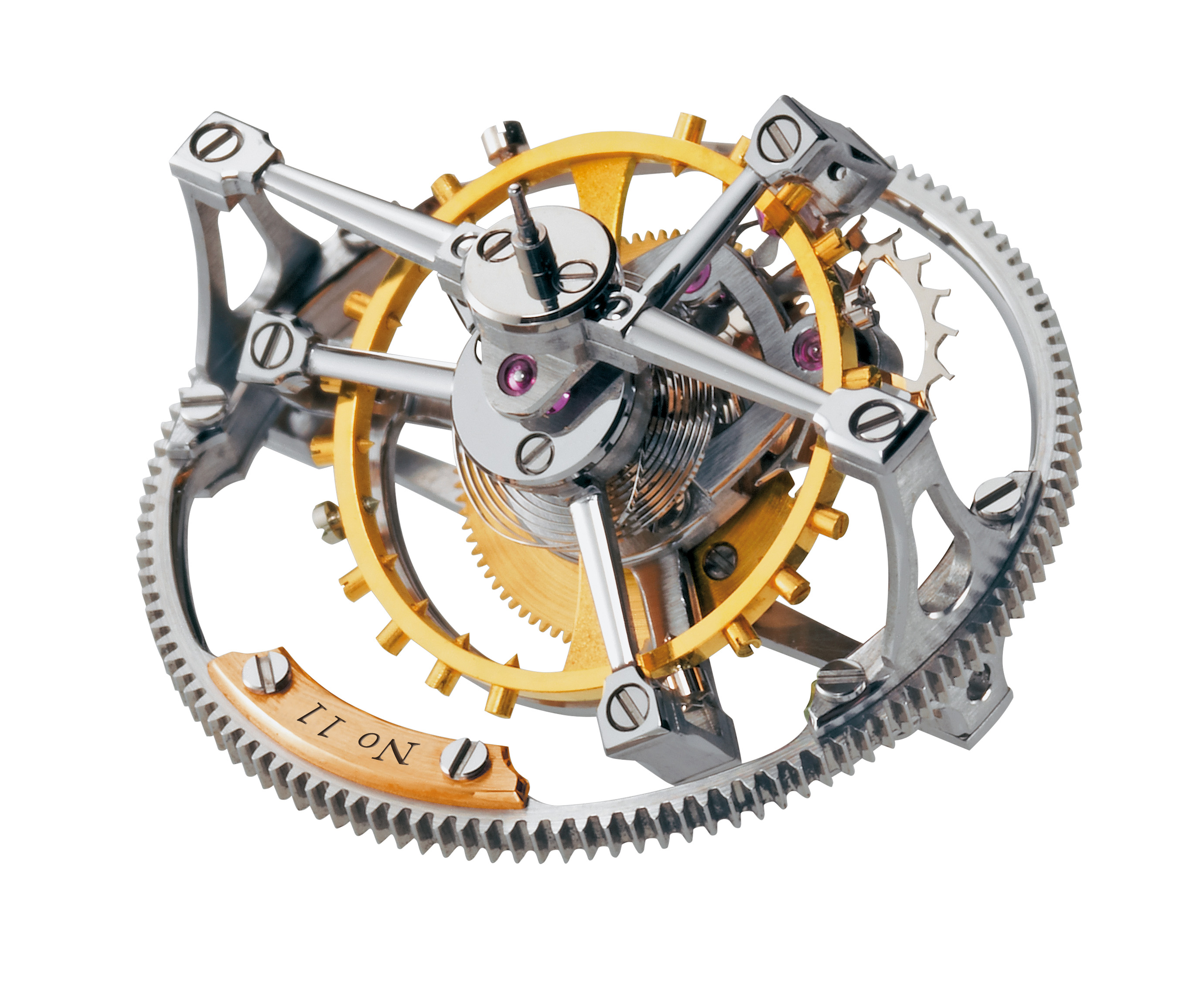
Double Tourbillon 30° mechanism

The Double Tourbillon 30° (DT30°) Vision/Secret The DT30° was presented in 2004 and features one 30° inclined tourbillon cage rotating once per minute inside another tourbillon cage rotating in four minutes, with the aim of averaging out and minimizing gravitationally induced errors on the balance.

=== Double Tourbillon 30° Technique ===
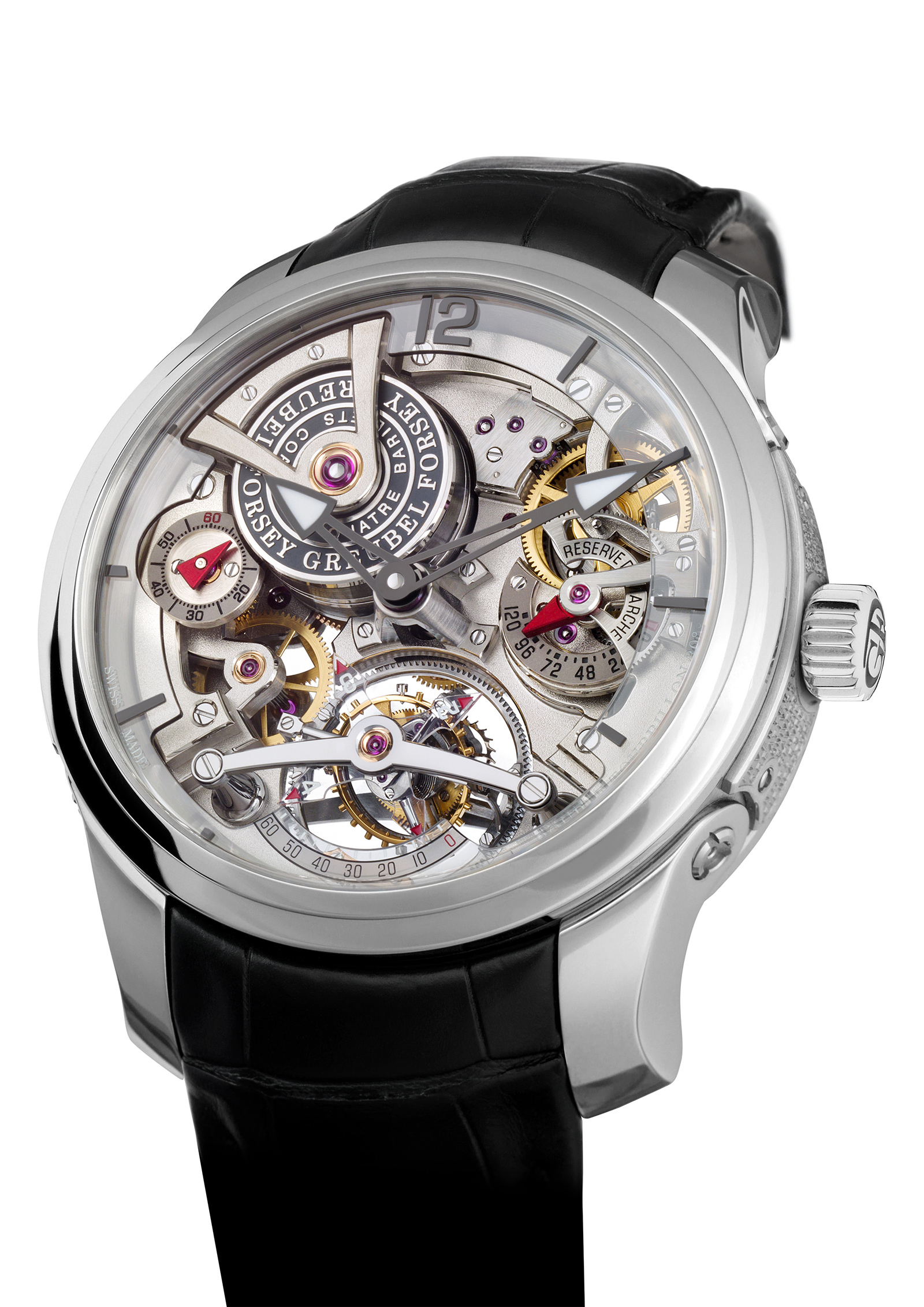
Double Tourbillon Technique

The Double Tourbillon 30° Technique is designed to highlight Greubel Forsey first invention, the double tourbillon 30° by highlighting the regulator.

=== Art Pieces ===
Art Pieces highlight the convergence of watchmaking and art, with the emphasis on the art rather than displaying the time. Art Piece 1 is a collaboration between Greubel Forsey and British micro-sculptor Willard Wigan. Art Piece 1 features integrated magnifying optics on the side of the case to enable the Willard Wigan micro-sculpture to be viewed.

== Notable inventions ==
In 2005, Greubel Forsey launched a proprietary development methodology called EWT (Experimental Watch Technology) to experiment, test and ratify their projects in-house. EWT is research and development platform incorporating its own laboratory. Inventions in EWT include:

Binomial, a mono-material balance-and-spring wheel combination mechanism using isochronically stable materials.

The Différentiel d’Égalité, a constant force device based in a spherical differential. This differential keeps providing the same constant force to all the four tourbillons, solving the typical problem where the main spring gives different amount of force depending on how much potential energy it retains.

Mechanical Nano, using micro-scale components to make new display systems and to significantly increase the performance of mechanical watches.

== Time Æon Foundation ==
Robert Greubel and Stephen Forsey are founding members of the Time Æon Foundation. The foundations goals are to:

- Index and catalogue endangered crafts.
- Preserve the crafts associated with watchmaking excellence and help pass them on to new generations.
- Help protect the world’s watchmaking heritage.
- Inspire people to take up watchmaking as a profession.
- Support the training of future independent watchmakers wishing to promote watchmaking excellence.

In support of its aims, the Time Æon Foundation supports projects including Naissance d’une Montre (1, 2 and 3) and Oscillon.

== Prizes and awards ==
Greubel Forsey won the Gaïa Prize in 2009 for 'Entrepreneurship'; the Grand Prix de l’Aiguille d’Or at the Grand Prix de l’Horlogerie de Genève in 2010 for the Double Tourbillon 30° Édition Historique in 5N red gold; and the International Chronometry Competition in 2011 for the Double Tourbillon 30 Technique; in 2015 at the 15th Grand Prix d'Horlogerie de Genève, Greubel Forsey won the "Aiguille d'Or" for the Tourbillon 24 Secondes Vision in white gold.

A Greubel Forsey Double Tourbillon 30° Technique won the 2011 International Chronometry Competition held by the Le Locle Museum of Horology.

Hand Made 1 was awarded the prize for best Men’s Complication Watch at the 2020 Grand Prix d'Horlogerie de Genève.

Other awards include: Invention Piece 1 awarded the 2007 Revolution magazine prize for 'Grand Complication Watch'; Montres Passion magazine awarded the 2007 'Special Jury Prize – Watch of the Year' for the Tourbillon 24 Secondes.

Revolution magazine awarded the Quadruple Tourbillon the 2008 prize for best 'Technical Achievement' and in 2009 it also won the prize for best 'Complication Watch' from the Grand Prix d’Horlogerie Asia. The Double Tourbillon 30° Technique received the 2009 'Grand Complication Watch' prize at the Grand Prix d’Horlogerie de Genève.

Invention Piece 2 was awarded the 2011 prize for “Limited Edition Watch of the Year” at the World Watch Awards in India and at the same ceremony, Stephen Forsey received an award for his “Contribution to Haute Horlogerie”.
