= Nicholas Foulkes =

English historian, author, and journalist (born 1964)

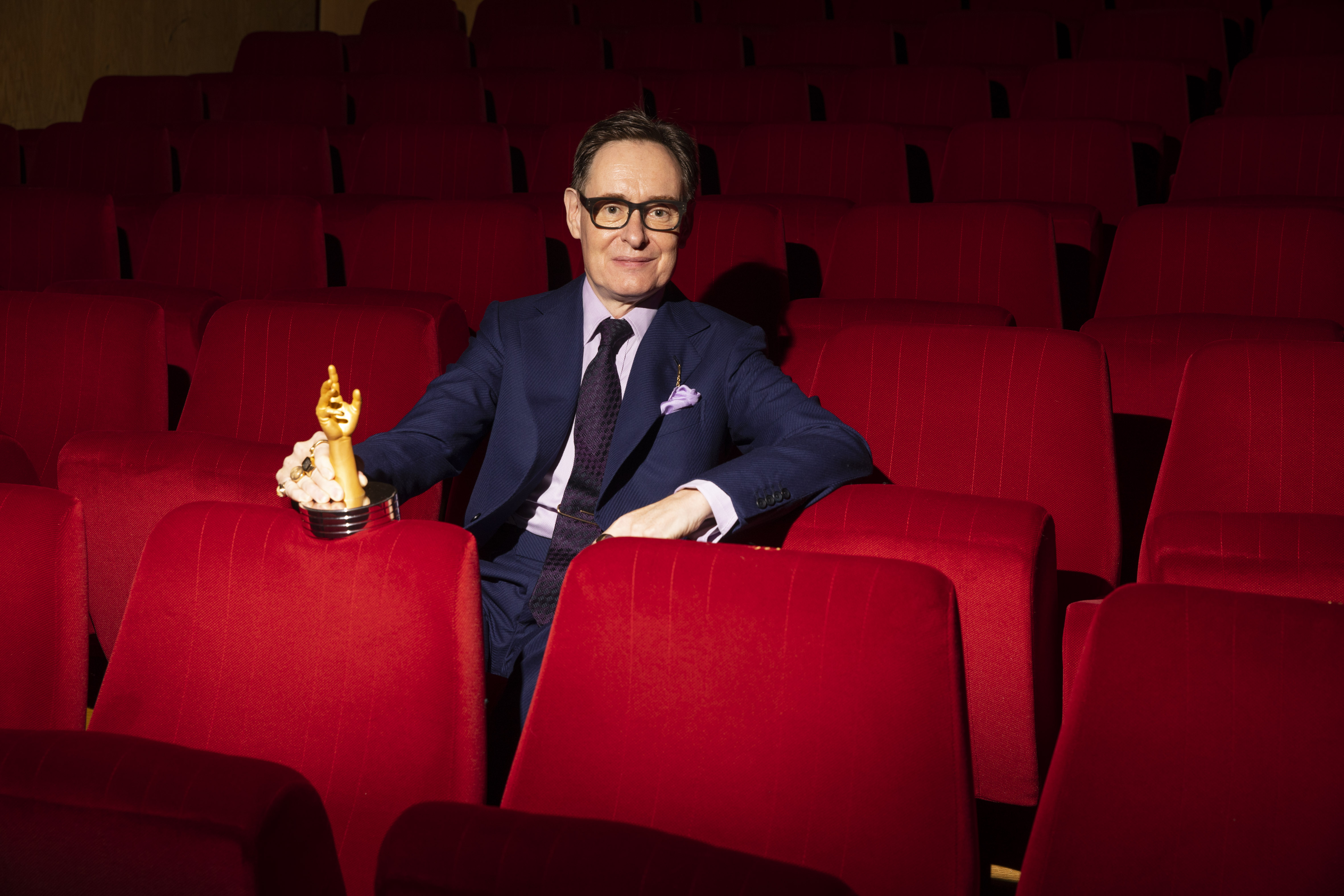
- Foulkes in 2023
- Born: Nicholas Barrie Anton Foulkes; United Kingdom
- Education: Hertford College, Oxford
- Occupations: Historian; author; journalist

President of the Jury for the Grand Prix d'Horlogerie de Genève
- Incumbent
- Assumed office 2021
- Website: nicholasfoulkes.com

Nicholas Barrie Anton Foulkes (born 1964) is a British historian, author and journalist. He has written extensively about 19th-century social history as well as the history of luxury goods. He specializes in horology and Cuban cigars. Robb Report included his book, The Impossible Collection of Watches, in a list of "5 Books Every Watch Collector Should Own," and his book, Swans – Legends of the Jet Society, was optioned for production as a TV series.

== Education ==
Foulkes attended Christ's Hospital and Hertford College, Oxford at the University of Oxford, where he graduated in 1983.

== Honours ==
In 2007, Foulkes was named Havana Man of the Year (Habano Hombre del Año) in the Communications category.

In 2021, Foulkes was named president of the jury for the Grand Prix d'Horlogerie de Genève, intended to highlight and annually reward the excellence of the watchmaking art.

== Personal life ==
Foulkes is married to Alexandra Foulkes, with whom he has two sons. The family resides in London.

== Selected bibliography ==
- Joe Gilmore and His Cocktails (2003)
- Scandalous Society: Passion and Celebrity in the Nineteenth Century (2004)
- Dancing into Battle: A social history of the battle of Waterloo (2007)
- High Society: The History of America's Upper Class (2008)
- Gentlemen and Blackguards: Gambling mania and the plot to steal the Derby of 1844 (2011)
- Swans: Legends of the Jet Society (2013)
- The Impossible Collection of Watches (2014)
- Bernard Buffet: The Invention of the Modern Mega-Artist (2016)
- Patek Philippe: The Authorized Biography (2016)
- Cigars: A Guide (2017)
- Automata: A Brief History of the Automata from Ancient Times to the Fée Ondine (2017)
- Time Tamed: The Remarkable Story of Humanity's Quest to Measure Time (2019)
- Ira: The Life and Times of a Princess (2019)
- Jaeger LeCoultre: Reverso (2020)
