= Édouard Bovet =

Swiss watchmaker (1797–1849)

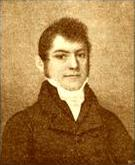
Édouard Bovet

Édouard Bovet (14 September 1797 – 25 October 1849) was a Swiss watchmaker and founder of the Bovet Fleurier watch company.

== Early life ==
Édouard Bovet was born in Fleurier in Neuchâtel, the son of Jean Frédéric Bovet, in 1797. Although the "Genève" tag is virtually compulsory for Swiss watches in the highest price bracket, it is the lesser-known name "Fleurier" name that marks Bovet watches. Bovet originated from this village in the Val-de-Travers, to the west of Neuchâtel. Watchmaking was introduced there between 1730 and 1740 by David Vaucher, probably a pupil of Daniel JeanRichard. The number of watchmakers in the Val-de-Travers grew rapidly in the first half of the 19th century. The lacemaking that had provided work for one-third of the people living in the valley had been replaced by the much lower cost production on Jacquard machines in France and Flanders.

Four more sons and a daughter were born in the following years. After completing his apprenticeship as a watchmaker, Edouard Bovet and two of his brothers moved to London, then the center of watch assembly and the watch trade in 1814.

== Career ==
=== 1818–1830 ===
He found a job with the Magniac company who sent him to Canton in 1818 as a watch repairer; this was the sole Chinese port that tolerated European merchants and businessmen — the so-called “red-haired barbarians”. In Canton in 1818, he formed a partnership with his brothers in 1822. The enterprise, which made luxury watches in Switzerland for export to China, was a resounding success.

The flourishing watch trade with China prompted Bovet to set up his own company in 1822: he founded a general partnership with his two brothers in London and one brother who had remained in Fleurier; the fourth and youngest brother also entered the business. Soon every first class watch in China with a high practical value and elegant exterior was simply called "Bovet". Pearl ornamentation and enamel miniature painting carried out in Geneva on Bovet watches ensured first class aesthetics at prices that, in contrast to the exaggerated luxury watches of the time, were affordable, at least for the upper class.

For years a Bovet watch was considered an asset in China and was accepted in payment everywhere. The movement was frequently finely engraved and chased and could be observed through a glass cover on the back. The central second hand that jumped every second, like modern quartz watches, was a Bovet specialty. Bovet adapted its production to the Chinese tradition of making gifts of valuable objects (statues, vases, horses even concubines) in pairs. So he could often sell two identical watches at the same time: if one failed, a replacement was at hand. But Bovet’s enamel painters found it very difficult to paint two identical but mirror-image miniatures.

=== Return to Fleurier ===
Edouard Bovet returned to Fleurier in 1830 as a made man, accompanied by his four-year-old half-Chinese son Edouard-Georges. At that time it was customary for the European merchants in China to take a "temporary" wife for the duration of their stay. If children were born of this liaison, the father accepted responsibility. As a fervent republican, Bovet exposed himself in the abortive Neuchâtel revolution against Prussian rule in 1831. The house that his brothers had built for him in Fleurier according to his written instructions from China remained empty. Bovet had to move to Besançon where he continued watchmaking with the help of other exiled watchmakers.

== Legacy ==
Edouard Bovet’s brothers and nephews — all of them company shareholders — made sure that the cornerstones of the Bovet empire in Fleurier, London and Canton continued to flourish. Once the political situation was back to normal, in 1840, the firm was reregistered as Bovet Frères et Cie.; the share capital amounted to one million francs. Edouard Bovet died in 1849; he lived long enough to witness the triumph of the republic and the withdrawal of the Prussians in the previous year. The succession was settled and the production for China continued; in 1855 Bovet was awarded a gold medal at the world exhibition in Paris for an absolutely identical pair of watches ordered by the Chinese emperor.

Two generations later the Bovets were running a flourishing Swiss-Chinese commercial enterprise and were no longer interested in watchmaking. The name was sold several times and relaunched in 1994. The current Bovet watches are modeled on their luxury precursors from the 19th century and look like pocket watches for the wrist.
