= Tourbillon =

Addition to the mechanics of a watch escapement

Tourbillon movement (high resolution)

In chronometry, a tourbillon (/tʊərbɪˈjɒn/; also tourbillion, /tʊərˈbɪljən/) (Note: From French tourbillon [[tuʁbijɔ̃]], 'whirlwind') (French for 'whirlwind') is an addition to the mechanics of a watch escapement to increase accuracy. Conceived by the British watchmaker and inventor John Arnold, it was developed by his friend, the Swiss-French watchmaker Abraham-Louis Breguet, and patented by Breguet on 26 June 1801. In a tourbillon the escapement and balance wheel are mounted in a rotating cage, with the goal of eliminating errors of poise in the balance giving a uniform weight.

Tourbillons are still included in some modern wristwatches, where the mechanism is usually exposed on the watch's face to showcase it. Historically, Breguet's tourbillon was conceived to counteract the adverse effects of gravity on a pocket watch's regulating system, particularly in vertical positions. Pocket watches were typically worn vertically in waistcoat pockets, which led to gravitational distortion of the hairspring. The tourbillon aimed to average out these positional errors by rotating the entire escapement and balance wheel through a full 360 degrees at regular intervals. While its chronometric advantage has long been debated, the tourbillon came to be regarded as a hallmark of horological mastery due to the extraordinary craftsmanship required to construct and regulate it.

The rarity of tourbillons persisted for nearly two centuries, with fewer than a thousand believed to have been made between 1801 and 1945. These were often crafted by highly skilled artisans for submission to observatory trials. Notable among early examples is the Girard-Perregaux Tourbillon with Three Gold Bridges, first conceptualized in 1884 and manufactured by Ernest Guinand—who also built movements for Patek Philippe. Other innovators, such as Albert Potter and Bahne Bonniksen (inventor of the karrusel, a related rotating escapement platform), further diversified the complication’s evolution.

The tourbillon's application in wristwatches did not begin until the mid-20th century. Early wristwatch tourbillons were made in very limited quantities, including pieces by Patek Philippe, Lip, and Omega. In 1986, Audemars Piguet revitalized interest in the tourbillon with the launch of Calibre 2870—the world's first automatic tourbillon wristwatch. With a titanium cage 7.2 mm wide and a total movement height of 2.5 mm, it marked a technical milestone and became a catalyst for the tourbillon’s modern resurgence.

== Types of tourbillon ==
=== Single axis tourbillon ===
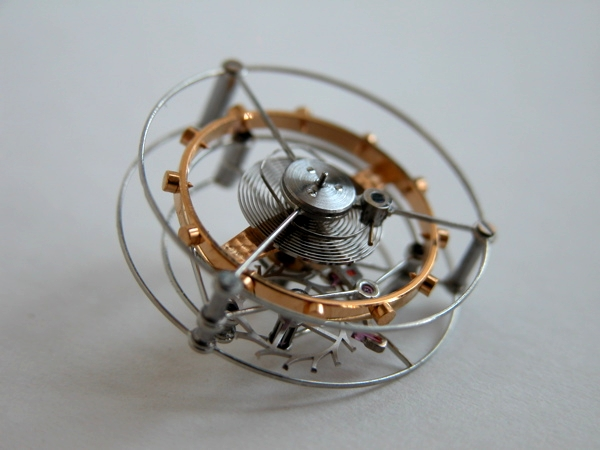
An assembled tourbillon

Patented by Breguet in 1801, the single axis tourbillon minimizes the difference in rate between positions caused by poise errors. The tourbillon was invented to complement the split bi-metallic balance which was inherently difficult to poise.

Video of a tourbillon in action

In the most common implementation of this, the tourbillon carriage is carried by the fourth pinion, within a stationary fourth wheel. The escape pinion is engaged with this stationary fourth wheel so when carriage is turned by the fourth pinion the escape wheel will also rotate. The carriage is released and locked with each vibration of the balance.

=== Double-axis tourbillon ===
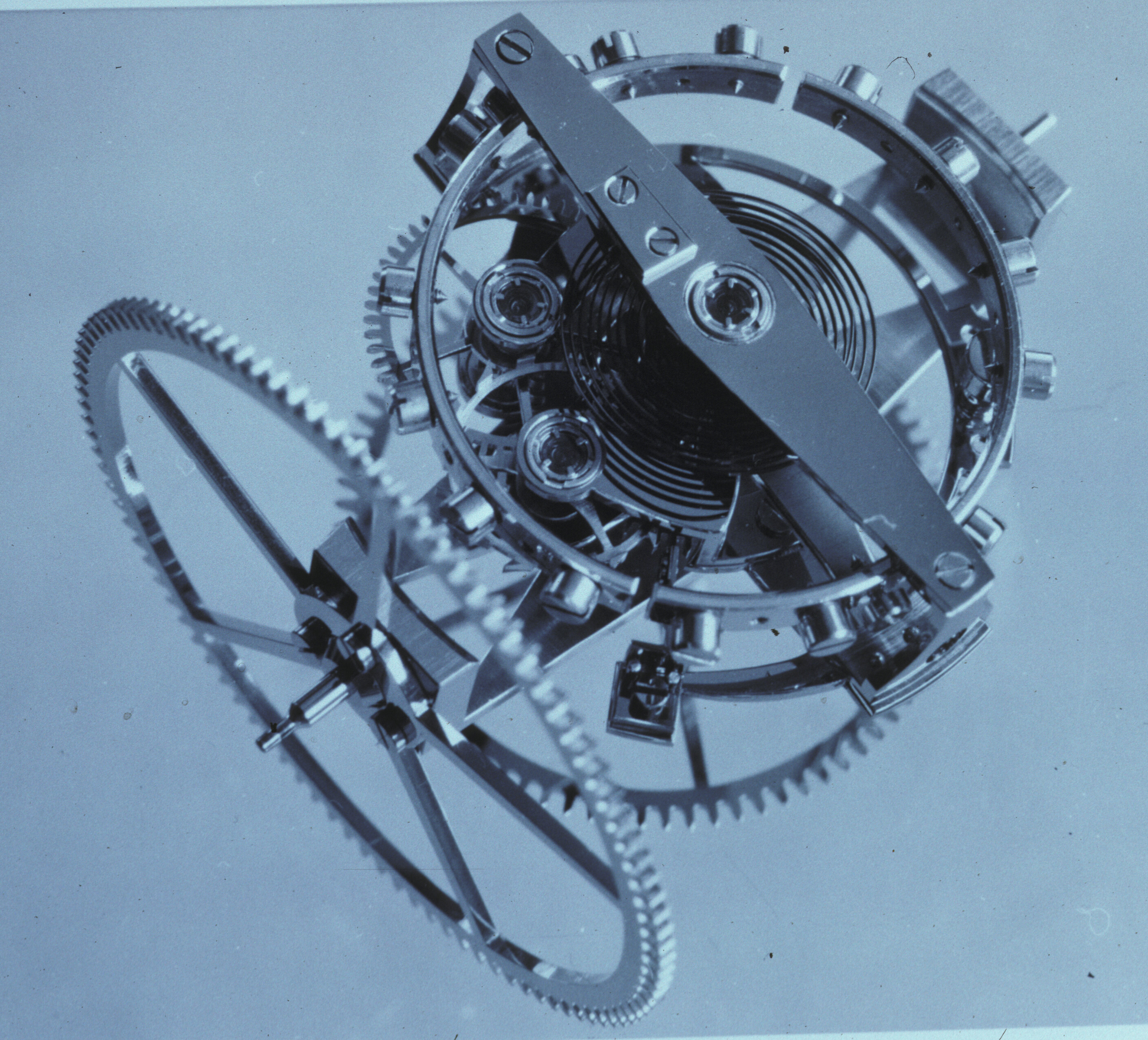
Anthony Randall's double axis tourbillon as installed in a carriage clock

Anthony Randall invented the double-axis tourbillon in January 1977 and subsequently patented it. The first working example was later constructed by Richard Good in 1978. In 1980, Anthony Randall made a double-axis tourbillon in a carriage clock, which was located in the (now closed) Time Museum in Rockford, Illinois, US, and was included in their Catalogue of Chronometers.

A characteristic of this tourbillon is that it turns around two axes, both of which rotate once per minute. The whole tourbillon is powered by a special constant-force mechanism, called a remontoire. Prescher invented the constant-force mechanism to equalize the effects of a wound and unwound mainspring, friction, and gravitation. Thereby even force is always supplied to the oscillation regulating system of the double-axis tourbillon. The device incorporates a modified system after a design by Henri Jeanneret.

=== Double and quadruple tourbillons ===
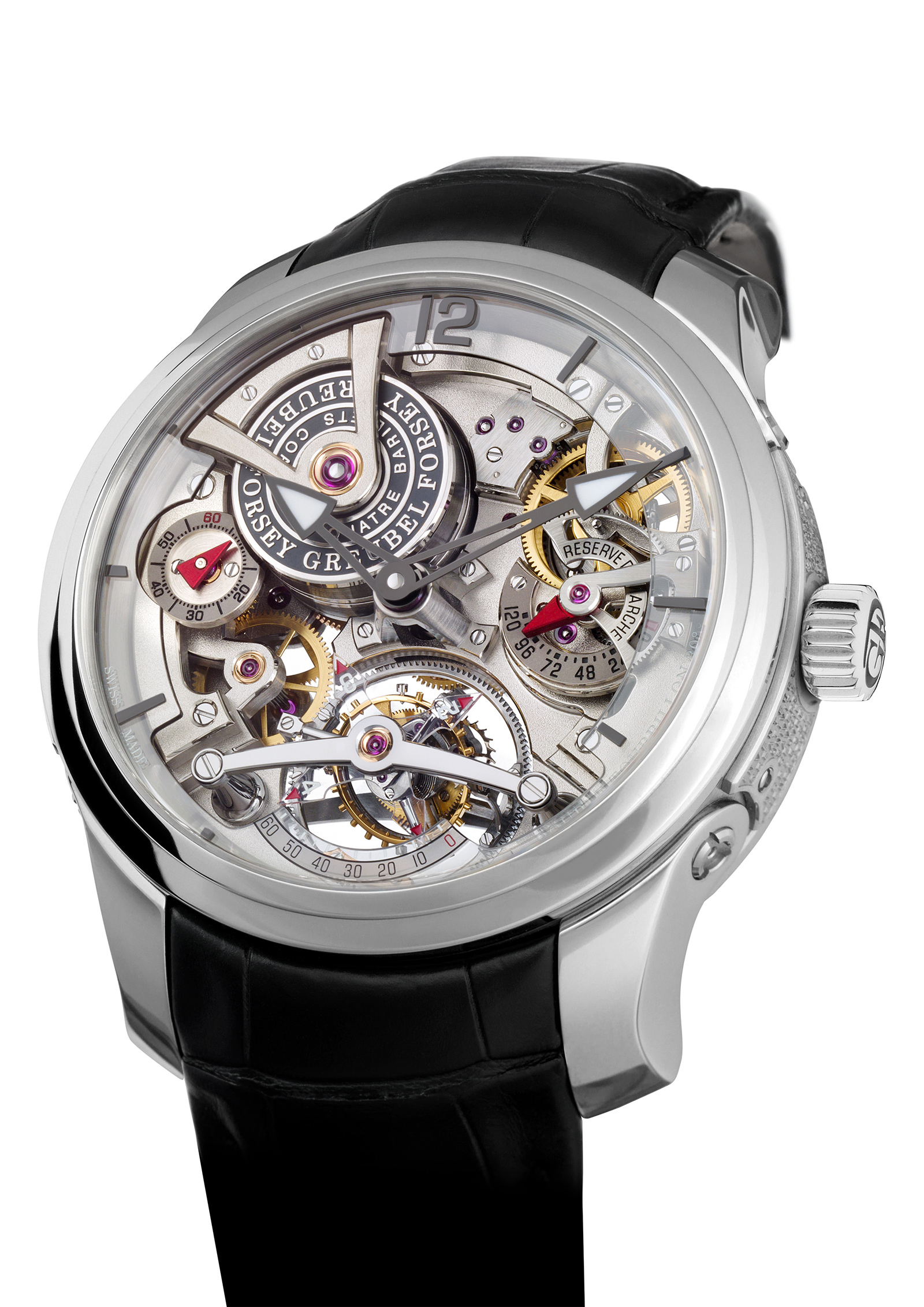
Greubel Forsey Double Tourbillon Technique, an example of which won the 2011 International Chronometry Competition held by the Horological Museum in Le Locle

Robert Greubel and Stephen Forsey launched the brand Greubel Forsey in 2004 with the introduction of their Double Tourbillon 30° (DT30). Both men had been working together since 1992 at Renaud & Papi, where they developed complicated watch movements. The Double Tourbillon 30° features one tourbillon carriage rotating once per minute and inclined at 30°, inside another carriage which rotates once every four minutes. In 2005, Greubel Forsey presented their Quadruple Tourbillon à Différentiel (QDT), using two double-tourbillons working independently. A spherical differential connects the four rotating carriages, distributing torque between two wheels rotating at different speeds.

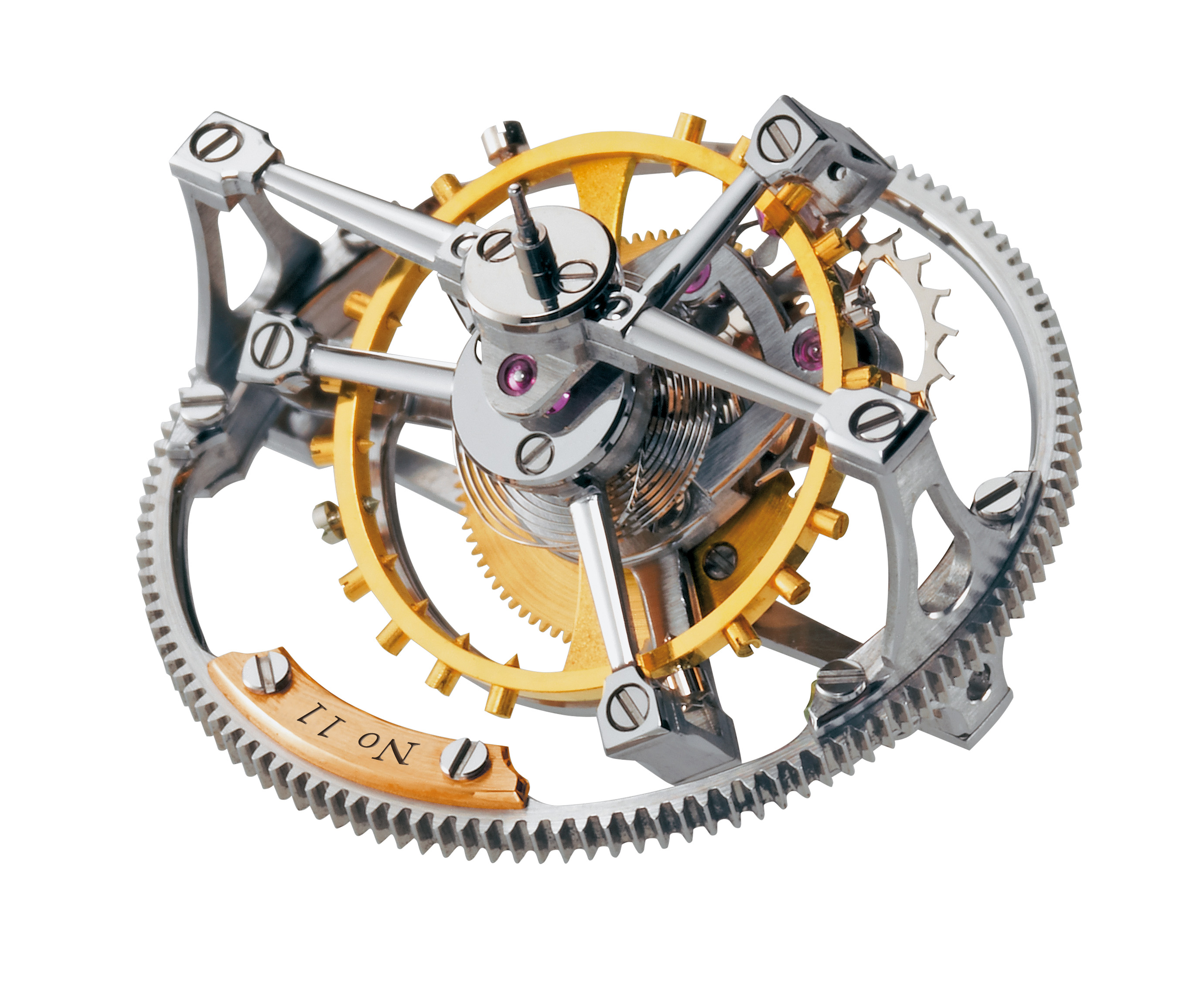
Greubel Forsey Double Tourbillon 30° mechanism

=== Triple-axis tourbillon ===
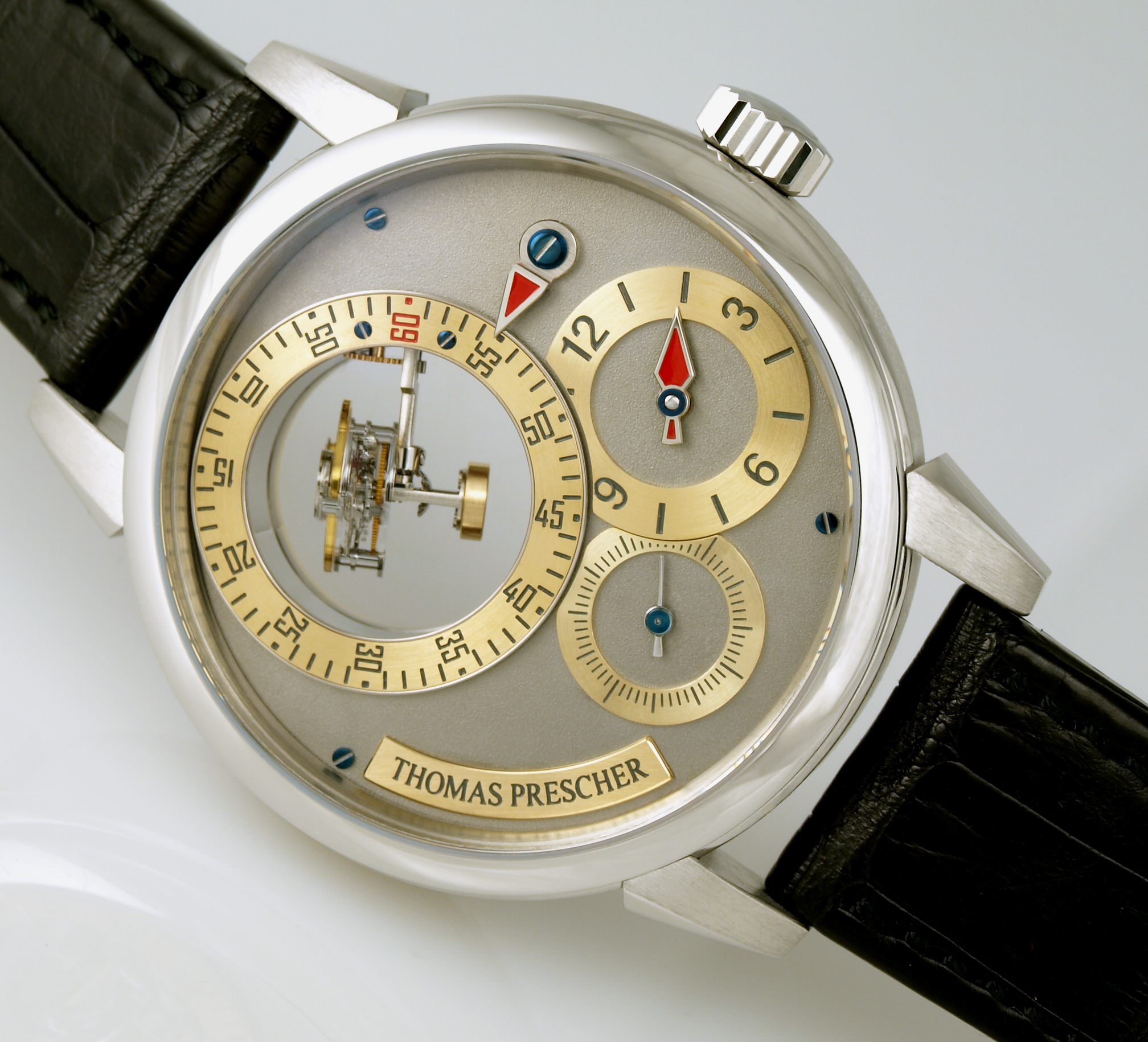
Triple-axis tourbillon by Thomas Prescher

In 2004, Thomas Prescher developed the first triple-axis tourbillon for the Thomas Prescher Haute Horlogerie with constant force in the carriage in a wristwatch. It was presented at Baselworld 2004 in Basel, Switzerland, in a set of three watches including a single-axis, a double-axis and a triple-axis tourbillon.

The world's unique tri-axial tourbillon movement for wristwatch, with traditional jewel bearings only, was invented by the independent watchmaker Aaron Becsei, from Bexei Watches, in 2007. The Primus wristwatch was presented at the Baselworld 2008 in Basel, Switzerland. In the three-axis tourbillon movement, the 3rd (external) cage has a unique form which provides the possibility of using jewel bearings everywhere, instead of ball-bearings. This is a unique solution at this size and level of complication. There are a few wrist and pocket watches that include the Triple Axis or Tri-Axial Tourbillon escapements. Examples of companies and watchmakers that include this mechanism are Vianney Halter in his "Deep Space" watch, Thomas Prescher, Aaron Becsei, Girard-Perregaux with the "Tri-Axial Tourbillon", Purnell with the "Spherion", and Jaeger LeCoultre with the "Heliotourbillon", released in 2024.

=== Flying tourbillon ===
Rather than being supported by a bridge, or cock, at both the top and bottom, the flying tourbillon is cantilevered, being only supported from one side. The first flying tourbillon was designed by Alfred Helwig, instructor at the German School of Watchmaking, in 1920.

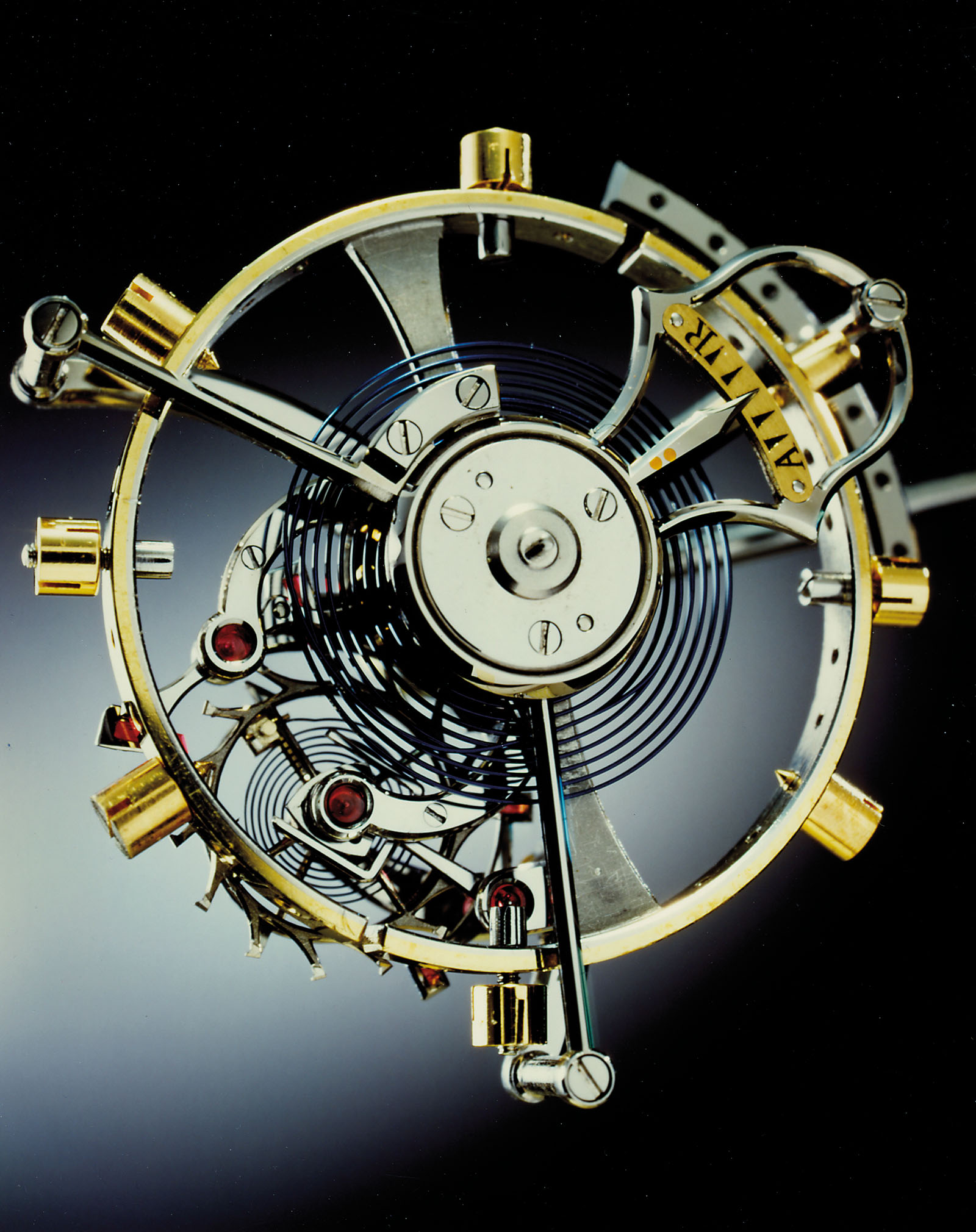
Derek Pratt's one-minute tourbillon carriage with integrated remontoire.

Derek Pratt's pocket watch known as The Oval (officially named the Detent Escapement Tourbillon with Remontoir in an oval case) features a detent escapement, and as a horological first, a constant force mechanism within the carriage (tourbillon). Pratt wrote in the Horological Journal in July 1991, “many remontoire mechanisms have been made over the last 300 hundred years or so but, as far as I know, this watch is the first to have a remontoire incorporated in the carriage of a tourbillon and is, therefore, something new or innovative”. The tourbillon made another appearance in his Double-Wheel Remontoire Tourbillon pocket watch from 1997.

In 1993, Kiu Tai-Yu, a Chinese watchmaker residing in Hong Kong, created a semi-flying tourbillon with only an abbreviated carriage for the escapement wheel and pallet fork, the upper pivot of the balance wheel being supported in a sapphire bridge.

=== Gyro tourbillon ===
Jaeger-LeCoultre's first wristwatch tourbillon was introduced in 1993 (though JLC had produced tourbillons prior to that, including the famous observatory competition caliber 170) and in 2004 the company introduced the Gyrotourbillon I. Gyrotourbillon I is a double-axis tourbillon with a perpetual calendar and equation of time, and since then, Jaeger-LeCoultre has gone on to produce several variations on the multi-axis tourbillon theme. In general, these have been fairly thick watches (Gyrotourbillon I is 16mm thick) but with the Reverso Tribute Gyrotourbillon, JLC has produced a thinner and much more wearable version of its multi-axis tourbillon. At 51.1mm x 31mm x 12.4mm.

== Modern tourbillon watches ==
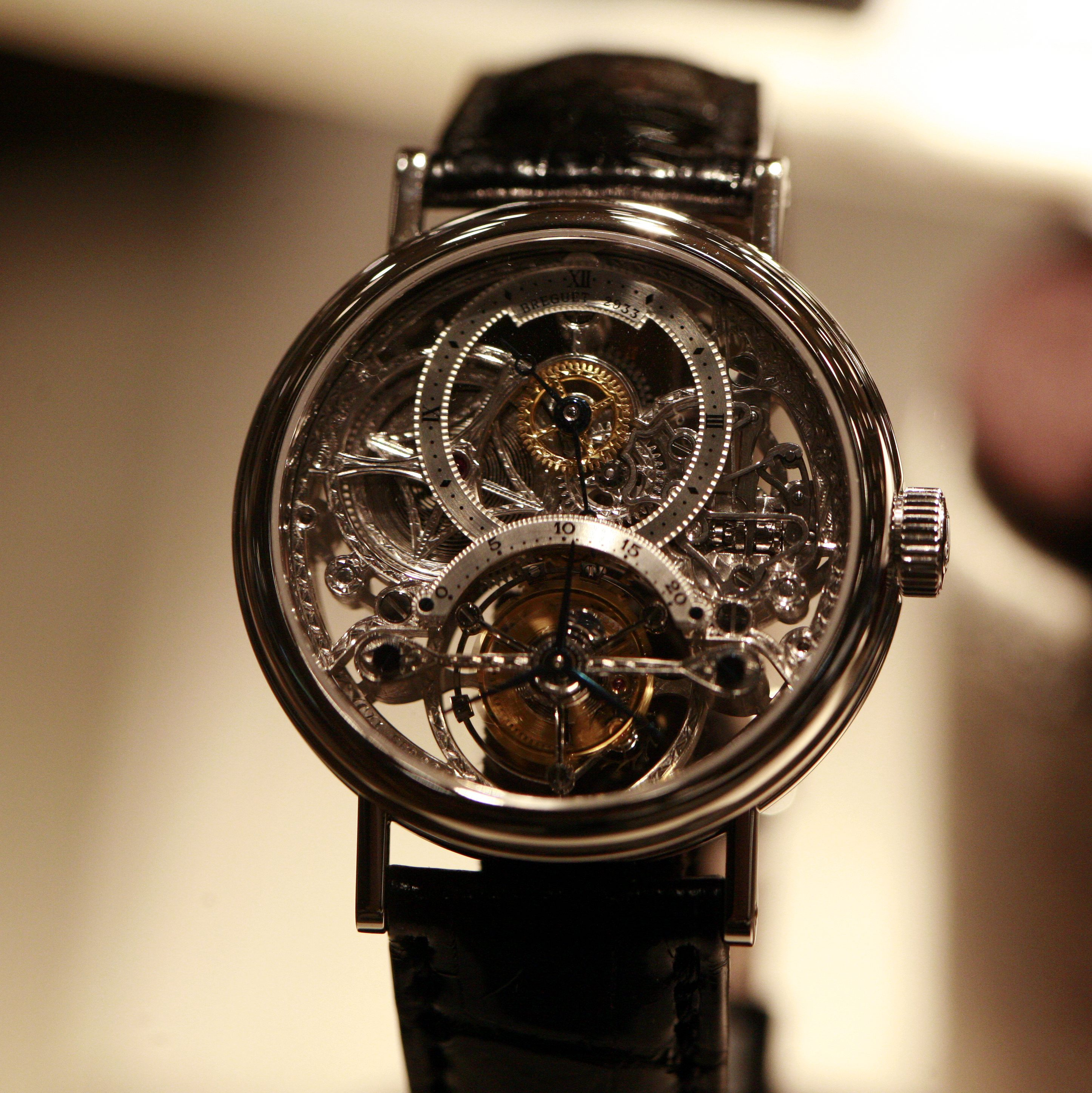
A tourbillon movement watch by Breguet

In modern mechanical watch designs, production of a highly accurate watch does not require a tourbillon. There is even debate among horologists as to whether tourbillons ever improved the accuracy of mechanical watches, even when first introduced, or whether the watches of the day were inherently inaccurate due to design and manufacturing techniques. A tourbillon is a valued feature of collectors' and premium-priced watches, possibly for the same reason that mechanical watches fetch a much higher price than similar quartz watches that are much more accurate.

In recent years, avant-garde watchmakers have shifted their focus towards enhancing the durability and wearability of tourbillon movements, aiming to create timepieces suited for everyday use. Traditionally regarded as delicate complications, tourbillons are now being re-engineered to withstand greater shocks and environmental stresses without compromising precision. Bianchet, which specialises exclusively in tourbillon watches, exemplifies this approach by integrating advanced materials such as titanium and high-performance composite alloys in the tourbillon movement and watch case. Additionally, innovations in movement architecture, including enhanced shock absorption systems, optimised power reserves and water resistance, contribute to making modern tourbillon watches more robust and practical for daily wear. As a result, these tourbillon timepieces are now even endorsed by athletes during sports competitions, demonstrating their resilience in high-intensity conditions.

High-quality tourbillon wristwatches, usually made by the Swiss luxury watch industry, are very expensive, and typically retail for tens of thousands of dollars or euros, with much higher prices in the hundreds of thousands of dollars or euros being common. A recent renaissance of interest in tourbillons has been met by the industry with increased availability of time pieces bearing the feature, with the result that prices for basic tourbillon models have reduced somewhat in recent years. Previously such models were very rare, either antique or new. Any watch with a tourbillon will cost a great deal more than an equivalent piece without the feature. The prices of Swiss models typically start at $40,000 and the prices of more expensive tourbillon watches can reach six figures. The prices of some Chinese models can range from hundreds of dollars to nearly $5,000. The Donald Trump-branded "Victory Tourbillon", however, which is made in China with a production run of 147, costs $100,000.

Modern implementations typically allow the tourbillon to be seen through a window in the watch face. In addition to the decorative effect, a tourbillon can act as a second hand for some watches, if the tourbillon rotates exactly once per minute. Some tourbillons rotate faster than this (Greubel Forsey's 24 second tourbillon for example). Also, many quotidian watches feature their oscillating balance wheel. Sometimes termed, appropriately enough, the "open heart", these are sometimes misrepresented by unscrupulous dealers as a tourbillon (and "tourbillon-style" by ethical ones).

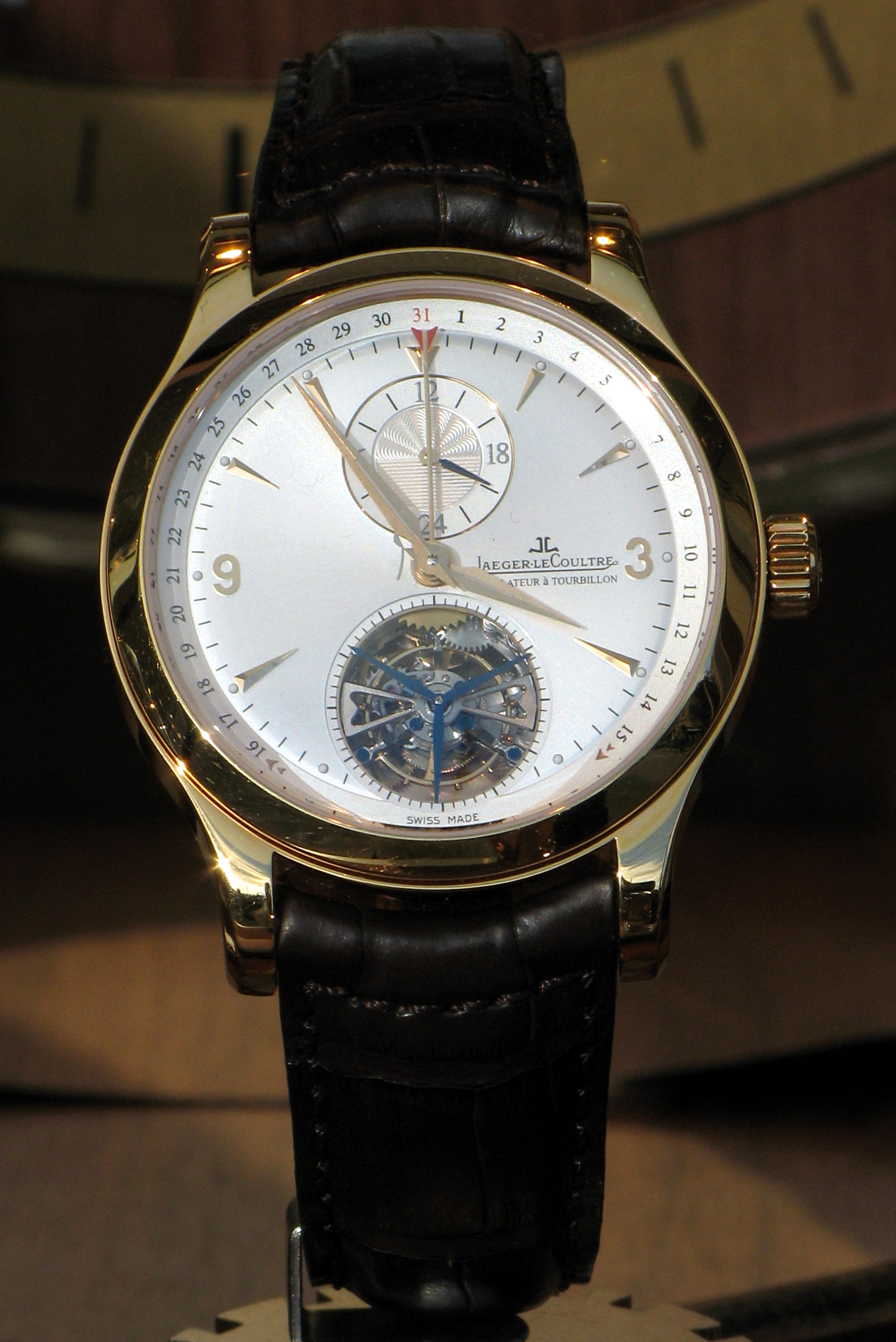
Jaeger-LeCoultre tourbillon movement watch

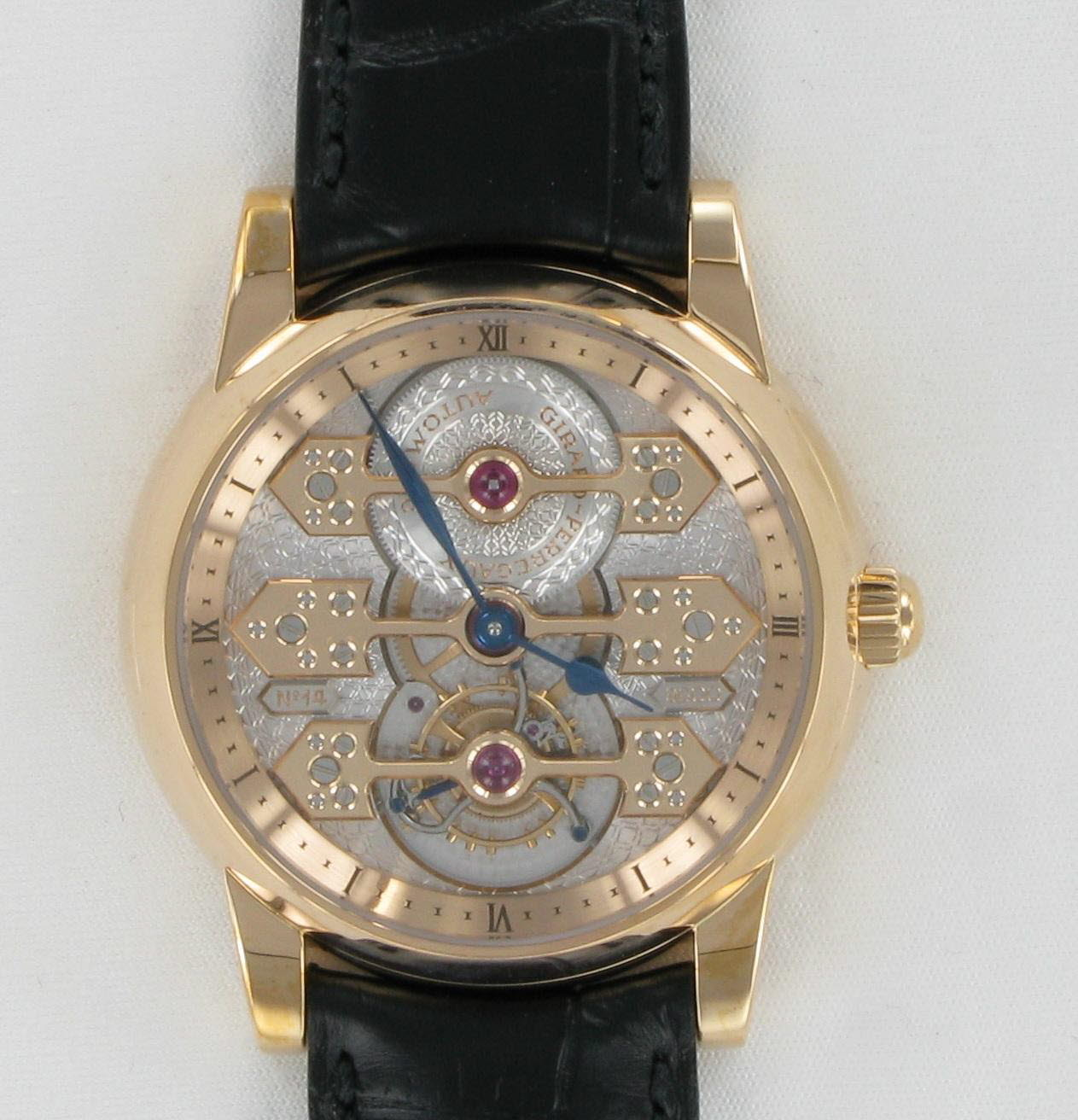
Tourbillon with three gold bridges, Girard-Perregaux

== Improved affordability ==
Several Chinese manufacturers, like Tianjin Seagull, now produce a variety of tourbillon movements. These movements are bought as ébauches by some manufacturers and are sometimes incorporated into watches that meet the requirements of the Federation of the Swiss Watch Industry to be sold as Swiss Made, which requires 60% of the value to have been made in Switzerland. The availability of less expensive tourbillons has led industry spectators to worry that another quartz crisis may occur, where the Swiss watch industry will not be able to adapt quickly to less expensive complicated mechanical watches produced in other countries. In 2016, TAG Heuer began offering the Carrera Heuer-02T tourbillon at a suggested retail price of 14,900 CHF (~US$15,000), significantly lower than the 100,000 CHF or more charged by some other established Swiss watch brands.

== See also ==
- List of most expensive watches sold at auction
- Bugatti Tourbillon – Car named after the tourbillon mechanism
