= Derek Pratt =

Derek Pratt may refer to:

- Derek Pratt (watchmaker) (1938–2009), English horologist and watchmaker
- Derek Pratt (cricketer) (1925–1997), English cricketer
