= Derek Pratt (watchmaker) =

English watchmaker (1938–2009)

Derek Pratt FBHI
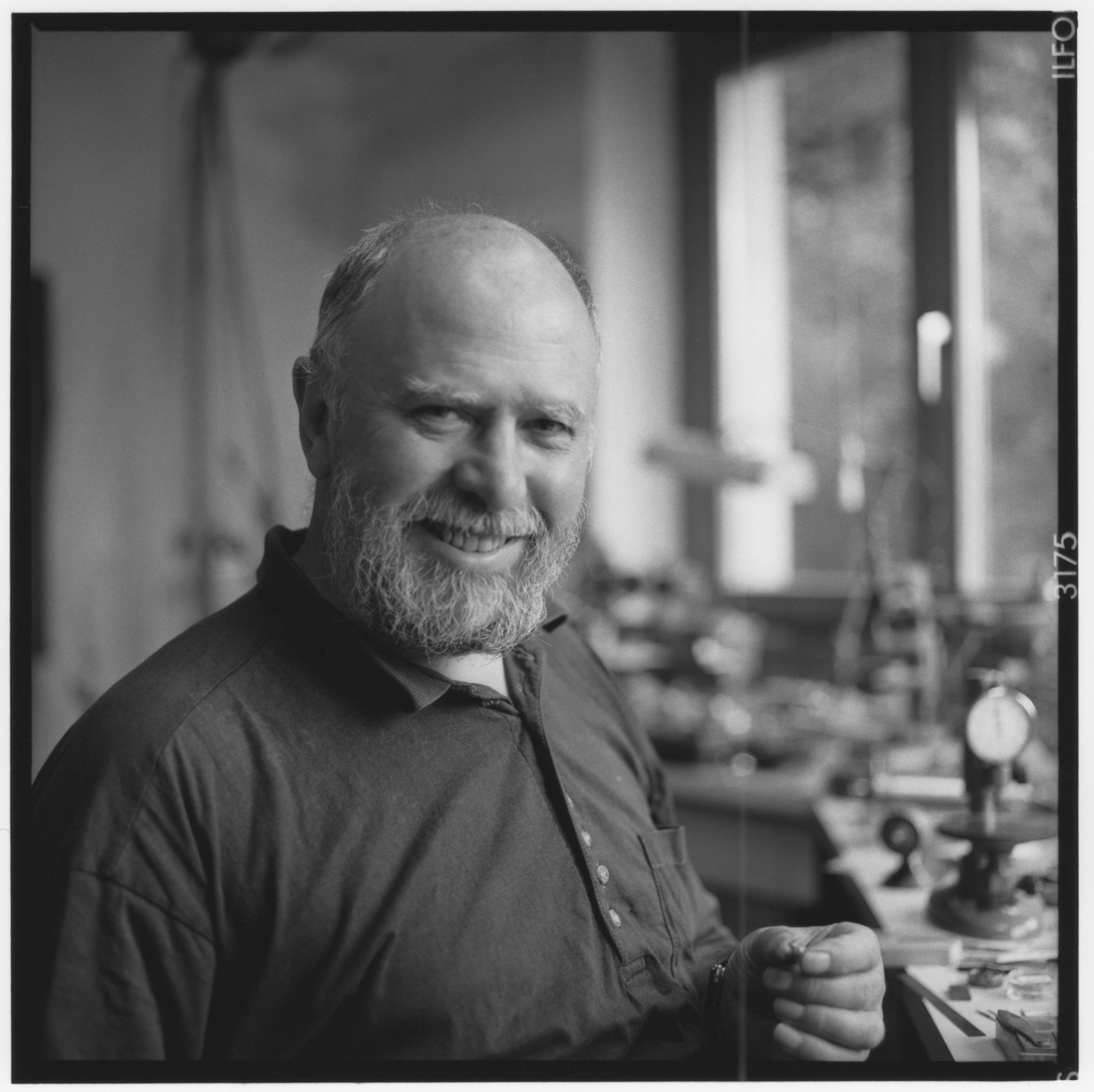
- Derek Pratt, watchmaker, in his workshop
- Born: Derek Francis Pratt; 9 May 1938; Orpington, England
- Died: 16 September 2009 (aged 71)
- Occupations: Horologist; Watchmaker

Derek Francis Pratt FBHI (9 May 1938 – 16 September 2009) was an English horologist and watchmaker. Regarded by many within the field as a highly accomplished 20th-century watchmaker, Pratt was particularly noted for his contributions to high-end timepieces produced under the Urban Jürgensen brand. Additionally, he gained recognition for his independent creations, including an oval watch in the style of Breguet and a reconstruction of John Harrison's H4 marine chronometer. His development of watches incorporating remontoires that act directly on the escapement, even within a tourbillon mechanism, is considered a significant technical achievement. Pratt's engine-turned (guilloché) dials are also recognized for their quality.

== Early life ==
Pratt, born in Orpington, England, developed an early interest in watchmaking. He was known by the nickname 'Ticker' during his childhood. He attended Beckenham Technical School, and began formal training in watch and clock technology in 1955 at the National College of Horology in London. At the same time, he held a student apprenticeship at S Smith and Sons (now known as Smiths Group) in Cricklewood, north London. The three-year training was intended to include the finishing and assembly of a pocket watch, but due to a slump in the British watch industry, the syllabus was abruptly changed, and the class was denied that experience. This change led to Pratt's early departure from the program.

The former director of Horology at the College and Pratt's tutor, Andrew Fell, hired him after he completed additional training in production engineering and tool design. Together, they worked on clocks inside black boxes used in aviation as well as micro-soldering devices for the then burgeoning field of microelectronics. It was this work that took Pratt to Switzerland, where he was to spend the rest of his life, and to embark on his career as a watchmaker.

== Career ==
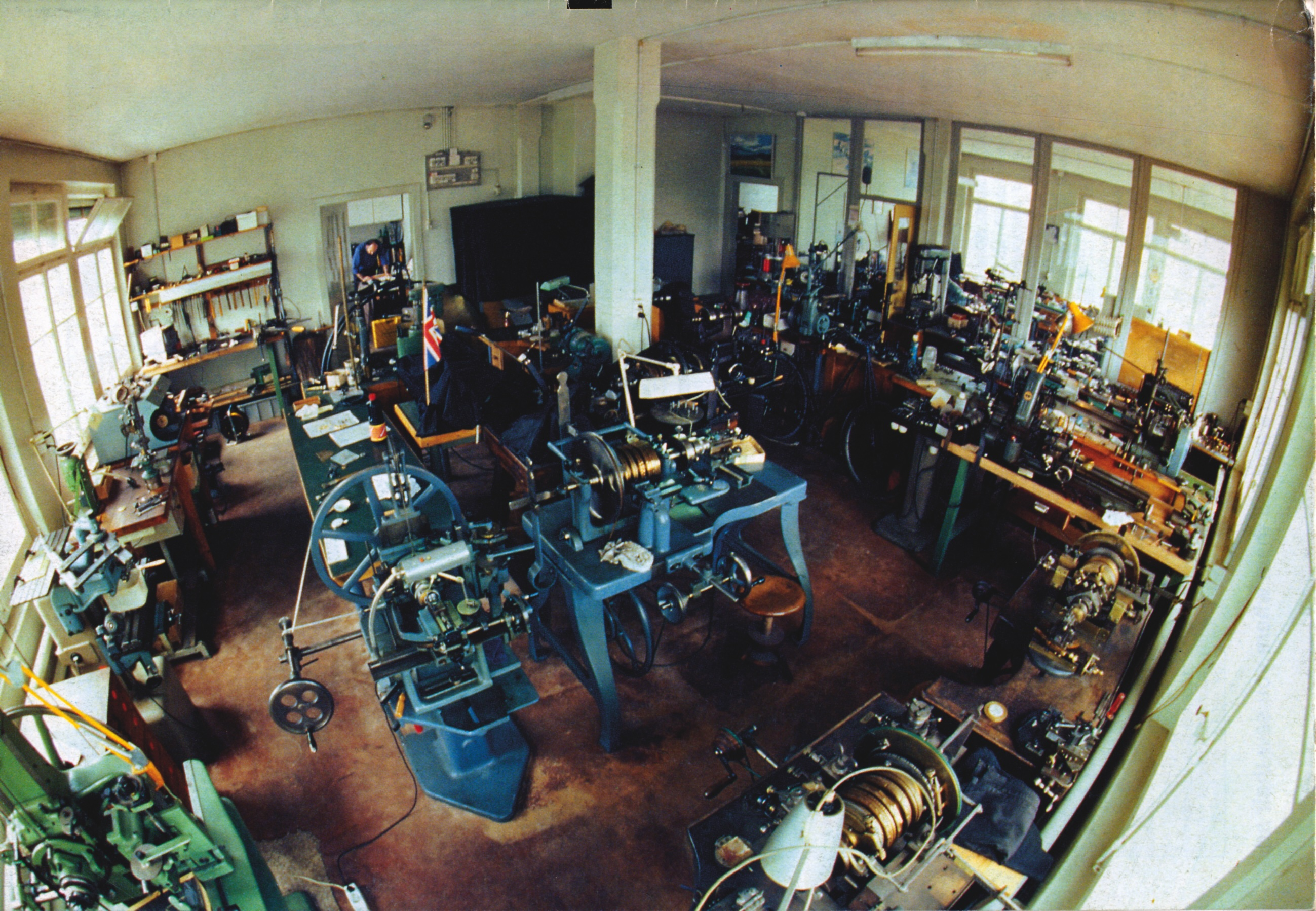
Derek Pratt's workshop in Bellach, Switzerland, in the 1980s

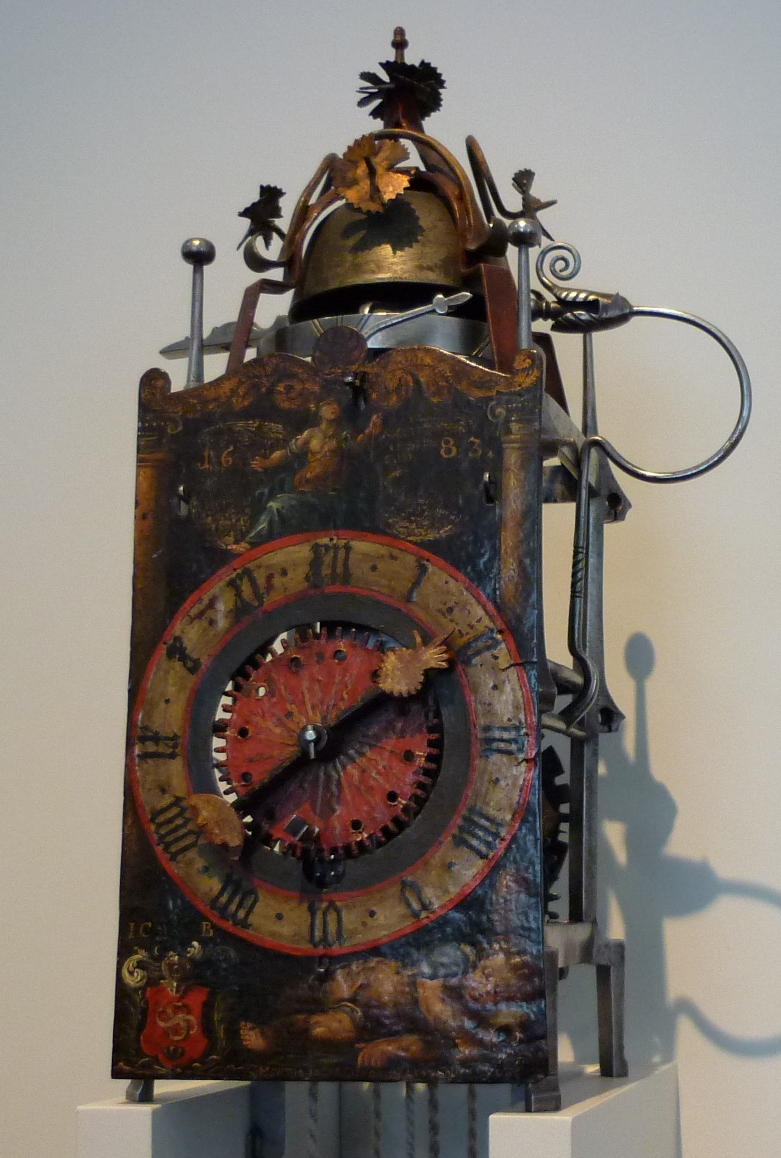
Erhard Liechti clock from 1580

After his work at Andrew Fells's companies, A. & M. Fell Ltd. and Felmada, ended in the early 1960s, Pratt took jobs at small companies specializing in microelectronics. One of them was with Kulicke & Soffa, a semiconductor manufacturer. In 1972, Pratt established his own business, specializing in watch and clock restoration and development. His horological interests included Gothic iron clocks such as those by Erhard Liechti (de); he also repaired household clocks, and worked on intricate and singular pocket watches.

A commission to repair a watch for the Swiss entrepreneur and antique watch dealer Peter Baumberger led to friendship and a business partnership that spanned decades. Amongst the watches Pratt restored for Baumberger was Vacheron Constantin No. 402833, a grand complication made for King Fuad I of Egypt in 1929.

Amidst the Quartz crisis in the Swiss watchmaking industry, Pratt saw an opportunity and pursued a different approach: he acquired those seemingly obsolete tools of the trade, expanding his workshop with lathes, milling and guilloché machines. His focus was on hand making watches from the smallest screw to the case, and continuing restoration work on antique pieces. These machines were crucial for the work Pratt was to do under the historic brand Urban Jürgensen & Sønner, which had been purchased and revived by Peter Baumberger in the late 1970s. Pratt also did a lot of work by hand, with a piercing saw or turns.Pratt possessed a strong understanding of mechanical principles and focused on the refinement of horological escapements. He developed noteworthy but little known solutions.

He started crafting entirely handmade remontoir tourbillon pocket watches using hand tools and hand-operated machine tools. The remontoir, producing a constant force, was an equally constant theme in Pratt's work: he encountered it both in the aircraft clocks as well as John Harrison's famous H4 marine chronometer. Pratt achieved a configuration where the remontoir directly drove the escapement, even within a tourbillon.

=== Consulting and collaborations ===
==== The Urban Jürgensen years ====
In 1979, Peter Baumberger bought the 18th century Danish brand Urban Jürgensen und Sønner (now known as Urban Jürgensen or UJS) and in 1982, he brought Pratt on board as a consultant and technical director. Pratt would remain in that role until 2005. The vintage watch collector and expert Helmut Crott (and subsequent owner of the brand), noted in 2011 that perhaps "only his association with Derek gave Peter the confidence to finalize the deal. Derek was almost certainly the key factor in the acquisition of UJS; his extraordinary skills were needed for the 90 historic movements to be finished, cased and sold." Pratt's involvement with Urban Jürgensen was pivotal to the brand's revival and success with collectors in the 1980s and 1990s.

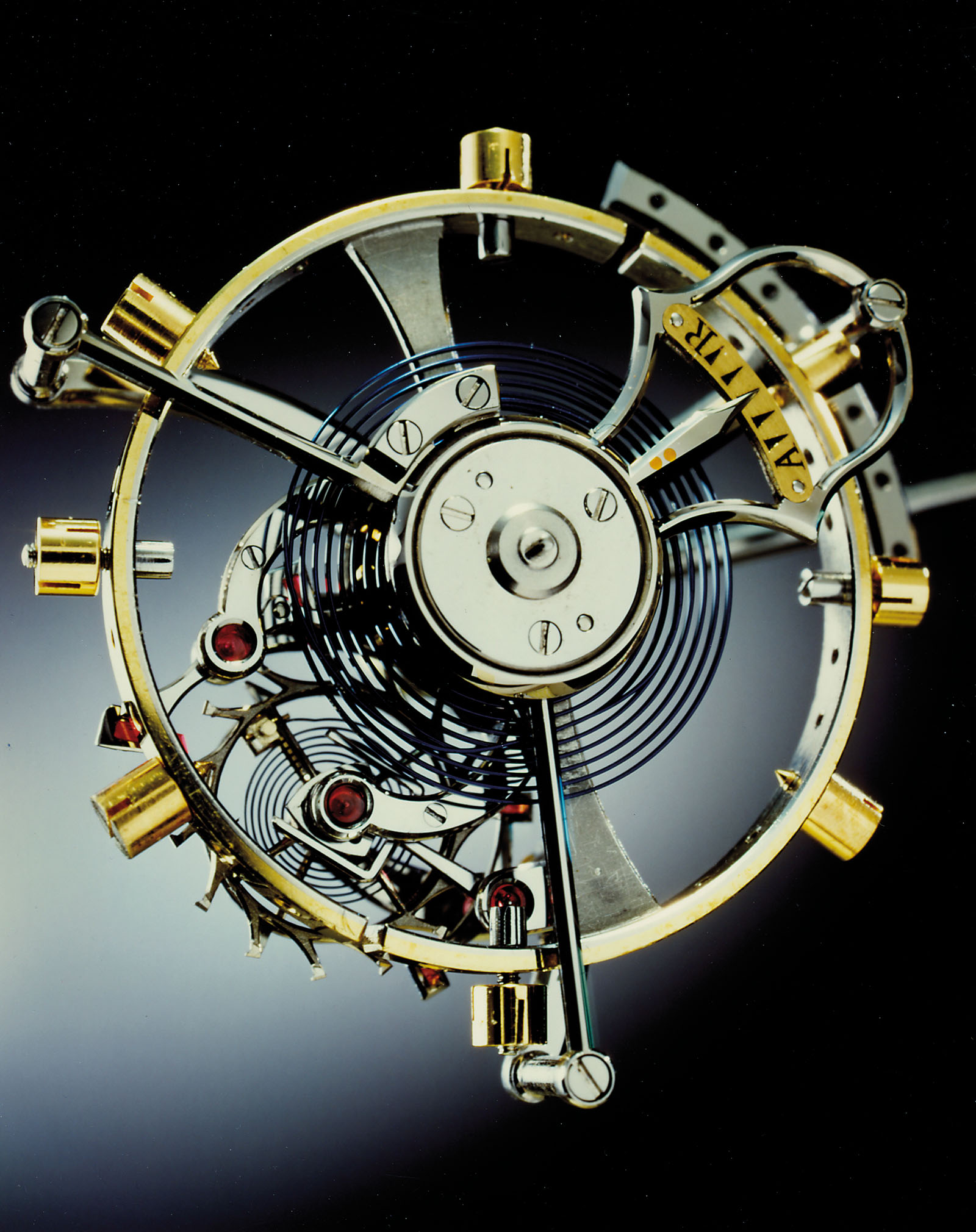
Remontoire carriage of a tourbillon pocket watch made by Derek Pratt

These decades were Pratt's most productive period: he made a series of pocket watches, mostly under the Urban Jürgensen name. He called these watches 'remontoire-tourbillons'. They are described in an article titled "A Tourbillon indicating full seconds with carriage-mounted remontoire, twin barrels and up & down indicator" from July 1991. These watches marked the introduction of the Wankel-inspired Reuleaux triangle to operate the remontoir. The pocket watch described in the article had a one-second remontoire. Pratt wrote that, to his knowledge, it was the first watch to mount a remontoire within the tourbillon carriage.

In that Horological Journal article from July 1991, Pratt started out by stating "It is very difficult to produce anything new in mechanical horology. Something is lacking however in most contemporary horology and that is innovation." In 1981, Pratt embarked on combining the two inventions, thus creating what is now known as his "First series remontoire-tourbillon watches" [sic]. The three watches also feature Pratt's engine-turning (guilloché) skills. Guilloché dials often have different patterns in different regions with the hard-to-execute change hidden by a chapter ring. Pratt's precise execution enabled variations in the guilloché pattern without the need to hide the junction. In the nineteen nineties, Pratt made a further series of three watches, known as the "second series". Their mechanical principles are identical to those of the first series. These watches have a minimalist steel bridge replacing the back plate, which reveals the movement of the watch. Furthermore, in this series, the cam is made from synthetic ruby, rather than steel.

In addition to the pocket watches Pratt made under the Urban Jürgensen brand, he also completed a sizable number of unfinished pocket watches that had come with the sale of the brand. Pratt added complications, finished and cased them. He also produced many guilloché dials for UJS pocket watches and wristwatches.

According to Helmut Crott, Pratt completed about 34 pocket watches for Urban Jürgensen, including around a dozen with tourbillons.

In 2003, Pratt began testing a pivoted detent escapement in a Unitas wristwatch movement. Jean-François Mojon took over development, and Kari Voutilainen helped finish, assemble and regulate the early prototypes. Urban Jürgensen presented a prototype of the resulting P8 calibre at Baselworld in 2011.

==== Collaboration with George Daniels ====
While working for the Urban Jürgensen brand, Pratt was developing other ideas, and in regular exchange with his close friend George Daniels.

The co-axial escapement was attributed solely to Daniels for many years. In the horological world, however, it is well known that Pratt played an important role in bringing this revolutionary invention to life. Pratt advised Daniels on the co-axial escapement and made components for Daniels's watches, including the combined wheel and pinion for the ultra-thin version of the escapement. His expertise in electrical discharge machining, also known as spark erosion, was critical to making the pinion. Daniels and Pratt spoke on the phone every Sunday morning for years, discussing what they were working on in great detail, with sketches exchanged by fax.

Daniels contributed to "Remembering Derek", published in the December 2009 issue of the Horological Journal. He wrote: "Derek's understanding of escapements was of great assistance to me. He immediately saw the benefit of the coaxial escapement and enthusiastically accompanied me in visiting factories to discuss its worth. He could speak French and Swiss German fluently, which was essential to our needs." And according to Timothy Treffry, Pratt significantly helped Daniels make the case for the co-axial escapement to Swiss manufacturers and became "an important intermediary" while Omega adapted it for mass production.

Pratt was a modest man. In the July 1999 issue of the Horological Journal, he happily gave Daniels full credit: "What a great time this is for British horology. All horologists should feel as proud and excited as I do about the launch of George Daniels' escapement in an Omega watch. The fact that Swatch Group have found the courage, not to mention the money, to put a new escapement into mid-market watches is wonderful news for mechanical horology. That this escapement is to succeed Mudge’s lever escapement (developed to its ultimate form by the Swiss) fills me with pride."

Whilst Pratt was talking about his remontoir-tourbillons in his July 1991 article, arguably, the co-axial escapement represents another one of these rare innovations that came out of modern times, and in part, his hands (as noted above, he made the crucial dual-purpose escape pinion). Today, the co-axial escapement is central to the mechanical identity of any Omega watch, used in most of the mechanical watch models currently produced by Omega SA.

According to David Newman, former Chairman of the George Daniels Educational Trust, Pratt was Daniels' greatest horological friend, and a brilliant horologist. Daniels' tribute to Pratt ended with this note: "With Derek's passing we have all lost an important mechanical horologist of great experience and great knowledge, who was above all generous and congenial in his dealings with others. I have simply lost a brilliant horological friend and companion."

==== Wristwatch collaborations ====
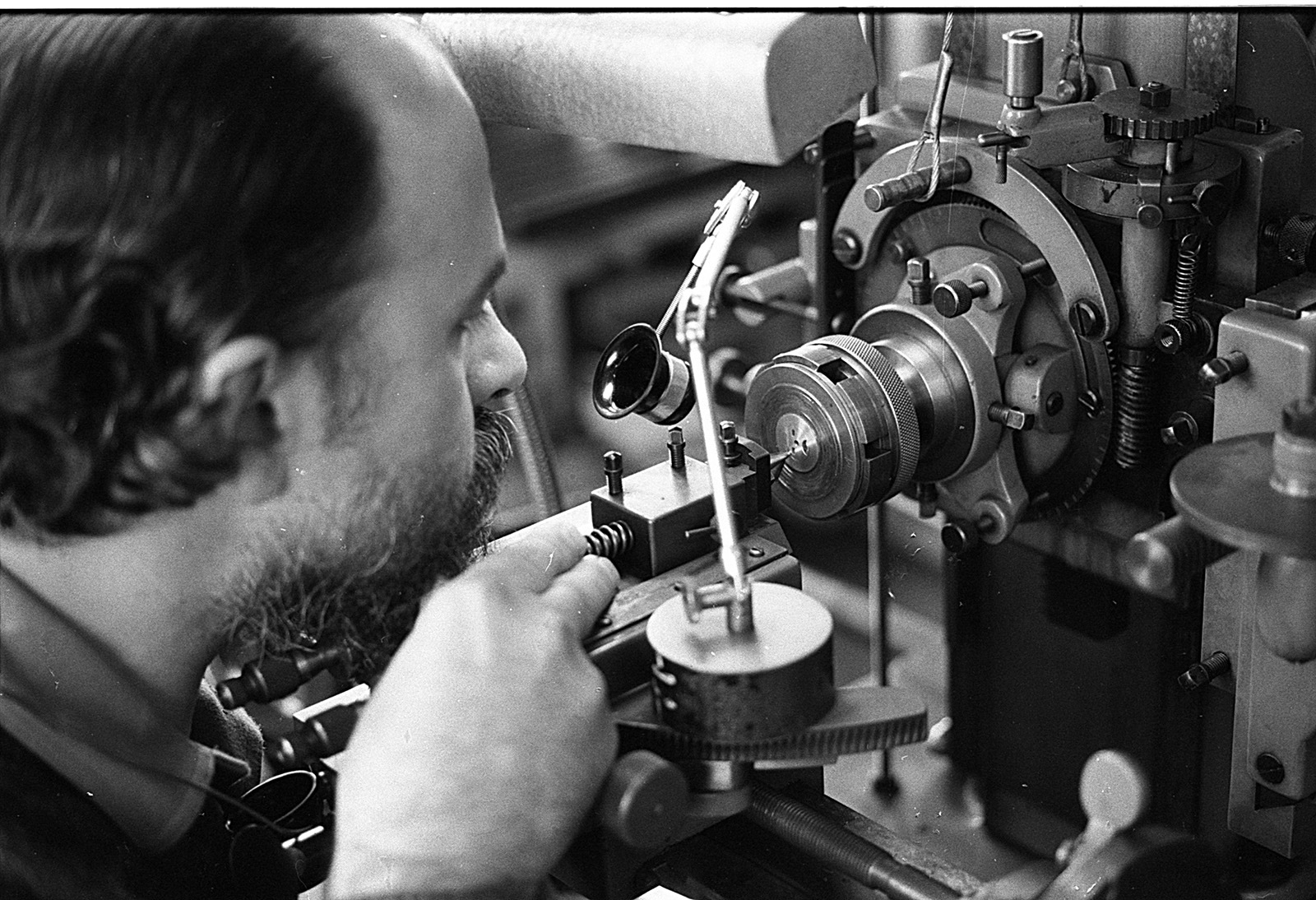
Derek Pratt working on an engine-turned (guilloché) dial.

Pratt loved solitude in the workshop, but cultivating friendships with fellow watch- and clockmakers was very important to him, too. In addition to the weekly calls with George Daniels, he had lively exchanges with peers in Switzerland, the UK and the US. He opened the doors to his workshop to countless students of horology and was interested in the next generation of watchmakers. He also frequently contributed articles for the Horological Journal and attended as many events hosted by the Worshipful Company of Clockmakers as possible. Pratt became a Freeman of the Worshipful Company of Clockmakers in 1979, and a Liveryman in 1982 and received its rarely awarded Tompion Gold Medal in 2006.

Pratt had wanted to make a wristwatch featuring the Reuleaux triangle remontoir mechanism for a long time. In 2008, already in quite poor health, Pratt shared this idea with Stewart Lesemann and Ron DeCorte, two American watchmakers. DeCorte was the driving force behind the project. Together, they envisioned a wristwatch with a movement that would house twin suspended barrels and a one-second remontoir. Small wristwatch movements make the application of a remontoir quite challenging. This challenge aligned with Pratt's interest in resolving complex mechanical problems.

As Lesemann was working on the first and second prototype of the Derek Pratt Remontoir d'Égalité, Luca Soprana expressed interest in the work. Pratt and Soprana first met some years earlier, when Soprana, an Italian watchmaker, had visited Pratt’s workshop as a WOSTEP student. Lesemann continued work on the watch after Pratt's passing, and in 2011, presented the third prototype at the Derek Pratt Memorial Seminar, hosted by the British Horological Institute.

In 2014, DeCorte brought in Tom Bales, an American entrepreneur and watch collector. Bales invested into the completion of the watch, which Soprana took on. Since then, a handful of Derek Pratt Remontoir d'Égalité watches have been produced under the Derek Pratt trademark. With these watches, Derek Pratt's legacy is carried forth by Luca Soprana.

=== Independent watchmaking ===
==== The Oval ====
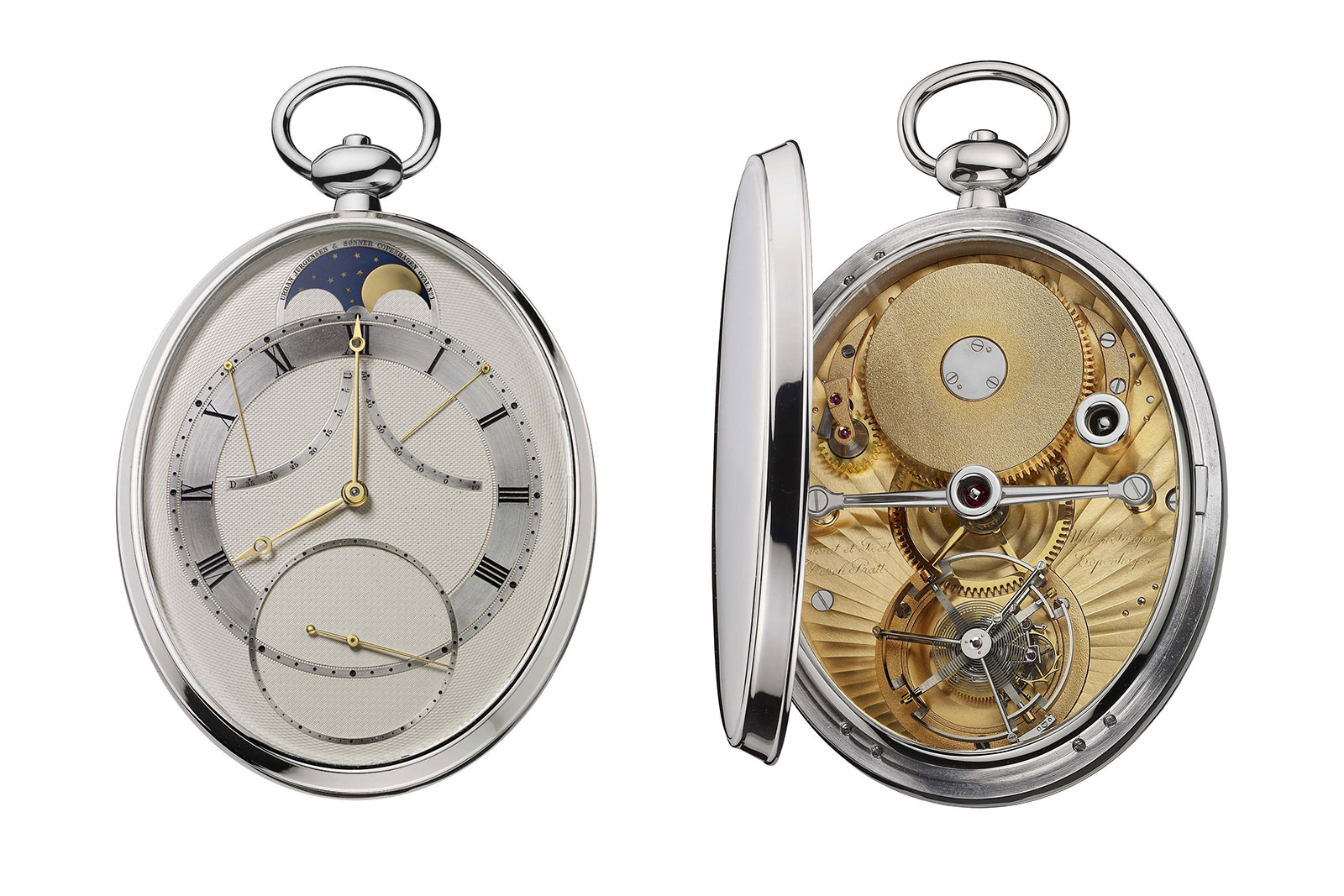
"The Oval", by Derek Pratt

In 1982, as the Quartz crisis hit the Swiss industry, Pratt focused on his true passion – mechanical watchmaking – and embarked on a new project, a pocket watch known as The Oval. Officially named the Detent Escapement Tourbillon with Remontoir in an oval case, it has been described as Pratt's magnum opus.

The Oval's movement incorporates a remontoire within a flying tourbillon (an arrangement he had developed for his earlier tourbillon pocket watches), detent escapement, a central minute-wheel bridge, "flying" mainspring barrel, moon phase, power reserve and thermometer. The movement, visible through a hinged case back, is widely considered one of the greatest achievements in modern watchmaking.

The oval shape of the watch appealed to Pratt aesthetically. Pratt's April 1993 article for the Horological Journal noted that the oval design also allowed for "some useful variations to the layout of a tourbillon watch with a large barrel placed at one end of the oval and a larger carriage for the tourbillon at the other."

The shape also presented challenges. Pratt wrote in the same article "The problem uppermost in my mind was how to make an oval case complete with domed glass." He expressed hope that an engine-turning machine with an oval chuck he had in his arsenal would allow him to create the shape. He referenced the 1894 book "The Principles & Practice of Ornamental or Complex Turning" by John Jacob Holtzapffel and noted intending to use "an oval turning head made to fit on a Schaublin 102 lathe which was driven by the lathe headstock."

Pratt constructed this watch entirely by hand, including the silver case, crystals, dial, hands and the movement.

Although he sometimes outsourced components to specialists, after the craftsmen he usually approached for crystals (glass) declined the work, he made the convex oval crystals himself. This required purchasing a small furnace and considerable practice. He described his process of experimentation with the glass in the same April 1993 Horological Journal article.

The large silver guilloché dial features a moon phase at 12 o’clock, a precise hour chapter ring, and a large seconds counter at 6 o’clock. The fan-shaped thermometer and power reserve indicators are symmetrically placed below the moon phase.

The moon-phase display was sawn and filed by hand. The moon disc is made of blued steel, with moons of gold pressed into twin apertures, and punched in stars inlaid with gold.

Writing about the Oval, SJX described Pratt as “having long been a master of engine turning” and, comparing its dial with George Daniels’ best work, concluded that “Pratt certainly proves to be the better guillocheur.” The Oval’s dial is engine turned in different styles, ranging from a basketweave motif to circular and straight-line barley corn patterns. Edges are outlined by a fluted border referred to as a filet sauté.

In 1985, financial constraints led him to sell the watch in its raw state (known as an ébauche in horological terms) to Peter Baumberger. As a result, the Urban Jürgensen name appears on the dial.

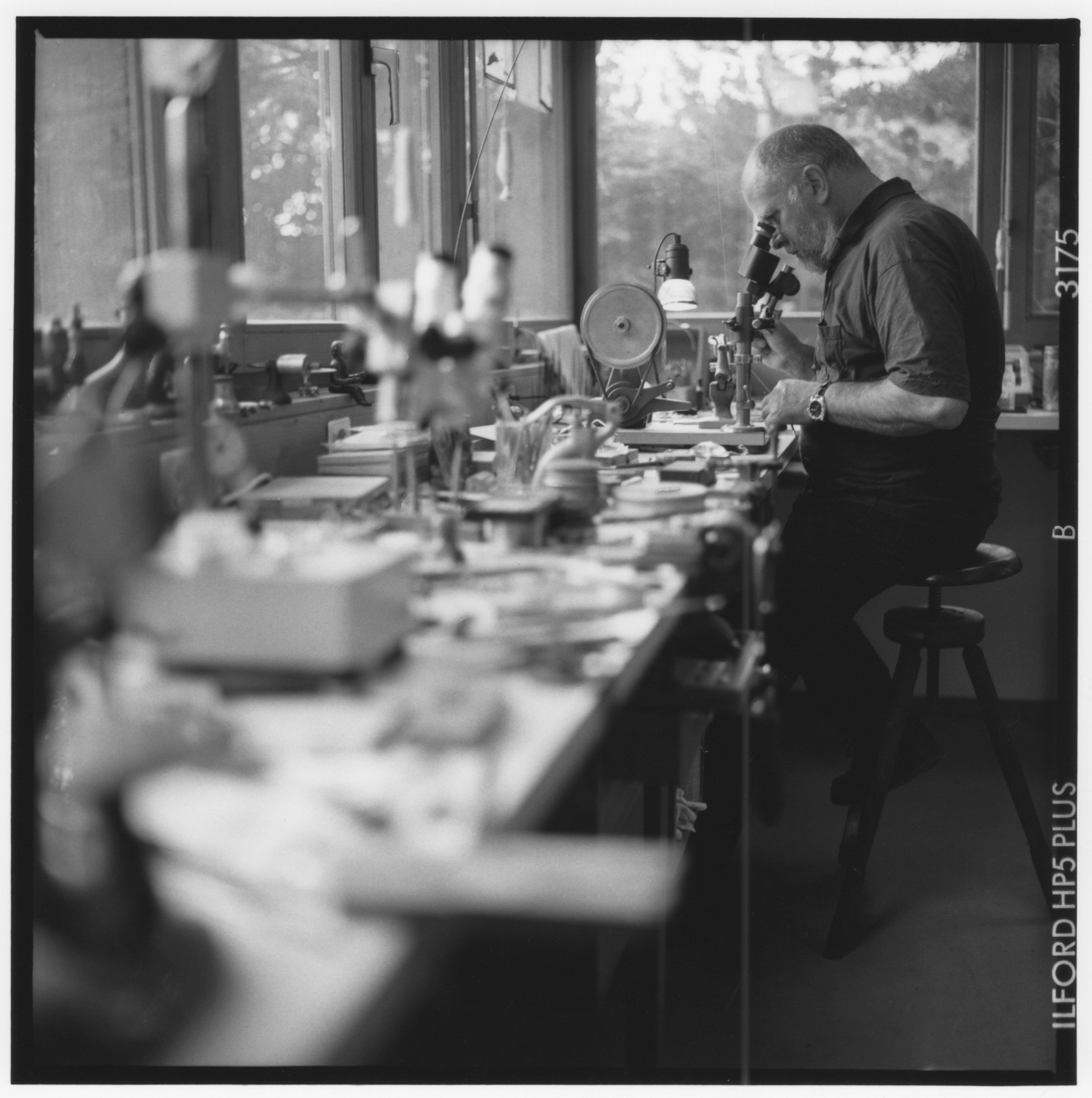
In his workshop in Balm bei Günsberg, Switzerland, late 1990s

Pratt wrote in April 1993 for the trade publication Horological Journal, "...on seeing the oval Breguet No. 1682 / 4761, [...] I felt positively inspired and resolved to make an oval watch myself." The Oval was intended as an homage to horology's luminaries Abraham-Louis Breguet, John Arnold and Alfred Helwig. In the same year, the watch was shown as a working version at Baselworld.

Baumberger engaged Pratt to continue his work on the Oval into the 2000s. However, in 2004, Baumberger chose to have the movement's finishing work done by Kari Voutilainen, another watchmaker he had engaged for work on the Urban Jürgensen brand. The finishing work was executed to a high standard by Voutilainen. Sources state that Pratt was not informed in advance of the decision, and that he took issue with it. In 2005, Peter Baumberger sold the Oval to the collector and scholar of horology Helmut Crott.

In 2024, nearly two decades later, Crott put it up for auction. It was sold at auction in November 2024, for 3,690,000 Swiss francs (then about $4,200,000).

==== The Derek Pratt Double-wheel Remontoir Tourbillon ====
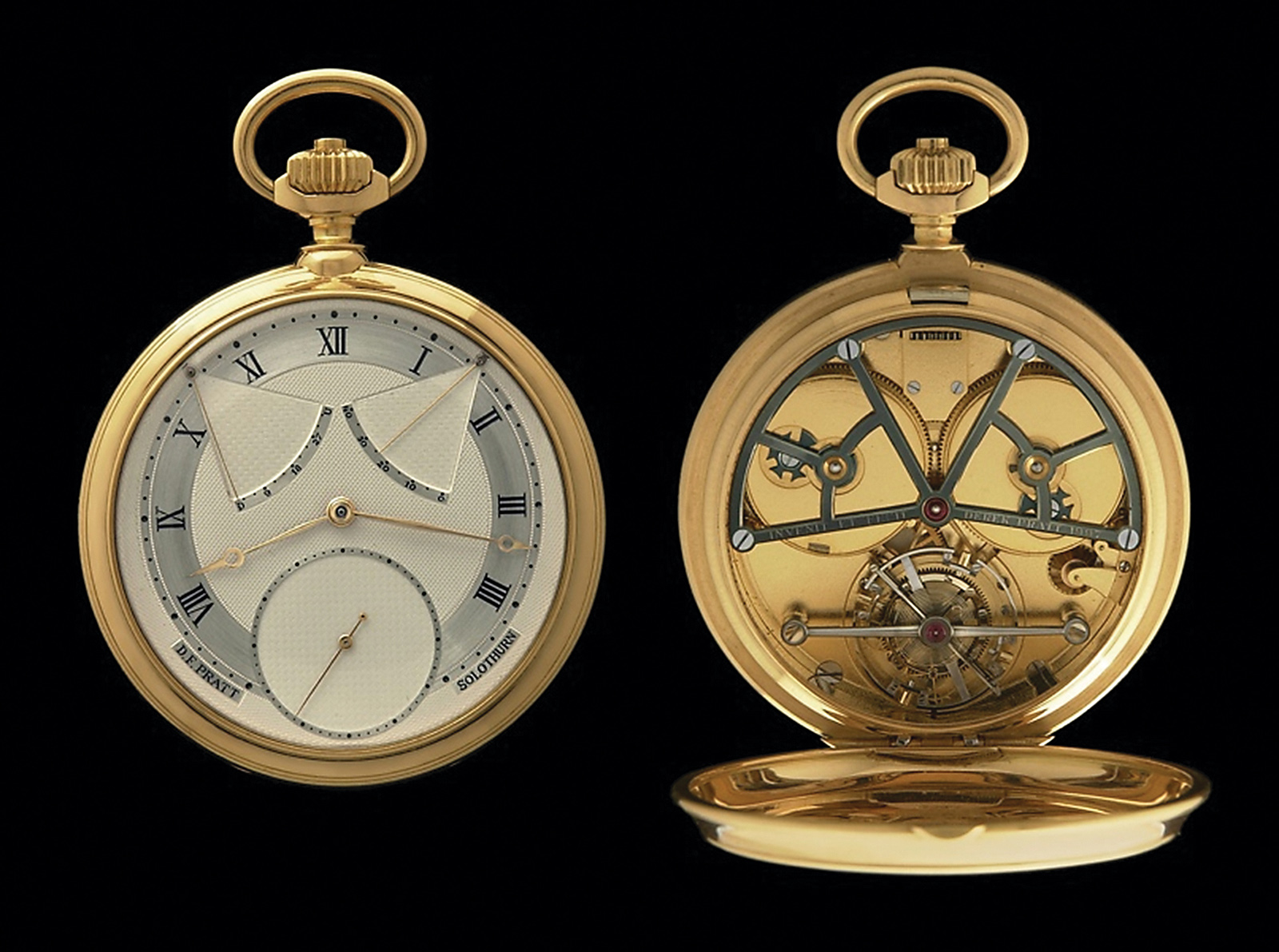
Derek Pratt's Double Wheel Remontoir Tourbillon from 1997

In 1997, Pratt created a pocket watch known as the Derek Pratt Double-wheel Remontoir Tourbillon. It was his submission for the Prix Abraham-Louis Breguet, a tourbillon contest held by the Breguet foundation to commemorate the 250th anniversary of Abraham-Louis Breguet's birth. The competition was to celebrate innovative mechanical ideas in horology. Pratt chose to make a Double-wheel Remontoire Tourbillon pocket watch, knowing that this produced far better timekeeping. It also perfected and enhanced two of Breguet's inventions. Pratt's realization that a fixed wheel with both inward and outward facing teeth would drive the twin escape wheels in opposite directions provided the only tenable solution for an échappement naturel in a tourbillon watch. The watch had two mainspring barrels and a separate remontoire within each escape wheel. The two remontoires wound and discharged alternately as the wheels turned in opposite directions.

His pocket watch submission, which, like the Oval, was built entirely by hand, features a guilloché dial divided into different patterns, with two fan-shaped displays on the top half of the dial. The sector on the left indicates the power reserve, and the one on the right indicates the temperature in Breguet style. The skeletonized steel train bridge reads 'Invenit et fecit, Derek Pratt, 1997'. Pratt did not win the competition, the award went to Carole Forestier for her concept that eventually became the Ulysse Nardin Freak.

The watch is on display at the Clockmaker's Museum (housed in The Science Museum in London).

After completing the pocket watch, Pratt made a preliminary study for a double-wheel wristwatch, including the layout of the keyless work. In May 2004, when Charles Frodsham & Co. was testing its spring-detent wristwatch prototypes, Pratt showed the team his 1997 pocket watch and suggested adapting Daniels's independent double-wheel escapement to improve reliability in a wristwatch. Frodsham developed the idea into its Double Impulse Chronometer, introduced in 2018.

==== Reconstruction of H4 ====
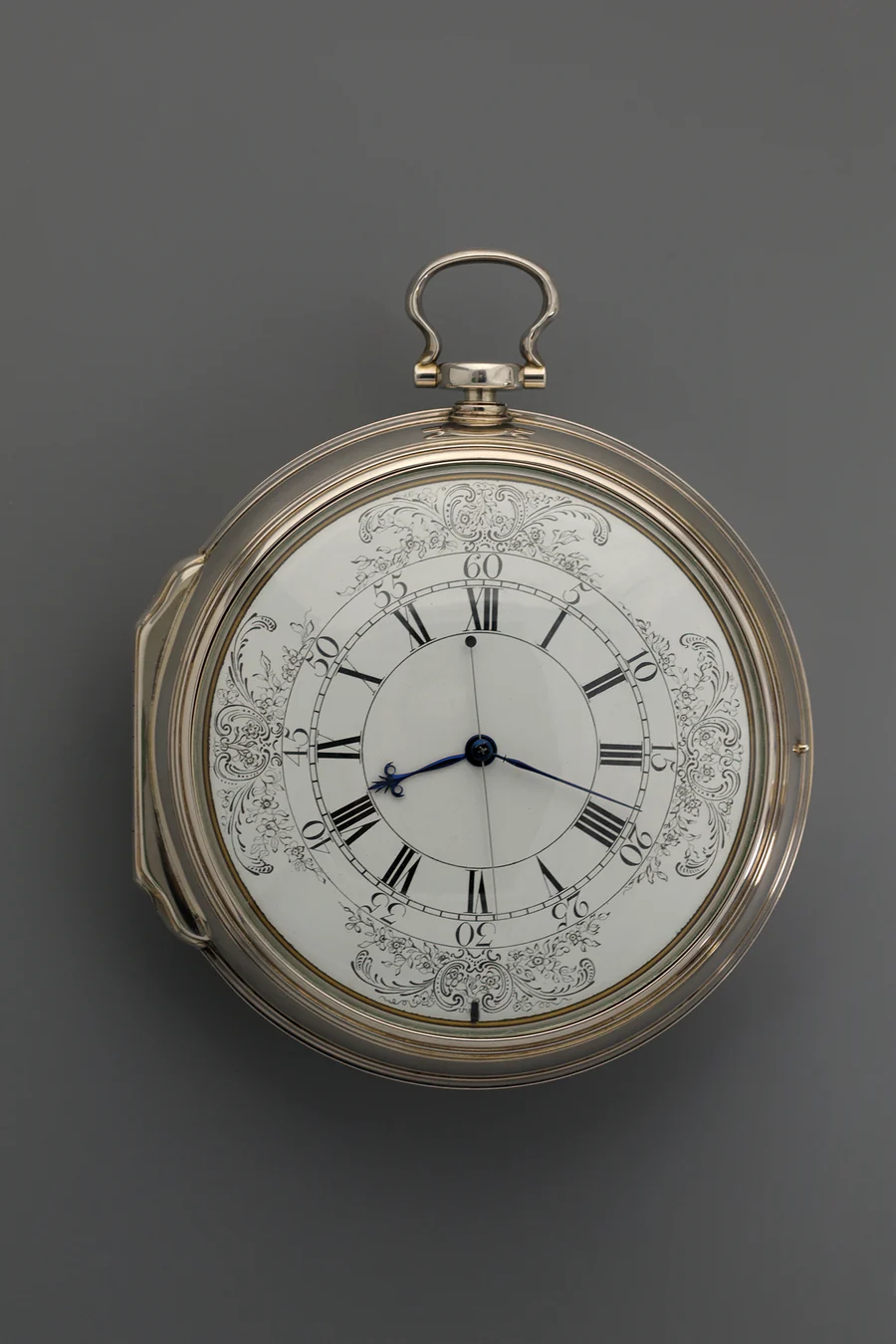
Pratt's reconstruction of John Harrison's H4

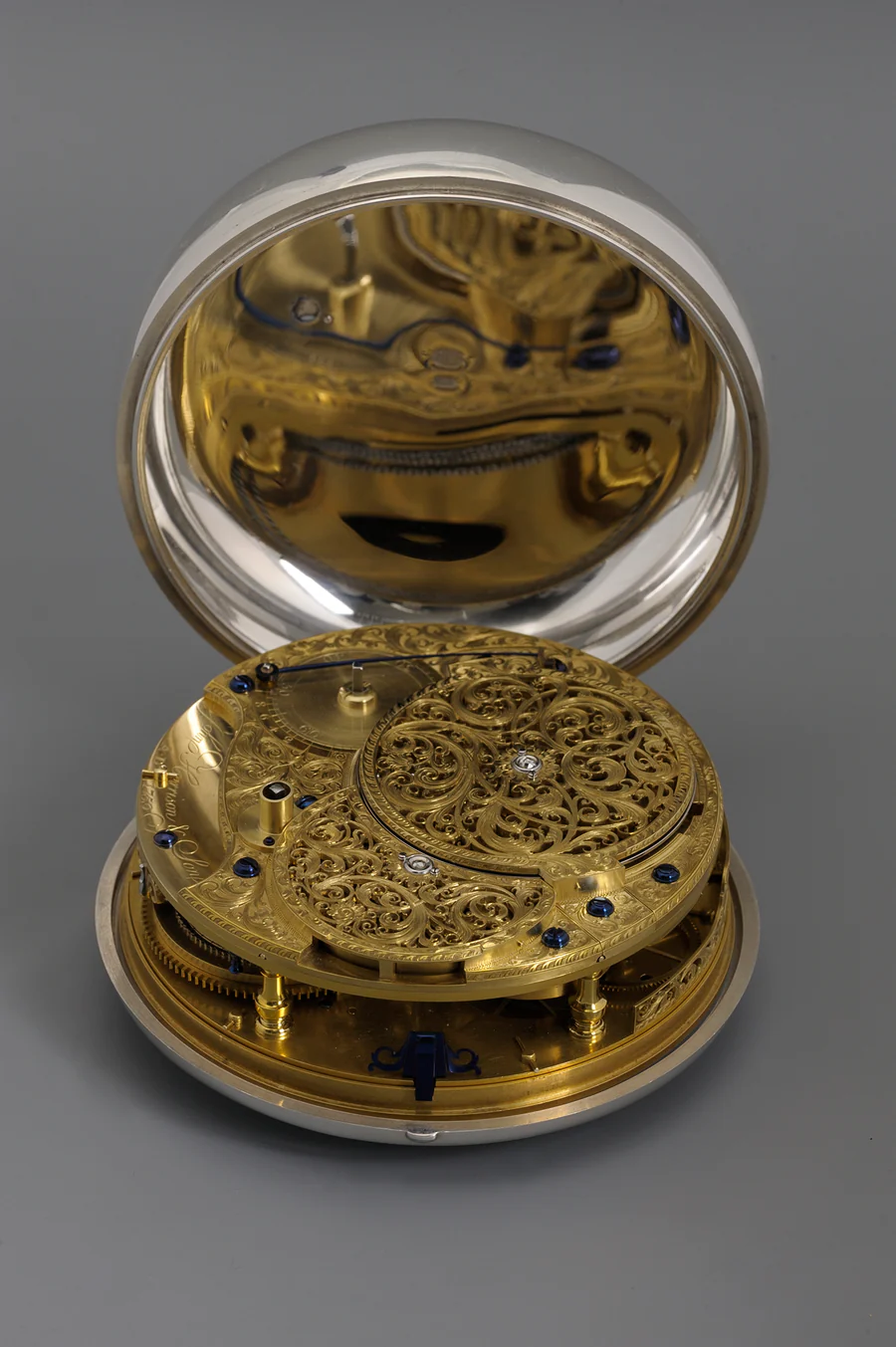
Movement of the H4 reconstruction

Pratt held John Harrison, the 18th century carpenter and horologist whose work led to the developed marine chronometer, in high regard. In the 1990s, Pratt decided to re-create Harrison's H4. The original timekeeper was completed by Harrison in 1759, and won him the Longitude reward (colloquially known as the Longitude Prize). Unlike Harrison's H1, H2 and H3 timekeepers, which are quite large clocks, H4 could be described as an oversized pocket watch.

H4's escapement used diamond pallets measuring approximately 2 mm × 1 mm × 0.4 mm. Their curved backs helped reduce the effect of changes in the size of the balance's swing on the watch's rate. Reproducing the pallets was particularly challenging, and how the originals were made remains unclear.

Pratt started work on "his H4" in 1997. He worked on it for the next 12 years, researching, planning and making the various parts. Harrison's masterpiece H4 is located at the National Maritime Museum in Greenwich, London, and was at the time under the auspices of the MoD (Ministry of Defence) Art Collection. Thanks to Jonathan Betts, the museum's Senior Horology Conservator at the time, it was possible for Pratt to gather information needed for this ambitious undertaking. Pratt's exhaustive research filled over a dozen ring binders. (Ownership of the Ministry of Defence Art Collection was transferred to museums and public bodies in 2017.)

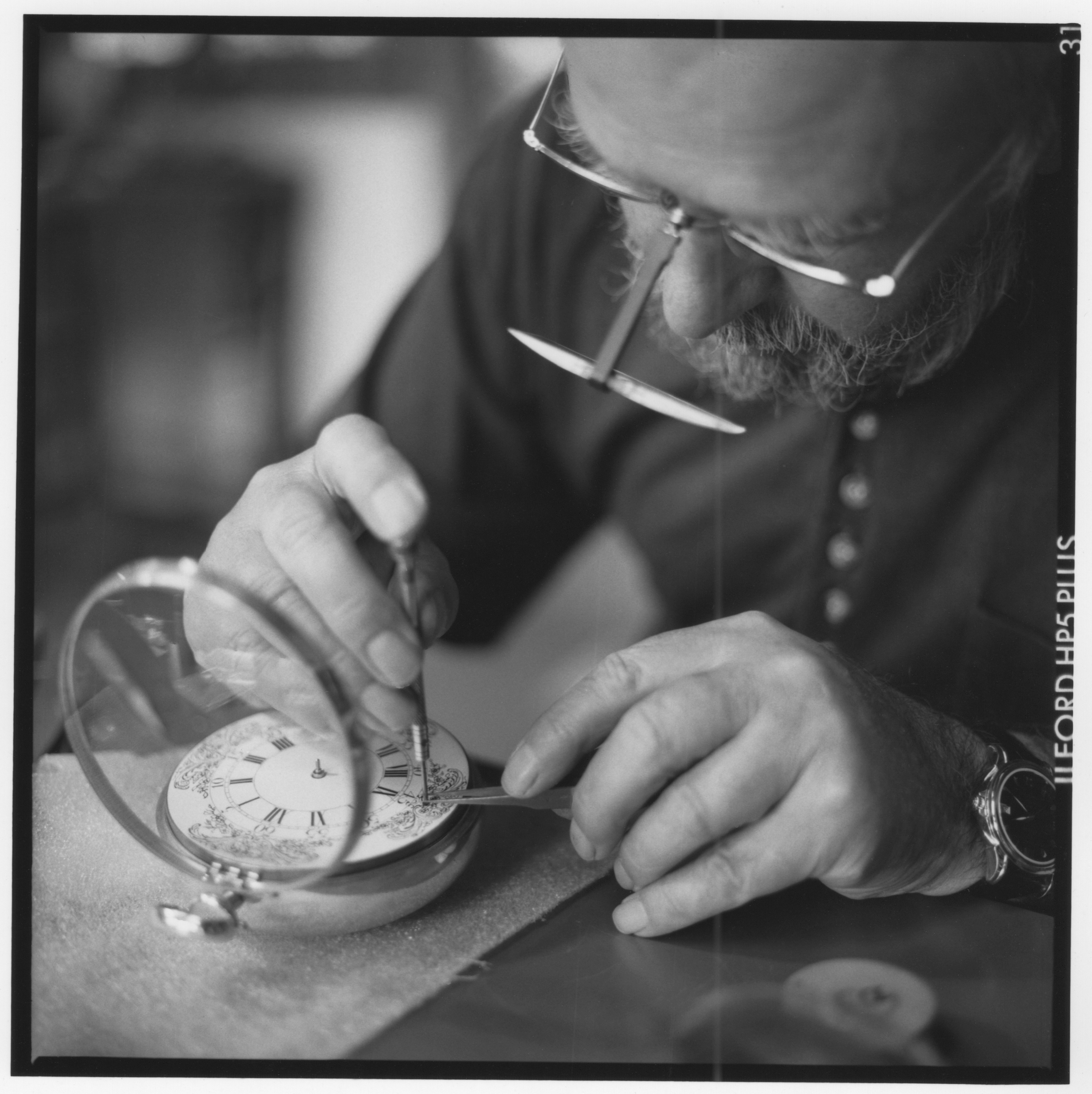
Derek Pratt working on his H4 reconstruction

For some work, Pratt commissioned specialists. The case was made by the late Martin Matthews, a fourth-generation watchcase maker. The dial was made by Jos Houbraken, an enameler in the Netherlands. Charles Scarr did the engraving.

By 2009, much of the work on the movement was done. But with Pratt's health in decline, he consulted very closely with expert watchmakers Roger Stevenson and Philip Whyte of Charles Frodsham & Co. He maintained a long-standing friendship with the Frodsham team, and frequently spent time in their workshop, discussing detent escapements for wristwatches and other horological topics.

At the Derek Pratt Memorial Seminar at Upton Hall on September 18, 2011, Whyte and Stevenson each described in detail their recollections from how Pratt approached the making of the project, and how Pratt "had always said that he didn't set out to make a copy or a replica, he decided, quite simply, 'to make another one'." (Whyte). They described Pratt's 'Work in Progress' and the many steps: the making of the silver pair cases, the enamel dial, the piercing and engraving of various parts of the movement, as well as all the research that went into it. Stevenson noted how Pratt's generous spirit paid off in that he could now lean on the generosity of others: his friend, the horologist Anthony Randall, freely shared information as well as special tools from Randall's own work on another Harrison piece.

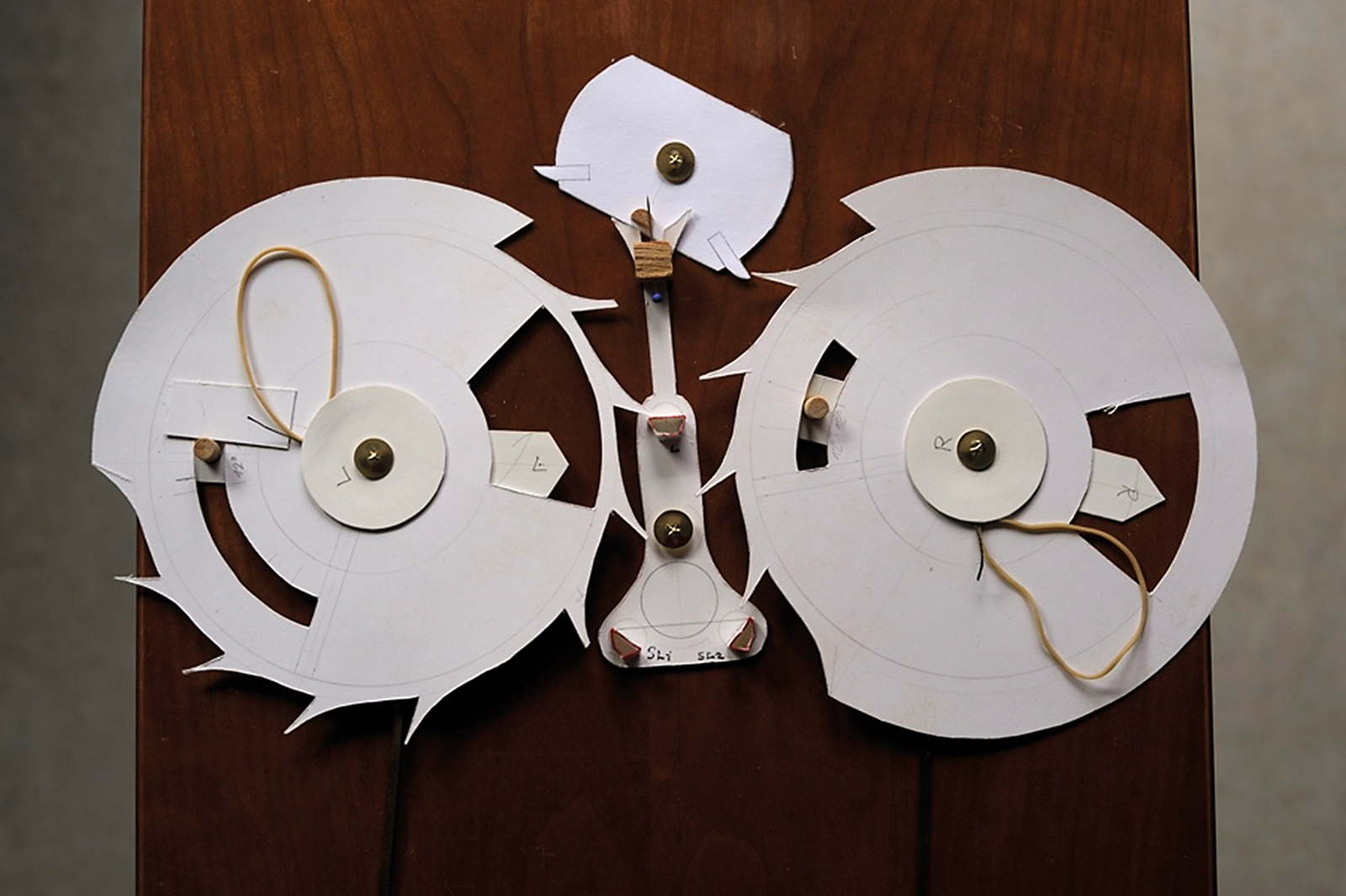
Pratt's CARD model of a double wheel remontoir escapement, made of cardboard and rubber bands.

For the completion of the project, the Frodsham team introduced SolidWorks CAD – a tool Pratt never worked with, but was still around to witness (he often joked about his system, CARD, derived from models built out of cardboard). Pratt had completed much of the work on the movement himself, but there was still work to be done. The Frodsham team completed the watch in 2014.

The Pratt-Frodsham H4 replica was exhibited as a loan alongside John Harrison's original H4 in the exhibition Ships, Clocks & Stars: The Quest for Longitude, celebrating the 300th anniversary of the Longitude Act. It was first shown at the National Maritime Museum in Greenwich, England, in 2014, and subsequently, at the Folger Shakespeare Library in Washington, DC, The Museum of America and the Sea, in Mystic Seaport, CT, and The Australian National Maritime Museum, in Sydney, Australia.

==== Water Clocks ====
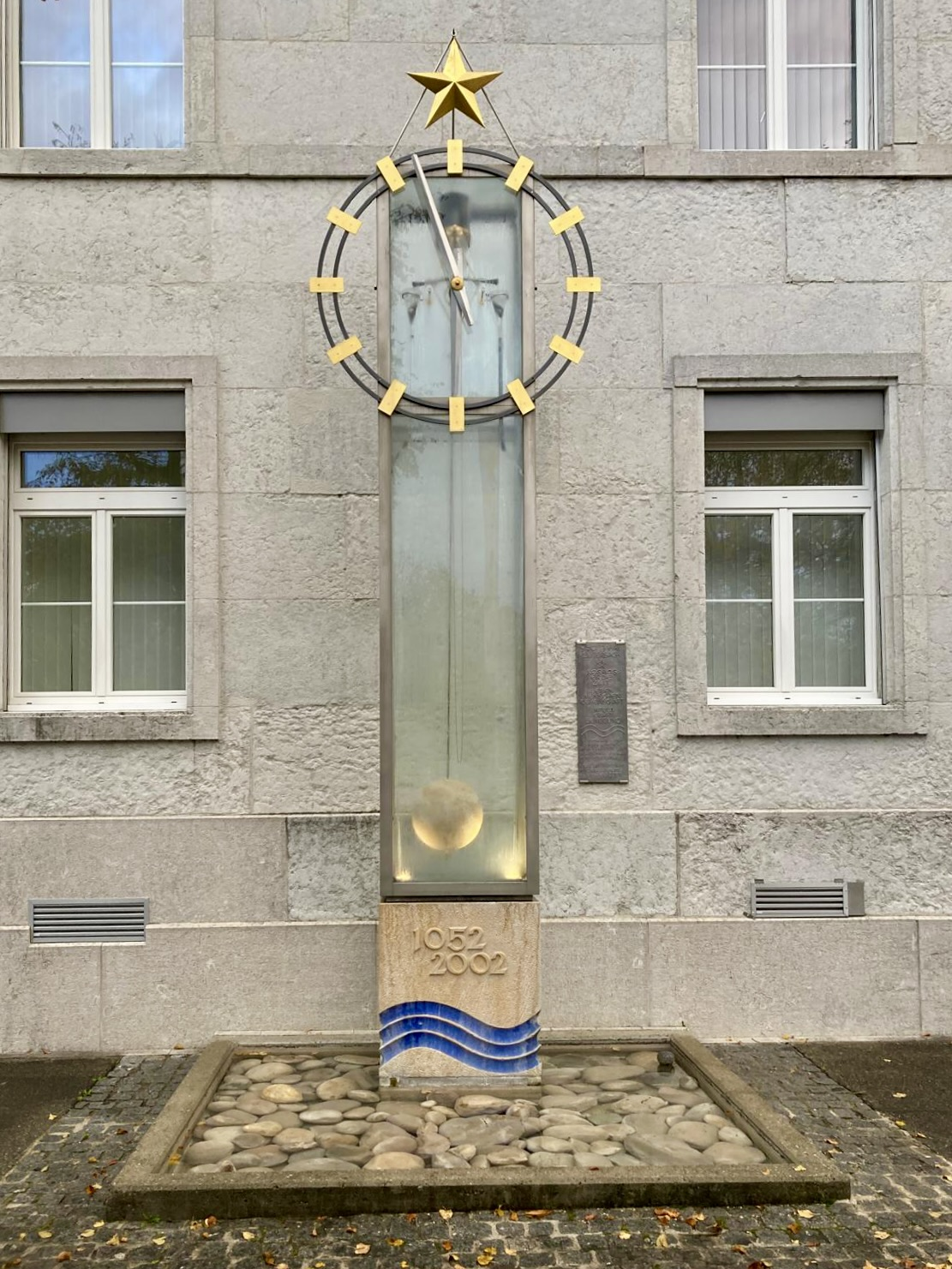
Luterbach Waterclock

Pratt also had a significant interest in water clocks. He knew of the Earl of Meath's explorations from the early 20th century. In 1995, upon seeing his childhood friend Derek Goldsmith's unfinished indoor swimming pool, he was inspired to propose a site-specific water clock. He subsequently created two more outdoor water clocks for Luterbach and Langendorf, villages near his workshop. The Luterbach clock celebrated the municipality's 950th anniversary. The Langendorf one was for the 700-year-anniversary. He detailed his process in articles in the Horological Journal. The first Pratt water clock, as a proof of concept piece, was made and installed in his workshops. It was subsequently removed and gifted by his wife to the British Horological Institute at Upton Hall, where it remains on public display.

== Personal life ==
Derek Pratt was married to the Swiss Franziska Hess whom he'd met in a pub in the UK a few months before work took him to Switzerland, from 1965 to 1985. They had two daughters. In 1988, Pratt married a fellow expat, Jenny Haller. At the time of his death she survived him, along with his daughters, his sister and a grandson.

== Personal interests ==
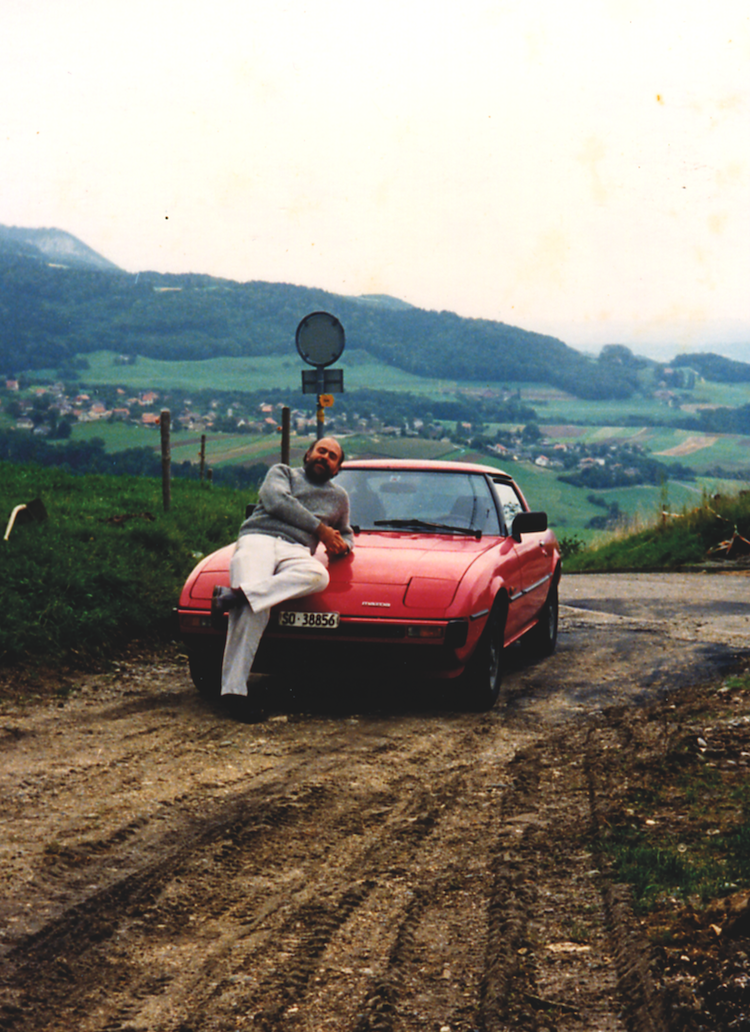
Pratt with his Wankel-engined Mazda RX-7 in Balm bei Günsberg, Switzerland

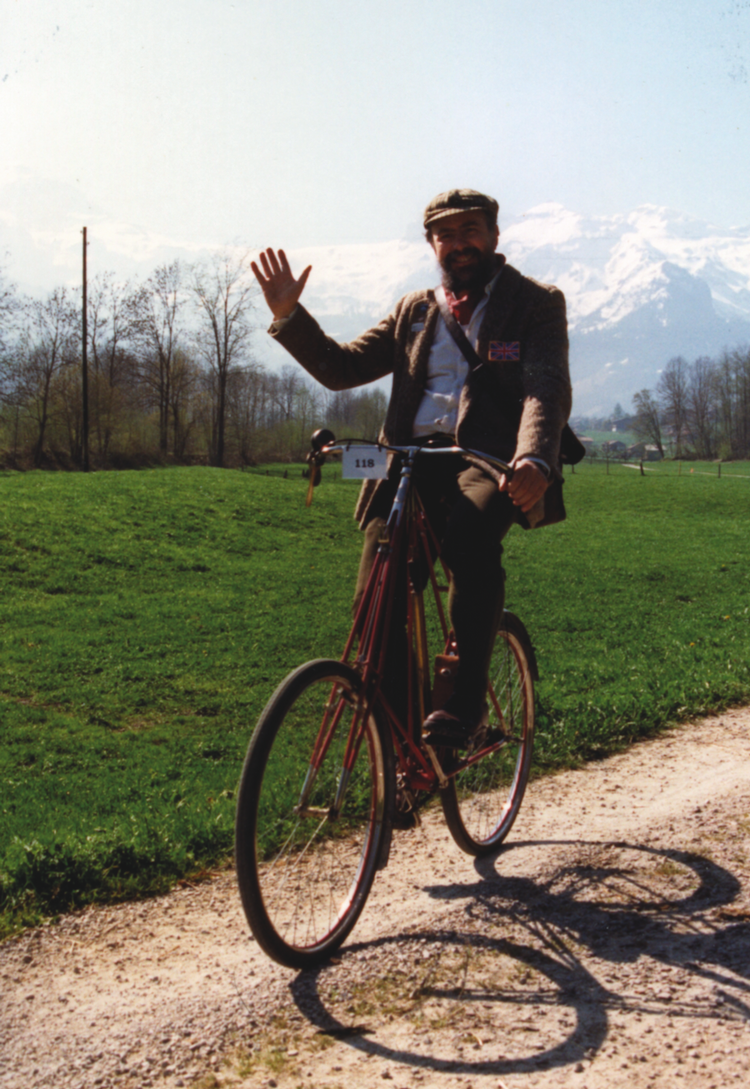
Pratt riding his Dursley Pedersen bicycle

In addition to horological heroes, Pratt also admired outliers in mechanical inventions: Franz Reuleaux, the inventor after whom the curved triangle is named. He drove a first-generation Mazda RX-7, a sportscar with a Wankel engine based on the Reuleaux triangle. The Reuleaux triangle made appearances in his watches time and again. Pratt was an avid cyclist – he considered the bicycle mankind's most important invention – and collected bicycles. His favorite was a Dursley Pedersen, a late 19th century bicycle known for its hammock-style saddle, but he also owned three ordinary bicycles (commonly known as Penny-farthings), a Swiss Army bike, and many others. Some of his other interests encompassed aviation, pop-pop boats, nature and making music.

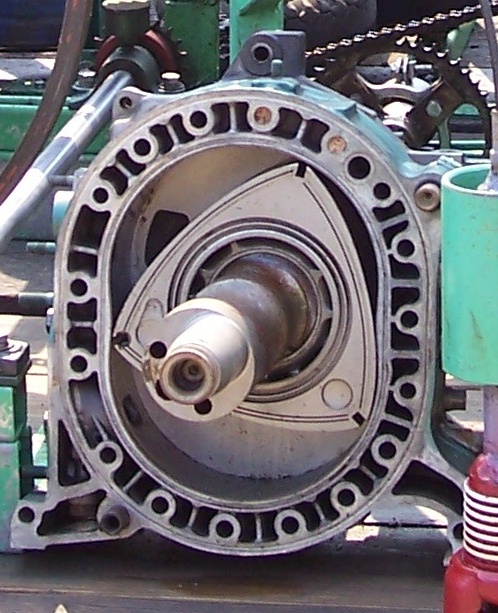
Rotor of a Wankel engine, which led to Pratt's design of his first series of remontoire-tourbillons.

== Death ==
Derek Pratt died on 16 September 2009, at the age of 71.

== Awards ==
- The British Horological Institute: Silver Medal (1992), for the "Restoration and construction of precision and complicated mechanical watches"
- Musée international d'horlogerie: Prix Gaïa (1999), "for his specialization in the repair of iron clocks and complicated watches as well as in the design of complicated pieces."
- The Worshipful Company of Clockmakers: Tompion Medal (2006), for "outstanding contributions to horology; a top class watch and clock maker; his ingenuity, technical ability and curiosity have helped to solve a variety of prototype and production problems; a supreme artist-craftsman"

== Exhibitions ==
Pratt's replica of John Harrison’s H4 timepiece was shown alongside the original at the 2014 exhibition Ships, Clocks & Stars: The Quest for Longitude, at the National Maritime Museum in Greenwich, England, presenting an account of why longitude was so important some 300 years ago. The exhibition subsequently travelled to the Folger Shakespeare Library in Washington, DC; The Museum of America and the Sea, in Mystic Seaport, CT; and The Australian National Maritime Museum, in Sydney, Australia.

== Publications ==
Between the early 1990s until 2008, Pratt published many articles in the British Horological Institute's monthly publication, the Horological Journal.

Pratt also translated several books on horology, along with his wife, Jenny Haller Pratt, for example the MIH: Catalogue d'œuvres choisies, by Catherine Cardinal and Jean-Michel Piguet.

The book Derek Pratt Watchmaker was edited by Timothy Treffry and first published in July 2012 by the British Horological Institute. It was reprinted in November 2012, August 2014, and in September 2018 in a 2nd edition. It was first published in conjunction with a Memorial Seminar held by the BHI at Upton Hall in September 2011 and contains transcripts of presentations given that day by Andrew Crisford, Jonathan Betts, Roger Stevenson, Philip Whyte, Anthony Randall, Helmut Crott and others. It also includes wide-ranging articles re-published from the Horological Journal by various authors, including Pratt.

== Documentary film ==
The two-part documentary A detailed study of H4, directed and produced by Barbara Darby, gives insight into Pratt’s journey in the reconstruction of John Harrison's Longitude timekeeper H4, including his collaboration and commissioning other craftsmen for parts such as the case (Martin Matthews) and the dial (Jos Houbraken), and subsequently, Charles Frodsham & Co.'s completion of the watch.

== Legacy ==
The Derek Pratt Prize, a £20,000 award established in 2014, recognizes individuals or organizations worldwide that demonstrate innovation, ingenuity, elegance, and the highest standards of workmanship and precision in the craft and science of timekeeping. It is intended to inspire future generations in this field and is awarded no more often than every three years. There have been three awards to date: the late Martin Burgess was the first recipient of the Derek Pratt Prize in 2014. In 2018, it went to Charles Frodsham & Co Ltd, and in 2024, to Eliott Colinge.
