= Roger W. Smith =

British independent watchmaker

Roger W. Smith, LTD.
- Company type: Private company
- Industry: Watchmaking
- Founded: 2001
- Founder: Roger W. Smith
- Headquarters: Ramsey, Isle of Man
- Products: Wristwatches
- Website: www.rwsmithwatches.com

Roger W. Smith OBE (born 1970) is a British independent watchmaker. Smith was a Bronze Medallist of the British Horological Institute (awarded to the most outstanding graduating student of any given year).

== Biography ==
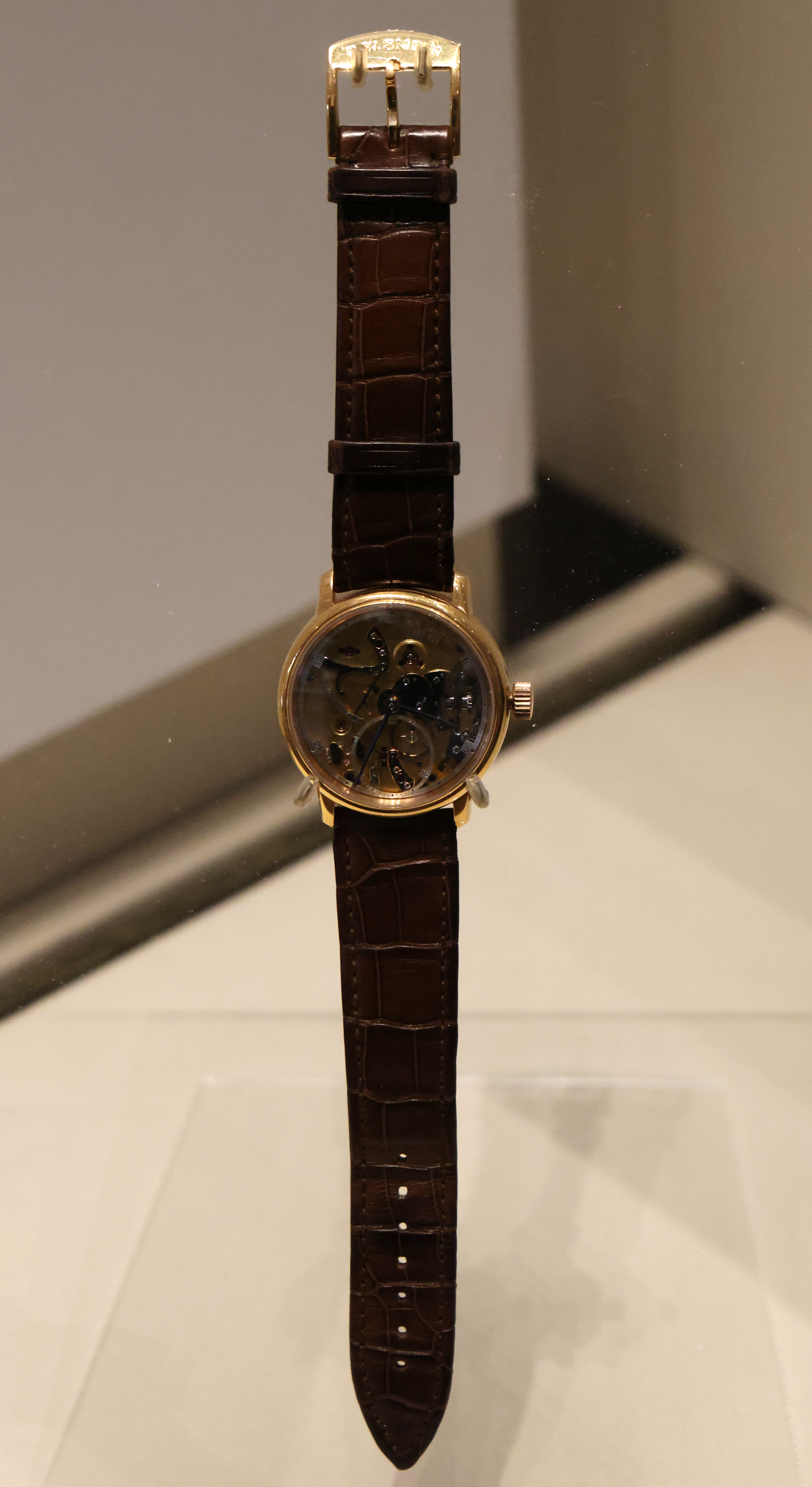
a 2008 series 2 open dial watch by Roger W. Smith

Born in Bolton near Manchester in 1970, Roger Smith grew up with little interest in academic pursuits, but he had a talent for the practical. On reaching the age of 16, his father suggested enrolling him in a course at the local Manchester School of Horology. Subsequently, he passed at the top of his class, winning the British Horological Institute’s Bronze medal, awarded for the highest overall mark of the year. During his time in the Institute, George Daniels was a visiting speaker, and from that moment Roger knew that he wanted to make watches by hand.

Smith became interested in making watches by hand. Using instructions from Daniels' book Watchmaking he set about making his first pocket watch in his spare time. In 1990, Roger, then aged 22, took the watch to Daniels, who told him to go back and start again because it looked ‘handmade’, not ‘created’. Not deterred by this response, Smith returned to his workshop, and spent the next five years making and remaking, his second pocket watch, until he had perfected all the thirty-two skills required to design and make a watch in "The Daniels Method". Upon his completion of a second watch, he took the watch back to Daniels, and this time obtained his approval. The watch was auctioned in June 2023 by Philips in New York and sold for $ 4.9m

Shortly afterwards, Daniels invited Smith to move to the Isle of Man and work with him on the ‘Daniels Millennium’ series. On completion of the series, three years later, Smith set up his own studio on the Isle of Man. He produced his ‘Series 1’, a series of 9 rectangular cased watches fitted with a retrograde calendar complication built over a period of three years. His Series 2 was launched in February 2006.

In 2010, Smith formed what would become his final collaboration with Daniels, to produce a series of 35 wristwatches to commemorate the 35th Anniversary of Daniels’ invention of the coaxial escapement, for which Daniels was appointed Commander of the Order of the British Empire (CBE) in recognition of his services to horology.

In 2011, Smith was awarded the Barrett Silver Medal of the British Horological Institute which is awarded for outstanding development or achievement in any field of horology. Smith was awarded the medal for ‘Dedication to and successfully continuing the finest traditions of English and British watchmaking’.

Upon his death in 2011, George Daniels bequeathed his entire workshop to Smith, and he noted "George’s whole studio was geared towards the singular goal of one man being able to design and make a watch from start to finish”. Incorporated within the studio are Daniels’ Schaublin Lathes and Hauser Jig Borer, used to make vital high-precision parts for the watches, which combine with the hand engine-turning equipment, dating back to the 1820s.

Smith lives with his family on the Isle of Man. In 2018 he was awarded an OBE.

== In popular culture ==
Roger has featured in the following:

- Morgan Freeman – Through the Wormhole Series; ‘The Birthplace of Time’ episode.
- Radio 4 – ‘In Business’ program with Peter Day, ‘Ticking Over’.
- Radio 4 news – Commenting on ‘What happened to the Radio 4 pips?’
- Granada ITV news – ‘The Gift for the person who has everything’
- A one-hour documentary (2015) – 'The Watchmaker's Apprentice'

He has also filmed a series of mini-films for YouTube.

== See also ==
- List of watch manufacturers
