= George Daniels (watchmaker) =

English horologist (1926–2011)

George Daniels CBE, FBHI, FSA, AHCI
- Born: 19 August 1926
- Died: 21 October 2011 (aged 85)
- Occupation: Horologist
- Known for: Coaxial escapement

George Daniels, CBE, FBHI, FSA, AHCI (19 August 1926 – 21 October 2011) was an English horologist, inventor of the coaxial escapement, author and a classic car collector.

He hand built 23 pocket watches and two wrist watches, as well as clocks. As at December 2022, only Patek Phillipe and Rolex watches have achieved higher prices. Six of his watches have each sold for in excess of USD1.5 million.

Producing a single watch and its components required 2,500 hours from Daniels, over about a year. Commentators have referred to them as 'works of art' and 'technological and horological master pieces'. Typically his watches had clear, clean dials with subsidiary dials interwoven with the main chapter ring.

He was selective about the commissions he accepted, stating "I never made watches for people if I didn't care for them."

== Early life and career ==
Daniels was born in Sunderland in 1926. His mother was unmarried so she had fled London and travelled north. After Daniels was born, he and his mother returned to London, where she married Daniels' father. In 1944, Daniels joined the army and served in the East Yorkshire Regiment; he already had an interest in watches and repaired some for other soldiers. On leaving the army in 1947, he started work at Magill's Jewellers in Edgeware as a professional watchmaker repairing watches, he also took horology night classes.

In 1960, he opened his first watch repair and cleaning shop in London. He was interested in the work of Abraham-Louis Breguet and Daniels became an expert on those watches.

In 1969, Daniels constructed his first pocket watch, for Sam Clutton, and it created interest amongst collectors. Having originally sold it for £2,000, five years later he repurchased it for £8,000. In 2012, it sold at auction for $285,000.

== Co-axial escapement ==
The co-axial escapement

Daniels accepted a commission from Seth G. Atwood to create a timepiece that would improve the performance of mechanical watches. By 1974, he had designed a new watch escapement and in 1976 incorporated it in his watch 10 as the Daniels independent double wheeled escapement. The 1980 patented development of that was the co-axial escapement used in his watch 17.

Daniels' mechanism has been described by some as the most important development in horology in the past 250 years but met little interest until Nicolas Hayek introduced an Omega automatic watch using it in 1999. It took years of presenting the invention to various brands, including Patek Philippe. Daniels' friend and peer Derek Pratt played an important role in the process.

== Later life ==
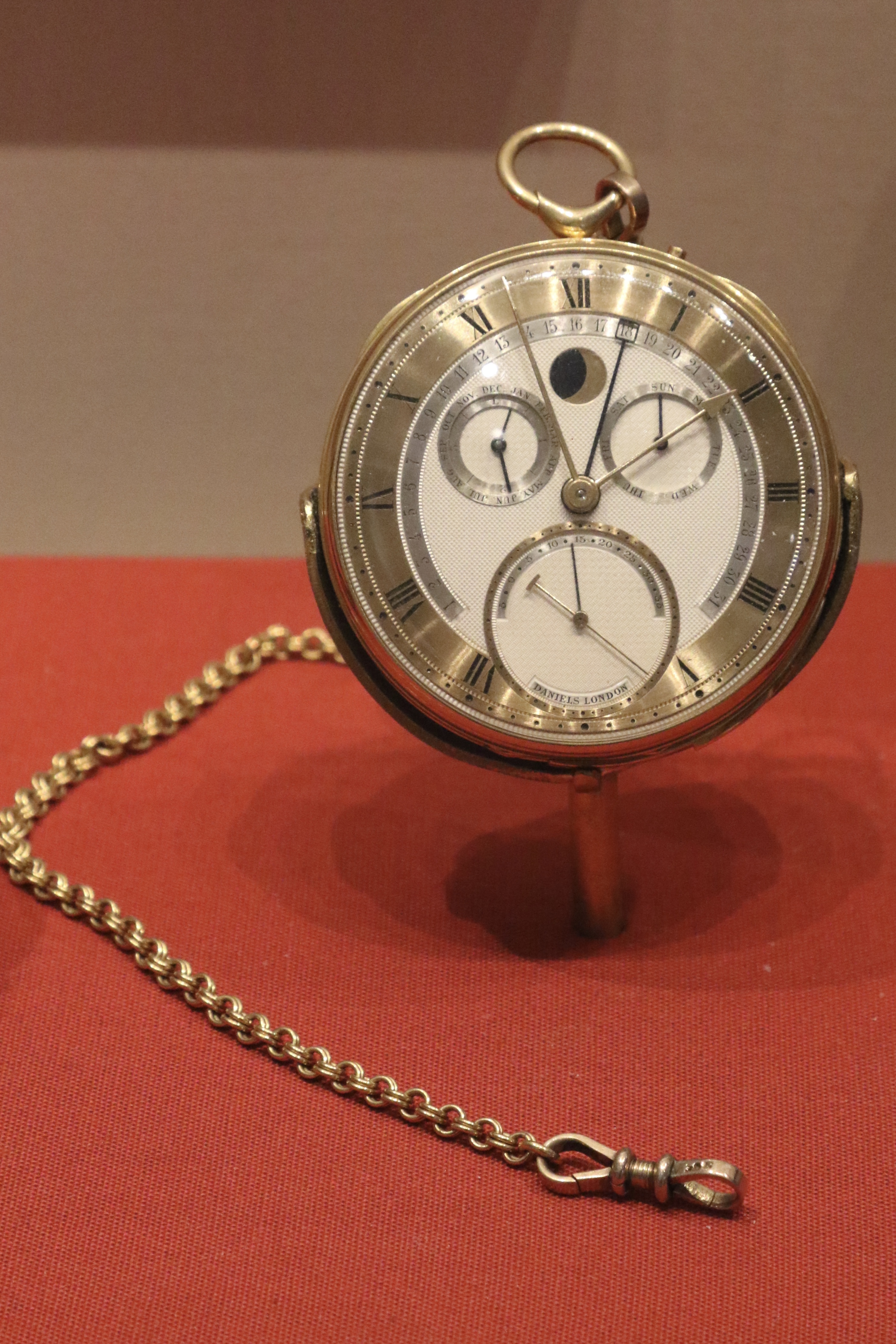
The Grand Complication watch of 1987

Daniels continued to make watches well into later life. Others were made independently, in his name, but with movements designed by Roger Smith.

== Awards and Acknowledgements ==
Daniels was a liveryman and master of the Worshipful Company of Clockmakers and received its Gold Medal. He was awarded a Gold Medal from the City of London Corporation and the Kullberg Medal from the Stockholm Watchmakers' Guild.

In 2006, Sotheby's held a retrospective exhibition of his work, including every watch Daniels had made, except one held by the British Museum.

- MBE then in 2010, CBE.
- Honorary Doctor of Science City University London
- Fellow of the Society of Antiquaries of London
- Honorary Fellow of the City and Guilds Institute
- Fellow and President of the British Horological Institute
- Honorary Fellow of the American Watchmakers-Clockmakers Institute
- British Horological Institute Gold Medal
- City and Guilds of London Institute Gold Medal and Insignia Award
- International Museum of Horology Prix Gaïa
- A blue plaque commemorates his time living in Penge.

== Personal life and educational trust ==
He married, in 1964, Juliet Marryat, with whom he had a daughter, Sarah Jane Daniels. The marriage was later dissolved. He was the uncle of philosopher Stephen Neale. Daniels died on 21 October 2011.

In 2012, part of Daniels' collection, including some pieces he made, was sold by Sotheby's in a 134-lot sale. The auction raised over £8 million for the George Daniels Educational Trust, which helps students seeking higher education in the fields of horology, engineering, medicine or construction.

== Cars ==
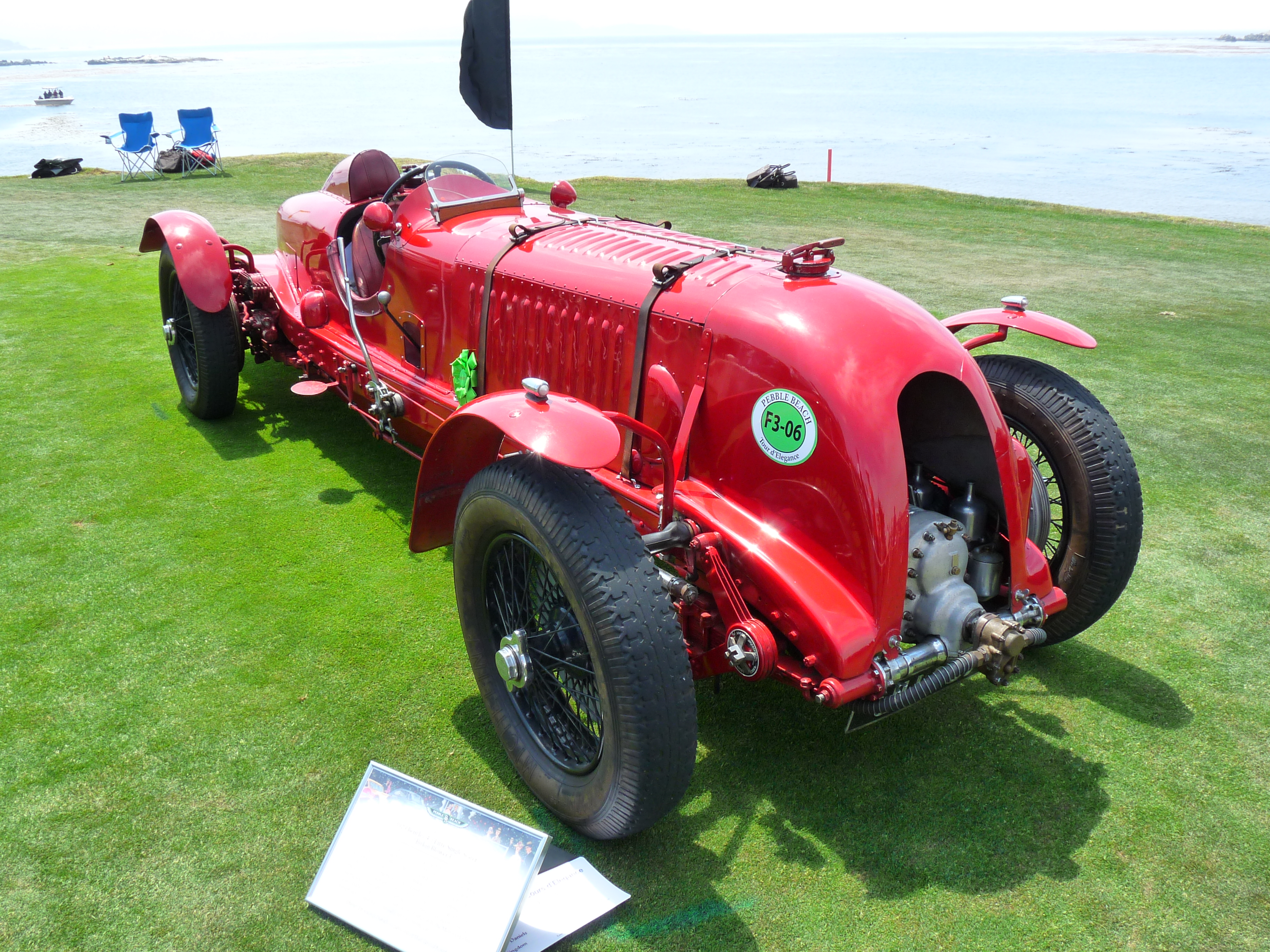
Daniels' Bentley Blower No.1

Daniels' classic car collection included:

- 1924 Landaulette 3 litre Bentley
- 1962 Triumph TR3A
- 1908 Single Cylinder De Dion-Bouton engined Jackson
- 1932 MG J2
- 1908 Itala Grand Prix winning car
- 1954 Bentley R Type Continental fastback
- 1929 Bentley Vanden Plas four seat tourer formerly owned by the Maharaja of Bhavnagar
- 1907 Daimler Type 45
- 1929–32 Bentley Blower No.1
- 1932 Alfa Romeo 8C 2300
- 1974 Jaguar E-Type Series III roadster
- 1934 Rolls-Royce Phantom II
- 1989 Bentley Turbo R

== Publications ==
Daniels' publications include:-

- Clutton, Cecil; Daniels, George (1965). Watches. London: B. T. Batsford. ISBN 978-0670750764.
- Daniels, George (1966). English and American Watches.
- Daniels, George (1974). The Art of Breguet. London: Sotheby Parke Bernet. ISBN 0-85667-004-9.
- Clutton, Cecil; Daniels, George (1975). Clocks & Watches in the Collection of the Worshipful Company of Clockmakers. London: Sotheby Parke Bernet. ISBN 0-85667-019-7.
- Daniels, George; Markarian, Ohannes (1980). Watches & Clocks in the David Solomons Collection. London: Sotheby Parke Bernet. ISBN 085667074X.
- Daniels, George (1981). Watchmaking. London: Sotheby's. ISBN 0-85667-150-9.
- Daniels, George (2010). The Practical Watch Escapement. Isle of Man: Philip Wilson. ISBN 978-0-85667-687-1.
- Daniels, George (2000). "All in Good Time: Reflections of a Watchmaker" (3rd ed.). London: Philip Wilson (published 2013). ISBN 978-0-85667-680-2.
