= Derek Pratt (cricketer) =

English cricketer

Personal information
- Full name: Derek Edward Pratt
- Born: 31 October 1925; Balham, London, England
- Died: 10 January 1997 (aged 71); Banstead, Surrey, England
- Batting: Right-handed
- Bowling: Leg break
- Relatives: Ron Pratt (brother)

Domestic team information
- Years: Team
- 1958–1963: Bedfordshire
- 1954–1957: Surrey

Career statistics
Competition	First-class
Matches	9
Runs scored	171
Batting average	21.37
100s/50s	–/–
Top score	33
Balls bowled	765
Wickets	13
Bowling average	30.15
5 wickets in innings	1
10 wickets in match	–
Best bowling	6/119
Catches/stumpings	4/–
- Source: Cricinfo, 27 August 2012

Derek Edward Pratt (31 October 1925 – 10 January 1997) was an English cricketer. Pratt was a right-handed batsman who bowled leg break. He was born at Balham, London.

Pratt made his first-class debut for Surrey against Cambridge University in 1954 at Fenner's. He made eight further first-class appearances for Surrey, the last of which came against Oxford University in 1957. In his nine first-class appearances for Surrey, he scored 171 runs at an average of 21.37, with a high score of 33. With the ball, he took 13 wickets at a bowling average of 30.15, with best figures of 6/119. These figures represented his only five wicket haul and came against the Combined Services in 1956 at The Oval. He joined Bedfordshire in 1958, making his debut for the county against Cambridgeshire in the Minor Counties Championship. He played minor counties cricket for Bedfordshire from 1958 to 1963, making a total of 35 appearances, the last of which came against Staffordshire.

He died at Banstead, Surrey, on 10 January 1997. His brother, Ronald, also played first-class cricket.
