= Seth G. Atwood =

American industrialist, leader and horological collector (1917–2010)

- Born: 2 June 1917; Rockford, Illinois, U.S.
- Died: 21 February 2010 (aged 92); Rockford, Illinois, U.S.
- Education: Carleton College; Stanford University (B.A); University of Wisconsin, Madison; Harvard University (M.B.A)
- Occupations: Industrialist, collector
- Known for: Atwood Vacuum Machine Company; Time Museum

Seth Glanville Atwood (June 2, 1917 – February 21, 2010) was an American industrialist, community leader, and horological collector. He was the chairman and president of Atwood Vacuum Machine Company, one of the world's largest manufacturers of automobile body hardware, and a long-time leader of the Atwood family's business which involved in manufacturing, banking and hotel industries, with over 2,500 employees. In addition, Atwood was a director of the Illinois Manufacturers' Association, and had served in the Illinois Chamber of Commerce and the Graduate School of Business at the University of Chicago.

In 1971, Seth G. Atwood founded the Time Museum at the Clock Tower Resort in Rockford, Illinois, which later became one of the leading horological museums in the world with nearly 1,500 pieces of horological collection, including atomic clocks. The museum's notable collection included ancient Chinese sundials and water clocks, early pendulum clocks, a quarter-repeater by Thomas Tompion, Breguet Sympathique Clocks, and the Patek Philippe Henry Graves Supercomplication which currently holds the title of the most expensive watch ever sold at auction, fetching 24 million US dollars (23,237,000 CHF) in Geneva on November 11, 2014. However, the museum was shut down in 1999 and its collection was sent to auctions over the years.

== Early life ==
Seth G. Atwood was born in Rockford, Illinois on June 2, 1917. He attended Carleton College, and graduated from Stanford University with a B.A. degree in 1938. He later studied at the University of Wisconsin for a year, and obtained an M.B.A. from Harvard University in 1940. From 1942 to 1946, he served as an officer in the United States Navy, achieving the rank of lieutenant commander.

Seth G. Atwood later returned to Rockford and joined in the Atwood Vacuum Machine Company, which was founded by his father, Seth B. Atwood, and his uncle, James T. Atwood in 1909 specializing in manufacturing vacuum cleaners.

== Family business ==
By 1920, the Atwood Vacuum Machine Company had already shifted its focus from manufacturing vacuum cleaners to door silencers for cars. Eventually, the company began to manufacture a complete line of automobile body hardware. Seth G. Atwood became the president of the Atwood Vacuum Machine Company in 1953 when his father became chairman of the board.

In 1967, Seth G. Atwood became the chairman of the company, and under his leadership the company became the world's "largest independent manufacturer of internal auto body hardware" in 1968. In 1970, the company re-organized and established the Automotive and Contract Division and the Mobile Products Division, employing over 2,500 employees with five plants in Canada and the United States. In 1971, the annual sale of the company reached around US$50 million. In 1985, Atwood Vacuum Machine was sold to Anderson Industries in Rockford, Illinois; the annual sale of the company was US$138 million at the time of this acquisition.

Seth G. Atwood also managed other businesses of his family involving banking, venture capital, hotels and real estate properties.

== Timepiece collection ==
=== Time Museum ===
In 1971, Seth G. Atwood founded the Time Museum at the Clock Tower Resort in Rockford, Illinois. The resort was originally built by the Atwood's family in 1968. In 1980s, the museum became one of the leading horological museums in the world, with nearly 1,500 pieces of horological collection, including atomic clocks. The museum's notable collection included ancient Chinese sundials and water clocks by Su Song, early pendulum clocks, a quarter-repeater by Thomas Tompion, an astronomical and world time clock by Christian Gebhard, the Harrison wooden regulator clock, the Richard Glynn mechanical equinoctial standing Ring-Dial, and so on. In 1990s, the museum attracted over 50,000 visitors each year.

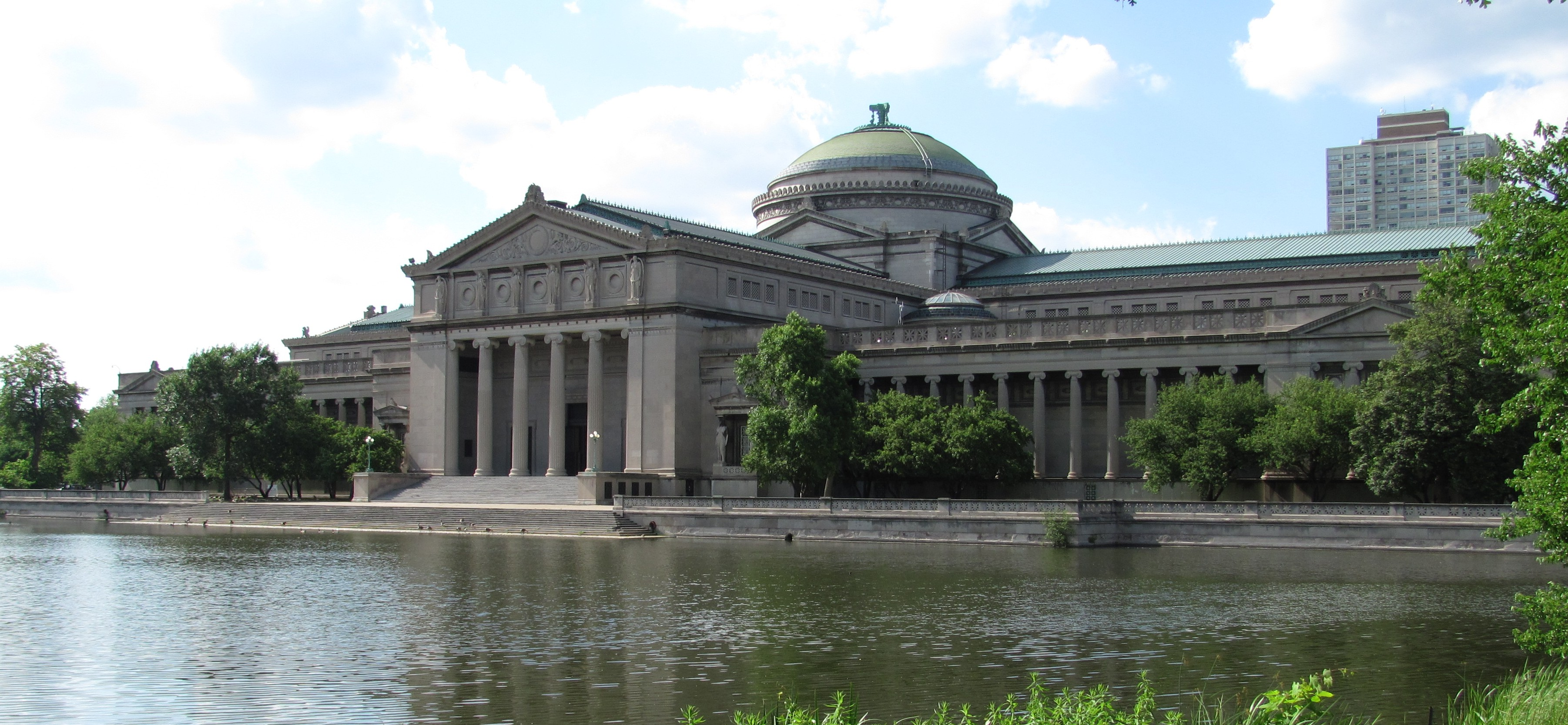
The Museum of Science and Industry in Chicago kept and displayed a large portion of the original collection from the Time Museum until February 2004.

However, the museum was shut down in March 1999 when United Realty Corp., a company owned by Atwood family interests, sold the Clock Tower Resort to Regency Hotel Management. As a result, the majority of the museum's collection went to the Museum of Science and Industry in Chicago, and was on display from January 2001 to February 2004. In 2004, a campaign to raise US$35 million to buy the collection for Time Museum failed, and the collection was broken up with its timepieces sent to auctions.

Over the years, hundreds of items from the museum's original collection went up for sale in Sotheby's auctions, and several pieces became the world's most expensive watches and clocks ever auctioned. These included the Patek Philippe Henry Graves Supercomplication and the Breguet Sympathique Clock No.128 & 5009 (Duc d'Orléans Breguet Sympathique, owned by Ferdinand Philippe, Duke of Orléans), which was originally restored by English watchmaker George Daniels at the request of Seth G. Atwood. The Patek Philippe pocket watch currently holds the title of the most expensive watch ever sold at auction, fetching US$24 million US dollars (CHF 23,237,000) in Sotheby's Geneva auction on November 11, 2014. The Breguet Sympathique Clock, on the other hand, currently ranks as one of the most expensive clocks ever sold at auction, fetching US$6.80 million in Sotheby's New York auction on December 4, 2012.

=== Coaxial escapement ===
During the quartz crisis in 1970s, Seth G. Atwood commissioned a mechanical timepiece from English watchmaker George Daniels to fundamentally improve the performance of mechanical watches. As a result, Daniels invented the revolutionary coaxial escapement in 1974 and patented it in 1980. The Atwood watch for Seth G. Atwood was completed in 1976.

The coaxial escapement was later used in the watches of watch manufacturers such as Omega SA.

== See also ==
- Patek Philippe Henry Graves Supercomplication
- Coaxial escapement
