= Echappement naturel =

Type of escapement in mechanical watch movements

The échappement naturel was the invention of Abraham-Louis Breguet, one of the most eminent watchmakers of all time. Following the introduction of the detent chronometer escapement with a temperature compensated balance, very close rates could be achieved in marine chronometers and to a lesser degree in pocket chronometers. This achievement was due, other things being equal, to the minimal interference with the balance during unlocking and impulse. A further key advantage of this escapement was that there was no need for oil on the escapement's working surfaces and hence no deterioration in the friction between the working surfaces as the oil aged. A drawback was that the detent escapement as it was used in pocket chronometers was prone to stopping as a result of motion. Most escapements are capable of being stopped by a sudden movement but the detent escapement gives an impulse to the balance only when it is moving in one direction. The escapement is therefore not self-starting. The lever escapement, as used in most modern mechanical watches, avoided this problem. In common with most other escapements it gave an impulse to the balance in both directions of the balance swing. This creates another problem in doing so because the introduction of a lever between the balance and the final (escape) wheel of the escapement requires lubrication on the acting surfaces.

== Breguet's invention ==
Breguet realised that this problem (more serious at the time because of the rather poorer oils then available) could be removed and many of the advantages of the detent escapement retained if an impulse were given in both directions of the balance. In order to do this he geared two escape wheels together, one escape wheel driven by the fourth wheel of the wheel train, which in turn was geared to and drives a second escape wheel. A pivoted detent swings freely between them and locks each escape wheel in turn on a coaxial set of locking teeth.

== How it works ==
Photographs of the escapement from above and below in the prototype watch and a diagram of the important features are shown in the figures.

Echappement naturel from watch 1135 - top view

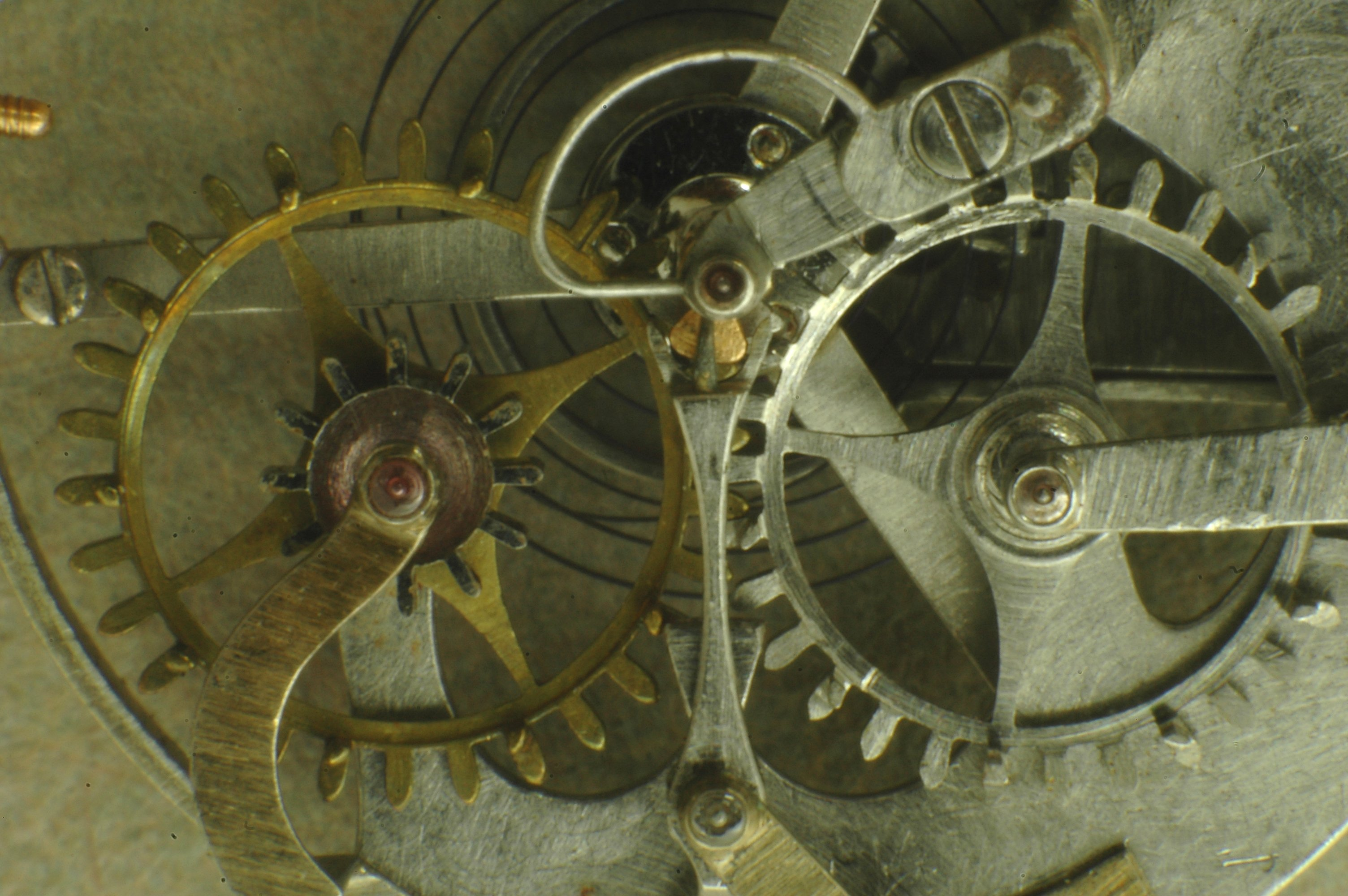
Echappement naturel from watch 1135 - bottom view

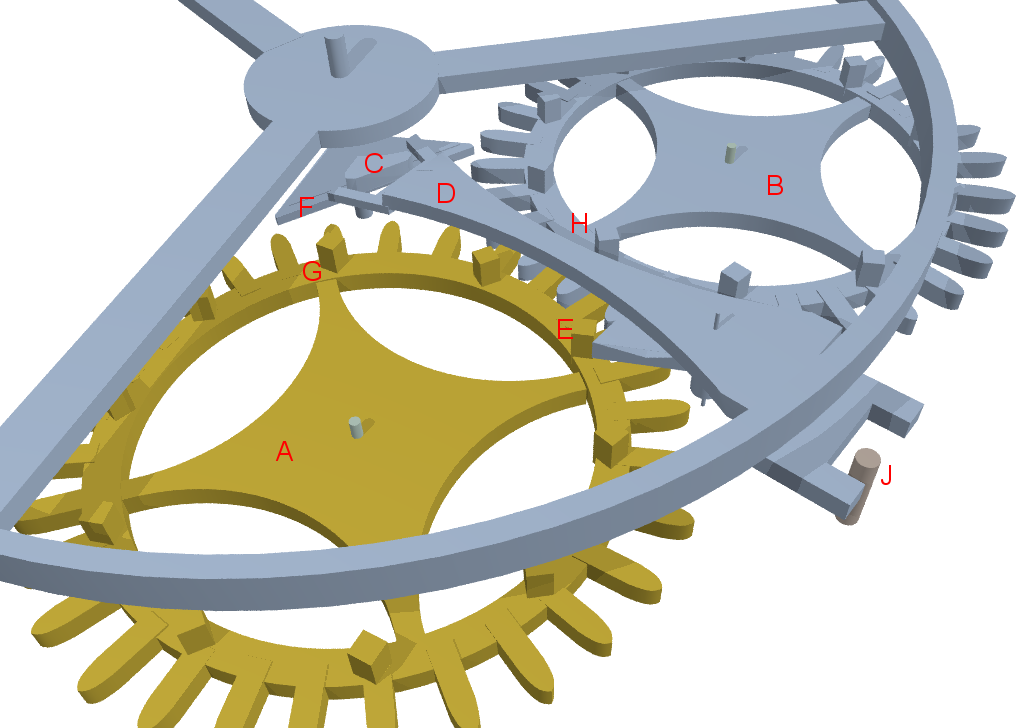
Diagram of échappement naturel

As the two escape wheels A and B rotate meshed together, one of them is locked when an impulse/locking tooth, standing upright from the escape wheel, rests on the wide straight locking stone of the detent. In the figure the balance is rotating counter-clockwise and just at the point that the unlocking pallet C on the balance is about to move the detent D to release peg E on escape wheel A which is resting on the jewelled locking surface underneath the detent arm. The impulse pallet F mounted on the balance staff just below the unlocking pallet C will have moved in front of peg G whilst the balance completes its unlocking arc. When the peg E is released by the detent, the escape wheels accelerate together and peg G will deliver an impulse on the jewelled rear face of impulse pallet F. After the impulse arc, tooth H from the escape wheel B locks on the other end of the detent locking jewel which has now been moved into its path. The depth of locking is limited by a banking pin J.

As pointed out by George Daniels, it is possible to jam the escapement when the main spring is wound down and Breguet introduced spring loading of the detent in the later versions of this escapement so that such jamming would not damage the escapement.

Another later refinement added by Breguet was the reduction in size of the second (driven) escape wheel. He found that it did not need to be of the same size as the first wheel, only that the diameter of the wheel should be in proportion to the number of impulse teeth. Reducing the size of the driven wheel had the advantage that its inertia was smaller. This development was used in all of the second group of watches listed below, the tourbillon series.

== Known watches with the escapement ==
Only about 20 watches were made by Breguet with this escapement, of the roughly 4200 separate watches (some watches were bought back and sold under a new number) made in his main series. Approximately 75% of them survive and either exist in known collections or have passed through the main auction houses in recent years.

The watches divide into two groups.

The first group contains four watches which were made as part of the development of the escapement. Each watch in this group is different and each watch is part of a linear development of the escapement from the first watch, started in 1802, to the last started in 1806. The four watches seem to be of two types. The first two watches share the features of both being small, having the rarer gold dials and apparently were planned to have new escapement at the outset. The second two watches were of the usual size for men's watches, they had the more normal silver and enamel dials and it would appear that neither was initially planned to contain the new escapement but were taken from stock and upgraded. They also show some of the improvements in design that led to the final use of the escapement in a series of tourbillon garde-temps made after 1808. For example, the driven escape wheels are smaller than the drivers and a sprung setting for the detent is introduced.

The second group contains watches in which the escapement was used in its final form, all of them mounted on tourbillon platforms. They all possess the escapement in its final form that was used by Breguet from 1808 until the 1822, the year before he died. His death brought this series of watches to an end.

=== Watch group 1 ===
==== Number 1135 ====
The ébauche was made by Bérare and delivered on 9 June 1802 to Breguet's design. The case was made by Pierre-Benjamin Tavernier and delivered on 12 August 1802. Charles Bernaudat made the first attempt at the escapement and delivered it in March 1803. Bernaudat altered some aspect of the escapement in April 1804 involving a stone in the escapement, either the locking pallet on the detent or the impulse pallet on the balance. Then Bernaudat made two final alterations to the escapement in September and December 1805. The payments for this work on the escapement, totalling about 1900 Francs (although this includes a payment for 'repassage', probably about 300 Fr) should be compared with the sale price at the time of one of Breguet's gold repeaters, about 1500 Francs. The work on the escapement in December 1805 was presumably the final modification since the watch was delivered to the Duke of Infantado in January 1806 for the price of 4000 Francs and the Breguet firm did not see the watch again for 32 years.

This was the first example of the échappement naturel and was constructed with the escapement on a detachable platform. Breguet used this arrangement in many of his marine chronometers so that his best escapement makers could perform the delicate construction and adjustments more easily. For this watch, the two escape wheels were of the same size, each having 10 impulse teeth arranged as pegs standing up from the rims of the wheels.

==== Number 1711 ====
In contrast with the drawn out construction of 1135, this watch was produced quite quickly. The ébauche was made by Benoit and delivered in November 1804, Tavernier supplied the case in December 1804, Kehlhoff the escapement on 26 December 1804 and its repassage was completed by Bernaudat on 12 Feb 1805. There was now a delay of several months during which the final work was done on the dial and hands before being delivered to the buyer M. Galakoff on 5 September 1805 for the price of 3360 Francs. Mr. Galakoff had some problems with it, there were a couple of jobs done to it in the first few weeks, for example a new front crystal. Breguet bought the watch back from Mr. Galakoff in May 1806, had Tavernier engine-turn the back and re-numbered it as 2099 before selling it to M. Castaneda, an agent for the Spanish royal family, on 14 June 1806. The dates of the changes to the escapement of watch 1135 and the dates of construction of the escapement for watch 1711 overlap. It is therefore possible that lessons learned from the construction of watch 1135 were incorporated in 1711 and perhaps vice versa. In this watch the driven escape wheel was smaller, presumably because Breguet had come to the view that this was beneficial. George Daniels pointed out that this reduction of the size and inertia of the driven wheel resulted in improved escapement performance. It was obviously not thought at the time to be beneficial enough to delay 1135 and redesign its escapement and train although the final escapement work was done after that of 1711. In this watch the driving escape wheel had 5 impulse teeth and the driven had 4. This was a relatively minor development from the design used in watch 1135.

==== Number 1085 ====
The ébauche for this watch was originally supplied by Bérare in April 1802, a date consistent with its number. It then lay unused until Lapieur started construction of an échappement naturel in April 1805, completing it at the end of February 1806. It was cased by Tavernier by 8 April 1806 and Sagedieu performed the repassage between the end of May and mid-September of that year. The last entry in the workshop records is for 21 October 1806 when a minute hand was supplied but then it lay in the shop until consigned to its buyer Mr. Fenier of Moscow on 16 May 1808 for the price of 2640 Francs. The watch was re-purchased from Wenham, one of Breguet's agents, some time prior to 1821 and it was re-numbered as 2995 and traded (‘troc pour troc dire 3600 Francs’) for watch 1485 from a Mr. Rowse on 18 August 1821. Mr. Rowse was notionally allowed 3000 Francs for his watch, more than its sale price in 1806. In this watch the driving escape wheel had 8 impulse teeth and the driven had 4. The detent locking was also mounted on springs for the first time in order to protect against the escapement locking when the mainspring was run down.

==== Number 1484 ====
The last of the four watches, 1484, does not now possess an échappement naturel but a double-wheel Robin escapement, a hybrid of the lever escapement and the chronometer escapement. Work started on the watch prior to September 1803. Sagedieu worked on an unspecified escapement between 10 February and 27 July 1804. Not much happened to the watch for six months except some jewel holes from Hooker, Breguet's jewel specialist brought from London. Lapieur then worked on an échappement naturel between the end of January and early May 1806. From the position of the original pivot hole for the second escape wheel, the two escape wheels appear to have had a 2:1 ratio of their size. The most likely tooth counts appear to be 8:4, the same as Lapieur made earlier for watch 1085 above. The watch was cased by Tavernier in June and Herault completed the repassage in August. In November 1806, Bernaudat was paid 300 Francs for 'ouvrage et visitage'. This considerable sum could have been for the removal of the échappement naturel and the construction of its current coaxial double-wheel Robin escapement. Nothing much happened again until mid-October 1808 when Bernaudat was paid another 60 Fr for changes to the escapement. At some stage the stop-work was replaced in a new sink in the barrel cap with a standard Geneva variety rather than Breguet's own design. No more work was done on the watch and another year and a half passed before it was sold to General Labadie on 28 Mar 1810 for the price of 1800 Francs.

Breguet used Robin escapements in a number of carriage and chamber clocks, at least one marine chronometer and more than a dozen watches between 1807 and 1823, mostly between 1807 and 1815. The series included a group of consecutively numbered minute repeating perpetuelles delivered between 1812 and 1816 and at least one tourbillon, number 1297 delivered in 1808. As Daniels pointed out, the double lift Robin escapement suffered from a serious fault as a precision escapement. The necessity for oil on the lever impulse surface resulted in oil being transferred, via the escape wheel teeth, to the direct impulse pin on the balance for the alternative impulse. Some watches and carriage clocks had two separate coaxial escape wheels to keep the oil away from the balance impulse (as in 2179) but the Robin escapement was not apparently developed further after the échappement naturel for serious precision timekeeping in watches, except by Daniels himself in making the crucial developments that totally separate the functions of impulse and locking now used by Omega in his coaxial escapement.

==== Number 2179 ====
A fifth watch could have been made during the development period for the échappement naturel. Watch number 2179 is a gold repeating watch of ‘normal’ size and is described on a Breguet certificate from 1971 as having an échappement naturel . However, it was catalogued for a sale in 2002 of items from the Time Museum by Anthony Randall as having a double lift Robin escapement. It is quite probable that work was started on this watch with a view to it having an échappement naturel but, like watch 1484, it was completed and taken into stock with a Robin escapement. Photocopies of the workbook entry accompanying the sale of the watch stated that its construction was started in 1806, after the delivery of both watch 1135 and watch 1711. It was sold on 29 December 1823 to the Duchess of Dalmatia for the price of 3200 Francs.

=== Watch group 2 ===
In the period 1808-1822 almost all watches using the échappement naturel were constructed on 4-minute tourbillon carriages, with 12+3 escape teeth, reversed fusees and sprung detent locking and were made to a similar pattern. The watches were large, typically 60-65mm in diameter and a distinguishing feature was their dials. These nearly all had a short hour hand indicating on a small central chapter ring and a large minute hand with a minute ring at the edge of the dial, see watches 1187 and 1188 in Daniels. It is possible that the low price for the watch for the Bishop of Cambrai was because of their personal friendship. Judging by the rather modest mark-up of ~25% that Breguet applied to his workshop costs for other watches with this escapement, he might even have made a loss in this case. Breguet sold the Bishop another tourbillon watch, number 2436, for the same price but this one had a constant force escapement. During the period in which these watches were being sold (1808–1821), a few dozen tourbillon watches were being produced, about half with a lever escapement on a 1-minute carriage and the rest with a variety of escapements, a detent escapement on a 6-minute or 4-minute carriage, a couple with a constant force escapement and at least one with a Robin escapement. The sale of watches with tourbillon movements ceased after Breguet's death in 1823.

Group 2 watches
Number	Size (mm)	Case /Dial	Date Delivered	Buyer	Price (Francs)
1175 (later 2980)	62	Gold/ Gold	28 June 1818	M. Wenham	3760
1176	65	Gold/ Gold	12 February 1809	Count Potocki	4600
1187	65	Silver/ Silver	13 April 1810	'Russian Firm'	3000
1188	65	Gold/ Enamel	1 August 1808	Don Antonio of Spain	3600
1890	65	Gold/ Gold	16 May 1809	Count Razzoumofski	3240
1918	65	Gold/ Silver	13 February 1822	Count d'Archinto	4640
2180	64	Gold/ Silver	14 March 1815	Chevalier de Brito	3000
2483	60	Gold/ Silver	10 November 1819	Bishop of Cambrai	2000

== Other examples ==
Breguet used the escapement in a few clocks although the escapement's self-starting ability is less of an advantage. Two carriage clocks are known, number 2516 sold in 1811 and number 262 sold in 1826. He also used it in a compteur militaire (number 1638 sold in 1814), a specialised watch used to regulate marching. The ability to sustain rough handling would have been more of an advantage for this but the potential for highly accurate timekeeping would appear to make this refinement redundant. Finally, he made two marine chronometers with the escapement with the added refinement of four separate barrels.

Breguet apparently did not find the échappement naturel fully satisfactory as a commercial escapement. It was expensive to make, only his best workers could bring it off. Despite its sharing with the chronometer escapement the lack of need to oil the impulse surfaces he found it deficient in some practical ways. Some of the watches were returned for service to the escapement on numerous occasions. Indeed, Breguet bought back watch 1711 at the original price after a period of trying to satisfy the client. The shortcomings that caused him to cease development could well include those listed by George Daniels: extra friction caused by the additional escape wheel and instability caused by backlash between the meshing escape wheels.

Rolex’s recent patent for a tangential impulse double-wheel escapement suggests a renewed attempt to overcome these historical challenges. Unlike Breguet’s version, which suffered from instability and high production complexity, Rolex’s design prioritizes robustness, manufacturability, and self-starting capability. By leveraging modern materials like silicon and nickel-phosphorus, along with optimized locking and impulse geometry, Rolex appears to be refining the échappement naturel into a practical, industrially viable mechanism—potentially achieving what even Breguet could not.
