= Thomas O. Bales Jr. =

American entrepreneur

- Born: 1948; Honolulu, Hawaii, United States
- Died: October 12, 2023 (aged 74–75); Massachusetts
- Occupations: Serial entrepreneur and inventor
- Known for: Co-founder of Symbiosis Corp. and Syntheon LLC
- Spouse: Constance Ryan
- Children: William Bales; Maxwell Bales; Gregory Bales
- Parent(s): Lt. Col. (Ret.)Thomas O. Bales Sr. Julia Lurleyne Fulghum

Thomas O. Bales Jr. was an American Entrepreneur and Inventor and was the co-founder of Symbiosis Corp., Syntheon LLC, both medical device companies and EAC an aerospace company.

== Early life and education ==
Tom Bales was born in Honolulu, Hawaii and spent his childhood in Pensacola, Florida He is the son of Lieutenant Colonel Thomas O. Bales Sr. a Marine Corp. fighter pilot. and Julia (née Fulghum). He is a graduate of Massachusetts Institute of Technology with a major in Mechanical Engineering.

== Career ==
Tom Bales began his engineering career with medical device Company Cordis Corporation (Later acquired by Johnson and Johnson) He left Cordis to help form Cordis Spinoff Theratek International. In 1988 Tom Left Theratek to branch out on his own and start Symbiosis Corp. with Kevin Smith. After selling Symbiosis to American Home Products Corp. (Now Wyeth Division of Pfizer) for $175,000,000 he remained on staff for 4 years as Chief Technology Officer before leaving to start Environmental Aeroscience Corp (EAC) and Syntheon LLC.

Tom holds 213 US Patents in the fields of Medical Devices, Material Science, Electronics and Propulsion.

Tom was the Chief Scientist for the Energetic Ray Global Observatory (ERGO)Project,

Tom was the President of the Symbiosis Foundation

Tom was board chair for Ukulele Kids Club https://theukc.org/our-story/

Tom is the author of The Timescope, an historical science fiction short story about Leonardo da Vinci's travels in America during World War II (ISBN 979-8-3507-1120-2)

== Personal life ==
Tom Bales was married to Constance Ryan. They have 3 sons - William Bales, Maxwell Bales and Gregory Bales
