= Coaxial escapement =

Mechanism for regulating the speed of clocks

The coaxial escapement is a type of modern watch escapement mechanism invented by English watchmaker George Daniels in 1976 and patented in 1980. His friend and peer Derek Pratt contributed to this invention intellectually and physically. It is one of the few watch escapements to be invented in modern times and is used in most of the mechanical watch models currently produced by Omega SA.

Coaxial Escapement

== History ==
During the quartz crisis, English watchmaker George Daniels accepted a commission from American industrialist and watch collector Seth G. Atwood to create a timepiece that would fundamentally improve the performance of mechanical watches. As a result, Daniels invented the coaxial escapement in 1974 and patented it in 1980. The Atwood watch for Seth G. Atwood was completed in 1976.

== Influences ==
=== Charles Fasoldt ===
Charles Fasoldt, a German-American watch- and clockmaker, was instrumental in the development of the escapement mechanism. His patented escapement of 1865 introduced a novel duplex design with co-axially mounted twin escape wheels and a three-pallet lever. This design was aimed at reducing friction and enhancing the accuracy of timekeeping, which would later influence modern escapement designs. George Daniels' co-axial escapement, a significant advancement in the field of horology, drew from Fasoldt's concepts, refining them further for contemporary watchmaking.

=== Abraham-Louis Breguet ===
Abraham-Louis Breguet's 'natural escapement' also significantly influenced Daniels. Breguet's design involved two detent-like escape wheels arranged in a mirrored layout. Daniels evolved this by removing the meshing gears between the twin escape wheels, thus creating two independent gear trains, enhancing the escapement's practicality for contemporary watchmaking.

== Technical overview ==
The coaxial escapement is a modification of the lever escapement with some features of the detent escapement. One of the few advances in escapement design which have been adopted since the invention of the lever escapement by Thomas Mudge in the 18th century, the coaxial escapement functions with a system of three pallets that separate the locking function from the impulse, avoiding the sliding friction of the lever escapement. This makes lubrication of the pallets theoretically unnecessary and thereby minimizes one of the shortcomings of the traditional lever escapement. In practice, a small amount of lubrication is used on the locking and impulse surfaces of the pallet stones, reportedly to minimize impact corrosion.

=== Critical virtue ===
The critical virtue of the Daniels escapement is the virtual elimination of the sliding friction component; i.e., the sliding of the pallet stones over the teeth of the escapement gear. What little sliding friction remains is due to the impossibility of maintaining an exact tangential geometry throughout the duration of an impulse.

=== Radial friction vis- sliding friction ===
By utilizing radial friction instead of sliding friction at the impulse surfaces the coaxial escapement significantly reduces friction, theoretically resulting in longer service intervals (though many factors influence this including lubricant aging) and greater accuracy over time.

== Commercialization ==
The escapement was commercialized in 1999 by Omega SA when it introduced the first mass-produced watch incorporating the technology. It is the only escapement other than the Swiss lever escapement that is produced on an industrial scale. When it first came to the market as the Caliber 2500, it had an oscillation rate of 28,800 beats per hour (8 beats per second), considered a "hi-beat" movement. But the rate was reduced to 25,200 beats per hour (7 beats per second) in the Caliber 2500C. "While Daniels has recognized the advantages of higher beat movements, he has also noted that they aggravate the problem of sliding friction in the escapement (at the escape teeth and pallets). Higher beat movements produce increased speed and pressure at these critical surfaces."
