= Ron Pratt =

English cricketer

Ronald Ernest Charles Pratt (5 May 1928 – 1 June 1977) was an English first-class cricketer active 1952–59 who played for Surrey. He was born in Balham; died in Epsom.
