= Solar-powered watch =

Watch that is powered entirely or partly by a solar cell

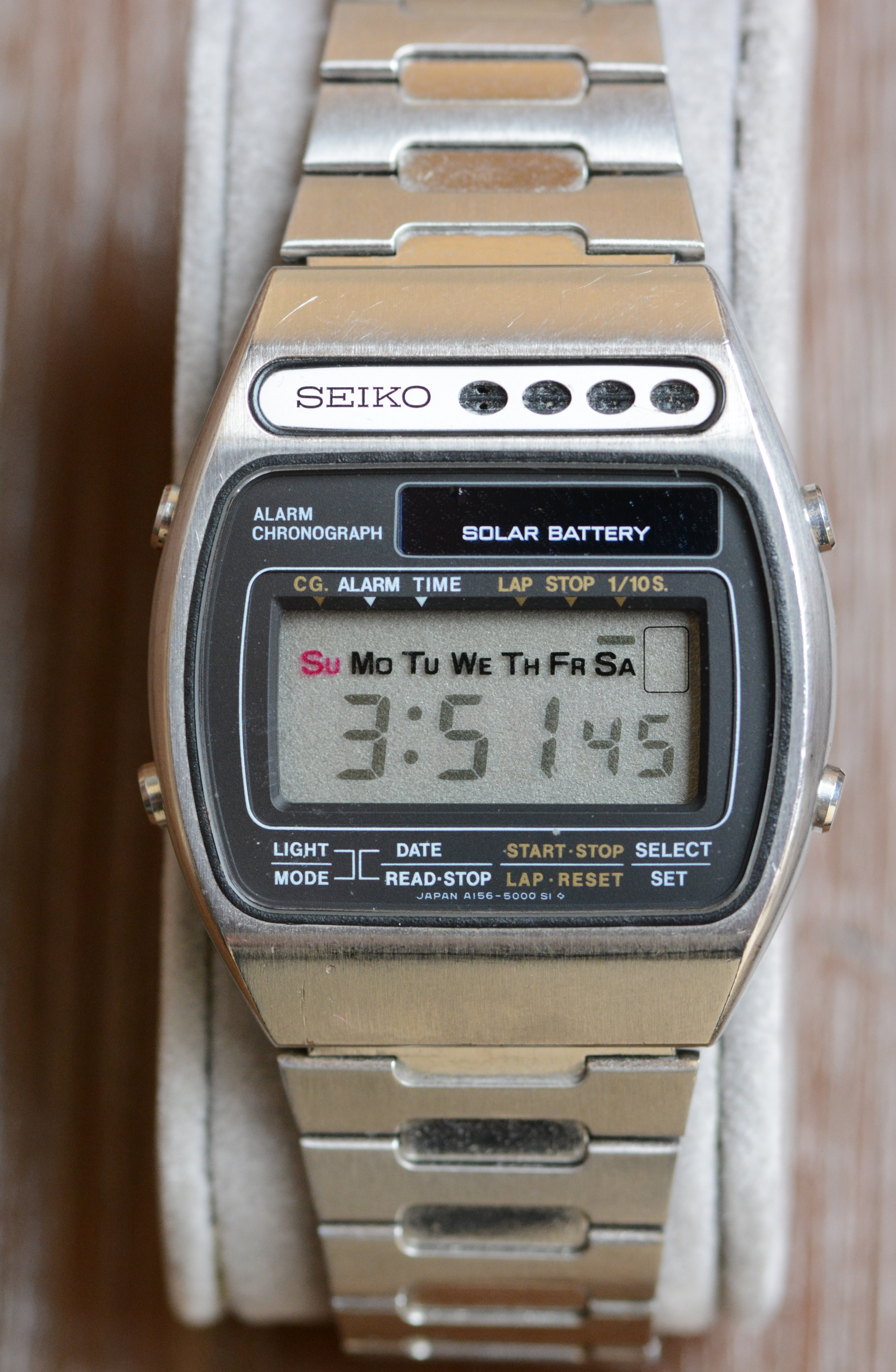
Seiko LCD Solar Alarm Chronograph A156-5000, 1978: Seiko's first solar-powered watch

A solar-powered watch or light-powered watch is a watch that is powered, entirely or partially, by solar power using solar cell technology.

== History ==
The first solar-powered watch, the Synchronar 2100, debuted in 1972. American engineer, Roger W. Riehl became known as the pioneer of solar-powered watches for combining technologies into an impressive wearable for the time period. The Synchronar was labeled 2100 for its claim to be accurate until the year 2100 with the estimation of within one minute accuracy per year. The first solar cell watch needed sunlight and the entire top of watch was two solar panels to maximize light absorption with a digital display on side. The Citizen Watch Crystron Solar Cell (1976) was the first analog quartz watch powered by solar cell technology. A model produced from 1978 by the Riehl Time Corporation was simply described as running on solar power, but having "silicon power cells" that "absorb energy from natural sunlight, daylight, or an ordinary light bulb".

Some of the early solar watches of the 1970s had innovative and unique designs to accommodate the array of photovoltaic solar cells needed to power them (Synchronar, Nepro, Sicura and some models by Cristalonic, Alba, Rhythm Watch, Seiko and Citizen Watch). Uranus Electronics created a conventional solar cell watch later in 1975 arranging two solar cells on either side of a digital display. Their more unique model was a calculator watch that featured 12 buttons around the watch for calculations and came with solar, charger, and battery powered options.

In 1988, seeking consumer products that showcased new technology, TechniArt created what they described as the world's first gold photovoltaic wristwatch, powered entirely by light and using a rechargeable capacitor instead of a traditional battery. Unfortunately the watch concept ultimately struggled in the marketplace around the turn of the 1990s. Company reflections noted that consumers looking for luxury or expensive timepieces preferred established brand names on the dial rather than a specialized tech startup, leading the partners to cancel the project by 1990 and pivot the business elsewhere.

In 1996, Citizen Watch started to sell analog light-powered watches under the Eco-Drive name. Some Eco-Drive models are popular for their translucent dials where the solar cell sits underneath the dials instead of crowding the interface. Since their introduction, photovoltaic devices have greatly improved their efficiency and thereby their capacity. Watchmakers have developed their technology such that solar-powered watches had by 2009 become a major part of their range. Several other watch manufacturers also use solar technology, such as Orient. Junghans, Casio, and Seiko.

Seiko's manufacturer, Epson introduced the Seiko Astron 7X Series in 2012 as the first GPS (Global Positioning System) solar-powered watch. GPS watches capture signals from satellites to keep a very accurate time. Epson developed a ring shaped ultra sensitive antennae capable of detecting GPS signals from 20,000 km away in the atmosphere. The ring shape follows the outer circumference of the watch around the dials.

Inexpensive solar-powered watches were first sold in the 1980s and were popular amongst children, often featuring famous fictional characters such as Transformers or G.I. Joe.

== Technological details ==
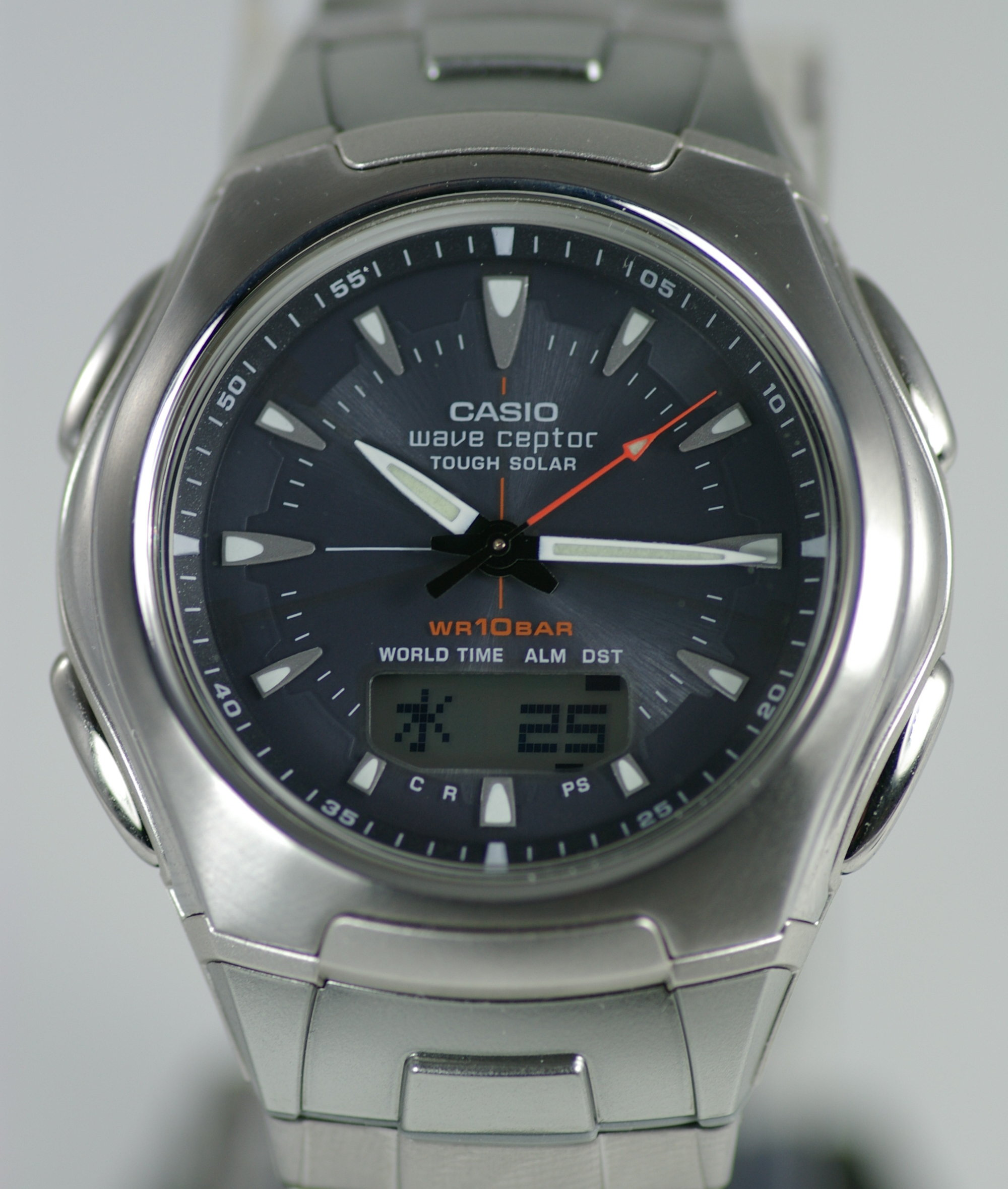
A Casio solar-powered watch, manufactured no later than 2009

Typically, sunlight and artificial light are absorbed by a solar panel behind the crystal. The dial is either on a layer above or actually on the solar panel. This solar panel converts the light into electrical energy to power the watch. The watch will usually store energy in a rechargeable cell to power itself during the night or when covered such as a wearer's clothing (e.g., sleeve). Citizen's watches use lithium-ion batteries to store sufficient energy to power the watch for up to five years without light exposure, by allowing the watch to enter a power-saving or hibernation mode during which the seconds hand stops until the watch is re-exposed to light. Not all have a power-save mode, yet will still hold a charge for typically six months, as with uncomplicated (date only) analog versions made by Citizen.

== Advantages and disadvantages ==
The solar-powered watches has a number of advantages:

- Eco-friendly: solar-powered watches reduce dependence on disposable batteries, helping to conserve the environment and reduce e-waste.

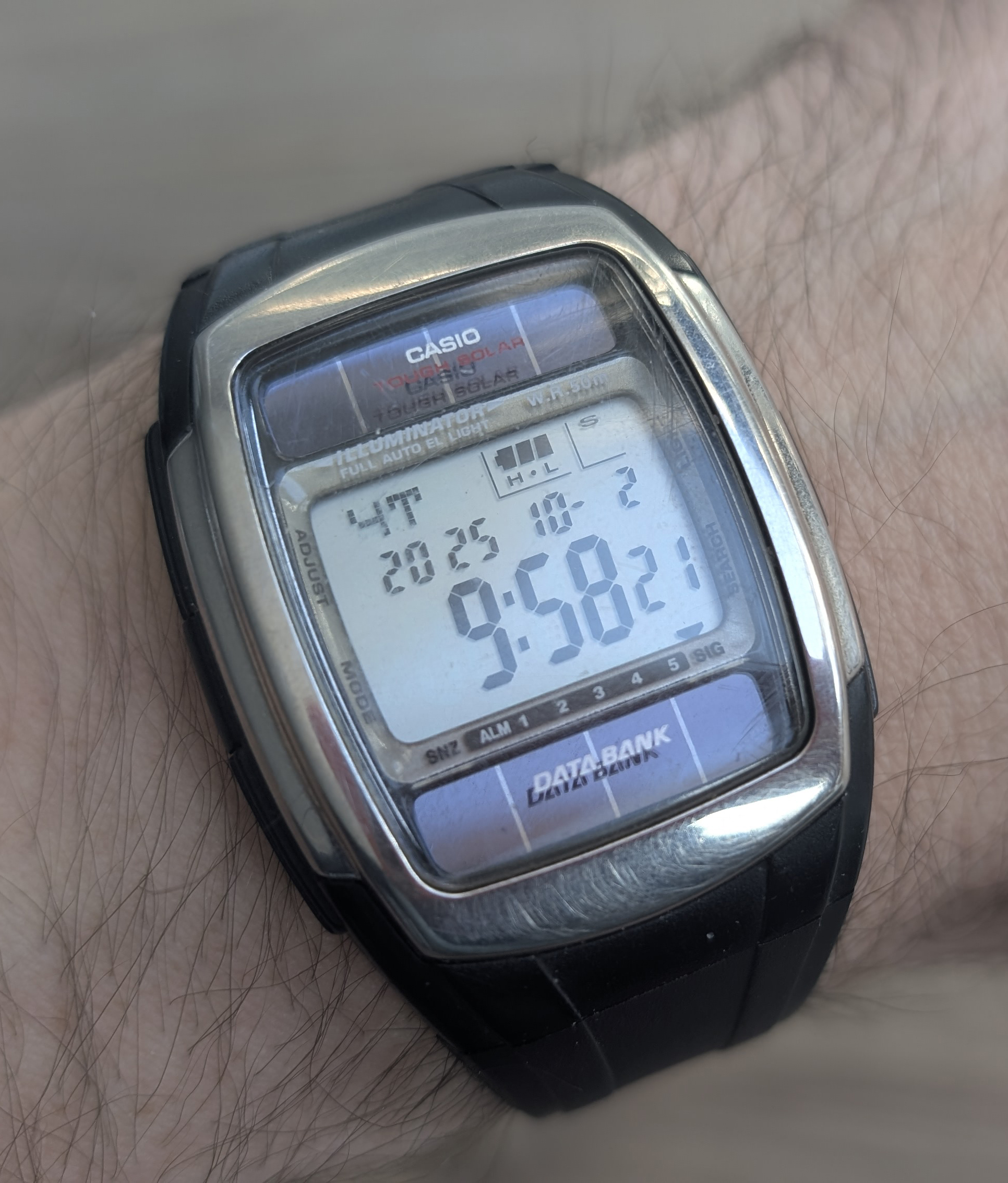
Casio DB-E30 Tough Solar Databank Watch, 2000s. An earlier version of Casio's waterproof solar-powered watch as pictured above.

- Low maintenance requirements: because solar-powered watches use rechargeable batteries, they need to be charged less frequently than traditional battery-powered watches.
- Continuous operation: with the right light, the solar-powered watches can maintain a constant supply of energy, allowing continuous operation without the need for manual recharging or battery replacement.
- Charging indicators: many solar-powered watches are equipped with charging indicators that show the charge level or when the watch is actively charging, providing users with information on the state of charge.

Overall, the solar-powered watches combines the functionality of accurate timekeeping with eco-friendly technology.

Disadvantages of solar-powered watches:

- The initial cost may be higher than traditional watches. One of the biggest disadvantages of solar-powered watches is their initial cost. These watches tend to be more expensive than their traditional counterparts because of the advanced technology used in their manufacture.
- Requires sufficient exposure to sunlight to maintain charge. One of the most significant disadvantages of solar-powered watches is their dependence on sunlight. Without sufficient exposure to sunlight, this watch will not be able to charge the batteries and therefore will not work.
