= Daniel Wellington =

Swedish watch brand

Daniel Wellington.
- Industry: Fashion
- Founded: 2011; 15 years ago
- Founder: Filip Tysander
- Headquarters: Stockholm, Sweden
- Owner: Filip Tysander
- Website: danielwellington.com

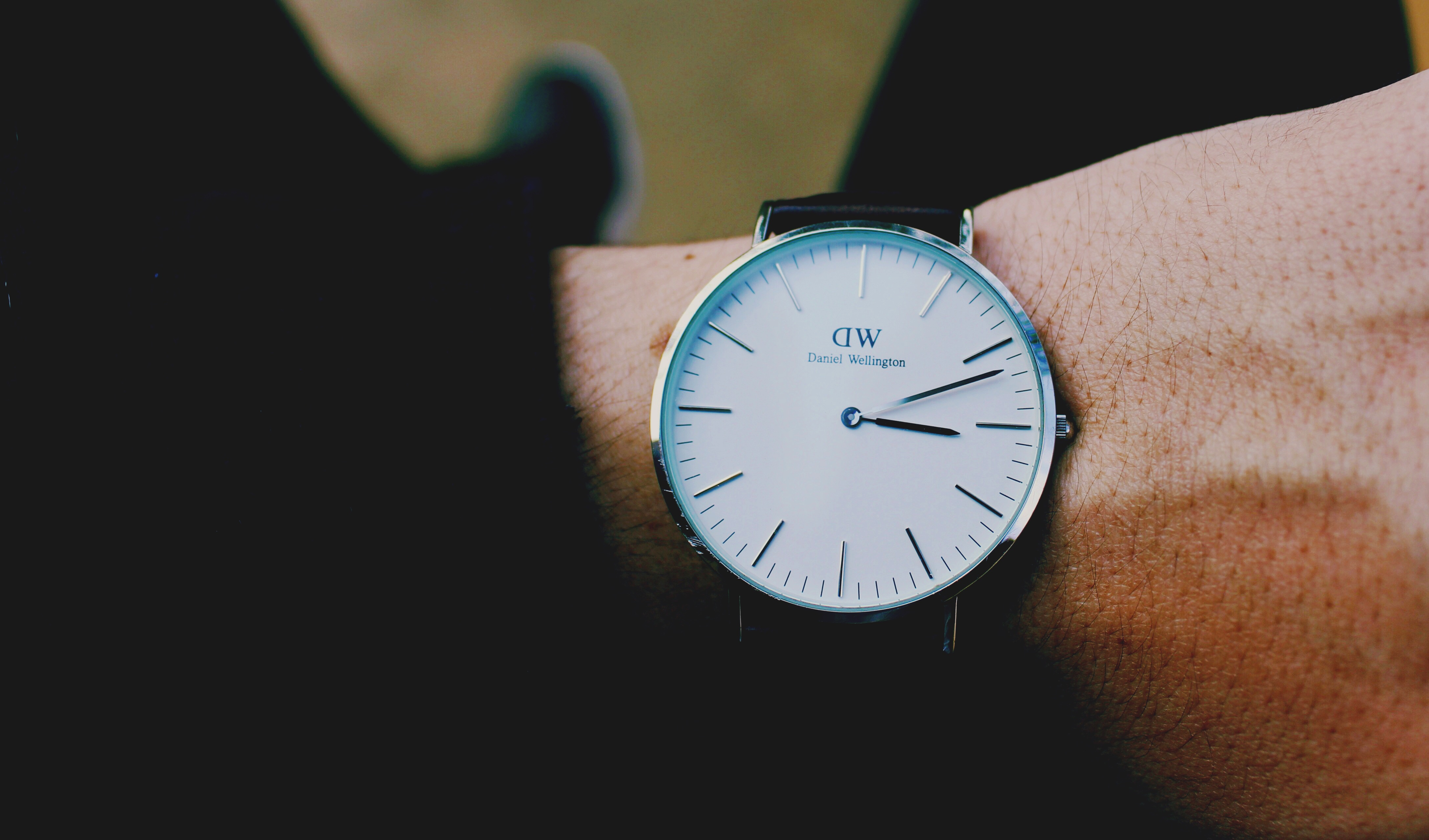
Daniel Wellington Classic Watch on Glasgow Strap

Daniel Wellington (DW) is a Swedish fashion-wristwatch brand founded in 2011 by Filip Tysander. Since its inception, Daniel Wellington has sold over 6 million watches, largely with a digital strategy using social networks like Instagram. Headquartered in central Stockholm, the company's products are sold in over 25 countries.

The watches are designed in Sweden, made in China, and use quartz movements made by Miyota, a large Japanese manufacturer as well as mechanical automatic movements made by Miyota. The watch straps are made of Italian "genuine leather" . Their "Classic" range of watches are named after British toponyms.Daniel Wellington has varying reputability among watch enthusiasts and consumers due to its price and corresponding quality.

In February 2017, Daniel Wellington was named the fastest-growing private company in Europe. The company made $230 million in revenue and $111.5 million in profit in 2016. However, in the later years, the company has struggled to keep its profitability. As of 2021, the Swedish watch manufacturer registered operating losses of approximately 387 million Swedish Kronor, making it the third consecutive year in which the company reported operating losses.

== See also ==
- Filip Tysander
