= SevenFriday =

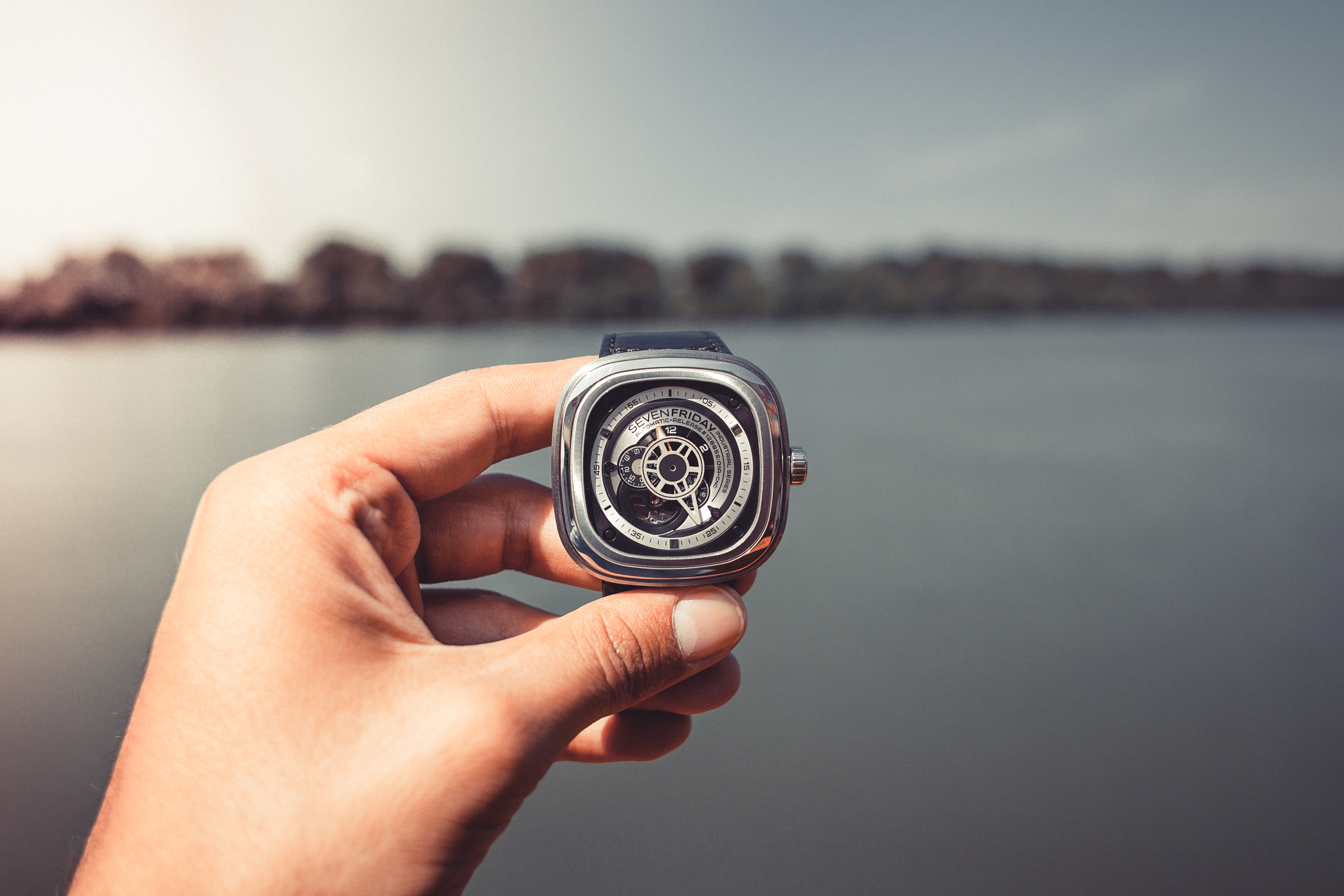
A SevenFriday watch

SevenFriday is a Swiss Zurich-based watch brand founded in 2012 by Daniel Niederer. The brand is known for its industrial-style large-size watches, and has gradually expanded into accessories, eyewear and other fields. Its design features include a case shape combining square and round elements and visible mechanical structures under a transparent case.

Most watches use Japanese Miyota automatic mechanical movements.
