= Wittnauer =

Wristwatch and timepiece brand

A. Wittnauer Company
- Company type: Currently a brand of Bulova
- Industry: Watch and clockmaking
- Predecessor: E. Robert & Co
- Founded: NY, U.S. (1885)
- Founder: Albert Wittnauer
- Headquarters: New Rochelle, New York, United States
- Area served: Worldwide
- Key people: Martha Wittnauer, CEO
- Products: Wittnauer, Wittnauer AllProof, watches, clocks
- Website: Wittnauer.com

Wittnauer is a watch and clock company, founded in New Rochelle, New York in 1885 by Swiss immigrant Albert Wittnauer, that is now a brand of the Bulova company, which is owned by Japanese conglomerate Citizen Watch Co.

== History ==
Albert Wittnauer was a Swiss immigrant who arrived in New York City in 1872 at the age of 16, and was employed by his brother-in-law, Eugene Robert, an importer of Swiss watches. Albert Wittnauer felt there was a market in America for a lower priced Swiss made watch.

Importing Swiss watches became expensive due to the heavy taxes placed on them so Wittnauer explored ideas for reducing the expense without losing the quality. The watches could be produced by a subsidiary of their own in Switzerland or they could assemble the watches domestically.

The first Wittnauer's watch line was crafted starting from 1880, but the Wittnauer brand was formally established 1888 when Wittnauer took over Eugene Robert’s company and renamed it the "A. Wittnauer Company". Wittnauer movements were at the beginning generally made for them by Swiss firms (Revue Thommen and others), while in later years Wittnauer used a number of different sources for their movements. The company began as a small family business, catering to the ever-growing world of both scientific and private exploration, which gained them a reputation for use by those who needed reliability: navigators, explorers, and astronomers.

The A. Wittnauer Co. became further involved with the United States Navy for early tests in the budding fields of aviation and navigation. Of the Wittnauer Company and products, horologist Marvin E. Whitney wrote: "No one company has been more involved in the design and production of so many different types of navigational timepieces and been involved in so many history making expeditions...".

In the following years, Wittnauer Co. steadily grew and moved to the New York center. During the 20th century, it also bought a production plant in Puerto Rico. When the last Wittnauer brother died in 1916, their sister Martha Wittnauer, became the first woman watchmaker CEO.

During World War I Wittnauer produced instruments and watches for the early aviation units. The most famous model was probably the Wittnauer AllProof, produced for the first time in 1918, and one of the first all proof models ever used by daredevil Jimmie Mattern in his 1933 attempt to fly around the world in his Vega 5B, "Old Cromwell", and by Neil Armstrong during the Gemini 8 mission. In 1926, the NBC selected Wittnauer Company to provide the official timing for its radio broadcasting.

On May 20–21, 1932 Amelia Earhart made the first solo flight by a woman across the Atlantic with her Lockheed Vega-5B equipped with Wittnauer instruments. Wittnauer products were widely used in scientific expeditions and exploration, and was - with Longines movements - one of three contenders for the first mission on the moon along with Omega Speedmaster and Rolex Daytona.

During World War 2, Wittnauer started its major production line of compasses, used by soldiers and aviators during combat. These compasses were produced on a large scale and often had the letters US imprinted on the front of their case. To show their brand name, the name Wittnauer was usually placed on the face of the compass, in line with the large "S" (South) on the face. Wittnauer's long history with watch manufacturing and case manufacturing expedited their speed and precision with which their compasses were made. Furthermore, Wittnauer had previously attained a good relationship with the U.S. military, and was permitted to produce such compasses. These compasses vary in value, but trend at around 30-300 USD, or more with additional pieces such as original boxes or paperwork.

In 1950 the Swiss company Longines bought Wittnauer, and marketed some very similar lines of watches under both brand names, maintaining separate factories.

In 1957, Wittnauer announced a line of 14 cameras with lenses and accessories. These included the CineTwin, a combination 8mm movie camera and projector, as well as many still cameras with Wittnauer branding. Most of them were manufactured in Germany by Braun, while the Wittnauer Festival model was made by Bolsey. Wittnauer sold cameras until about 1963.

=== Recent history ===
In 1995 Swatch broke the 125-year collaboration between Longines and Wittnauer and took over the Longines distribution. The Wittnauer Company retained its reputation for most of the 20th century. After some budget problems, it was eventually bought by Bulova for $11.6 million in September 2001.

Bulova launched a new 'Nightlife' range of fashion watches under the Wittnauer brand.

== See also ==
- Hamilton Watch Company
- Elgin Watch Company
- Illinois Watch Company
- Benrus
