= Miyota =

Miyota may refer to:

- Miyota, Nagano, a town in Nagano Prefecture, Japan
- Miyota (watch movement manufacturer)
