= Bulova =

Manufacturer of watches and clocks

Bulova Watch Company
- Type: Subsidiary
- Industry: Watch and clockmaking
- Founded: Queens, New York City, United States, 1875, as the J. Bulova Company
- Founder: Joseph Bulova
- Headquarters: New York City, United States
- Area served: Worldwide
- Key people: Jeffrey Cohen, president John Wille, chief financial officer
- Products: Watches, clocks and accessories
- Brands: Accu•Swiss, Accutron, Bulova, Caravelle, Wittnauer
- Revenue: US$164 million (2022)
- Parent: Citizen Watch
- Website: bulova.com

Bulova is an American timepiece manufacturing company that was founded in 1875 in New York City. Formerly the Bulova Watch Company, it makes watches, clocks and accessories.

== History ==
=== Founding ===
Bulova was founded and incorporated as the J. Bulova Company in 1875 by Bohemian-Jewish immigrant Joseph Bulova. It was reincorporated under the name Bulova Watch Company in 1923, became part of the Loews Corporation in 1979, and was sold to Citizen at the end of 2007.

Bulova started a small jewelry shop in New York City around 1875 on Maiden Lane, which specialized in jewelry and the repair of clocks and the occasional pocket watch. Around 1911, Bulova began producing table clocks and pocket watches. In 1912, Joseph Bulova launched his first plant dedicated entirely to the production of watches in Biel, Switzerland where he began a standardized mass production. The watches were popular with the American public. In 1927, Bulova set up an observatory on the roof of a skyscraper located at 580 Fifth Avenue to determine universal time precisely.

Bulova established its operations in Woodside, New York, and Flushing, New York, where it made innovations in watchmaking, and developed a number of watchmaking tools. Its horological innovations included the Accutron watch that used a resonating tuning fork as a means of regulating the time-keeping function.

During the 1920s and 1930s, Bulova was noted for its art deco watches, typically either rectangular or square. Models from this period included the Breton, the Banker, and the Commodore. All three of these models were modernized in 2020 as the Joseph Bulova Collection, using Swiss-made Sellita mechanical movements. From 1922 through 1930, Bulova marketed 350 different ladies’ Art Deco watches, with at least an equal number of models for men.

The Westfield Watch Company, Inc. is listed as a Bulova subsidiary at least as early as 1931, but Bulova had trademarked the Westfield name in 1927. Westfields were considered the lower-cost options in the Bulova line, since the movements typically had lower jewel counts than mainstream Bulovas, and cases and straps may also not have been of the same quality as other Bulova models. Like the regular Bulovas, the Westfield movements were Swiss made, but the two lines did not use the same movements. Westfield watches were produced at least through the 1950s, with the Caravelle line introduced in the early 1960s. The Bulova trademark of the Westfield name is reported as cancelled in 1989.

=== Advertising milestones ===
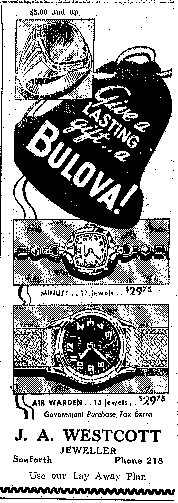
December 1942 ad for Bulova watches from Canada

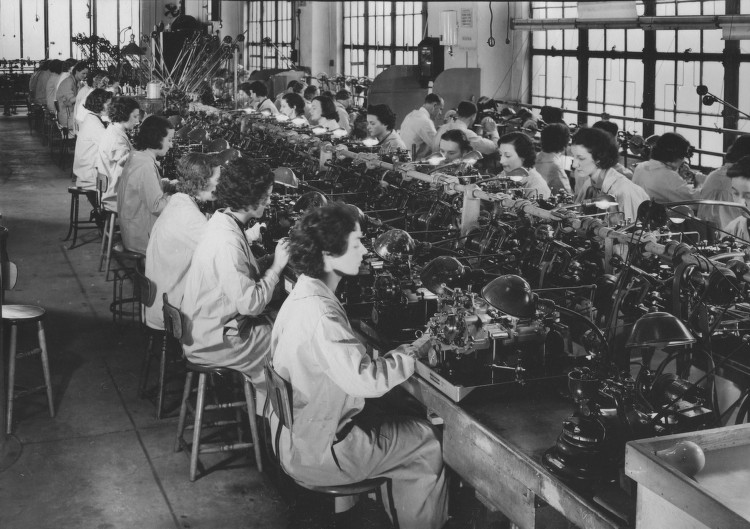
Women working in the pinion department of Bulova Watch c. 1937

Bulova became a renowned watch company in 1922, starting with an advertising campaign in the Saturday Evening Post. Through the 1960s, Bulova led all American watchmakers in marketing expenditures, and it enhanced its distribution chains from jewelry stores and chains to general merchandising outlets, with over 20,000 U.S. distributors by 1968.

Bulova produced the first national advertisement broadcast on radio in 1926, announcing the first beep in history: ‘At the tone, it’s eight o’clock, Bulova Watch Time’, an announcement heard by millions of Americans. In 1927, Charles Lindbergh became the first solo pilot to cross the Atlantic nonstop. His crossing earned him a Bulova Watch and a check for $1000, and it became an emblem for the brand that created the model "Lone Eagle" in his likeness. Bulova claims to have been the first manufacturer to offer electric clocks beginning in 1931, but the Warren Telechron Company began selling electric clocks in 1912, 19 years prior to Bulova. In the 1930s and 1940s, the brand was a huge success with its rectangular plated watches whose case was strongly curved to better fit the curve of the wrist. In 1932, Bulova ran a "Name the Watch" contest for its new $24.75 timepiece, with a top prize of $1,000 and total prizes of $10,000. By 1940, Bulova sponsored each of the top 20 radio shows in the US.

Bulova produced the world's first television advertisement, on July 1, 1941 (the first day that commercial advertising was permitted on television), before a baseball game between the Brooklyn Dodgers and Philadelphia Phillies over New York station WNBT (now WNBC). The announcement, for which the company paid anywhere from $4.00 (equivalent to $88 in 2025) to $9.00 (equivalent to $197 in 2025), displayed a WNBT test card modified to look like a clock with the hands showing the time. The Bulova logo, with the phrase "Bulova Time", was shown in the lower right-hand quadrant of the test pattern while the second hand swept around the dial for one minute.

In the 1940s, Bulova made a few examples of their complex four sided, five-dial per side "sports timer" analog game clock

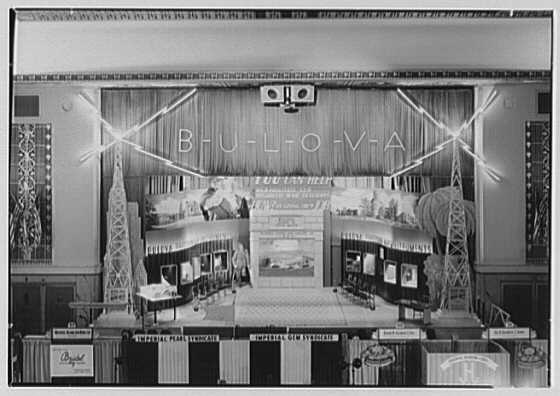
Bulova Watch Co., Exhibit, Waldorf Astoria. 1944

In 1945, Arde Bulova, chairman of the board, founded the Joseph Bulova School of Watchmaking to provide training for disabled veterans after the Second World War. The school later became a full-fledged rehabilitation facility, an advocate for disabled people nationwide, and one of the founders of wheelchair sports in the United States. The school closed in 1993.

In 1949/50, Bulova entered into a contract with the Academy of Motion Picture Arts and Sciences for the right to use the words "Academy Award" and "Oscar", along with the copyrighted image commonly known as the "Oscar". In 1952, Bulova and the Academy accepted a Federal Trade Commission stipulation that allowed Bulova to continue its use of the trademarked words as long as the company made it clear that such usage was based on a licensing agreement rather than “representative of meritorious award made on the basis of comparative tests with other watches.” From 1950 through 1954, Bulova issued over 25 ladies models and 14 men's models identified with the Academy Awards, paying $154,000 in licensing fees.

In the mid-1950s, Bulova sponsored the televised Frank Sinatra Show, presenting Sinatra with numerous wristwatches which he, in turn, had engraved with personal notes and gave to his friends. Bulova later supported the Frank Sinatra School of the Arts. The relationship continued through 2023, with Bulova's release of the Rat Pack model, an entry-level dress watch (limited edition of 5,000 pieces), along with a series of models named after Sinatra hits (e.g. Fly Me to the Moon, My Way, and others).

The ad campaign for Bulova's Accutron watch was profiled in the 7th season of the television series Mad Men, in which a spokesman utters the line: "It's more than a timepiece, it's a conversation piece".

In 1967, Bulova bought the Universal Genève company of Geneva, Switzerland, and sold it in December 1977. The factory in Biel was closed in 1983.

In 1973, Gulf and Western Industries acquired a stake in the company, which it sold to Stelux Manufacturing Company, a Hong Kong-based watch components manufacturer, in 1976.

=== Accutron ===
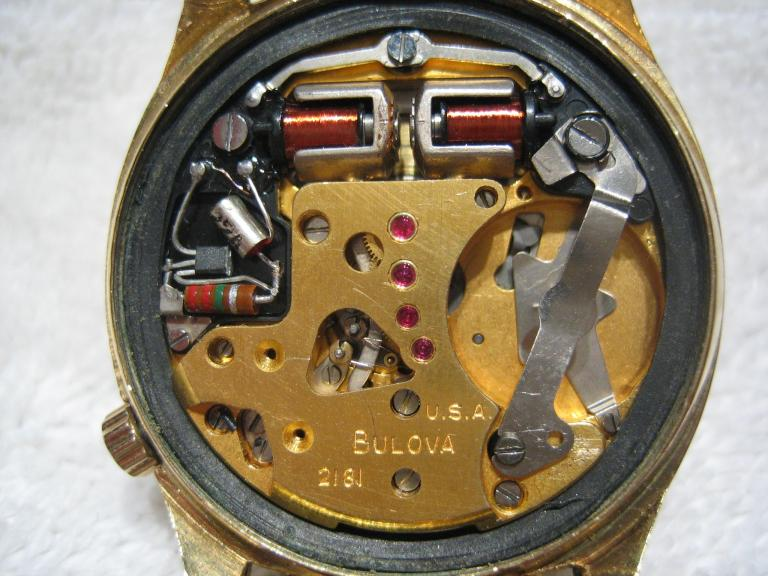
Accutron movement showing tuning fork prongs around the two electromagnetic coils at the top of the watch that drive it

Bulova's "Accutron" watches, first sold in October 1960, use a 360 Hz tuning fork instead of a balance wheel as the timekeeping element. The inventor, Max Hetzel, was born in Basel, Switzerland, and joined the Bulova Watch Company in 1950. The tuning fork was powered by a one-transistor electronic oscillator circuit, so the Accutron qualifies as the second "electronic watch", following the Hamilton Electric released in 1957. Instead of the ticking sound made by mechanical watches, the Accutron had a faint, high-pitched hum that came from the vibrating tuning fork. A forerunner of modern quartz watches that also keep time with a vibrating resonator, the Accutron was guaranteed to be accurate to one minute per month, or two seconds per day, considerably better than mechanical watches of the time. The Accutron was widely advertised in the print media (including magazines like Life and Ebony) with the tagline "so revolutionary -- so accurate, it's the first timepiece in history that's guaranteed 99.9977 accurate on your wrist." An Accutron was buried in a time capsule at New York's 1964–65 World's Fair. By 1973, over four million Accutrons had been sold.

=== The Apollo 15 watch ===
In the 1960s, the company was involved in a rivalry with Omega Watches to be selected as the 'first watch on the Moon'. In 1971, a Bulova chronograph was carried on board Apollo 15, the fourth mission to land men on the Moon, by mission commander David Scott. All twelve men who walked on the Moon wore standard Omega Speedmaster watches that had been officially issued by NASA. Those watches are deemed to be government property. Transcripts from the Apollo 15 Lunar Surface Journal attest to the fact that during Scott's second excursion on the Moon's surface, the crystal on his Omega watch had popped off. So, during his third lunar walk, he used his backup Bulova watch. The Bulova Chronograph Model #88510/01 is the only privately owned watch to have been worn on the lunar surface. There are images of Scott wearing the watch, when he saluted the American flag on the Moon, with the Hadley Delta expanse in the background. The watch shows "significant wear from exposure while on the Moon, and from splashdown and recovery." In 2015, the watch sold for $1.625 million at RR Auction in Boston, which makes it one of the most expensive astronaut-owned artifacts ever sold at auction and one of the most expensive watches sold at auction. The watch is also a unique timepiece as it seems to have been a prototype, only revealed by Scott to Bulova's fans in 2014. Therefore, the company released an homage edition of the lunar watch in early 2016, using a modern high frequency quartz movement for the watch that took more than 40 years to make its way into production line.

=== Computron ===
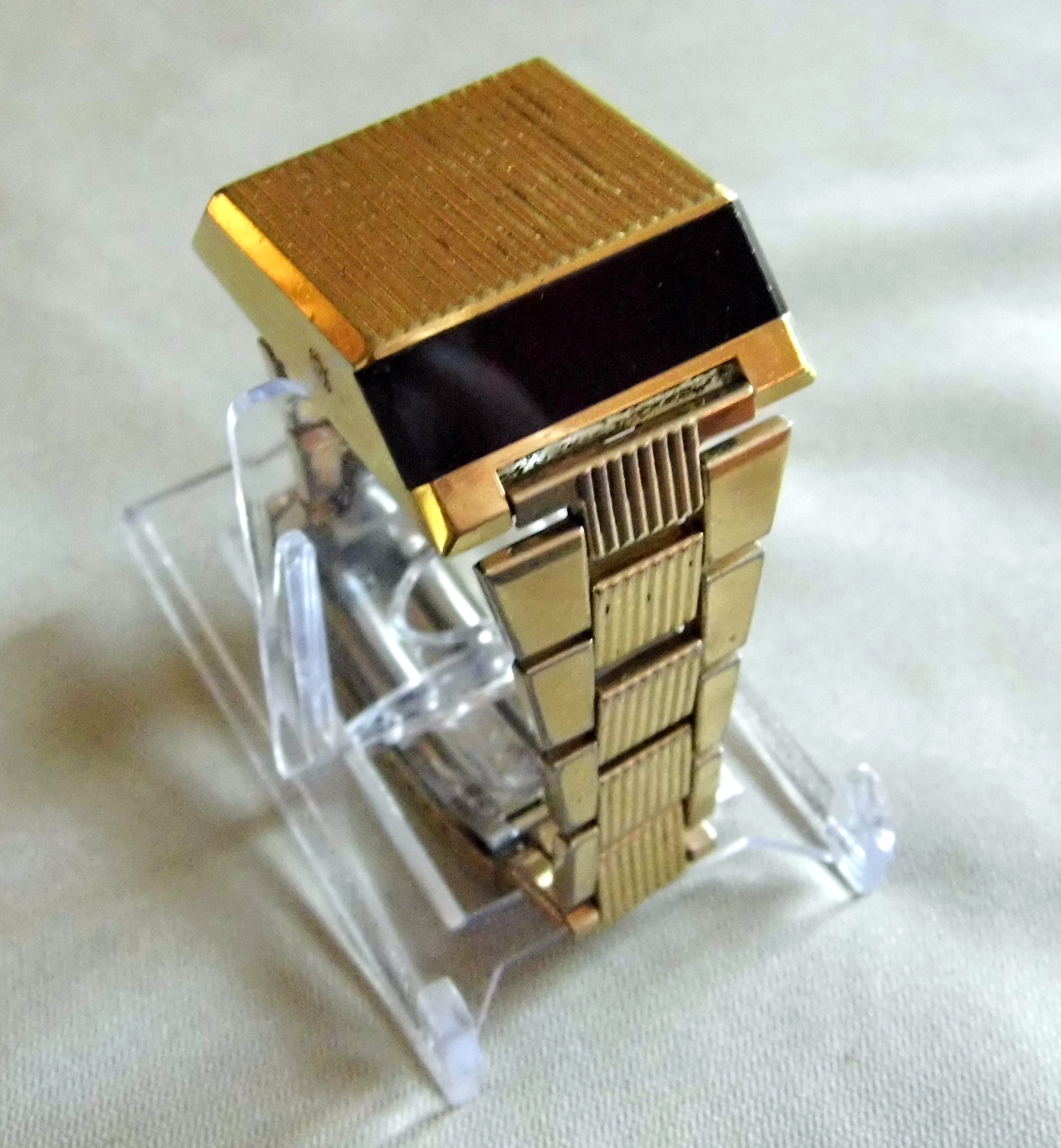
Bulova Computron

During the quartz crisis, Bulova followed the lead of other watchmakers creating electronic quartz watches by introducing the Computron watch in 1976. The Computron was Bulova's first watch with a LED display and first digital watch. It featured a distinctive trapezoidal steel case profile, with the display located on the side of the case rather than the main face. It was marketed as a beneficial design for drivers so that they could view the watch without needing to roll their wrists or release the steering wheel, but this was mitigated by the need to press a button on the side of the case to wake the display. In later versions, repeatedly pressing the button cycled the display to the seconds, date, day, and a second time zone. The success of the Computron was a significant factor in keeping Bulova financially viable through the next several years.

=== 21st century ===
On January 10, 2008, Citizen bought the Bulova Watch Company from Loews Corporation for $250 million.

Bulova designs, manufactures, and markets several different brands, including: the signature "Bulova", the stylish "Caravelle" (formerly "Caravelle New York"), the dressy/formal Swiss-made "Wittnauer Swiss", and the "Marine Star". In 2014 Bulova ceased the sale of watches under the "Accutron" and "Accutron by Bulova" brand, eliminating some Accutron models and subsuming others under the "Bulova" brand.

In 2010, Bulova introduced the Precisionist, a new type of quartz watch with a higher frequency crystal (262144 Hz, eight times the industry standard 32768 Hz) which is claimed to be accurate to ±10 seconds per year (0.32 ppm) and has a smooth sweeping seconds hand like automatic watches rather than the typical quartz watch seconds hand that jumps each second.

From 2012 to 2015, Bulova produced a line of Swiss-made watches known as Accu•Swiss, which took the place of the previously discontinued Accutron line. Accu•Swiss itself was discontinued in 2015 at the direction of Citizen.

In 2019, Bulova reissued the Computron brand, preserving the size and appearance of the originals, but updating the internal electronics. The new Computrons were made available in chrome, gold, and black, the first two colors being what had been used for the originals.

In 2020, the Citizen Group split Accutron off from Bulova and launched it as its own stand-alone brand, highlighting its new electrostatic movement technology and re-introducing vintage inspired "Legacy" models. This continued in 2023 with the re-introduction of the Accutron "Astronaut T". Accutron has stated its intention to continue to develop a new version of the tuning-fork technology, even though industrial equipment used in the 1960s and 1970s to produce the technology no longer exists.

== In religion ==
The Accutron, along with other tuning-fork watches, have become popular with Orthodox Jewish Chazzanim (cantors). Most rabbis rule against the use of a conventional tuning fork on Shabbat, due to its similarity to a musical instrument. Tuning fork watches are therefore useful as they produce a constant note (360 Hz being a slightly flat F#) that can be easily heard without breaking the laws of Shabbat, particularly as producing the note is not the primary function of the watch (that being telling the time).

== See also ==
- Hamilton Watch Company
