= Eco-Drive =

Model range of watches by Citizen

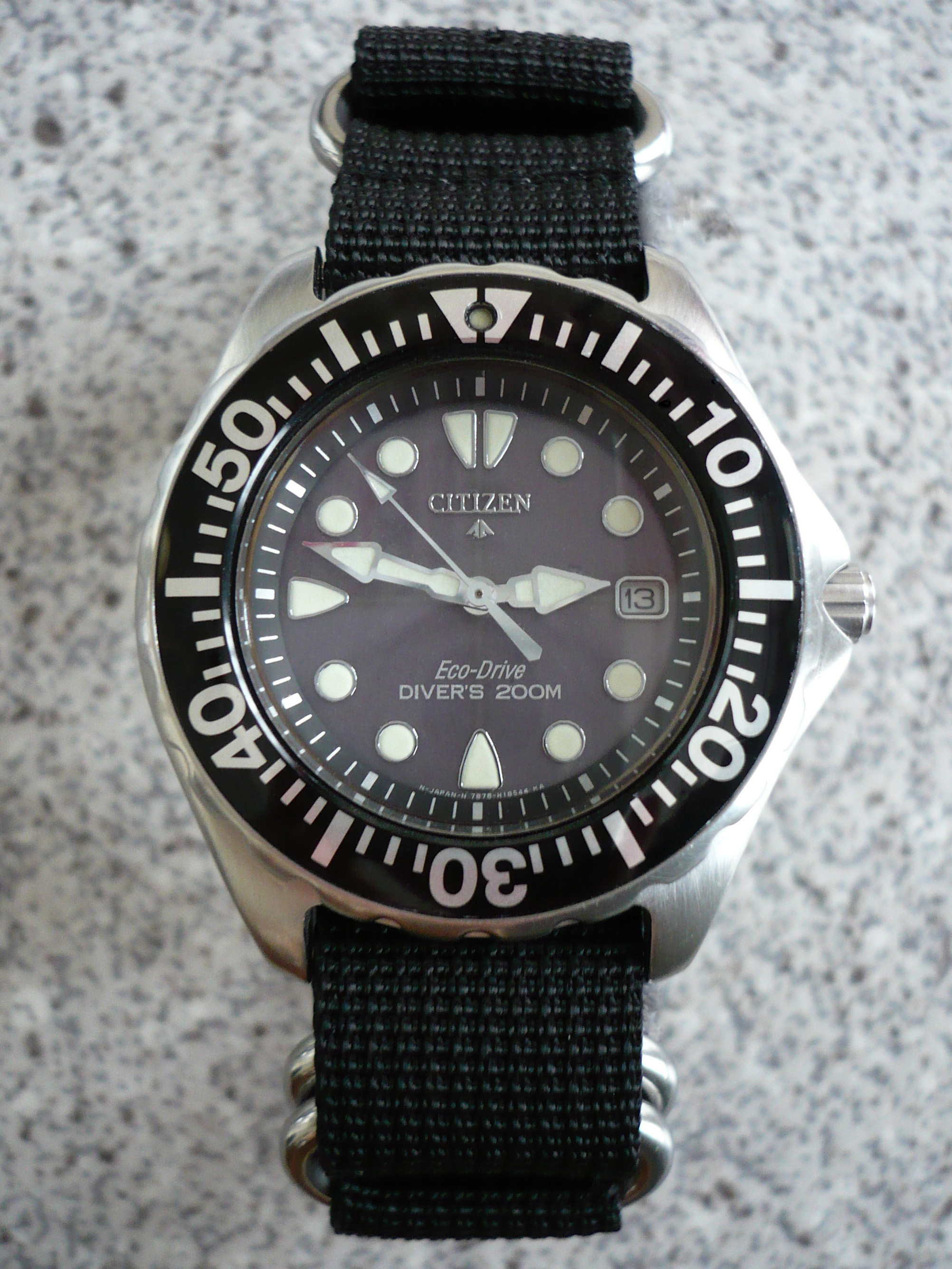
Citizen Promaster Eco-Drive AP0440-14F Diver's 200 m manufactured in 2000. The 7878 caliber Eco-Drive movement used in this watch can run for up to 180 days on its secondary power cell. Four solar cell segments are just visible under the dial.

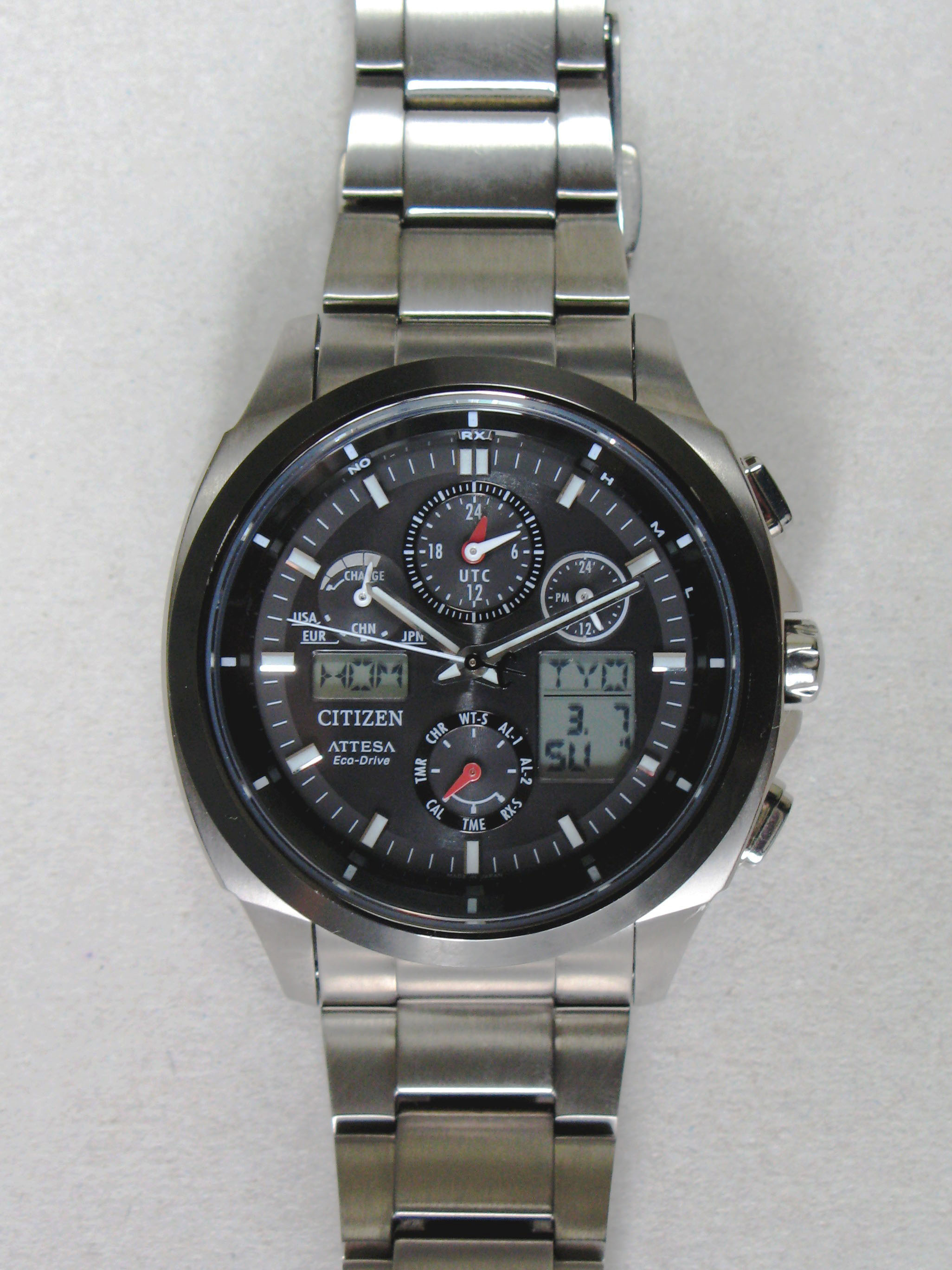
Citizen Attesa Eco-Drive ATV53-3023 analog-digital chronograph with 4 area Radio Controlled reception (North America, Europe, China, Japan). Manufactured in 2010.

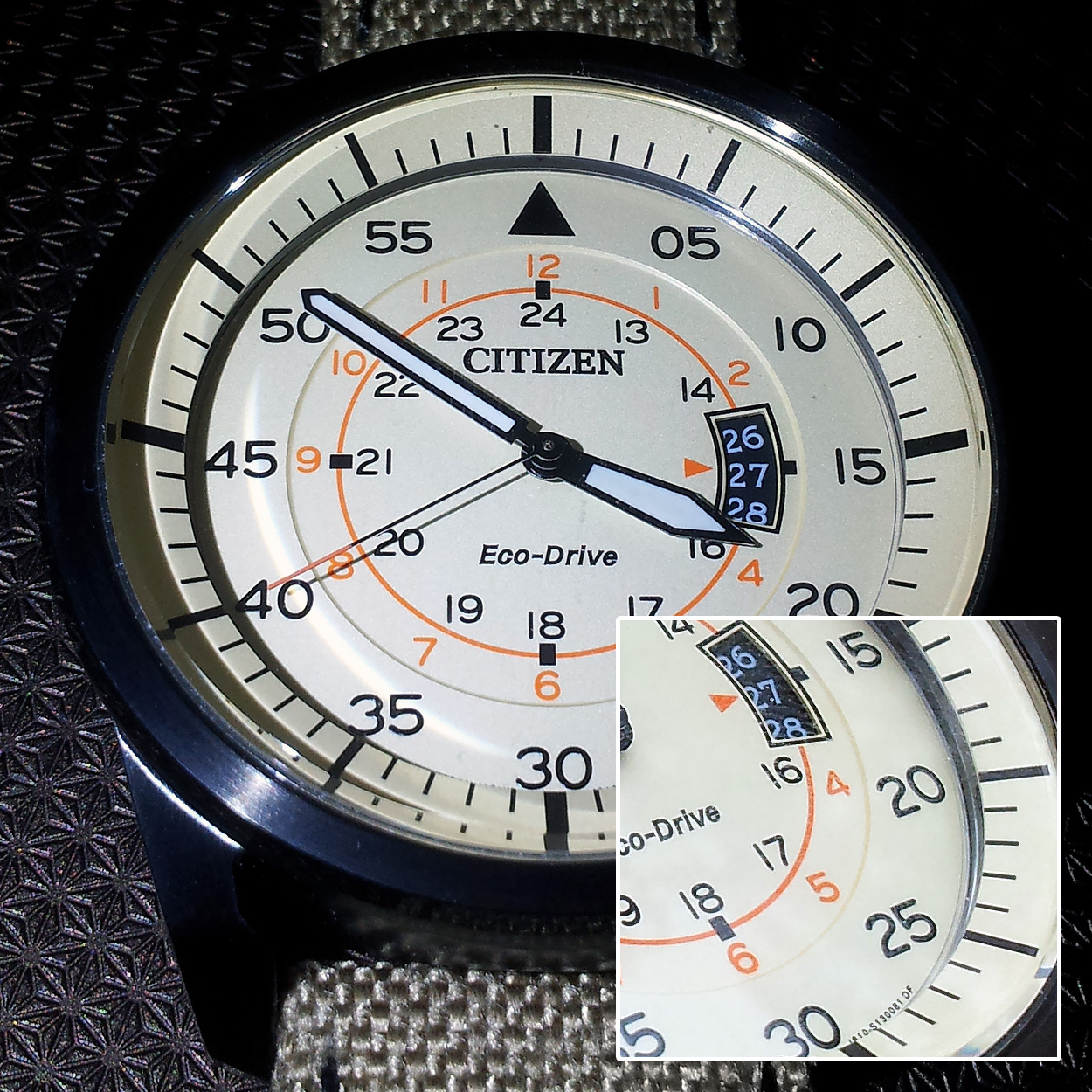
Citizen Eco-Drive METAL AW1365-19P featuring a light-absorbing "solar ring" instead of solar cell panels, allowing opaque metal dials to be used.

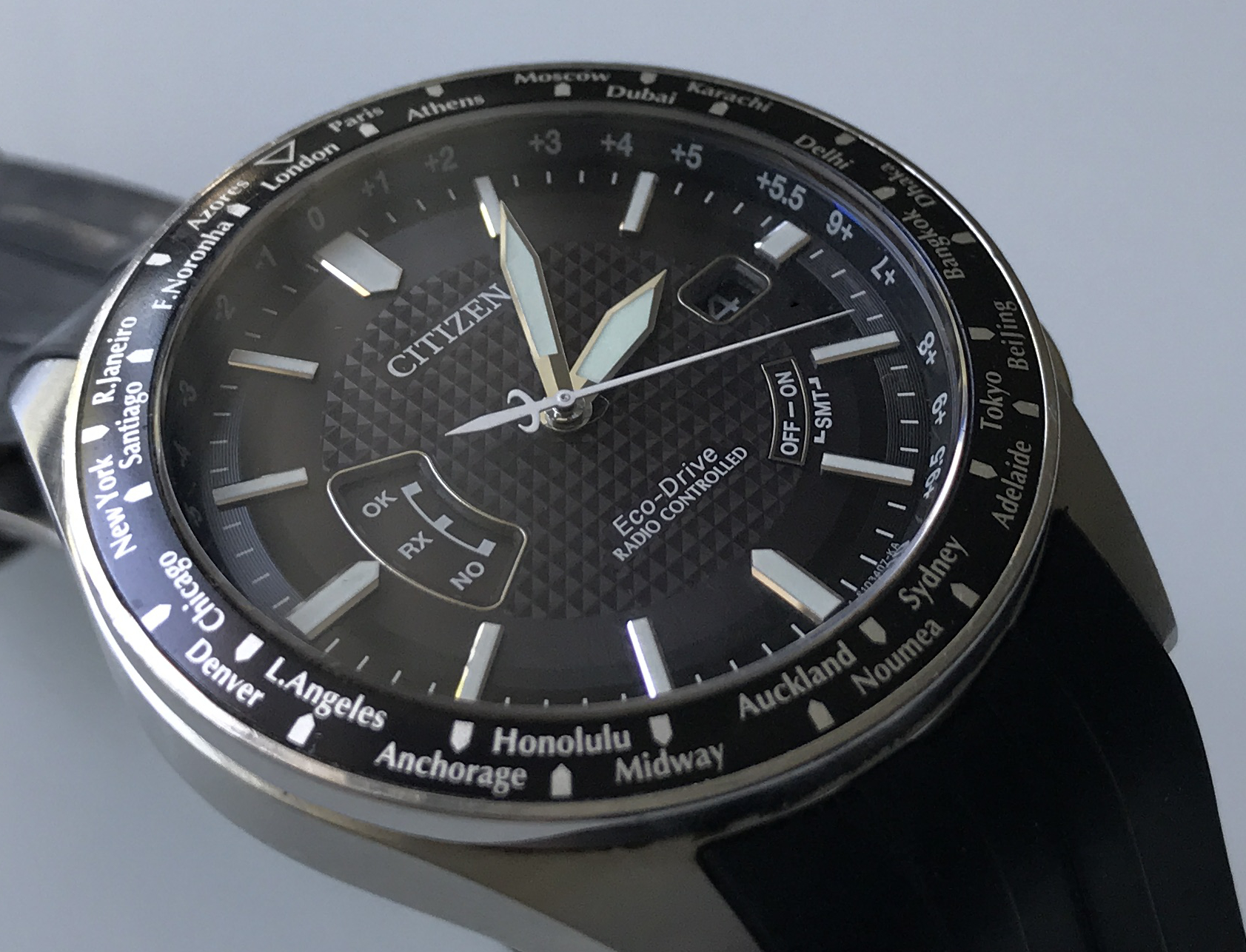
Example of the invisible solar cells thanks to VITRO technology, using the CB0021-06E radio-controlled watch model (from 2011 to 2018).

Eco-Drive is a model range of watches manufactured and marketed worldwide by Citizen Watch Co., Ltd., powered primarily by light. As of 2007, the company estimated the drive system had eliminated the disposal of ten million batteries in North America.

Citizen introduced the Eco-Drive line to Asia, Latin America, and Europe in 1995 and to the United States in April, 1996.

The Eco-Drive concept introduced several technical refinements over previous solar powered watches, including light-capturing cells that could be made virtually invisible behind the dial instead of highly conspicuous, enhancing the appearance of the watch.

== History ==
=== Eco-Drive concept ===
The technical platform that made the Eco-Drive concept possible was the Eco-Drive caliber 7878 movement. This movement was the first light-powered movement where the solar cells could be mounted under the dial. Previous light powered watches from Citizen and other manufacturers had the solar cell(s) mounted directly on the dial. This innovation was enabled by marked improvements in thin film amorphous silicon solar cells, which by the early 1990s had become significantly more efficient. By locating a sufficiently translucent dial material over the now more efficient solar cells, enough light could pass through the dial face to power the movement. Though the Eco-Drive caliber 7878 movement solar cells remained slightly visible through the dial, the physical styling of the light-powered watch was no longer constrained by visible solar cells.

To store electrical energy the first Eco-Drive movements employed titanium lithium-ion rechargeable or secondary batteries. This battery type became available in the early 1990s, enabling an Eco-Drive 7878 movement to run 180 days on secondary power before requiring recharging via light exposure – a marked improvement in energy storage over previous light-powered watches. The movement also featured an "insufficient recharging" indicator. The accuracy of the quartz movement was stated as within ± 20 seconds per month at a normal temperature range of 5 to 40 °C (41 to 104 °F).

=== Commercial history ===
In addition to the first three Eco-Drive models introduced in 1995, Citizen marketed numerous other Eco-Drive models during the 1990s, including the 6.05 mm (0.238 in) thick Eco-Drive Slim of 1996.

Where the first models offered hours, minutes, seconds and date features, ultimately the movements evolved to include a broad range of design features, including complex analog and digital-analog movements and the horological complications of chronographs, flyback chronographs and dive watches.

In the early 2000s, while wristwatch sales declined with the advent of cell phones and their timekeeping capability, demand for Citizen watches in North America remained robust. Eco-Drive models were well received, generating a third of Citizen's North American revenues by 2000. In 2002 the VITRO technology (Eco-Drive VITRO) came on the market, where the solar cells were no longer even slightly visible under the dial. During the mid-2000s, wristwatch sales improved for Citizen thanks to further development of the Eco-Drive line and integration of radio-controlled timing with the 2002 Eco-Drive line. Later specialized tool watch designs were introduced like the Promaster Eco-Drive Professional Diver 1000M Titanium BN7020-09E in 2017. This is a very large watch, the titanium watch case has a diameter of 52.2 mm and thickness of 22 mm and features a helium release valve, designed for mixed gas saturation diving at great depths.

==== Eco-Drive Concept Models ====
Since 2009, Citizen has developed Eco-Drive Concept Models as technology demonstration and marketing tools. These Eco-Drive Concept Models are generally shown at exhibitions and produced in limited editions. The Concept Model 2011 was the Eco-Drive SATELLITE WAVE that has a movement that can receive time synchronization signals from GPS satellites. This makes radio-controlled timing possible in remote areas that are not serviced by land based radio time signal stations. In 2012 Citizen announced the Eco-Drive RING Concept Model. This watch features a ring-shaped solar cell surrounding the watch case sidewall. In 2018 Citizen announced it developed the Caliber 0100 Eco-Drive prototype autonomous high-accuracy quartz watch movement which is claimed to be accurate to ± 1 second per year. Key elements to obtain the high claimed accuracy are applying a for a watch unusual shaped (AT-cut) quartz crystal operated at 2^{23} or 8388608 Hz frequency, thermal compensation and hand selecting pre-aged crystals. Besides that AT-cut variations allow for greater temperature tolerances, specifically in the range of −40 to 125 °C (−40 to 257 °F), they exhibit reduced deviations caused by gravitational orientation changes. As a result, errors caused by spatial orientation and positioning become less of a concern. The Caliber 0100 movement in 2018 was not available for sale to the public, the technology inside the movement will be introduced in future models. In March 2019 three limited edition wrist watch models with the Caliber 0100 movement were announced to become available for sale with deliveries expected around the 2019 fall.

==== Recent history ====
According to Citizen, by 2011 80% of their wristwatches featured Eco-Drive, and the company saw Eco-Drive type watches as the focus of new generations of watches.

In 2012 Citizen offered over 320 Eco-Drive watch models in various types, styles and price ranges.

== Eco-Drive technology ==
=== Light as power source ===
Most Eco-Drive type watches are equipped with a special titanium lithium ion secondary battery charged by an amorphous silicon photocell located behind the dial. Light passes through the crystal and dial before reaching the photocell.

Depending on the electronic movement, a fully charged secondary power cell could run with no further charging from 30 days to 3,175 days (8.7 years), though most Eco-Drive men's watch models offer a six-month power reserve. If kept from light for an extended period, some Eco-Drive movement models can hibernate, where the hands of the watch stop and the internal quartz movement continues to track the correct time. When subsequently exposed to sufficient light, the hands move automatically (without human intervention) to the proper positions and resume regular timekeeping.

=== Temperature difference as power source ===
Citizen Eco-Drive Thermo watches were introduced in 1999 and use the temperature difference between the wearer's arm and the surrounding environment as a power source. The rare Eco-Drive Thermo watches use the Seebeck effect to generate thermo electricity that powers the electronic movement and charges the secondary power cell. In the sun or in the tropics the ambient temperature can come close to or exceed the temperature of the wearer's wrist causing the watch to stop generating thermo electricity. In case no power is generated, an Eco-Drive Thermo movement will save power by moving the second hand in ten second increments until the production of thermo electricity is resumed. Citizen has stopped making Eco-Drive Thermo watches.

=== Hybrid Eco-Drive movements ===
Citizen also built an automatic quartz powered watch, the Citizen Promaster Eco-Duo Drive (released in December 1998). Novel to this watch was the use of both mechanical power as well as a solar cell to power the electronic movement and charge the secondary power cell. This model was an attempt to enter higher-priced markets (at a cost of around US$1,000). The Eco-Duo Drive technology failed to attract consumer interest and Citizen has since stopped making use of the unique movement.

=== Solar cell and secondary battery life expectancy ===
According to Citizen, experimental data showed the solar cell and secondary battery will last for more than 10 years. According to Citizen Europe, laboratory tests showed that after 20 years the secondary battery retains a power storage capacity of 80% of its initial capacity. Newer Citizen claims state the rechargeable/secondary batteries will last up to 40 years and that it is highly unusual for these batteries to fail. These rechargeable/secondary batteries last significantly longer than a typical quartz-watch battery, but when stored, attention must be given to keep the rechargeable/secondary batteries in Eco-Drive watches sufficiently energized to ensure a long-lasting correctly functioning movement.

== Maintenance ==
For water resistant and diving Eco-Drive watches Citizen recommends a watch gasket exchange every 2 or 3 years to preserve their water resistance because watch gaskets, which form a watertight seal, degrade as they age. Further, Citizen recommends maintenance for Eco-Drive watch movements in regular intervals in order to extend the life of the watch movement, since the gears used in running watch movements are subject to slow wear. Citizen states that when their lubricants for Long-Lasting Precision Equipment are used in watches, timepiece movements remain smooth for a long time as the oil does not harden even after 20 years.

== Gallery ==
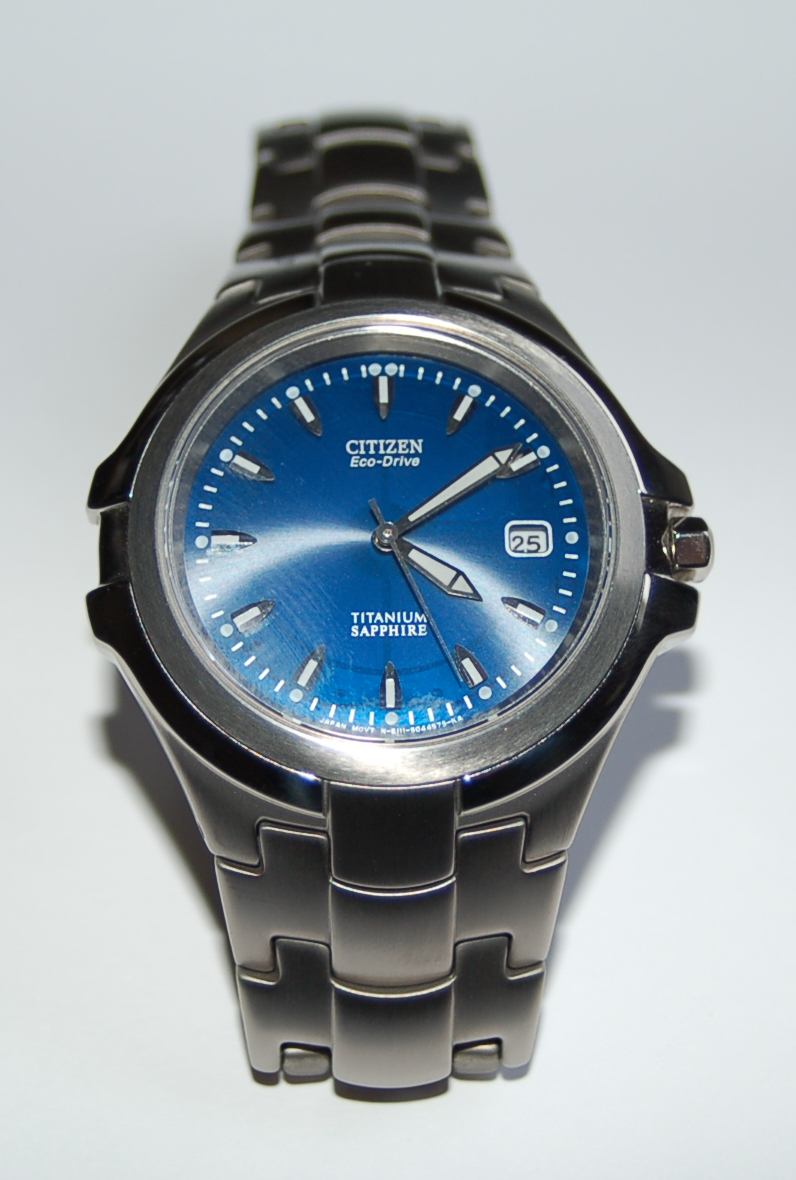
Citizen Eco-Drive Marinaut Titanium Sapphire BM1290-54L

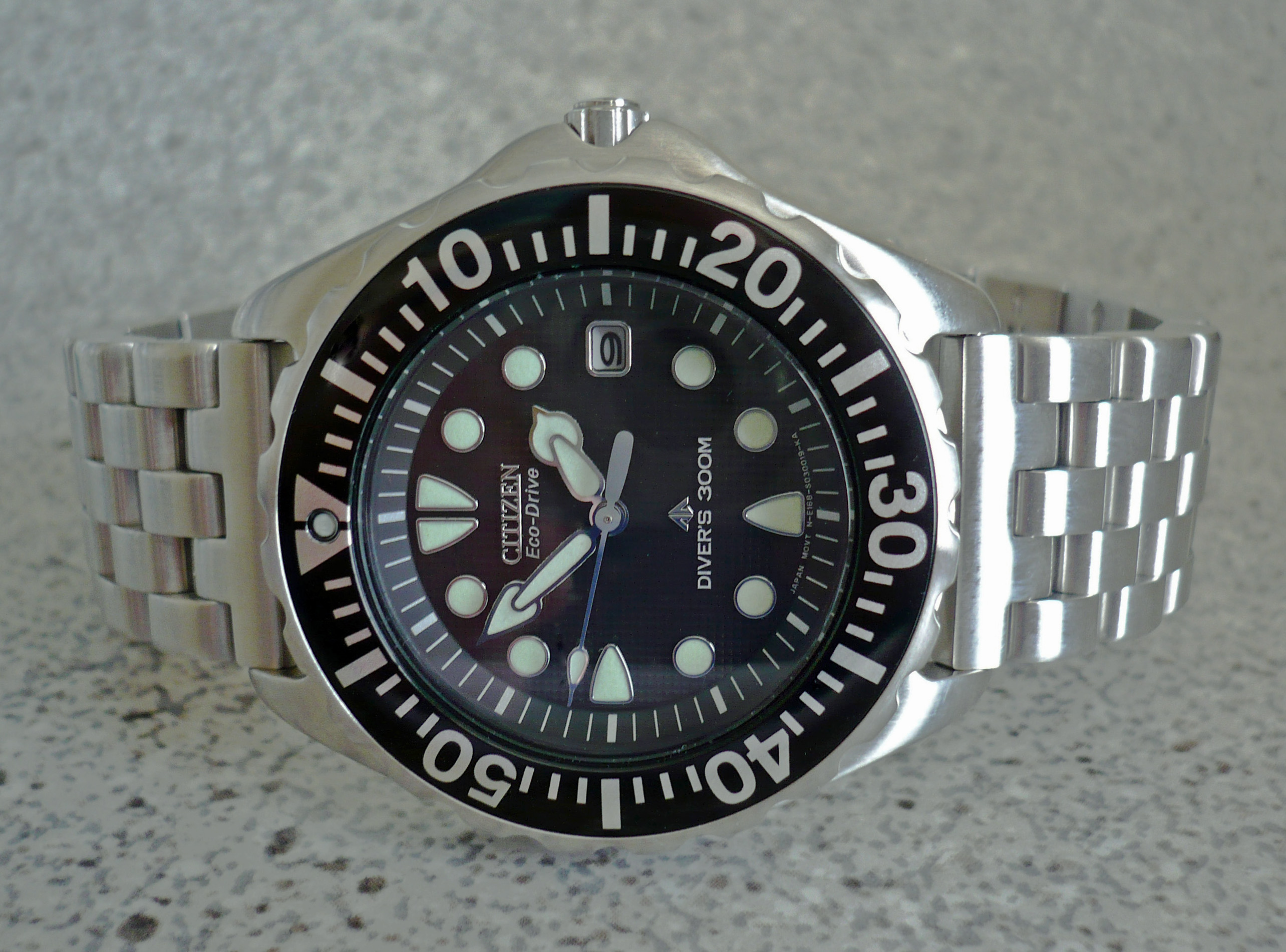
Citizen Promaster Eco-Drive BN0000-04H Diver's 300 m

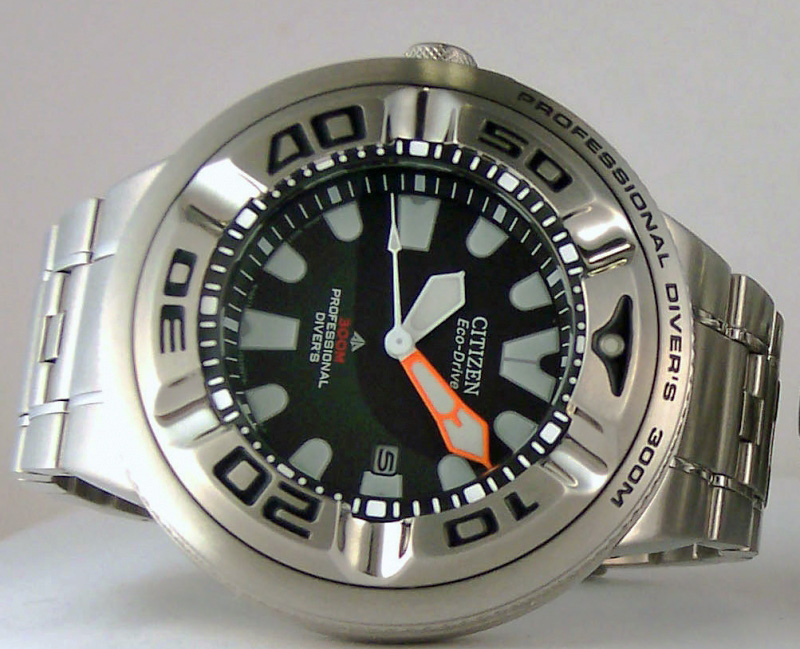
Citizen Promaster Eco-Drive BJ8050-08E Diver's 300 m

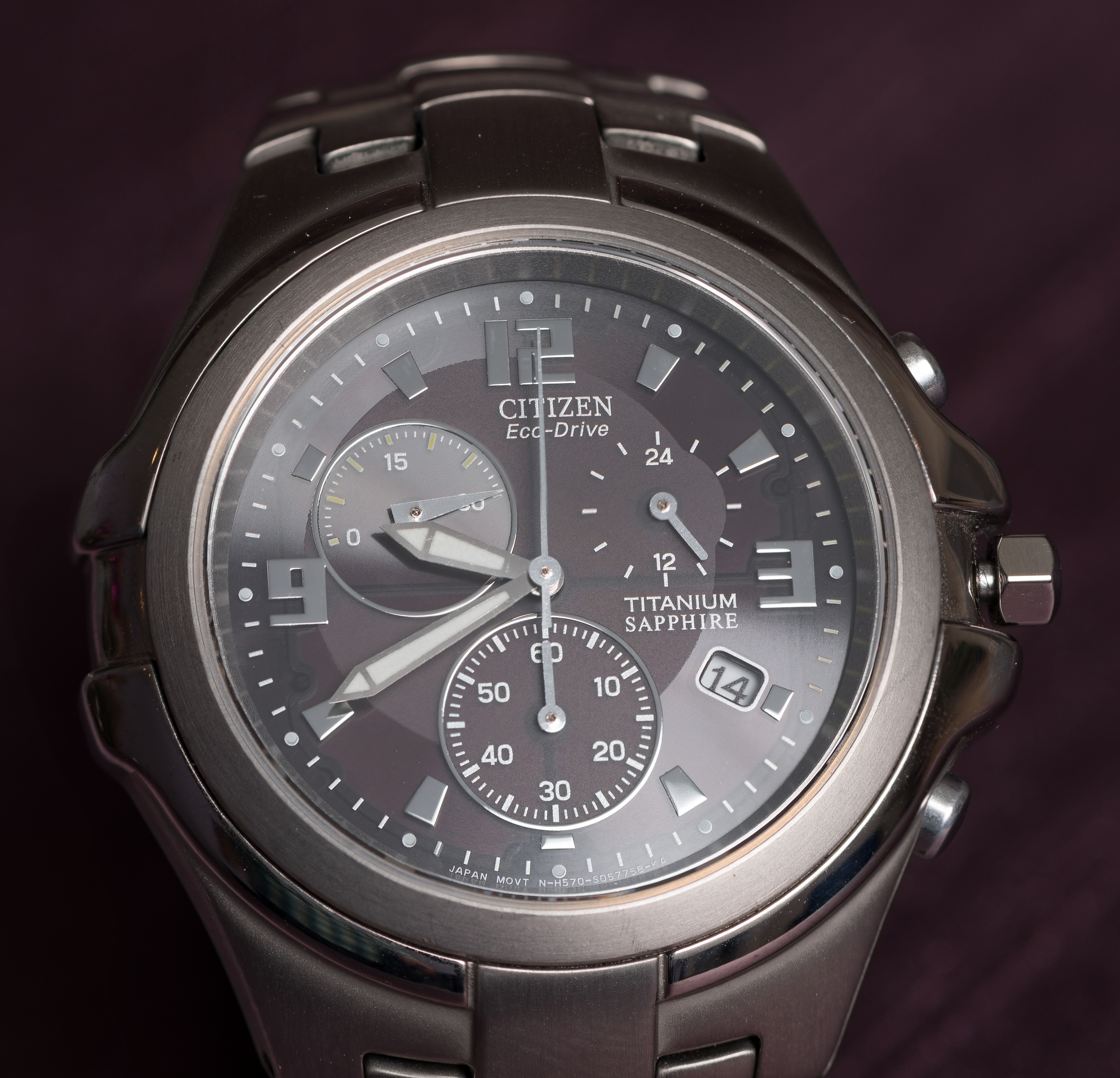
Citizen Eco-Drive Titanium Sapphire AT1100-55F

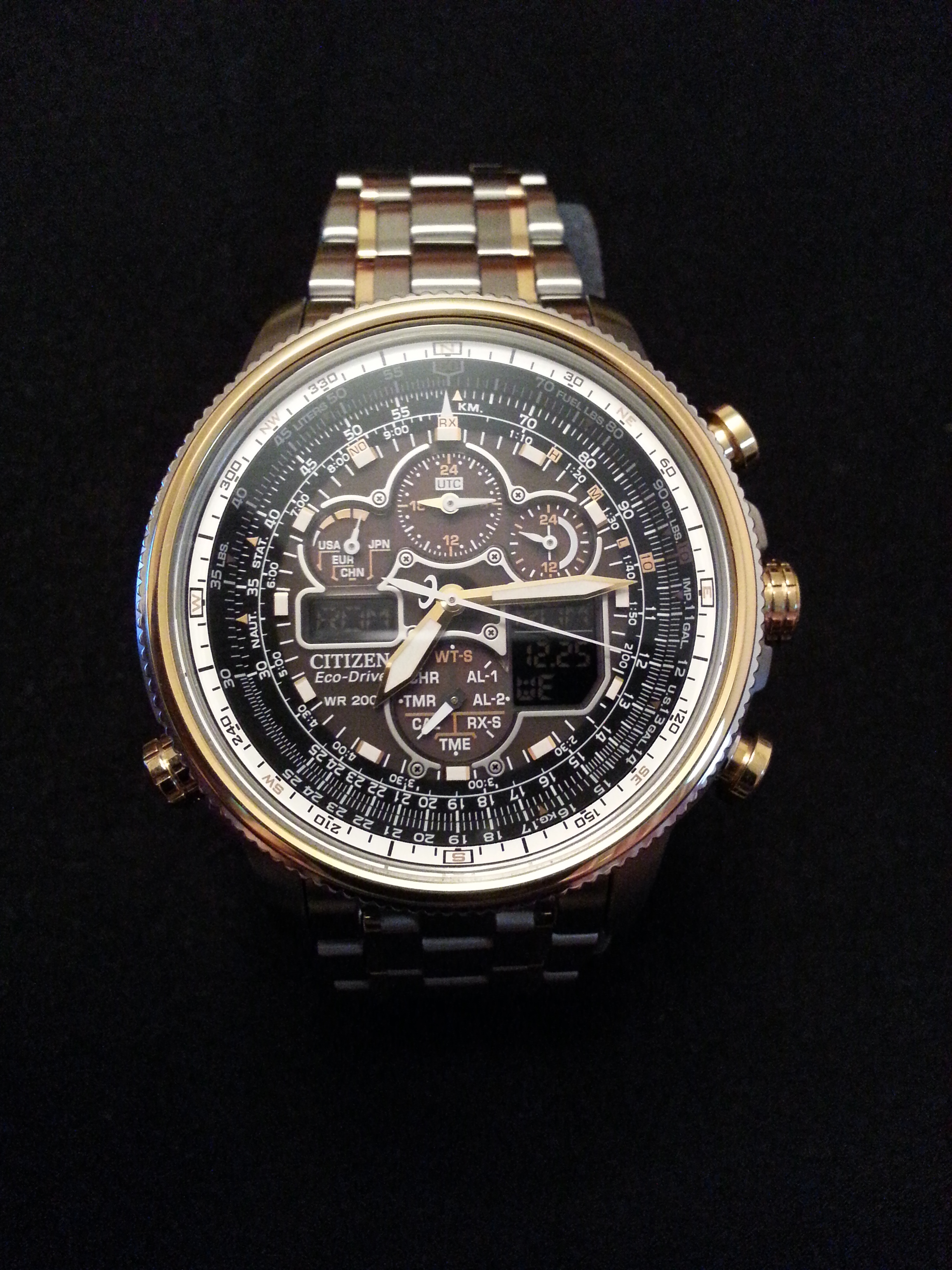
Citizen Eco-Drive JY8034-58E Navihawk A-T analog-digital chronograph

== See also ==
- Watch
- Solar powered watch
