= Filip Tysander =

Swedish businessman and entrepreneur (born 1985)

- Born: John Filip Tysander; 25 January 1985 (age 41); Järfälla, Sweden
- Education: Uppsala University
- Occupations: Businessman; Entrepreneur
- Years active: 2011–present
- Known for: Founder of Daniel Wellington

John Filip Tysander (born 25 January 1985) is a Swedish businessman and entrepreneur who founded the watch brand Daniel Wellington in 2011.

== Biography ==
After graduating from high school, Tysander ran an online retail business with a necktie and plastic watch web shop. He studied business at Uppsala University. In 2006, when Tysander was backpacking in Australia, he claims to have met a traveler by the name of Daniel Wellington who was wearing a Rolex Submariner on a classic NATO strap. The simplicity of the watch allegedly inspired Tysander to create his own watch brand, named after the Englishman he claimed to have met. However, no real evidence of this story ever taking place has ever been presented.

Tysander launched the Daniel Wellington brand after he had graduated from university and also spent five years working in the watch industry via his old online business, Neptune Design. Daniel Wellington grew due to its online advertising strategy and campaigns through social media. Tysander invested $15,000 to start the Daniel Wellington brand. The watches are simple and minimalist. In 2011, he sold the first Daniel Wellington Watch. By 2014, Daniel Wellington had sold over one million watches and made $70 million in revenue. In 2016, Daniel Wellington made US$230 million in revenue and $111.5 million in profit. Tysander still maintains 100% ownership of the company.

In 2015, Tysander won the 'Male Star of The Year' Award in the Ernst & Young Sweden Entrepreneur of the Year Awards. He acquired the most expensive penthouse in Stockholm during 2016; purchasing it for $12.8 million. According to Veckans Affärer, Tysander planned to make a major SEK50 million investment in Klarna in 2017.

As of 2019, Tysander has an estimated net worth of 2.4 billion SEK (US$300 million). According to Fokus magazine, he prefers to keep a low profile and avoids most media appearances.

== See also ==
- Daniel Wellington
