= Roger W. Riehl =

Inventor of the first solar-powered wristwatch

Roger William Riehl (December 25, 1935 – February 16, 2005) was an American inventor noted for his work in electronics — in particular, the "Synchronar": the first solar-powered wristwatch.

== Early life ==
From an early age Riehl was interested in electronics and gadgetry in general. He demonstrated an aptitude for electronics when he taught himself how to repair television sets at the age of 11. At the age of 15 he designed and built a pinball machine in the basement of his parents’ house which won the 1950 9th grade grand prize at the 3rd annual Herkimer Science Congress at North School in Herkimer, New York. At age 16 he designed and assembled an electronic football field scoreboard that was made from junk and discarded parts that included old electric train transformers, six soup cans, damper motors from heat control systems, wire from coin machines and a curtain rod. This feat won him a first prize in the 1952 Whitesboro Central School physics competition.

At age 18, Riehl wrote a paper titled, “The Electronic Regulation of the Audible Spectrum.” This paper and his demonstration of equipment which included a record player, electrical meters and vacuum tubes won the grand prize in the Chemistry-Biology-Physics contest at Whitesboro Central School in 1953. He also participated (in 1952 and 1953) in the State Science Congress sponsored by the New York State Science Teachers Association for Future Scientists of America.

== Career History ==
In adulthood Riehl was a self-taught engineer. He honed his electronic and design skills at various companies before taking on the personal challenge of designing and constructing a digital solar-powered wristwatch. From 1954 to 1957 he worked as a television repairman and built custom hi-fi sound systems in the Utica, New York area. In 1958 he moved to Cincinnati, Ohio and worked at a cousin's television appliance business as a television repairman. It was in 1959 that he first got the idea for a digital solar-powered wristwatch after he realized how military devices were utilizing integrated circuits (ICs).

In 1960 he worked at the Dayton Aviation Radio Equipment (DARE Electronics, Inc.) as an engineer working on 2-way FM radio development. While at DARE he flew worldwide as a flight crew member testing navigation equipment for Air Force and Naval applications. He also obtained the FCC Second Class Technical license in 1960. He started a company called Riehl Engineering in 1960 working out of a room in his home. It was here that he first started working on his idea to design a digital solar-powered wristwatch device. He also designed and marketed a transistor ignition system called Spitfire This device claimed to keep an automobile engine in proper timing (up to ten times longer), and to increase horsepower by 20%.

Throughout the mid to late-1960s he explored many ideas related to solar power devices and how to design a wristwatch with an electronic digital display that would work by storing energy in a solar cell. He operated Riehl Engineering until late in 1964. Then, in 1965 he opened the Riehl Electronics Corporation (REC) in an industrial building in Troy, Ohio. This company made and distributed various electronic products including the MagneTach Tachometer/Dwell Meter, and heat sinks.

Riehl was also busy working on his solar-powered wristwatch concept and was able to complete various prototypes (during the period from 1968 to 1972). Prototypes, and the production models, did not look like traditional wristwatches (except insofar as they were worn on the wrist) as they had a “Space Age” appearance which made the concept even more revolutionary.

From 1969 through 1970 he worked as an Electronics Engineer at Hobart Manufacturing in Dayton, Ohio. It was here that he was instrumental in the design of the first digital delicatessen weighing scale. He continued to work on his designs and testing of his digital solar-powered wristwatch concept in addition to his responsibilities at Hobart.

In 1970 he returned full-time to the Riehl Electronics Corporation to bring his dream of a digital solar-powered wristwatch to reality. In 1971 Riehl began selling stock in the Riehl Electronics Corporation to fund the digital solar-powered wristwatch project.

From late 1971 to early in 1972 Riehl completed a working prototype of a digital solar-powered wristwatch that included two slider control switches on the top of the case. This slider control design passed all of his intense water-proof testing and was soon ready to be released for sale to the public.

== Release of the Synchronar ==
In 1972 Riehl completed the first production-ready digital solar-powered wristwatch that featured CMOS circuits of his own design.

In 1974 Riehl joined Ragen Semiconductor, Inc. in Whippany, New Jersey as the Vice-President of Operations (for the Synchronar Solar-Powered Wristwatch product). Riehl became President in 1975. Starting in 1974 and continuing into 1976 Ragen Semiconductor manufactured and marketed the Synchronar.

== Economic Issues ==
Late in 1976 Ragen Semiconductor, Inc. discontinued operations, due to the then-ongoing quartz crisis. Riehl purchased all inventory and equipment associated with Synchronar production and started a new company in Whippany, NJ in 1977 that he named Riehl Time Corporation (RTC).

On September 29, 1983 RTC filed for Chapter 11 bankruptcy. In late 1984 RTC completely ceased operations and closed their doors. Riehl was able to acquire the assets from RTC and in 1985 he launched a new company called Custom Circuits Corporation (CCC). He continued to produce the Synchronar wristwatch at CCC, but in very limited quantities. In addition to his work at CCC Riehl worked as a technical consultant for Machine Technology Inc. in Parsippany, NJ from 1986 through 1987. One of his accomplishments while at Machine Technology was a special balancing chuck he designed to enable proper alignment for wafer manufacturing.

Despite numerous economic issues Riehl encountered he pressed on and challenged the wristwatch industry with new ideas and concepts and continued working on improving the Synchronar wristwatch design up to his death in 2005.

== Other Achievements ==
Riehl was instrumental in many additional innovations in electronic timekeeping related to wristwatches including: smart calendar programming, owner-controlled calibration, automatic adjustment to daylight saving time, automatic adjustments for leap year, perpetual calendars, and the first LED digital electronic wristwatch to be waterproof to a depth of 750 feet.
