= Frank Sinatra School of the Arts =

Art school in New York City

Coordinates: 40°45′22″N 73°55′31″W

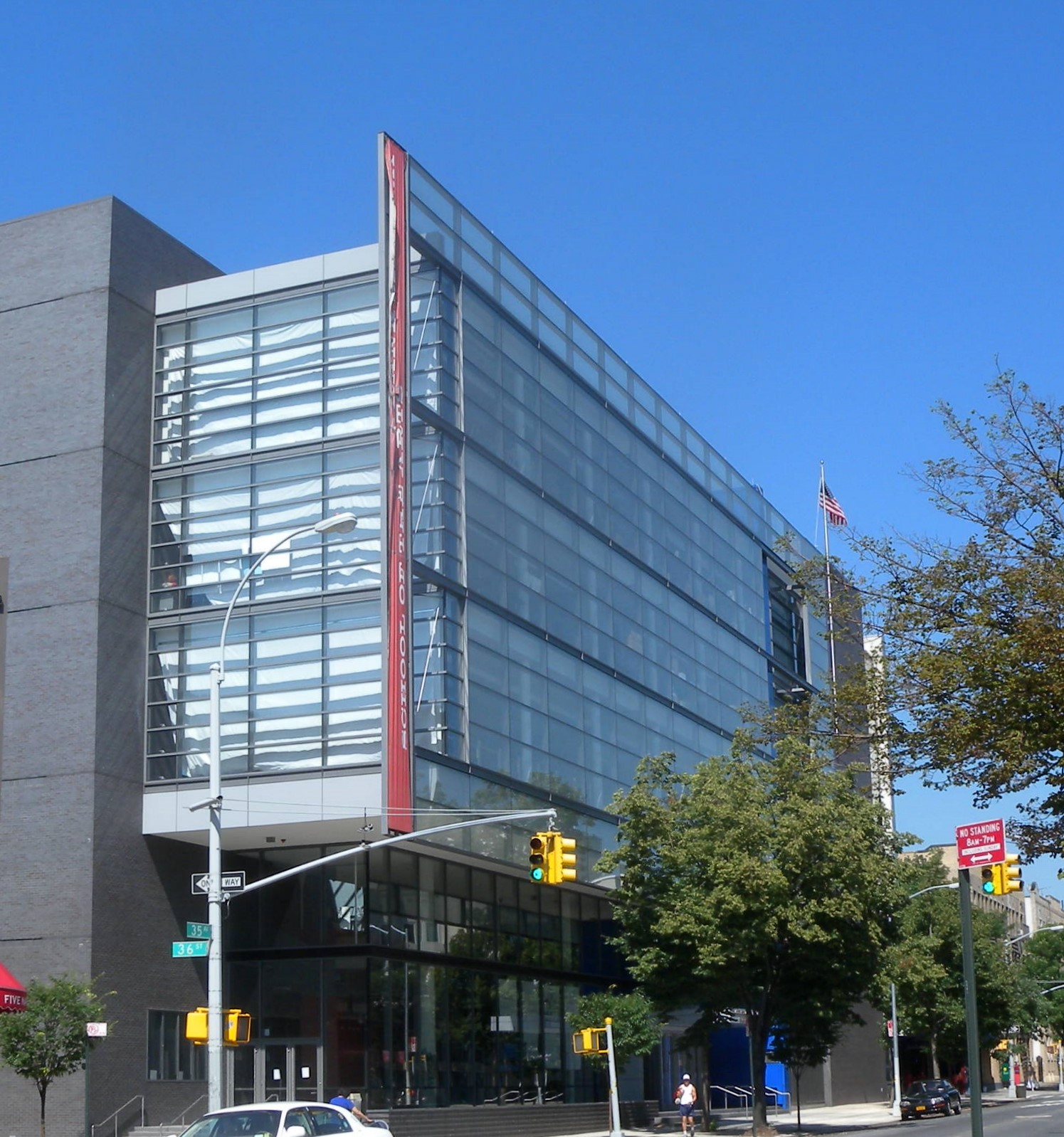

Location
- 35-12 35th Avenue; Astoria, New York 11106; United States

Information
- Founded: September 2001
- Founder: Tony Bennett
- Principal: Gideon Frankel
- Staff: 58.00 (FTE)
- Enrollment: 839 (2022-23)
- Student to teacher ratio: 14.47
- Colors: Blue and Orange
- Website: http://franksinatraschoolofthearts.org/

The Frank Sinatra School of the Arts (FSSA) is an arts high school in Astoria, Queens, and it is affiliated with the New York City Department of Education. The school, founded by Tony Bennett, is a major arts high school in New York City offering high school diplomas in six arts majors including fine art, dance, vocal and instrumental music, drama, and film. Each studio has its own dedicated teachers, classrooms, ensembles, and performances/exhibitions where students may showcase their work to the public. All students must audition for admission. Students in every Studio/Major are also allowed to audition for the Musical Theatre elective class, which in the past has put on performances such as The King and I, Anything Goes, Titanic: The Musical, The Secret Garden, Carousel, Footloose the musical, Little Shop of Horrors, Jonathan Larson's RENT, Aida, The Music Man, Ragtime, The Phantom of the Opera, Hairspray, and Sweeney Todd: The Demon Barber of Fleet Street. Students can also apply for the Stage Craft class as an elective in their class schedule that teaches the students to work as a crew member for various shows throughout the season, including roles such as PSM, ASM, LBO, A1 (etc.)

The school has an enrollment of approximately 853 students; the student to teacher ratio is 18:1. In comparison to New York City public high schools, this school holds one of the highest graduation rates in the district. In 2009, 96% of the senior class graduated with 97% enrolled for college. The class of 2009 additionally completed 17,000 hours of community service while at FSSA. The class of 2013 completed 20,000 hours of community service and its members, as a whole, were granted approximately $120,000 worth of scholarship money. The school had two students win the Posse Foundation scholarship in the class of 2013.

== History ==
The Frank Sinatra School of the Arts, also known as FSSA, was founded in 2001 by singer Tony Bennett along with his wife Susan Benedetto, and is named after the American musician and actor Frank Sinatra. The school was funded through a non-profit organization called Exploring the Arts (ETA). FSSA started out in the DeVry building over at LaGuardia Community College then moved to the C building. It is now located in its own state of the art building near Kaufman Astoria Studios and Museum of the Moving Image.
