= Citizen Watch =

Japanese precision-equipment manufacturer

Citizen Watch Co., Ltd.

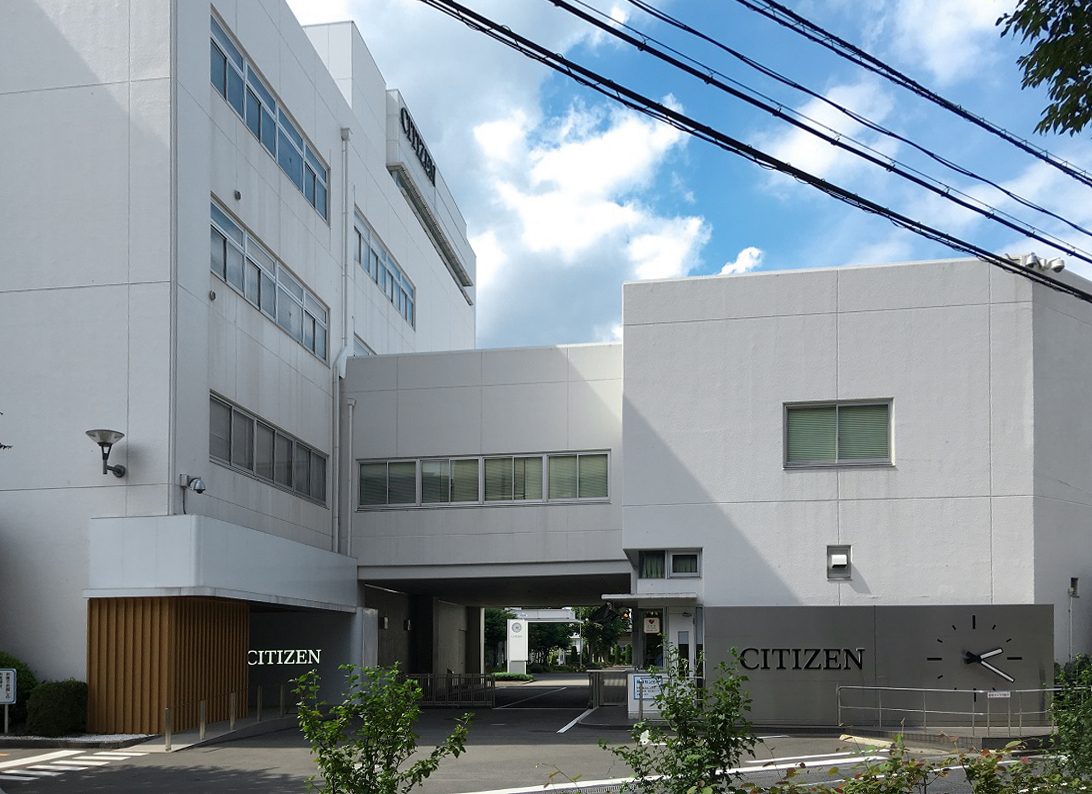
- Headquarters and Tokyo Works in Nishitōkyō, Tokyo
- Native name: シチズン時計株式会社
- Romanized name: Shichizun Tokei Kabushiki-gaisha
- Formerly: Dainippon Watch Co., Ltd. (1938–1948); Citizen Holdings Co., Ltd. (2007–2016)
- Type: Public
- Traded as: TYO: 7762; JPX-Nikkei Index 400 constituent
- Industry: Precision equipment
- Predecessor: Shokosha Watch Research Institute
- Founded: 1918; 108 years ago (predecessor); May 28, 1930; 96 years ago (company)
- Founder: Kamekichi Yamazaki
- Headquarters: 6-1-12 Tanashi-chō, Nishitōkyō, Tokyo, Japan
- Key people: Yoshitaka Oji (Note: Japanese: 大治良高) (president and CEO)
- Products: Watches; watch movements; machine tools; automotive components; electronic devices; printers; health-care equipment
- Revenue: ¥346.808 billion (fiscal year ended 31 March 2026)
- Operating income: ¥30.250 billion (fiscal year ended 31 March 2026)
- Net income: ¥31.100 billion (fiscal year ended 31 March 2026)
- Total assets: ¥468.303 billion (31 March 2026)
- Number of employees: 12,147 (consolidated; 31 March 2026)
- Subsidiaries: Bulova; Frédérique Constant; Citizen Machinery; Citizen Finedevice; Citizen Electronics; Citizen Systems Japan
- Website: www.citizen.co.jp/global

Citizen Watch Co., Ltd. (シチズン時計株式会社, Shichizun Tokei Kabushiki-gaisha) is a Japanese precision-equipment manufacturer and an operating holding company of the Citizen Group. Headquartered in Nishitōkyō, Tokyo, it is listed on the Prime Market of the Tokyo Stock Exchange and is a constituent of the JPX-Nikkei Index 400. The group reports three principal business segments: watches, machine tools, and devices and components.

The company traces its origins to the Shokosha Watch Research Institute, established by Kamekichi Yamazaki in 1918, and was incorporated as Citizen Watch Co., Ltd. in 1930. The group owns watchmakers and brands including Bulova, Frédérique Constant, Alpina, Arnold & Son and Angelus. Within the Citizen watch brand, its principal premium and specialist collections include The Citizen, Campanola, Attesa, Promaster, Series8, xC and Tsuyosa.

Citizen developed the light-powered Eco-Drive system, while its Miyota operations supply quartz and mechanical movements to watch manufacturers worldwide. Beyond watches, the group manufactures computer numerical control automatic lathes under the Cincom and Miyano brands, as well as automotive components, quartz devices, ceramics, small motors, LEDs, printers and health-care equipment.

== History ==
=== Founding and early development ===
Kamekichi Yamazaki was a watch and precious-metals merchant who sought to establish domestic watch production in Japan. In 1918, he founded the Shokosha Watch Research Institute, the predecessor of Citizen Watch. The institute initially assembled watches from imported Swiss components, but subsequently introduced European machine tools to manufacture parts in-house. It also established an educational institution to train watchmakers.

The institute completed its first pocket watch in December 1924. According to Citizen's corporate account, the name "Citizen" was proposed by Gotō Shinpei, then mayor of Tokyo City and an acquaintance of Yamazaki, in the hope that the watch would be widely used and appreciated by ordinary citizens.

After the Shokosha institute encountered financial difficulties, Ryoichi Suzuki, who had managed a watch-assembly operation associated with the Swiss watch merchant Rodolphe Schmid, proposed acquiring its equipment. In May 1930, Citizen Watch Co., Ltd. was established by Yamazaki, Yosaburo Nakajima and Suzuki. Yamazaki became chairman, Nakajima became the first president, and Suzuki was placed in charge of the factory.

Citizen completed its first wristwatch in 1931. During the mid-1930s, it established the Tanashi factory, which became its principal manufacturing base. (Note: Citizen's securities report dates the establishment of the Tanashi factory to June 1935, while the company's general corporate history gives May 1936.) Machine-tool production also began during this period. (Note: Citizen's business pages date the beginning of machine-tool production to 1936, while its corporate chronology states that production began following the merger with Nitto Seiki Co., Ltd. in July 1941.) The company was renamed Dainippon Watch Co., Ltd. in 1938 and resumed the Citizen Watch name in 1948.

Citizen was listed on the Tokyo Stock Exchange in 1949. During the post-war period, the company expanded its watch-component manufacturing through affiliated factories in Japan. Heiwa Tokei Seisakusho was established in Iida, Nagano, in 1949, and a component-manufacturing company was established in Miyota, Nagano, in 1959. The latter developed into the Miyota movement-manufacturing operation.

=== Expansion and diversification ===
Citizen introduced a calendar-equipped wristwatch in 1952, which the company describes as the first Japanese-made model of its type. Exports of wristwatches began in 1955, and in 1960 Citizen entered an import-export agreement with the American watch company Bulova.

The group began external sales of machine tools in 1961. Citizen subsequently diversified into business machines, electronic components and health-care products. In 1966, it released the X8, described in the company's product history as Japan's first domestically produced electronic wristwatch. In 1970, it developed the Cincom computer-numerically-controlled automatic lathe.

Citizen introduced its first quartz wristwatch in 1973. In 1976, it released the Crystron Solar Cell, which the company describes as the world's first analogue quartz wristwatch powered by a solar cell. The technology became the basis of the later Eco-Drive system.

During the 1980s, Citizen expanded into printers, LEDs and electronic thermometers. The company also developed sensor-equipped watches, diving watches and watches capable of recording sound. In 1993, it introduced a multi-station radio-controlled wristwatch, and in the mid-1990s began marketing its solar-charging watch technology under the Eco-Drive name.

In 1990, Citizen established the Citizen of the Year award to recognise people whose activities contributed to social progress and inspired other citizens.

Citizen moved its headquarters from the Shinjuku Mitsui Building to the Tanashi site in Nishitōkyō in 2001.

=== Holding-company restructuring and acquisitions ===
In April 2007, Citizen adopted a pure holding-company structure. The existing company was renamed Citizen Holdings Co., Ltd., while the watch business was transferred to a newly established operating company named Citizen Watch Co., Ltd.

Citizen acquired Bulova Corporation in 2008. In 2012, it acquired Prothor Holding SA, whose subsidiaries included the Swiss movement manufacturer Manufacture La Joux-Perret and the watch brands Arnold & Son and Angelus. The acquisition formed part of Citizen's expansion into higher-priced mechanical watches.

In 2016, the group acquired Frédérique Constant Holding SA, bringing the Frédérique Constant, Alpina and Ateliers deMonaco brands under Citizen ownership.

In October 2016, Citizen Holdings absorbed the watch operating company and Citizen Business Expert Co., Ltd. The surviving company was renamed Citizen Watch Co., Ltd., changing the group from a pure holding-company structure to an operating holding-company structure centred on the watch business.

=== Recent developments ===
Citizen moved from the First Section of the Tokyo Stock Exchange to its Prime Market in April 2022 following the exchange's market restructuring.

Yoshitaka Oji became president and CEO in April 2025.

== Businesses ==
From the fiscal year ended 31 March 2026, the Citizen Group reported three business segments. Watches generated external net sales of ¥197.061 billion, machine tools ¥86.292 billion, and devices and components ¥63.455 billion.

=== Watches ===
The watch segment produces finished watches, movements and related components. The group owns independent watchmakers and brands including Bulova, Frédérique Constant, Alpina, Arnold & Son and Angelus. Within the Citizen brand, its collections include The Citizen, Campanola, Attesa, Promaster, Series8, xC, Citizen L and Tsuyosa.

==== Eco-Drive and precision timekeeping ====
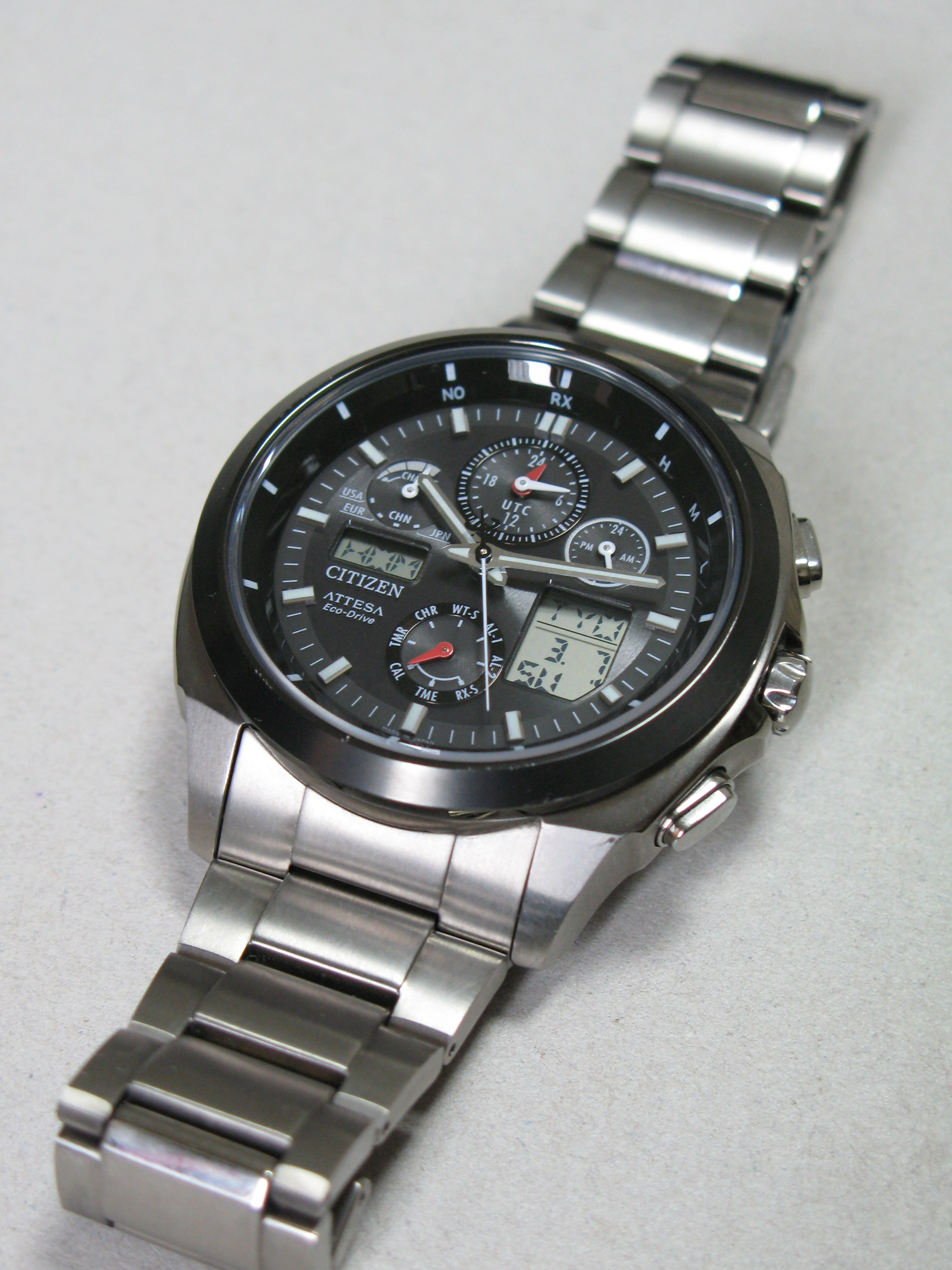
Citizen Attesa Eco-Drive ATV53-3023 radio-controlled chronograph

Eco-Drive is Citizen's light-powered watch system. Light passing through or around the dial is converted into electricity and stored in a rechargeable cell. The system developed from the solar-powered watches introduced by Citizen during the 1970s, and the Eco-Drive name was adopted during the mid-1990s. In 1996, an Eco-Drive watch became the first wristwatch to receive Japan's Eco Mark.

Citizen combined Eco-Drive with radio-controlled timekeeping and, in 2011, introduced the Eco-Drive Satellite Wave, which received time information from navigation satellites. In 2016, it released the Eco-Drive One, whose light-powered movement was 1 mm thick and whose complete case was 2.98 mm thick.

In 2018, Citizen announced the Caliber 0100, a light-powered quartz movement specified to an annual accuracy of ±1 second without correction from radio or satellite signals. It uses an AT-cut quartz oscillator operating at 8,388,608 Hz. Wristwatches using the movement were released in 2019 under The Citizen line.

==== Miyota movements ====
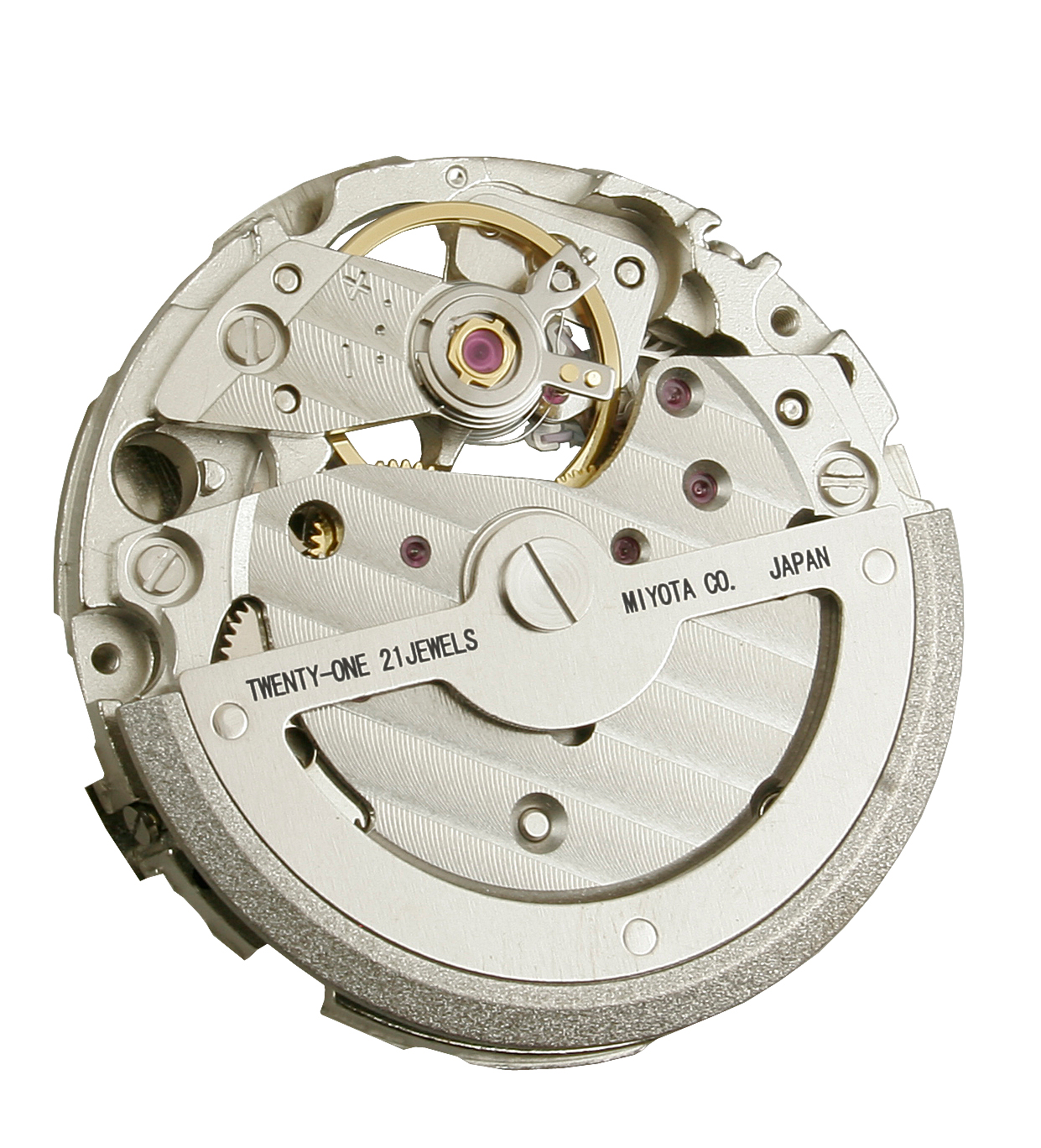
A movement supplied under the Miyota brand

Miyota is the brand used by the Citizen Group for movements supplied to other watch manufacturers. It takes its name from the town of Miyota, Nagano, where Citizen established a component-manufacturing operation in 1959. The Miyota name was adopted for external movement sales in 1980.

Miyota supplies movements on a non-exclusive basis to watch companies worldwide, including companies that compete with Citizen in the finished-watch market. In 2023, Europa Star described Miyota as one of the principal global manufacturers of watch movements and estimated its annual production at approximately 100 million units, more than 90 per cent of which were quartz movements.

Its widely used products include the 2035 quartz family, the 8000-series automatic movements and the thinner 9000-series mechanical movements.

==== The Citizen ====
The Citizen was introduced in 1995 as a premium line marking the company's 65th anniversary. Early quartz models were rated to an annual accuracy of ±5 seconds and were sold with a ten-year warranty.

In 2010, the line added its first automatic mechanical model with an in-house movement. An Eco-Drive model rated to ±5 seconds per year followed in 2011, and Citizen began using Japanese washi paper for some Eco-Drive dials in 2017. The Caliber 0100 watches released in 2019 extended the line's stated accuracy to ±1 second per year.

==== Campanola ====
Campanola is a high-end Citizen watch brand launched in 2000. Its design concept draws on astronomical imagery and on the idea of experiencing the passage of time rather than treating a watch solely as a measuring instrument. The name refers to the historical association between bells in the Italian region of Campania and the public marking of time.

The first Campanola models combined quartz movements with complications including chronographs, perpetual calendars, minute repeaters and moon-phase displays. The Cosmosign collection, introduced in 2001, displays astronomical information and rotating star charts. Other models use Japanese urushi lacquer and related decorative techniques.

In 2014, Campanola introduced mechanical watches using movements supplied by Citizen subsidiary La Joux-Perret. The brand later added tourbillon models and limited works combining Swiss mechanical movements with Japanese lacquer decoration.

==== Promaster and diving watches ====
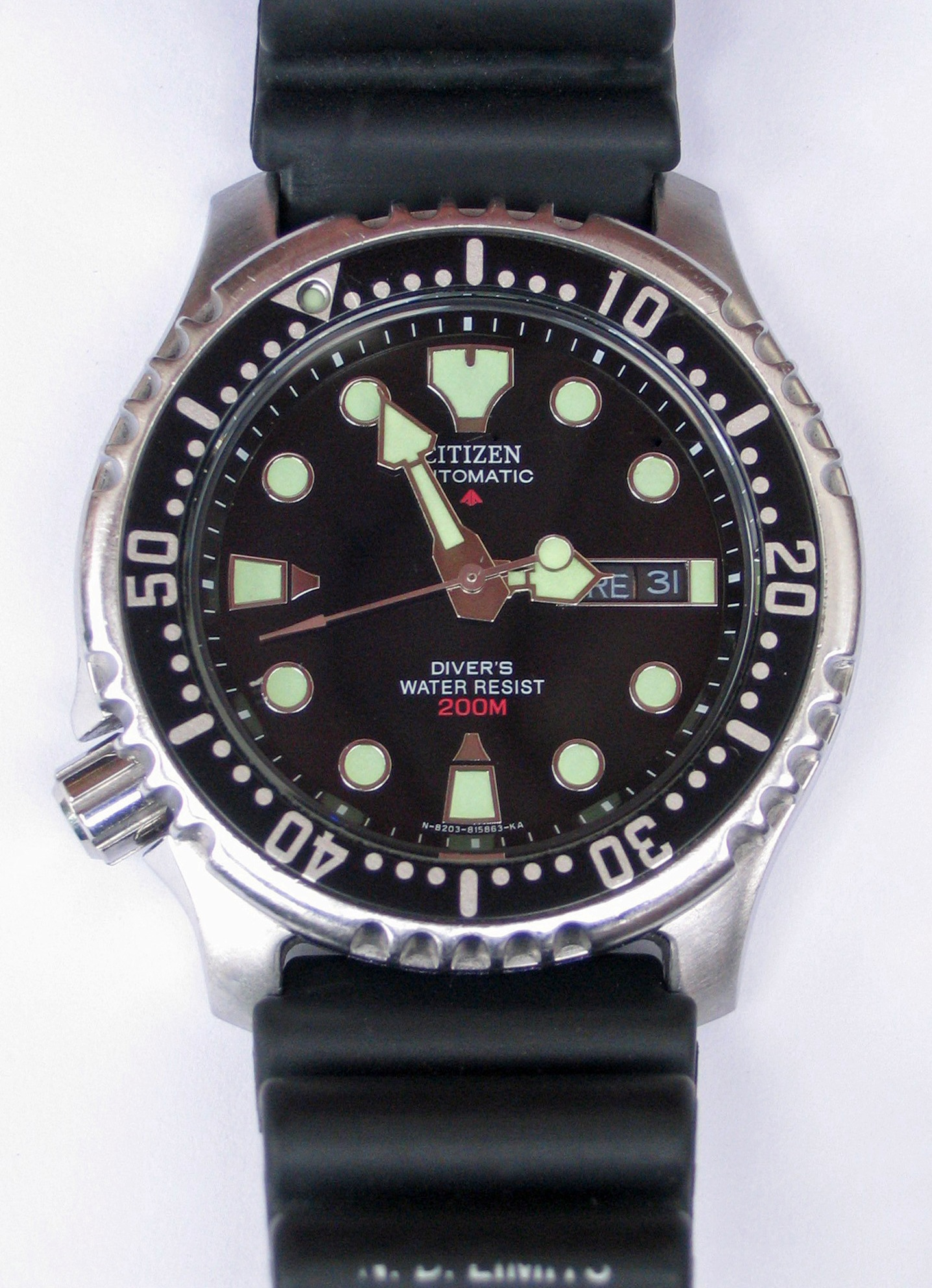
Citizen Promaster Automatic NY0040 diving watch

Citizen introduced the Parawater in 1959, describing it as Japan's first fully water-resistant wristwatch. Its later professional diving watches included the Professional Diver 1300m of 1982 and the Aqualand, which incorporated an electronic depth sensor.

The Promaster name was introduced in 1989 for watches intended for marine, aviation and land use. Automatic diving watches in the NY004 series became informally known as "Fugu", or pufferfish, because of the alternating smooth and serrated shape of their bezels. Citizen subsequently adopted the nickname and a pufferfish emblem for later models.

==== Tsuyosa ====
Tsuyosa is an automatic mechanical watch line derived from the NH299 series that Citizen sold in China during the 1980s. Its design combines a steel case and integrated-style bracelet with brightly coloured dials and comparatively accessible pricing.

The line was introduced in Asian markets in 2021, Europe in 2022, and the United States and Japan in 2023. The watches were initially marketed primarily through reference numbers. The Tsuyosa nickname emerged among European consumers and was later adopted officially by Citizen. According to Toyo Keizai, the line had become the best-selling watch in Citizen's history by 2024 and attracted a younger customer base than the company's other principal collections.

==== Other Citizen collections ====
Other principal Citizen collections include the titanium-focused Attesa line, the Series8 mechanical range, and the women's xC and Citizen L collections. Citizen also markets lower-priced watches under the Q&Q, Q&Q SmileSolar, Reguno and Wicca names, as well as licensed watches for outside fashion brands.

==== Public clocks and time systems ====
Citizen T.I.C. supplies clock devices, time servers, digital signage, electronic scoreboards and other specialised systems. Its products include public clocks and systems used to synchronise time displays and networked equipment in stations, commercial buildings and public facilities.

=== Machine tools ===
The Citizen Group's machine-tool operations are conducted principally by Citizen Machinery Co., Ltd. The company manufactures computer-numerically-controlled automatic lathes under two principal brands: Cincom for sliding-headstock machines and Miyano for fixed-headstock machines. The equipment is used to manufacture precision components for the automotive, medical, electronics, semiconductor and aerospace industries.

The machine-tool business developed from equipment built to manufacture watch components. External sales began in 1961, and Citizen developed the Cincom CNC automatic lathe in 1970. Citizen Machinery and Miyano Machinery merged in 2011, and the combined company adopted the Citizen Machinery name in 2015.

One of the company's principal models, the Cincom L20, was introduced in 1990 and had achieved cumulative sales of more than 18,000 machines by 2023. Citizen Machinery also developed low-frequency vibration cutting, known as LFV, which periodically interrupts cutting to break chips into smaller pieces and was first commercialised in its automatic lathes in 2016.

=== Devices and components ===
The devices and components segment includes automotive components, quartz devices, ceramics, small motors, LEDs, printers and health-care products.

Citizen Finedevice manufactures precision metal components, principally for automobiles, as well as quartz devices, ceramics, microdisplays, combustion-pressure sensors and motors.

Citizen Electronics develops and manufactures electronic devices and applied products, including lighting LEDs, compact chip LEDs, optical sensors and tactile switches.

Citizen Systems Japan produces commercial printers, including receipt, label and photo printers, as well as blood-pressure monitors, thermometers and body-composition monitors.

== Management strategy ==
Under its Medium-term Management Plan 2027, covering fiscal years 2025 to 2027, Citizen identifies watches and machine tools as the group's core businesses. The plan calls for strengthening the profitability and global market position of those businesses while reviewing the devices and components portfolio according to the growth potential and competitiveness of its constituent operations.

== Citizen of the Year ==
Citizen Watch established the Citizen of the Year award in 1990. The award recognises Japanese nationals and foreign citizens residing in Japan whose activities have inspired other citizens or contributed to the development, well-being or improvement of their communities. Citizen describes the programme as an expression of its corporate philosophy, "Loved by citizens, working for citizens".

== Principal group companies ==
The Citizen Group includes manufacturing and sales companies in Japan, Europe, Asia and the Americas. Principal companies include:

=== Watches ===
- Citizen Watch Manufacturing Co., Ltd.
- Citizen T.I.C. Co., Ltd.
- Citizen Retail Planning Co., Ltd.
- Citizen Watch Company of America, Inc.
- Bulova Corporation
- Manufacture La Joux-Perret S.A.
- Manufacture Arnold & Son-Angelus SA
- Frédérique Constant Holding S.A.

=== Machine tools ===
- Citizen Machinery Co., Ltd.

=== Devices and components ===
- Citizen Finedevice Co., Ltd.
- Citizen Systems Japan Co., Ltd.
- Citizen Electronics Co., Ltd.
- Citizen Micro Co., Ltd.
- Citizen Chiba Precision Co., Ltd.

== Brand Ambassadors ==
Citizen has appointed numerous athletes and entertainers as brand ambassadors, including tennis players Victoria Azarenka and Naomi Osaka, rugby player Ayumu Goromaru, actor Takeshi Kaneshiro, and figure skater Yuzuru Hanyu.

== See also ==
- Casio
- Miyota (watch movement manufacturer)
- Orient Watch
- Seiko
