= Miyota (watch movement manufacturer) =

Japanese subsidiary of the Citizen Group

Miyota Precision Co., Ltd
- Native name: ミヨタ精密株式会社 (Miyota Precision Co., Ltd)
- Type: Private (subsidiary of Citizen Watch Group.)
- Industry: Watch movement manufacturing; Watch parts manufacturing
- Founded: 1959
- Successor: Citizen Miyota Co., Ltd
- Headquarters: Miyota, Nagano Prefecture, Japan
- Parent: Citizen Watch Co., Ltd.
- Website: https://miyotamovement.com/

Miyota is a brand of mechanical and quartz watch movements manufactured by Citizen Watch Manufacturing Co., Ltd. (CWMJ), a subsidiary of Citizen Watch.

In 1959 Miyota Precision Co., Ltd. was established in the town of Miyota, Nagano Prefecture, Japan as an assembly factory for wristwatches. The company renamed Miyota Co., Ltd. in 1991 and Citizen Miyota Co., Ltd. in 2005 and was merged with Citizen Finetech Co., Ltd. to form Citizen Finetech Miyota Co., Ltd. in 2008 and merged with Citizen Seimitsu Co., Ltd. to form Citizen Finedevice Co., Ltd. in 2015. The company produces watch parts such as crystal oscillators and bearing jewels, but its watch movement manufacturing business has been transferred to Citizen Watch Manufacturing Co., Ltd.

In 2016 a large movement assembly factory (CWMJ Miyota Saku Factory) in Saku, Nagano Prefecture was opened. Most watch brands do not make their own movements in-house, but rather use standard watch movements manufactured by specialized companies like Miyota and ETA SA.

== Products ==
=== Mechanical movements ===
Miyota produces various 'standard' and 'premium' grade mechanical movements for automatic wristwatches.

The Miyota 8215 is an entry level non-hacking-earlier versions twenty-one jewel three-hand with date automatic wristwatch movement with a uni-directional winding system (left rotation) with an accuracy of -20 to +40 seconds per day, and a power reserve of over 40 hours. It allows hand winding. The date window may be placed at the 3 o'clock position (cal. 8215-33A) or at 6 o'clock (cal. 8215-36A). The diameter of the movement is 26 mm and the thickness is 5.67 mm. It beats at 21,600 BPH or 3 Hz (6 half-cycles per second). The movement has a 49° lift angle.

The Miyota 9015 is a more sophisticated hacking twenty-four jewel three-hand with date automatic wristwatch movement with a uni-directional winding system (left rotation). The relatively slim height (3.90 mm thick, making it more suitable for thinner watch designs) 9015 automatic movement has a beat rate of 28,800 BPH (= 4 Hz), 51° lift angle, 24 jewels and features (automatic) winding, a ≥42 hours power reserve, manual winding and a hack function (stopping the movement of the second hand). The static accuracy rating is −10 to +30 seconds per day (23±2 °C).

=== Electric movements ===
Miyota also produces various electric driven movements for quartz watches. These are categorized in standard, slim, small, multi-function, chronograph, and small second chronograph movements.These movements are used by a variety of watch brands such as Timex, Casio, Bulova, MVMT and Skagen.

== 24-hour movements ==
=== Automatic movements ===
- Miyota Caliber 82S3: This automatic movement is a skeletonized option with a 24-hour indicator at the 9 o'clock position. The 24-hour hand moves with the main hands, functioning as a day/night or military time indicator.
- Miyota 8200 series: While the 82S3 is a specific example, other movements in the 8200 family can be adapted to include 24-hour functions, sometimes alongside other complications like a small seconds subdial (as seen in the 82S7).

=== Quartz movements ===
- Miyota Caliber 2415: This is a quartz movement that features a standard 24-hour display. It is a reliable, battery-powered option often found in watches that require high accuracy.

== Usage ==
Miyota movements are used by many watch makers besides Citizen for some of their watches, among them Xeric, Invicta, Boldr, Bulova, Bernhardt, Casio, Corgeut, HMT, BWC, Technos and Timex.

== Gallery ==
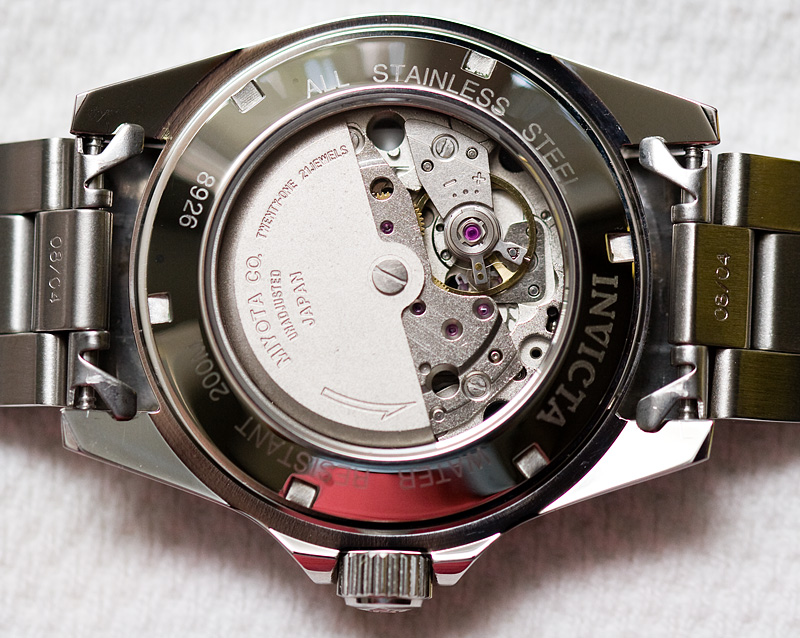
Miyota 8215 movement in an Invicta 8926.

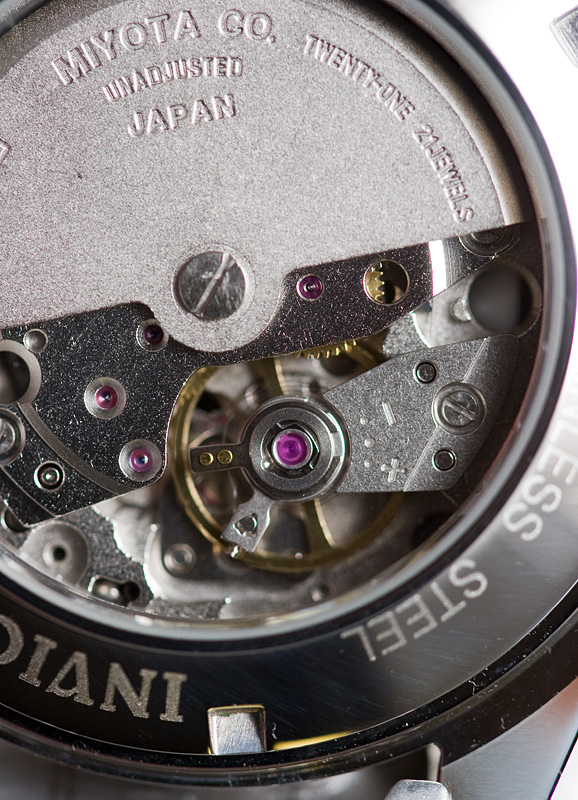
Miyota 8215 movement in an Invicta 8926, closeup.

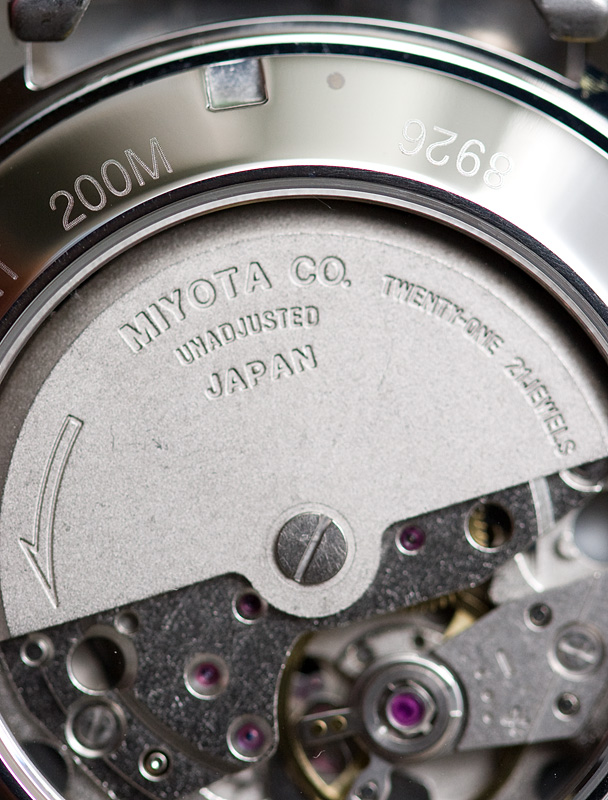
Miyota 8215 movement in an Invicta 8926, closeup.

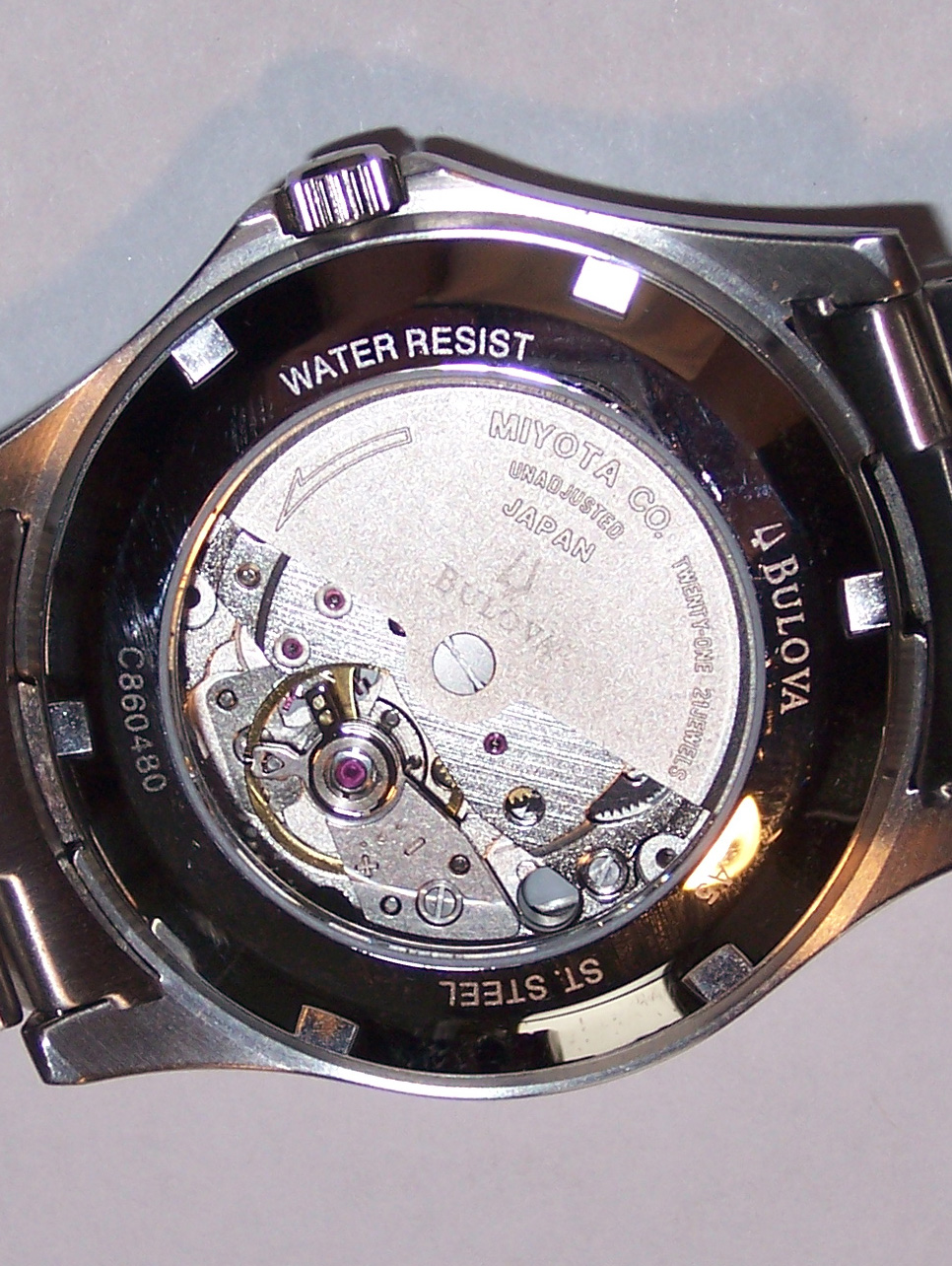
Miyota 8215 movement in a Bulova watch

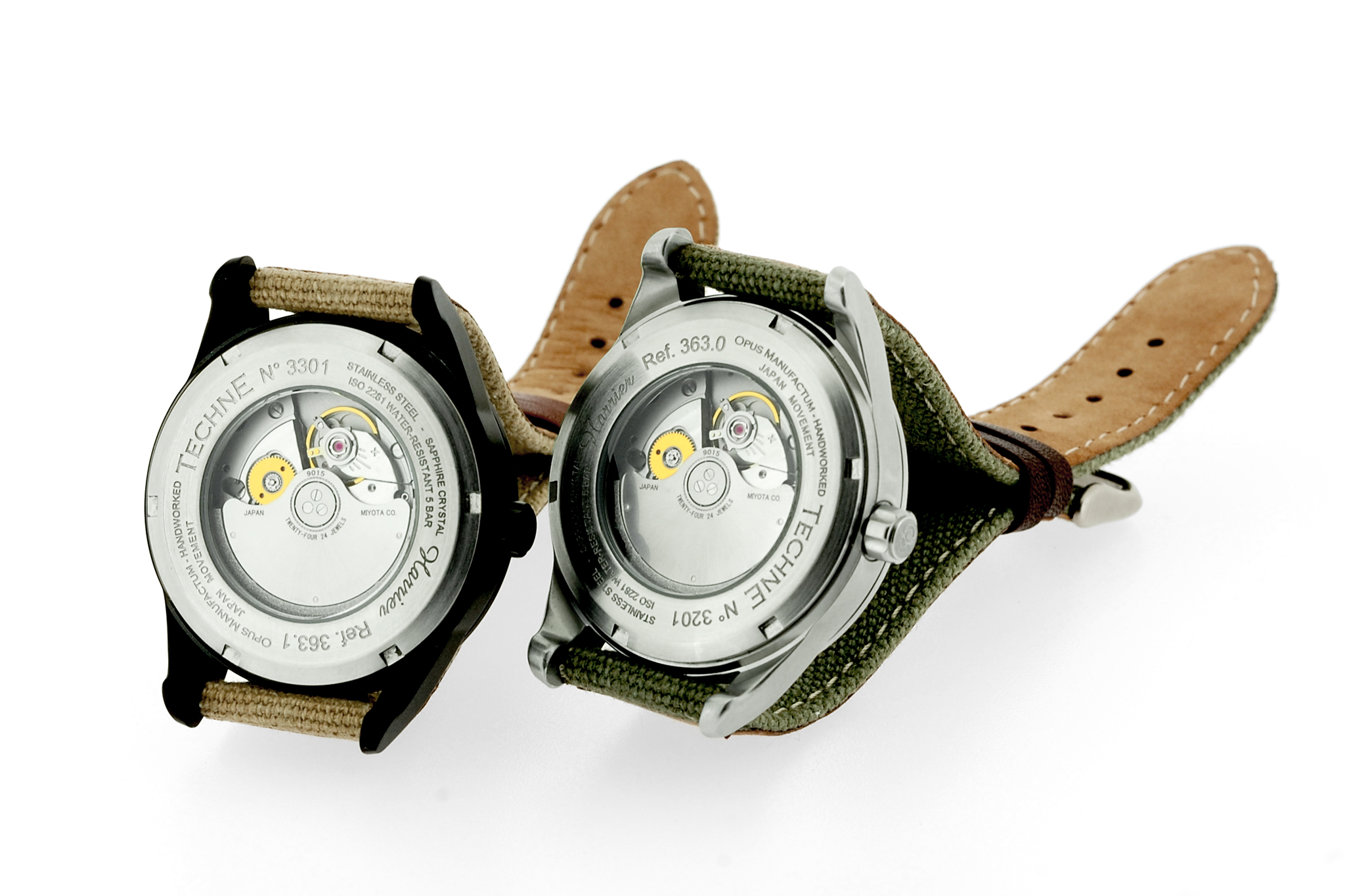
Miyota 9015 movements in Techné Harrier Ref. 363 watches.

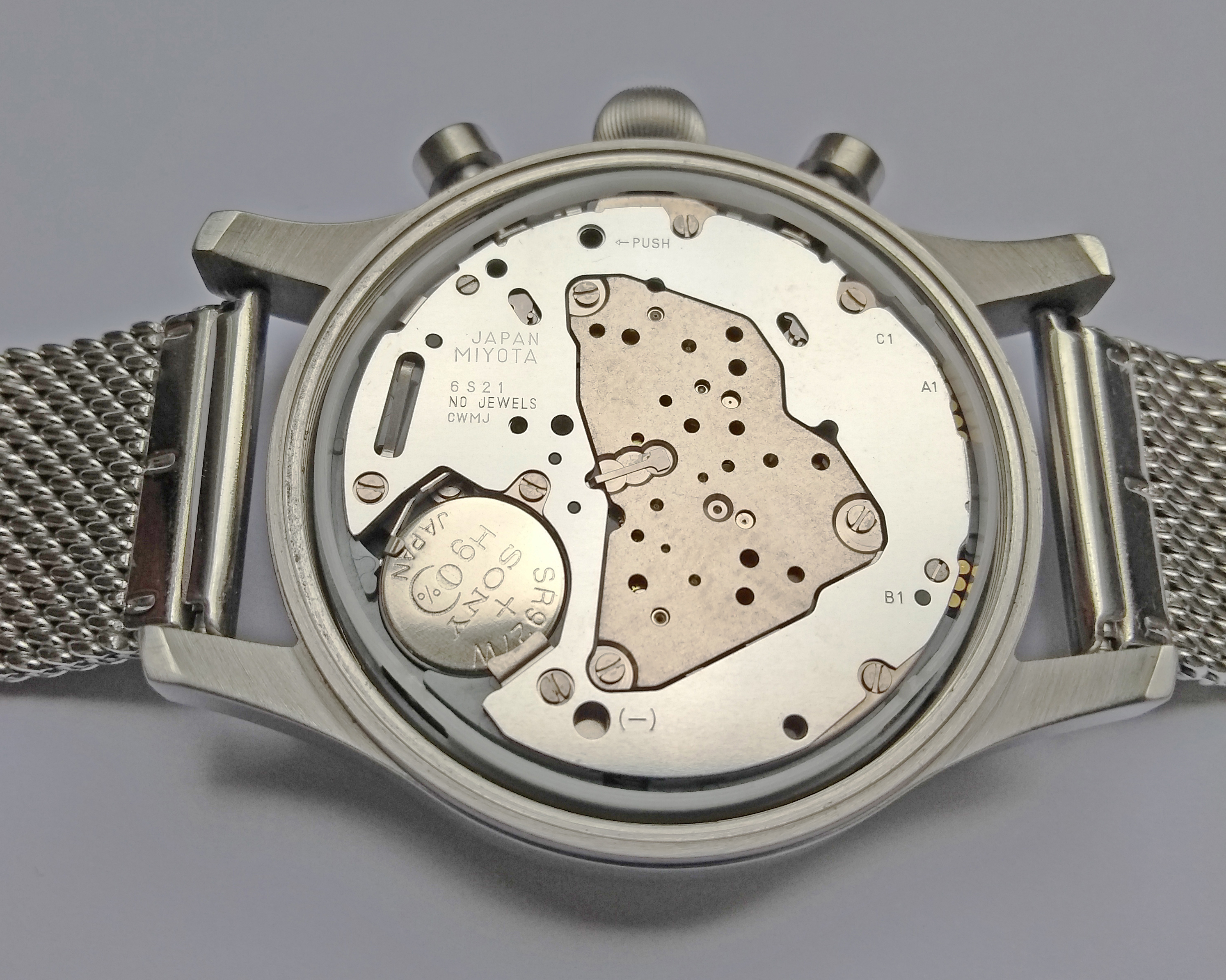
Miyota 6S21 quartz chronograph movement in an Escapement Time Pilot Quartz Watch.
