= Oris =

Swiss manufacturer of mechanical watches

Oris SA
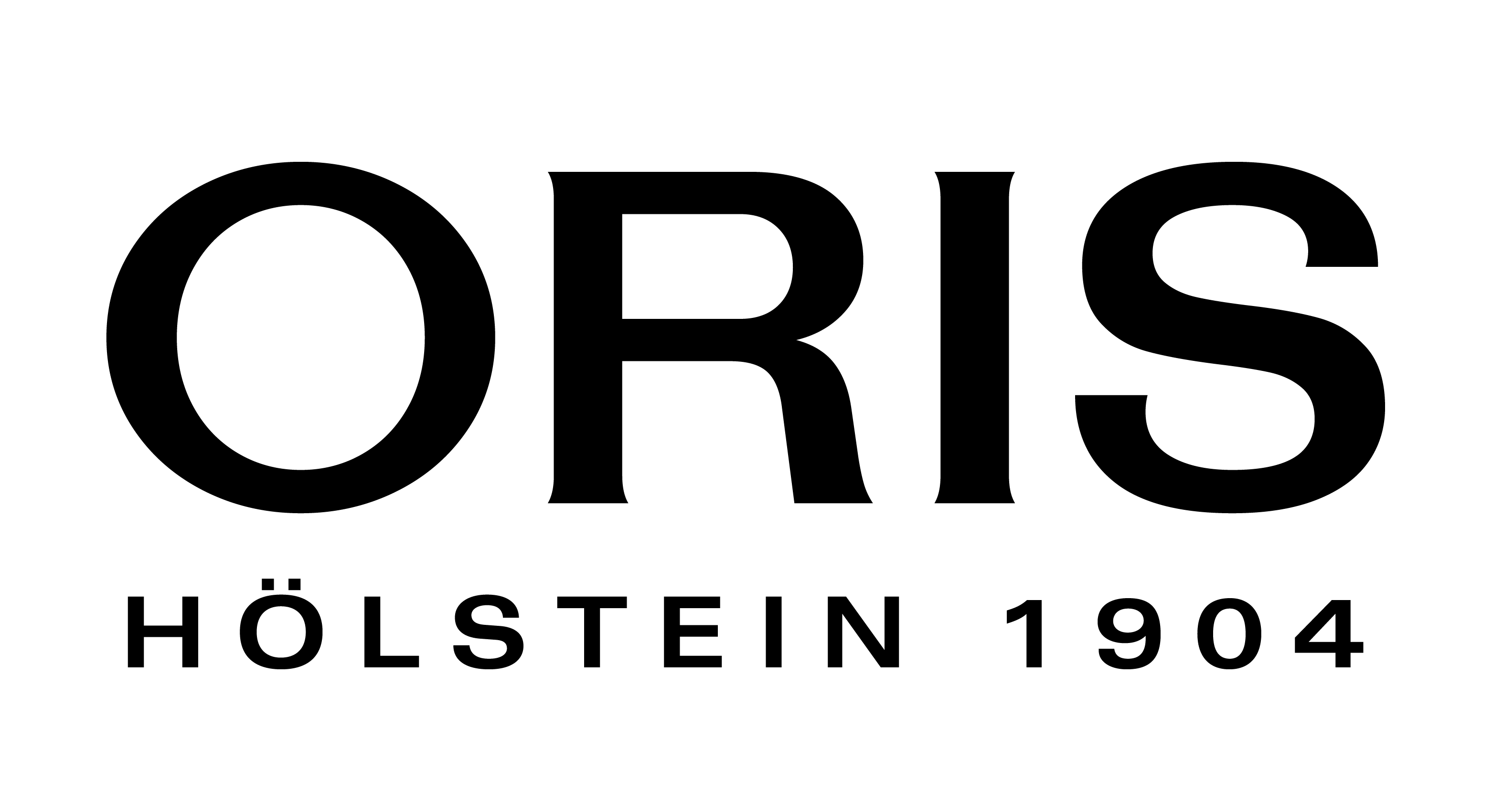
- Type: Private company
- Industry: Watchmaking
- Founded: 1904; 122 years ago
- Headquarters: Hölstein, Switzerland
- Area served: Worldwide
- Key people: Ulrich W. Herzog (Chairman); Claudine Gertiser-Herzog (Co-CEO); Rolf Studer (Co-CEO)
- Number of employees: 140 (2017)
- Divisions: Saros AG; Siro
- Website: oris.ch

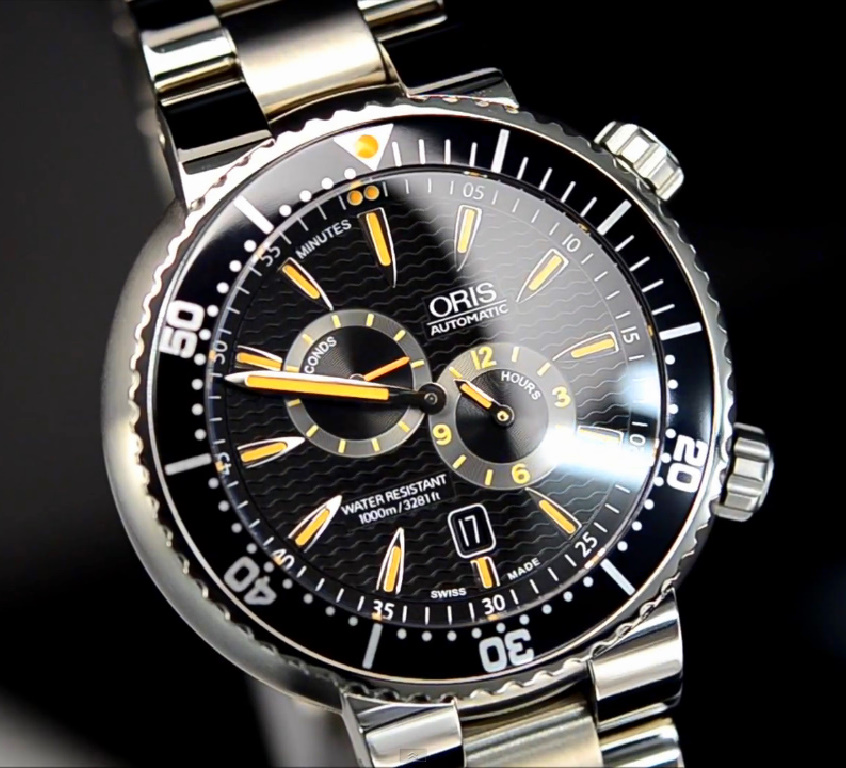
Oris regulator dive watch with small seconds

Oris SA is a Swiss luxury manufacturer of mechanical watches. The company was founded in 1904 and is based in Hölstein in the canton of Basel-Landschaft.

== History ==
=== Genesis and early growth ===
Oris was founded by Paul Cattin and Georges Christian in the Swiss town of Hölstein. They bought the recently closed Lohner & Co watch factory, and on 1 June 1904 the two men entered into a contract with the local mayor. They named their new watch company Oris after a nearby brook, and they began the industrial manufacture of pocket watches. In its founding year, Oris employed 67 people.

In 1906, the firm opened an assembly plant and second factory in the nearby town of Holderbank. Another factory followed in Como in 1908. By 1911, Oris had become the largest employer in Hölstein, with over 300 workers. By 1914, Oris had produced over a million watches. To entice more watchmakers, it built houses and apartments for its staff, and it expanded so that by 1929 it had additional factories in Courgenay (1916), Herbetswil (1925) and Ziefen (1925). Once all plants were operating at capacity, Oris boasted it could create “one watch every three seconds.”

=== The first Oris wristwatches ===
With the opening of the Ziefen factory and the electroplating plant in Herbetswil, Oris expanded its product range. The company began to fit bracelet buckles to its pocket watches, thereby transforming them into fully-fledged wristwatches. Oris began its focus on the fledgling aviation industry. By 1911, a pocket watch was developed for pilots, and in 1917, Oris created its first pilot’s watch to be worn on the wrist.

In 1927, company co-founder Georges Christian died and Jacques-David LeCoultre became President of the Board of Directors. Jacques-David LeCoultre was Antoine LeCoultre’s grandson and the man who merged with Edmond Jaeger to form Jaeger-LeCoultre in 1937. Following the death of Georges Christian a year earlier, Oscar Herzog, Christian's brother-in-law, took over as General Manager in 1928, a position he held for 43 years.

=== The Swiss Watch Statute ===
On 12 March 1934 the Swiss government introduced a law known as the Watch Statute, which was intended to protect and regulate the Swiss watch industry. The law authorized a “cartel”, made up of 2,241 designated member companies, 79% of which could have no more than 20 employees. At the time, Oris employed hundreds of people, making it too large to join the official cartel of Swiss manufacturers. The law prevented the large watch companies from introducing new technologies without permission. For Oris, the statute proved to be an obstacle because until that point, Oris had been using pin-lever escapement (Roskopf escapement) movements, which were claimed to be less accurate than the lever escapements used by some of Oris’s competitors.

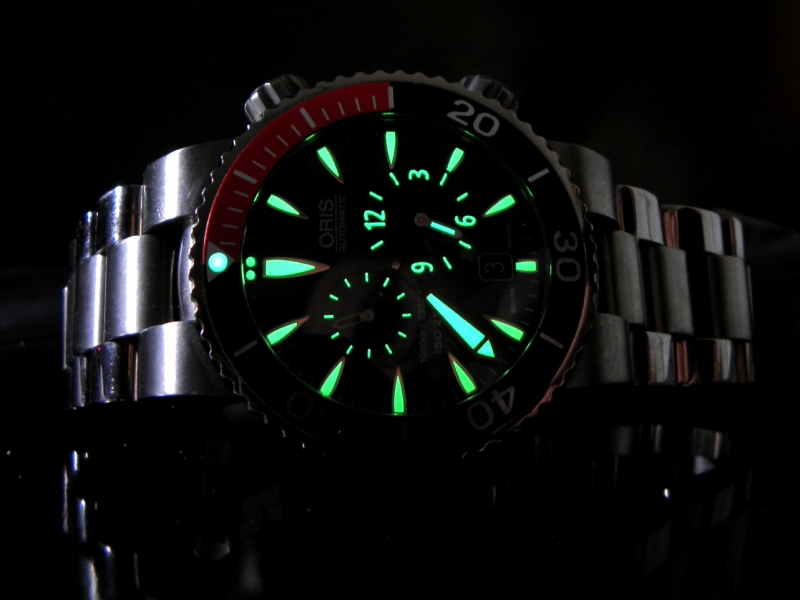
Oris Meistertaucher displaying illumination

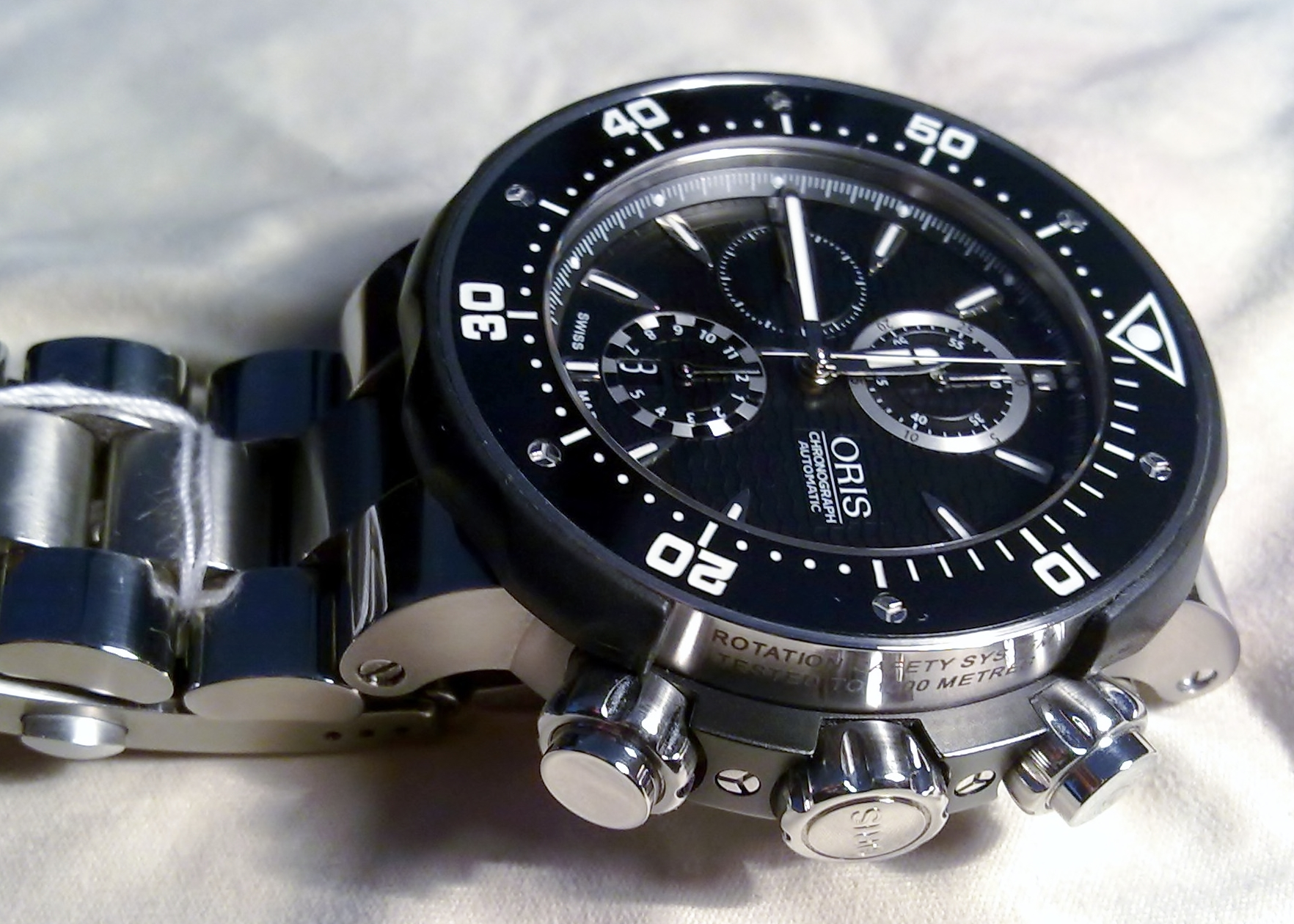
Oris ProDiver Chronograph

Despite continuing commercial success with pin-lever escapments, Oris took action against the Watch Statute, in order to enable the company to adopt the more accurate and durable lever escapement. In 1956 the company’s General Manager Oscar Herzog hired a young lawyer by the name of Dr Rolf Portmann who spent his first 10 years at the company campaigning to reverse the Watch Statute. Subsequently, the Watch Statute was gradually liberalised until it was abolished in 1971. Oris was then allowed to make Swiss lever escapement watches, its first being the automatic Calibre 645, followed shortly by the Calibre 652 movement, which was awarded full chronometer certification, the highest distinction for accuracy, by the Observatoire Astronomique et Chronométrique.

=== War Years and Beyond ===
In 1936, Oris opened its own dial factory in Biel/Bienne. By that time, the company produced almost every element of its watch and clock products in-house. Oris introduced its signature pilot’s watch in 1938, the so-called Big Crown. The collection takes its name from the watch’s oversized crown, employed as an aid to pilots who adjust their watches while wearing leather gloves. Variations on this watch are still produced today.

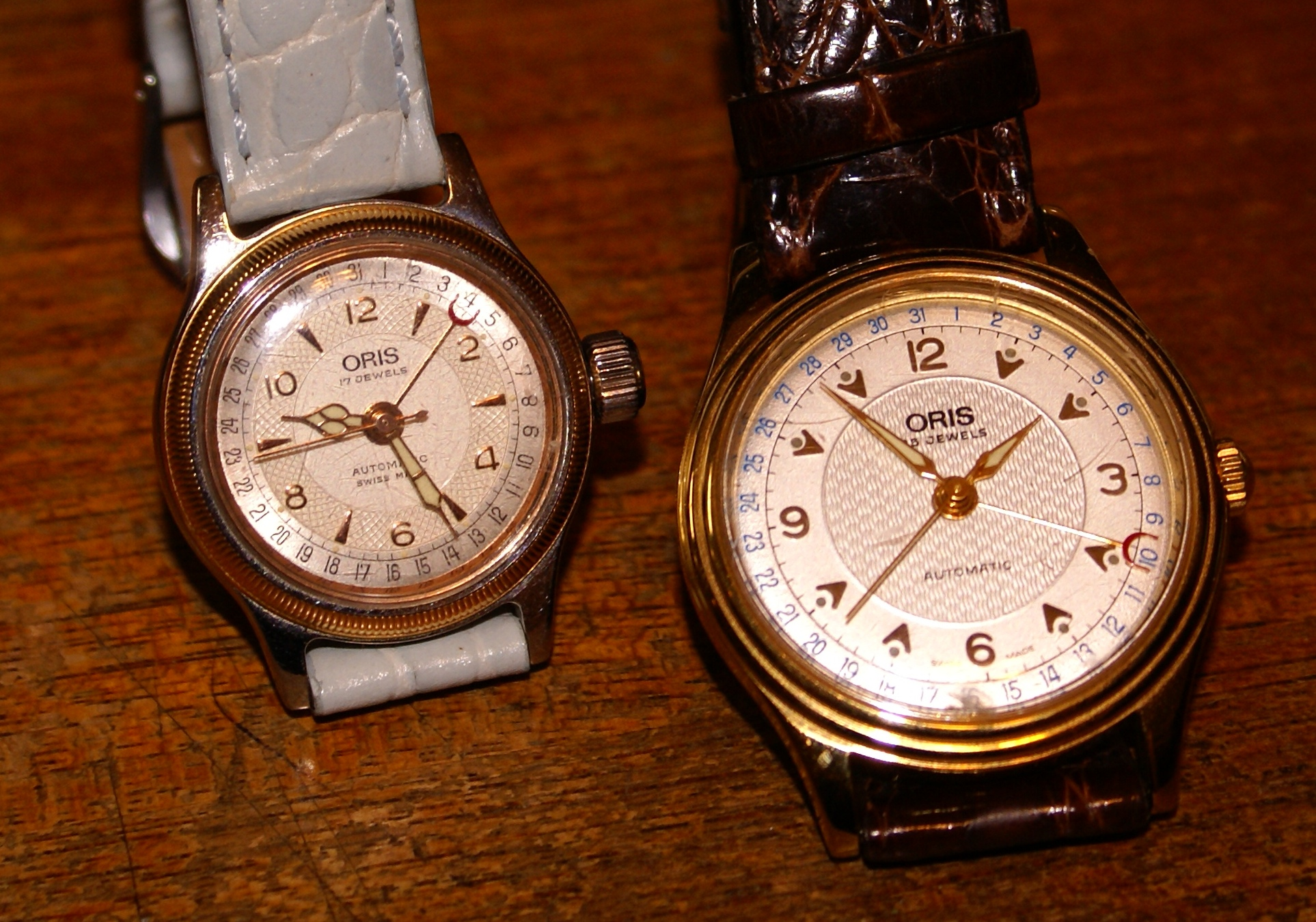
Vintage Oris watches with pointer date complications

During the Second World War, Oris’s distribution network beyond Switzerland was reduced significantly, due to decreased consumer demand as well as export and production limitations imposed by the government. To keep business alive, the company started manufacturing alarm clocks. Throughout the War, production of alarm clocks overshadowed wristwatches.

In 1948, Rolex's patent on the central-rotor automatic movement expired, making it possible for Oris to unveil an automatic movement of its own, including a power reserve display, which was quite rare at the time (1952). In 1956, the company used its expertise with clocks to inaugurate an alarm function on its Calibre 601 model wristwatch. The first Oris Diver was released in 1965, with large cardinal numbers highlighted by inverted lume wedges and using Oris' in-house movements calibre 654 and calibre 484. The original diver was recreated in 2015 with the Divers Sixty-Five, a vintage-inspired collection of dive watches.

=== The Quartz Crisis ===
By the end of the 1960s, 44 per cent of all watches sold worldwide originated in Switzerland. Oris employed 800 people across a network of factories in Hölstein and beyond, and produced 1.2 million watches and clocks a year, making it one of the 10 largest watch companies in the world. The company developed its own tools and machinery, and even ran an apprenticeship scheme, training 40 engineers and watchmakers every year.

On 25 December 1969, Seiko unveiled the Astron, the world's first quartz watch, which marked the beginning of the quartz revolution. The first Swiss quartz analog watch – the Ebauches SA Beta 21 – arrived at the 1970 Basel Fair. The Beta 21 was released by numerous manufacturers including the Omega Electroquartz. On 6 May 1970, Hamilton introduced the Pulsar – the world's first electronic digital watch. In the 1970s and early 1980s, quartz watches from Asia gained massive market share. The so-called ‘Quartz Crisis’ meant the end for around 900 watch companies in Switzerland and unemployment for two thirds of watch industry employees. Swiss manufacturers’ market share fell to 13 per cent worldwide.

In 1970, Oris gave up its independence and became part of Allgemeine Schweizer Uhrenindustrie AG (ASUAG), the predecessor of the Swatch Group. The management of the parent organization compelled Oris to manufacture quartz watches, in order to compete with the Japanese. However, this did not restore success. In the early 1980s, Oris employed only a few dozen people. In 1981, the production of its own movements was abandoned.

=== Independence ===
Like many other Swiss watch manufacturers in the early 1980s, Oris was on the verge of closure. Managing Director Dr Rolf Portmann – who was instrumental in the reversal of the Watch Statute – and Head of Marketing Ulrich W. Herzog took over the remainder of the company in 1982 as part of a management buyout. This turned Oris back into an independent company. Soon after, the newly formed and independent Oris SA elected to abandon quartz and produce mechanical timepieces in the mid-price segment. In 1988, Oris introduced an alarm wristwatch, with the calibre 418, incorporating its own alarm module using a real gong. By 1992 the company produced only mechanical watches.

It also produces a very small series of luxury promotional watches under the 'Saros' brand at the request of large companies for very special occasions. These watches made in Hölstein are only recognizable by the inscriptions on the back, the frame being fully dedicated to the subject of the promotion. The movements of these bespoke watches are mainly quartz, made in Switzerland.

The brand remains one of the very few Swiss watch manufacturers independent from large groups such as Swatch, Richemont or LVMH.

=== 21st Century ===
Since the turn of the millennium, the company has concentrated on watch market sectors of Diving, Culture, Aviation and Motor Sports.

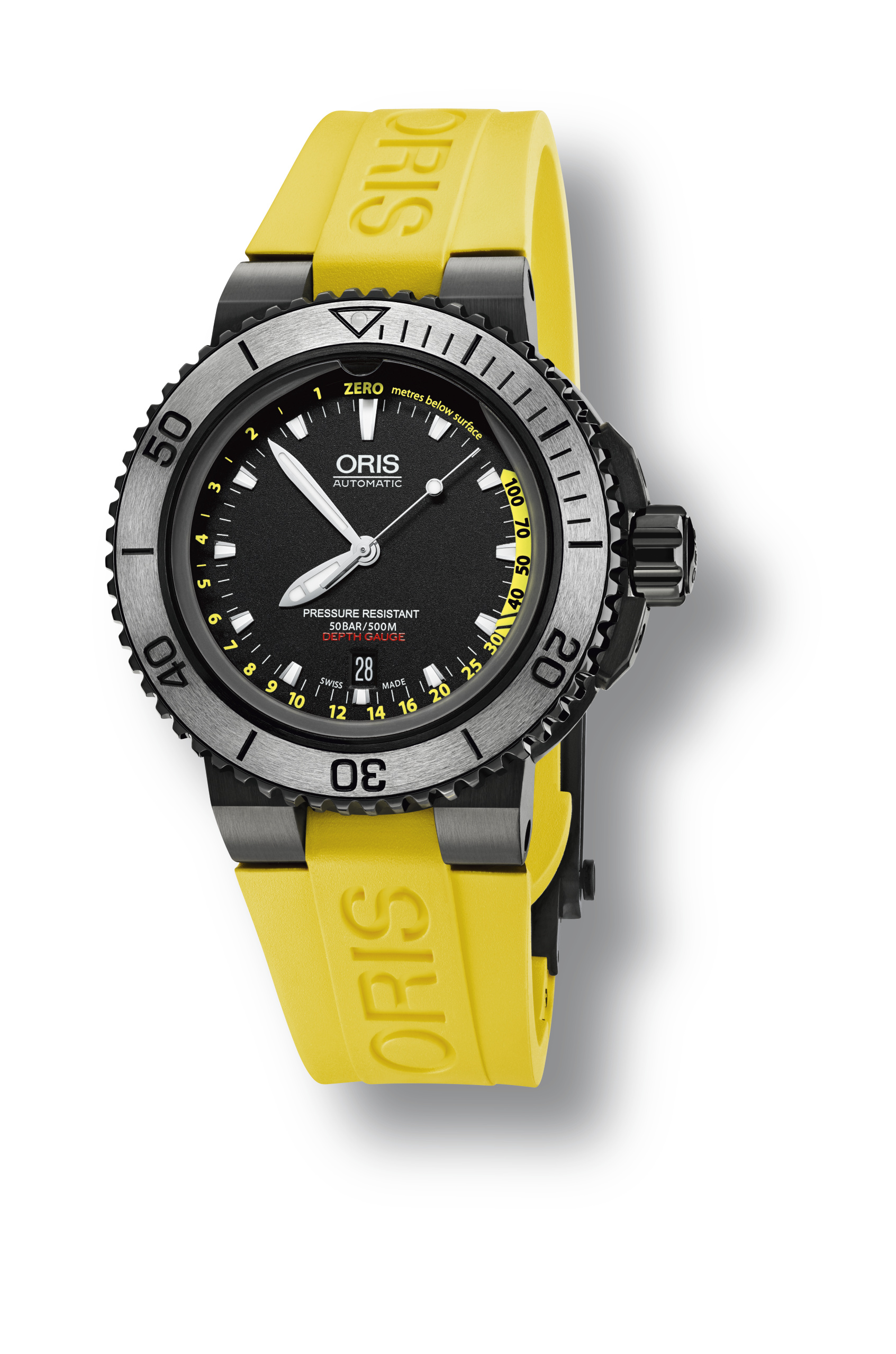
Oris Aquis Depth Gauge

- Diving: In 2004, the Quick Lock Crown system was developed, which only requires a single clockwise turn of 120 degrees to secure the crown in place. In 2009, Oris introduced the Rotation Safety System, a device that locks the uni-directional rotating bezel of a diving watch into place, preventing accidental adjustment underwater. Oris patented the Oris Aquis Depth Gauge, its first mechanical depth gauge, in 2013. It allows water into a channel via a small hole at 12 o’clock. Water enters the hole under pressure, creating a watermark that corresponds to a depth gauge. As of the early 2020's, the brand's flagship product remains the Aquis diver watch line, featuring the in-house Calibre 400 and the Quick Strap Change System, which allows the strap to be changed easily and without tools.
- Culture: The Artelier Worldtimer (2004) was part of the brand’s “Oris Centennial Set”, released to celebrate its 100th anniversary. A world timer displays time across all 24 major time zones, generally by way of a ring featuring names of cities that are representative of each zone. The Artelier Worldtimier, in contrast, uses a pivoting 2-way bezel that enables the wearer to jump the local hour hand forward or backward in single hour increments while also driving the date.
- Motor Sports: Although the "Motor Sport Collection" was inaugurated in 1970 with the Chronoris model, focus sharpened through a partnership with Formula One team Williams Racing in 2003, resulting in the 2015 release of the "Williams" featuring stainless steel or black Carbon Fiber and Titanium cases, a sporty, black rubber band, dark face, and blue team-colored accents. In 2018 Oris ceased its F1 sponsorship because the watch company's focus shifted to environmental conservation.

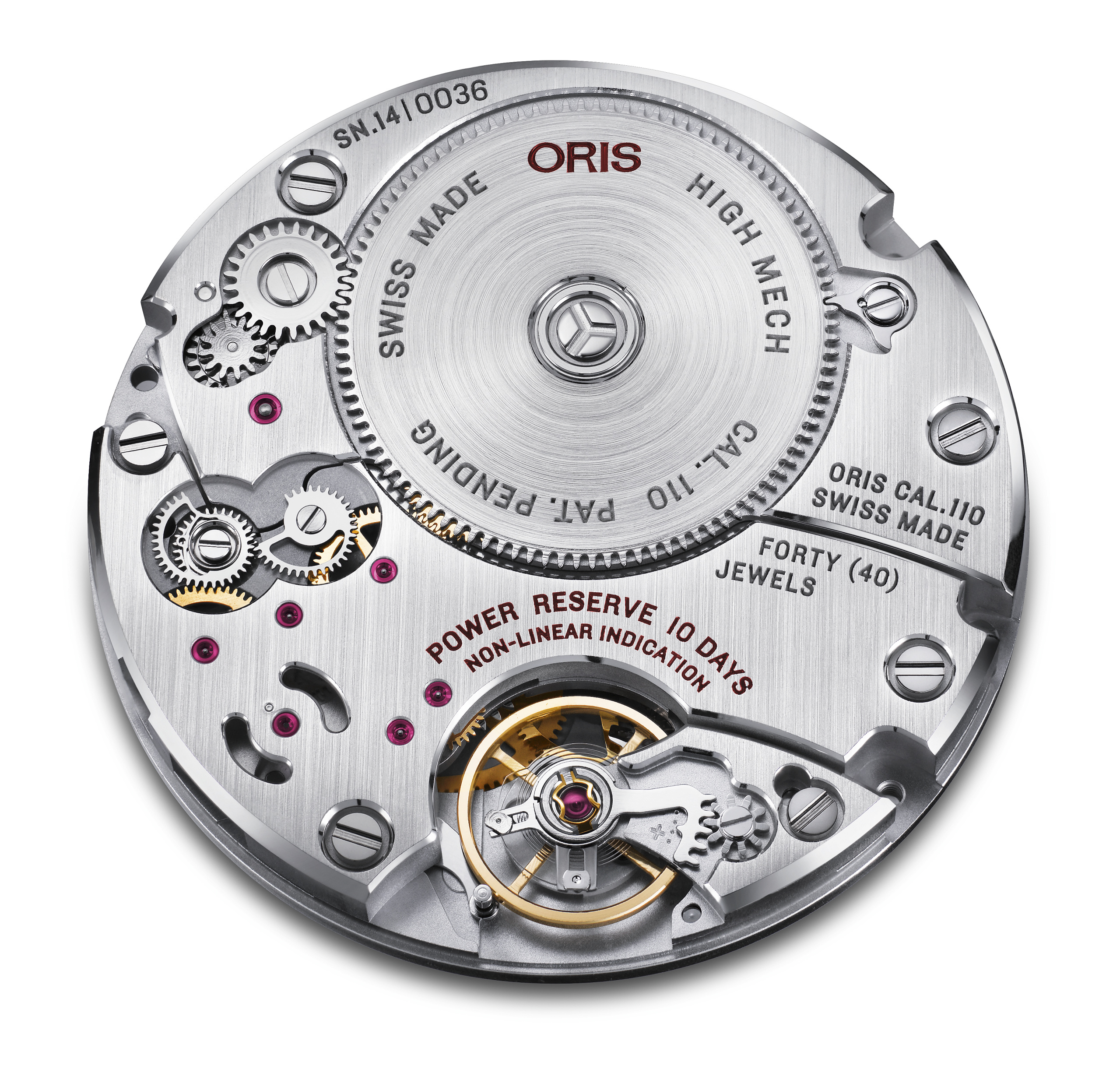
Oris Calibre 110 02

Since 2002, the Red Rotor has served as Oris's registered trademark and distinguishing feature and is visible on many Oris watches through transparent casebacks.

In 2005, Oris sponsored a civic event in Hölstein which featured a smiling bear. This "Oris Bear" subsequently became the company's mascot.

In 2014, Oris celebrated 110 years of watchmaking with its first in-house-developed calibre for 35 years. Calibre 110 was a hand-wound movement that featured a 10-day power reserve and a patented non-linear power reserve indicator. It featured an exceptionally large barrel spring with a 6-foot (1.8m) spring. It resulted from a collaboration between Oris and L’École Téchnique Le Locle that took over 10 years to realize. In 2020, Oris introduced the Calibre 400, an in-house movement which is anti-magnetic up to 2250 gauss, has a 5-day power reserve (120 hours), a recommended 10-year service interval and comes with a 10-year warranty. Since 2014, Oris developed its in-house Movement Creation Program, which has, over the succeeding decade, unveiled ten new mechanical calibers, the latest of which (as of 2023) is the hand-wound caliber 473 with five days of power reserve, increased anti-magnetism and a 10-year warranty.

In 2022, Oris was named the Official Timekeeper for Lord’s Cricket Ground, the first in the history of the 230-year-old cricket club.

== Notable models ==
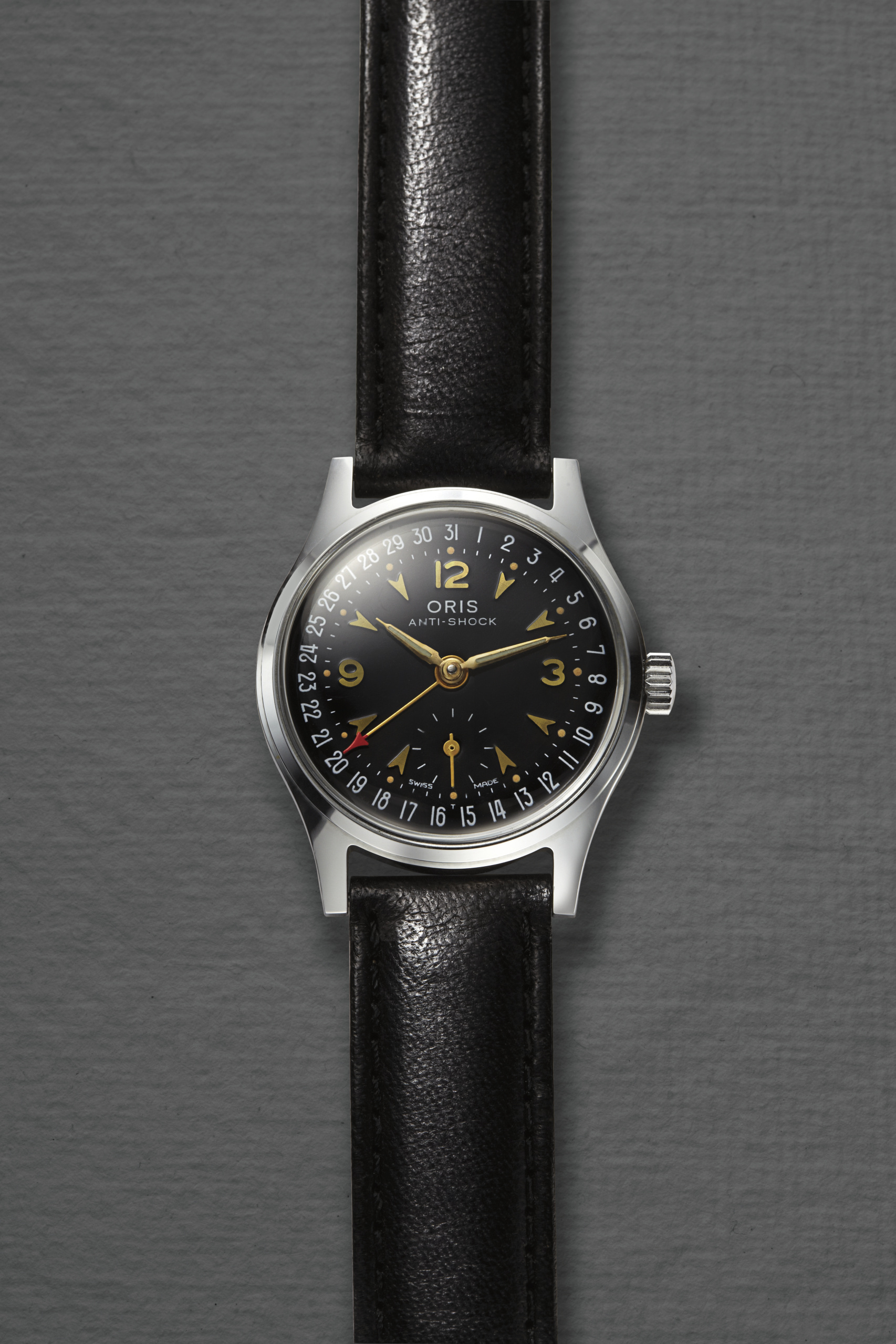
Oris Pointer Date 1938

- Big Crown Pointer Date (1938) -- had an oversized crown that could be easily operated by a pilot wearing gloves, along with large Arabic numerals so the time could be read quickly in the cockpit. It had a fluted bezel and a central hand with a pointer tip that indicated the date. In 2022, a new edition featured a 40mm case made from bronze, and employed Oris’s Calibre 754 automatic movement.
- 8-Day-Clock (1949)
- Chronoris (1970) -- 60 second timer with an internal bezel that is set by the crown at 3, while the crown at 4 winds the watch and sets the time. The pusher at 2 starts, stops and resets the stopwatch. The model was reissued in 2005 and again in 2017 as the Chronoris Date, with the Oris automatic caliber 733, based on the Sellita SW 200-1.
- Oris Worldtimer (1997) -- incorporated a multi time zone complication, using pushers at both 4 and 8:00 to respectively advance or decrease the main hour hand (local time) by an hour with each click. In 2017, a new edition was released whereby the hour hand could be adjusted by turning the bezel rather than via the former model's two pusher system.
- Aquis (2011) -- featured a 300-meter water-resistant case, with a screw-down crown; a ratcheting unidirectional dive-scale bezel; a domed sapphire crystal over the dial; a set of distinctive lugs that screw securely into the strap or bracelet; a date window at 6 o’clock; powered by the Oris Caliber 733. In 2017, Oris started updating the Aquis collection, with the result that by 2023 there were 42 different configurations in sizes of 39.mm, 41.5mm, and 43.5mm.
- Rectangular (2021) -- Oris’ first rectangular-shaped watch appeared in 1996 as a tribute to Miles Davis and a limited-edition model was designed in honour of Bob Dylan in 2008. Neither had significant commercial appeal. In 2021, Oris revived the series with four-sided stainless steel cases measuring 25.5mm in diameter and 30mm in length, smaller than previous Rectangular Oris watches.
- Coulson Limited Edition (2022) --inspired by Coulson Aviation’s efforts to combat wildfires, and developed in conjunction with the Swiss Federal Institute of Technology, Oris utilizes a unique 3D printing process that prints both carbon fiber and PEKK aerospace-derived polymer simultaneously to create an extremely light and rigid carbon fiber composite case.
- ProPilot Altimeter (2023) -- the first writstwatch to utilize an integrated mechanical altimeter, whereby unscrewing the crown allows air to enter the case, so that once the internal scale is adjusted to a referenced air pressure, the watch will accurately display the wearer's current altitude.
- ProPilot x Kermit; ProPilot x Miss Piggy Editions (2023) -- featuring either miniature depictions of the Muppets characters on date wheel on the first of every month, the watches also sported green and pink faces respectively.

== See also ==
- Quartz Crisis
