= Cortébert (watch manufacturer) =

Swiss watch brand

Cortébert Watch Company
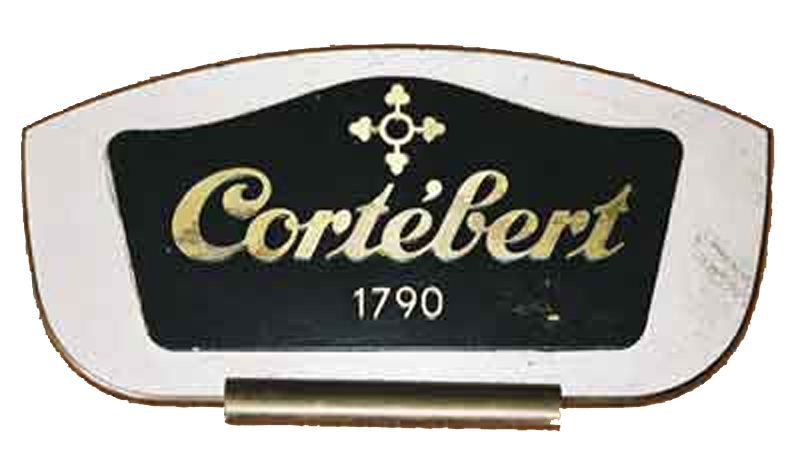
- Company type: Watch maker
- Industry: Watch making
- Founded: 1790
- Headquarters: Cortébert, canton of Bern, Switzerland
- Area served: Worldwide
- Products: Watches

Cortébert was a Swiss premium watch brand, manufacturing their own movements, supplying movements to other brands such as Rolex and introducing a jump-hour movement later adopted by IWC. When the quartz crisis hit the industry in the 1970s, the majority of prestige brands ceased production, including Cortébert.

== History ==
Abraham-Louis Juillard opened his small watchmaking store in Cortébert village in Switzerland in 1790. This date is commonly used as the date of founding although the Cortébert brand name was not registered until 1855 using the bottony cross as a logo.

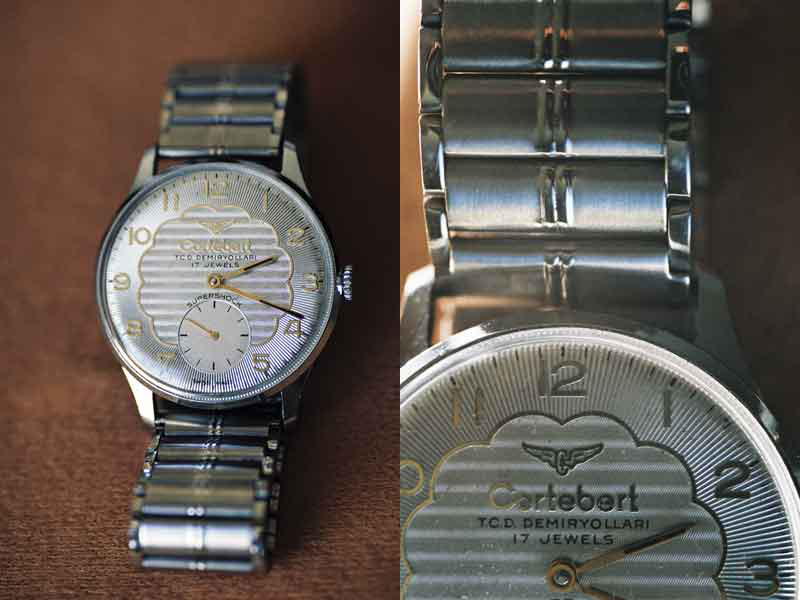
Cortébert Turkish Railroad watch

Cortébert became well known for their railroad watches: they supplied both the Turkish railroad system and the Italian railroad system, as well as a number of street car systems throughout Europe.

In the 1927, at the request of Mussolini, Cortébert started distributing their watches in Italy under the Perseo brand name, as fascist Italy rejected foreign brand names. It is under this name that they were used by the Italian railway system.

The Russian watch factory Molnija produced a number of calibers that were very similar to Cortébert's 16 Ligne Cal. 620.

By 1944 Cortébert had a lineup consisting of 20 different calibers.

Perseo continued to be used by the Italian railway system after World War II and became well regarded by the Italian public. Perseo continues their relationship with the Italian Railroad System.

In the early 1970s, Cortébert suffered deeply from the quartz revolution sweeping the world watch industry. The representatives of Cortébert in Italy bought the Perseo brand name from Cortébert and continue today as an independent company.

Cortébert closed in the early 1970s and production ceased.

== Jump-hour watches ==
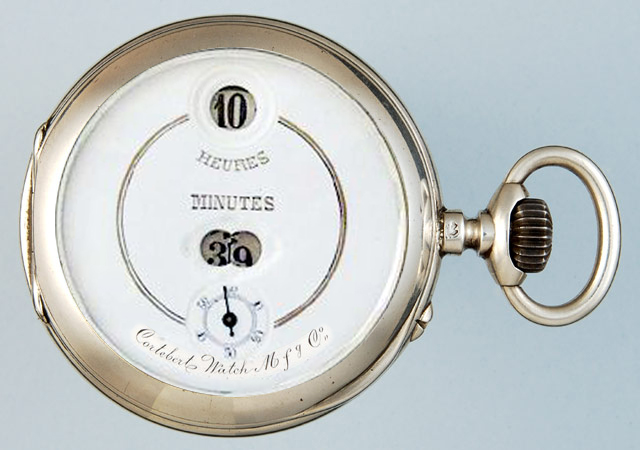
Cortébert jump-hour

In the late 19th century, Cortébert obtained license for the jump-hour movement designed by Josef Pallweber. The same movement was used in some IWC models.

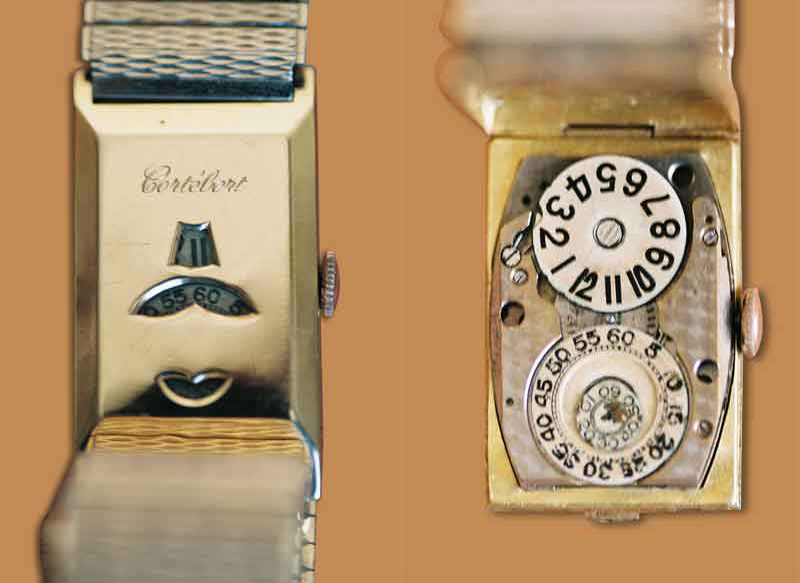
Cortébert jump-hour wristwatch

The early 1920s saw the development of the jump-hour into a wristwatch. Because it displayed the time with digits instead of rotating hands, it was the first digital wristwatch produced.
