= Omega Chrono-Quartz =

World's first digital/analogue chronograph

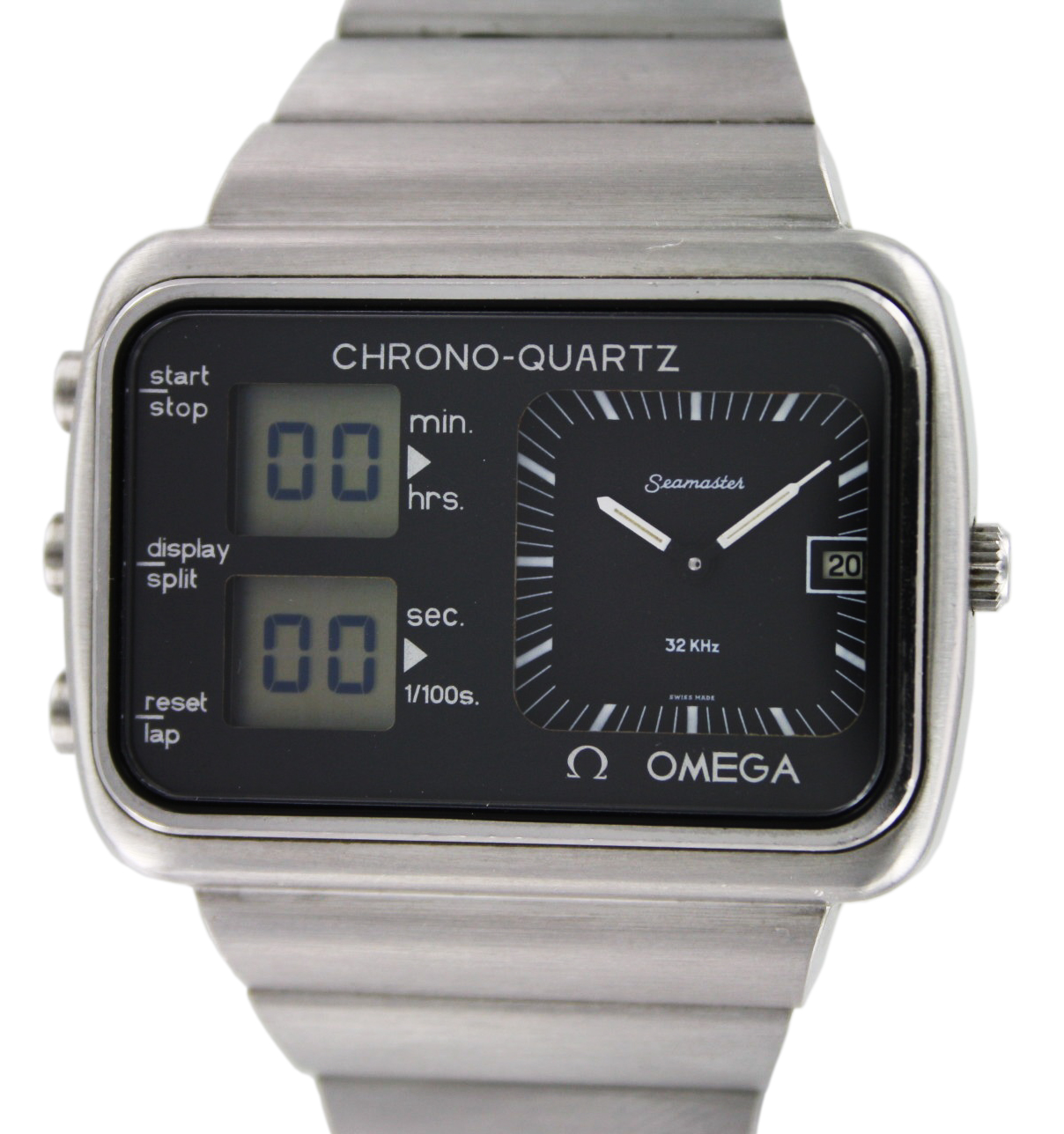
Omega calibre 1611 Chrono-Quartz

The Omega Chrono-Quartz was the world's first digital/analogue chronograph. It was invented by Omega SA. The watch launched at the 1976 Montreal Olympic Games and was Omega's flagship chronograph at that time. The watch is noteworthy as it was the first chronograph wristwatch in the world to combine analogue display for the time functions and a digital display for the chronograph function, each working independently of one another but running on the same quartz resonator. (32 kHz)

== Early development ==
The 1970s was a period of rapid development in quartz watch technology, between 1970 and 1980 the quartz era had taken hold of the entire watch making industry and the era saw rapid development in the quartz watch industry.

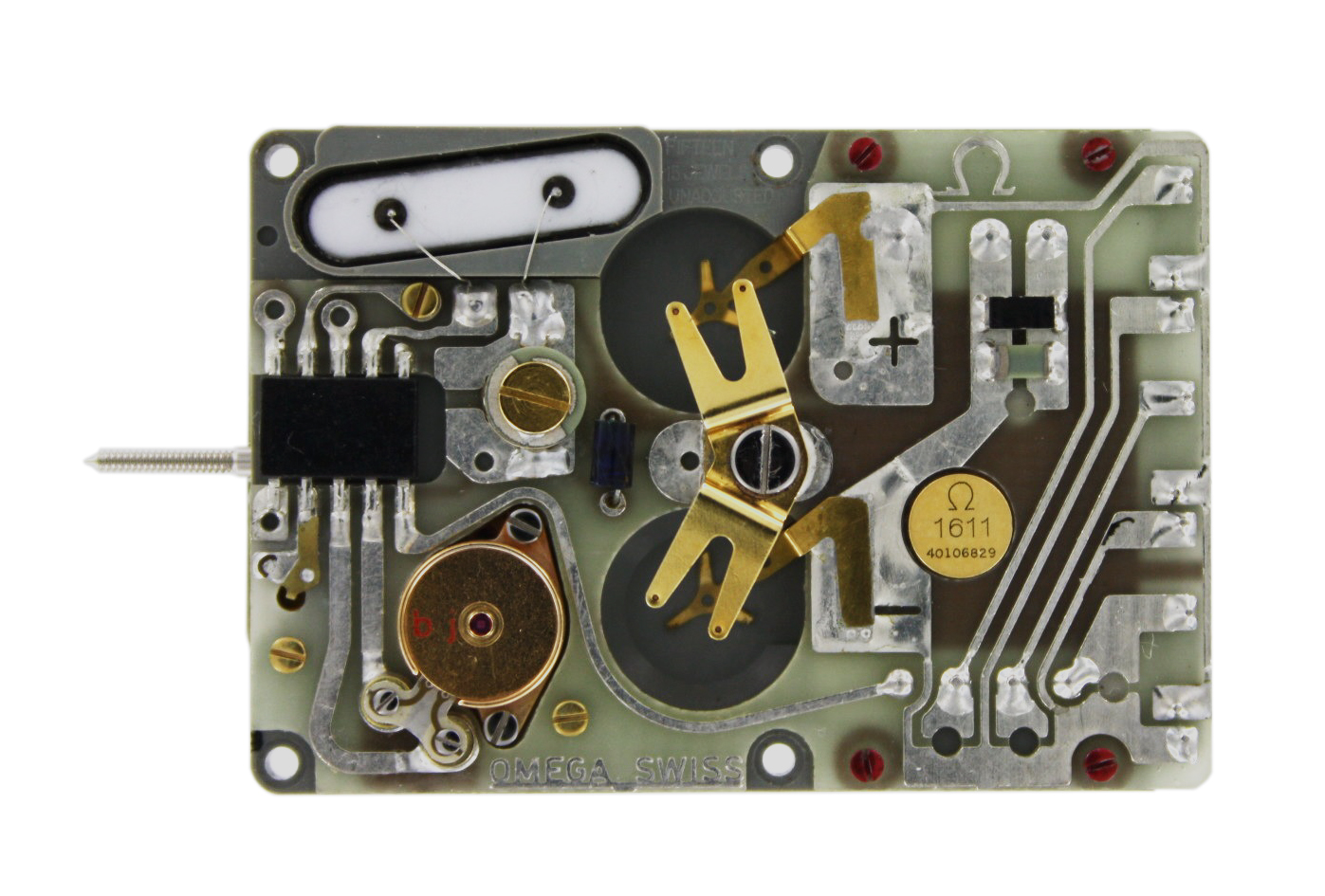
Omega calibre 1611 Chrono-Quartz movement

Omega were at the forefront of quartz wristwatch development in Switzerland, they had already introduced the Omega Electroquartz as the first Swiss production watch and the Omega Marine Chronometer as the first wristwatch to gain certification as a Marine Chronometer (and was accurate to 1 second per month).

As liquid crystal display technology began to be integrated into quartz wristwatches Omega saw an opportunity to again develop another world first by integrating an LCD into an analogue watch.

The calibre 1611 ‘Albatross’ (designated so because of the shape of the battery clamping system resembling an albatross's wings) was designed by Raymond Froidevaux. The movement had one large circuit on the rear of the watch which controlled both the analogue movement (based on calibre 1320) and digital LCD elements. The Chrono Quartz was originally run on two mercury 323 batteries having a running time of 26 months, this was replaced by the silver oxide 393 battery having a running time 15 months. The watch was not designed for intricate repair but more as a modular system, which would be replaced dependent on the components required. Working versions of the watch were available in 1975 but Omega did not release the watch until 1976.

== Production watch ==
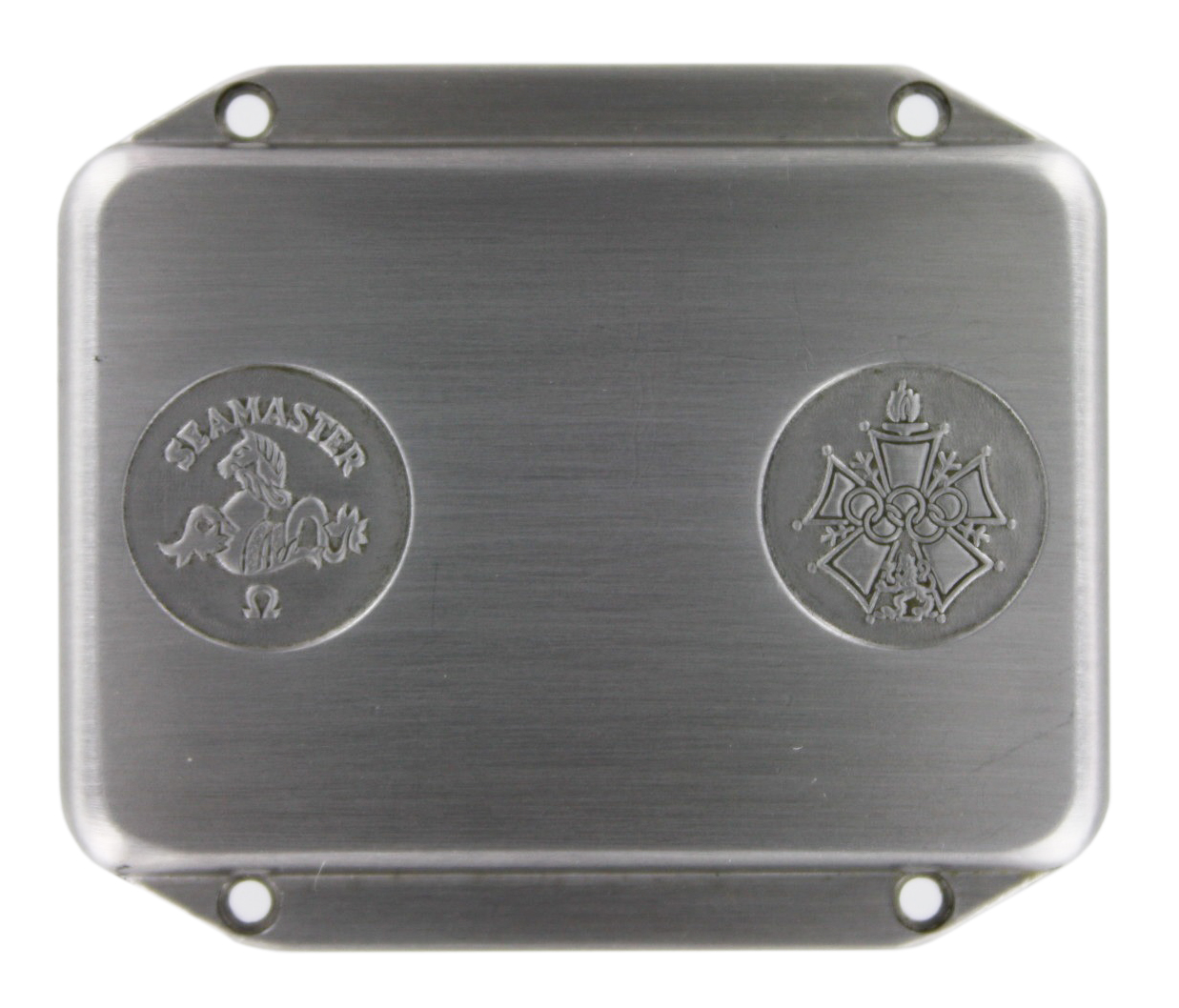
Omega calibre 1611 Chrono-Quartz case back with olympic logo

The Omega Chrono-Quartz is rare amongst modern wristwatches as the calibre 1611 had a module exclusive to itself; only 15,000 units were made.

The production version of the watch was introduced at the 1976 Montreal Olympic Games and at the same time Omega sponsored the event. The main Olympic scoreboard bore remarkable similarities to the Chrono-Quartz wrist watch.

The design of the watch was very distinctive - primarily it was large (51mm wide including the pushers), even in comparison to other watches of its time. The case of the watch was made from stainless steel and with an integral solid link stainless steel bracelet. The main reason for the big dimensions was the size of the movement, which had to accommodate the analogue module (on the right) and the digital chronograph module (on the left). The case back bore the Omega Seamaster hippocampus as well as the Olympic crest in recognition of the event at which it was introduced.

The chronograph module was controlled by three round pushers on the left side of the case and the analogue time and date were adjusted by a crown which could be pulled out to adjust the hour and date and a button within the crown which when pressed advanced the minutes.

When new in 1976, the watch cost £375; by contrast Omega's established Chronograph the Speedmaster professional 145.022 cost £175. This made the Chrono-Quartz a very expensive option in comparison to the other chronographs in Omega's range. This was one of Omega's range of one-year-only production chronographs, which included the famous Omega Speedmaster 125 and the Omega Bullhead of 1969.

== Summary ==
Although revolutionary in design and function the reign of the Chrono-Quartz as Omega's flagship chronograph was short lived. In 1977 Omega released the calibre 1620, which was a full digital LCD chronograph in numerous executions of Constellation and Speedmaster Professional. The full LCD of the omega Chronograph rendered the Chrono-Quartz obsolete, at the same time changes in design and fashion moved towards slimmer and smaller watches, by comparison the 1620 range of watches was at least 1/3rd smaller than the bulky Chrono-Quartz.

The Chrono-Quartz remained in Omega's line up for a further two years but by 1979, it had been completely phased out. Despite its relatively short production span and limited application the Chrono-Quartz represents one of Omega's most distinctive designs of the 1970s and was a world first in blending analogue and digital technology, which was also later used by Heuer amongst others and is still used by modern wristwatch manufacturers.
