= Quartz crisis =

1970s–80s watchmaking industry upheaval

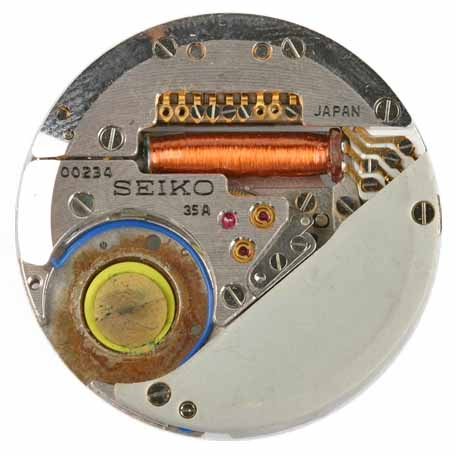
Quartz movement of the Seiko Astron, 1969

The quartz crisis (Switzerland) or quartz revolution (United States, Japan, and other countries) was the upheaval in the watchmaking industry caused by the advent of quartz watches in the 1970s and 1980s, that largely replaced mechanical watches around the world. It caused a significant decline of the Swiss watchmaking industry, which chose to remain focused on traditional mechanical watches, while the majority of the world's watch production shifted to Japanese companies such as Seiko, Citizen and Casio which embraced the new electronic technology.

The quartz crisis took place amid the postwar global Digital Revolution (or "Third Industrial Revolution"). The crisis started with the Astron, the world's first quartz watch, which was introduced by Seiko in December 1969. The key advances included replacing the mechanical or electromechanical movement with a quartz clock movement as well as replacing analog displays with digital displays such as LED displays and later liquid-crystal displays (LCDs). In general, quartz timepieces are much more accurate than mechanical timepieces, in addition to having a generally lower cost and therefore sales price.

== History ==
=== Before the crisis ===
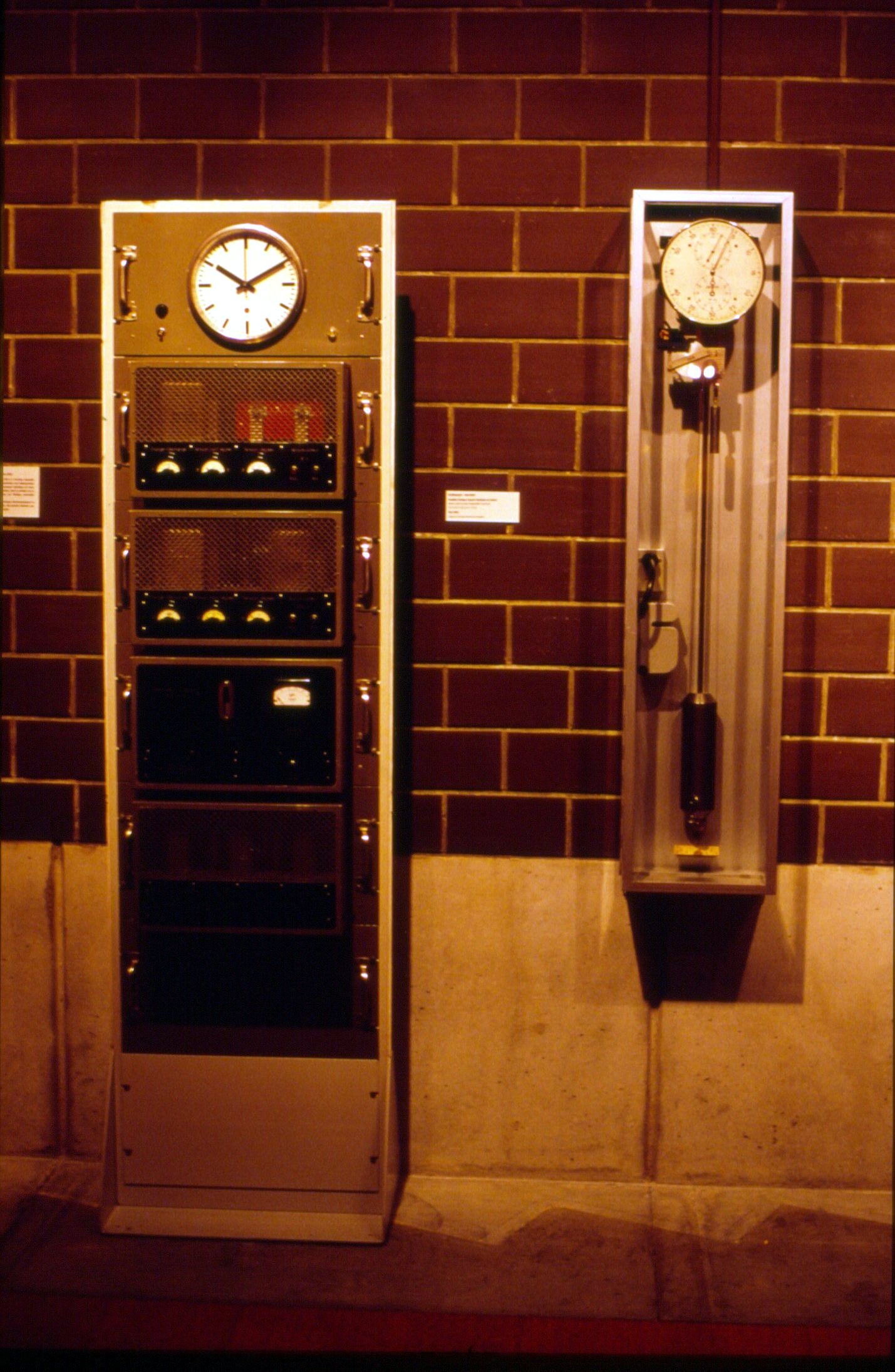
The first Swiss quartz clock, which was made after World War II (left), on display at the International Museum of Horology in La Chaux-de-Fonds in Switzerland

During World War II, Swiss neutrality permitted the watch industry to continue making consumer time-keeping apparatus, while the major nations of the world shifted timing apparatus production to timing devices for military ordnance. As a result, the Swiss watch industry enjoyed an effective monopoly. The industry prospered in the absence of any real competition. Thus, prior to the 1970s, the Swiss watch industry had 50% of the world watch market.

In the early 1950s a joint venture between the Elgin Watch Company in the United States and Lip of France to produce an electromechanical watch – one powered by a small battery rather than an unwinding spring – laid the groundwork for the quartz watch. Although the Lip-Elgin enterprise produced only prototypes, in 1957 the first battery-driven watch was in production, the American-made Hamilton 500.

In 1954, Swiss engineer Max Hetzel developed an electronic wristwatch that used an electrically charged tuning fork powered by a 1.35 volt battery. The tuning fork resonated at precisely 360 Hz and it powered the hands of the watch through an electromechanical gear train. This watch was called the Accutron and was marketed by Bulova, starting in 1960. Although Bulova did not have the first battery-powered wristwatch, the Accutron was a powerful catalyst, as by that time the Swiss watch-manufacturing industry was a mature industry with a centuries-old global market and deeply entrenched patterns of manufacturing, marketing, and sales.

=== Beginning of the revolution ===
In the late 1950s and early 1960s, both Seiko and a consortium of Switzerland's top watch firms, including Patek Philippe, Piaget, and Omega, fiercely competed to develop the first quartz wristwatch. In 1962, the Centre Electronique Horloger (CEH), consisting of around 20 Swiss watch manufacturers, was established in Neuchâtel to develop a Swiss-made quartz wristwatch, while simultaneously in Japan, Seiko was also working on an electric watch and developing quartz technology.

One of the first successes was a portable quartz clock called the Seiko Crystal Chronometer QC-951. This portable clock was used as a backup timer for marathon events in the 1964 Summer Olympics in Tokyo. In 1966, prototypes of the world's first quartz pocket watch were unveiled by Seiko and Longines in the Neuchâtel Observatory's 1966 competition. In 1967, both the CEH and Seiko presented prototypes of quartz wristwatches to the Neuchâtel Observatory competition.

On 25 December 1969, Seiko unveiled the Astron, the world's first quartz watch, which marked the beginning of the quartz revolution. The first Swiss quartz analog watch – the Ebauches SA Beta 21 – arrived at the 1970 Basel Fair. The Beta 21 was released by numerous manufacturers including the Omega Electroquartz. On 6 May 1970, Hamilton introduced the Pulsar – the world's first electronic digital watch. In 1971 Girard-Perregaux introduced the Caliber 350, with an advertised accuracy within about 0.164 seconds per day, which had a quartz oscillator with a frequency of 32,768 Hz, which was faster than previous quartz watch movements and has since become the oscillation frequency used by most quartz clocks. Seiko made key patents publicly available to facilitate the widespread adoption of quartz technology, establishing it as the industry standard.

=== The rise of quartz ===
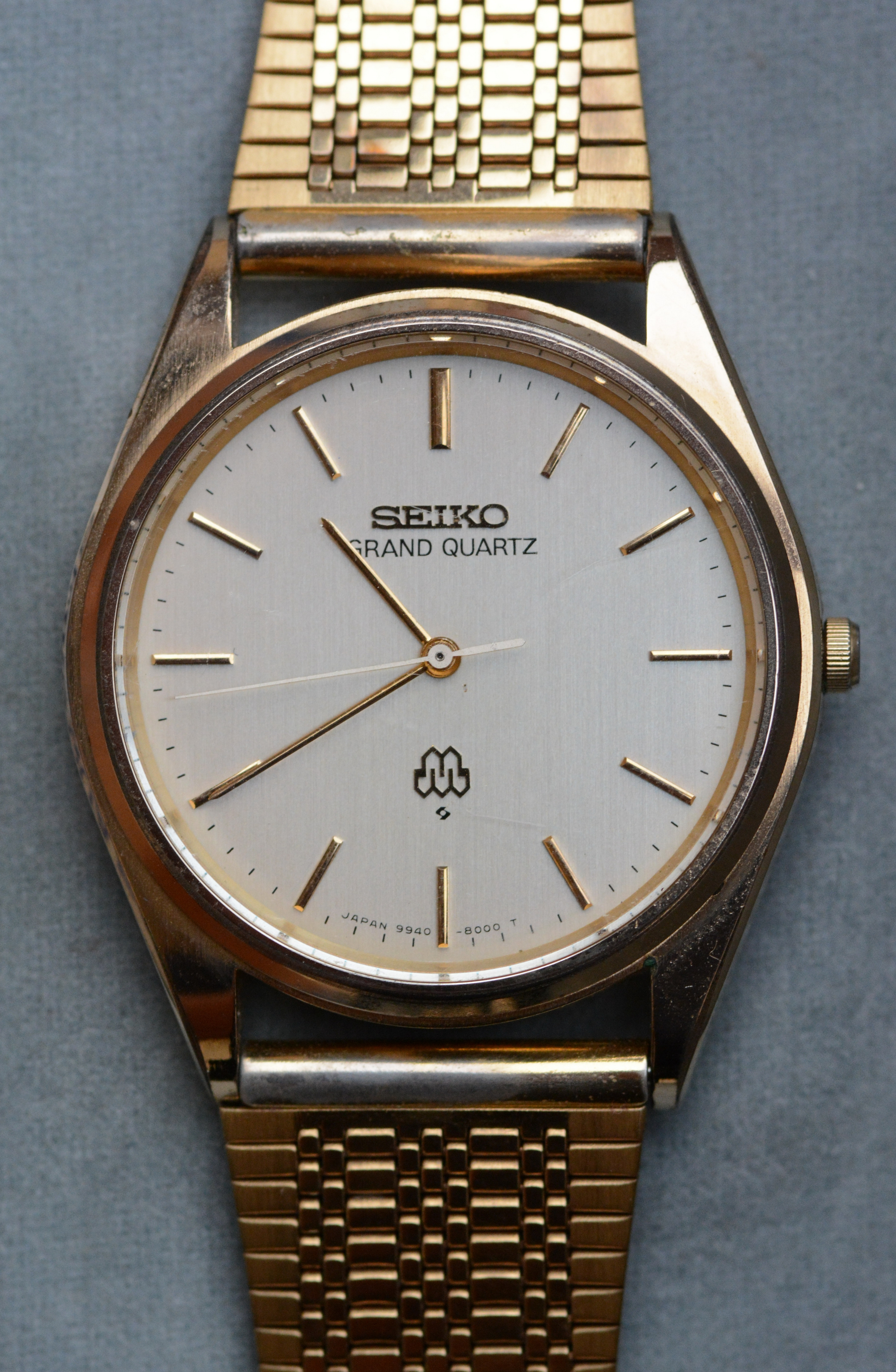
Seiko Grand Quartz, produced in 1978

In 1974 Omega introduced the Omega Marine Chronometer, the first quartz watch ever to be certified as a marine chronometer, accurate to 12 seconds per year using a quartz circuit that produces 2,400,000 vibrations per second. In 1976 Omega introduced the Omega Chrono-Quartz, the world's first analogue-digital chronograph, which was succeeded within 12 months by the Calibre 1620, the company's first completely LCD chronograph wristwatch.

Despite these dramatic advancements, the Swiss hesitated to embrace quartz watches. At the time, Swiss mechanical watches dominated world markets. In addition, excellence in watchmaking was a large component of Swiss national identity. From their position of market strength, and with a national watch industry organized broadly and deeply to foster mechanical watches, many in Switzerland thought that moving into electronic watches was unnecessary. Others outside Switzerland, however, saw the advantage and further developed the technology. By 1978, quartz watches overtook mechanical watches in popularity, plunging the Swiss watch industry into crisis while at the same time strengthening both the Japanese and American watch industries. This period of time was marked by a lack of innovation in Switzerland at the same time that the watch-making industries of other nations were taking full advantage of emerging technologies, specifically quartz watch technology, hence the term "quartz crisis".

As a result of the economic turmoil that ensued, many once-profitable and famous Swiss watch houses became insolvent or disappeared. This period of time completely upset the Swiss watch industry both economically and psychologically. During the 1970s and early 1980s, technological upheavals, i.e. the appearance of the quartz technology, and an otherwise difficult economic situation resulted in a reduction in the size of the Swiss watch industry. Between 1970 and 1983, the number of Swiss watchmakers dropped from 1,600 to 600. Between 1970 and 1988, Swiss watch employment fell from 90,000 to 28,000.

Outside Switzerland, the crisis is often referred to as the "quartz revolution", particularly in the United States where many American companies had gone out of business or had been bought out by foreign interests by the 1960s. When the first quartz watches were introduced in 1969, the United States promptly took a technological lead in part due to microelectronics research for military and space programs. American companies like Texas Instruments, Fairchild Semiconductor, and National Semiconductor started the mass production of digital quartz watches and made them affordable. It did not remain so forever; by 1978 Hong Kong exported the largest number of electronic watches worldwide, and US semiconductor companies came to pull out of the watch market entirely. With the exception of Timex and Bulova, the remaining traditional American watch companies, including Hamilton, went out of business and sold their brand names to foreign competitors; Bulova would ultimately sell to the Japanese-owned Citizen in 2008.

== Aftermath ==
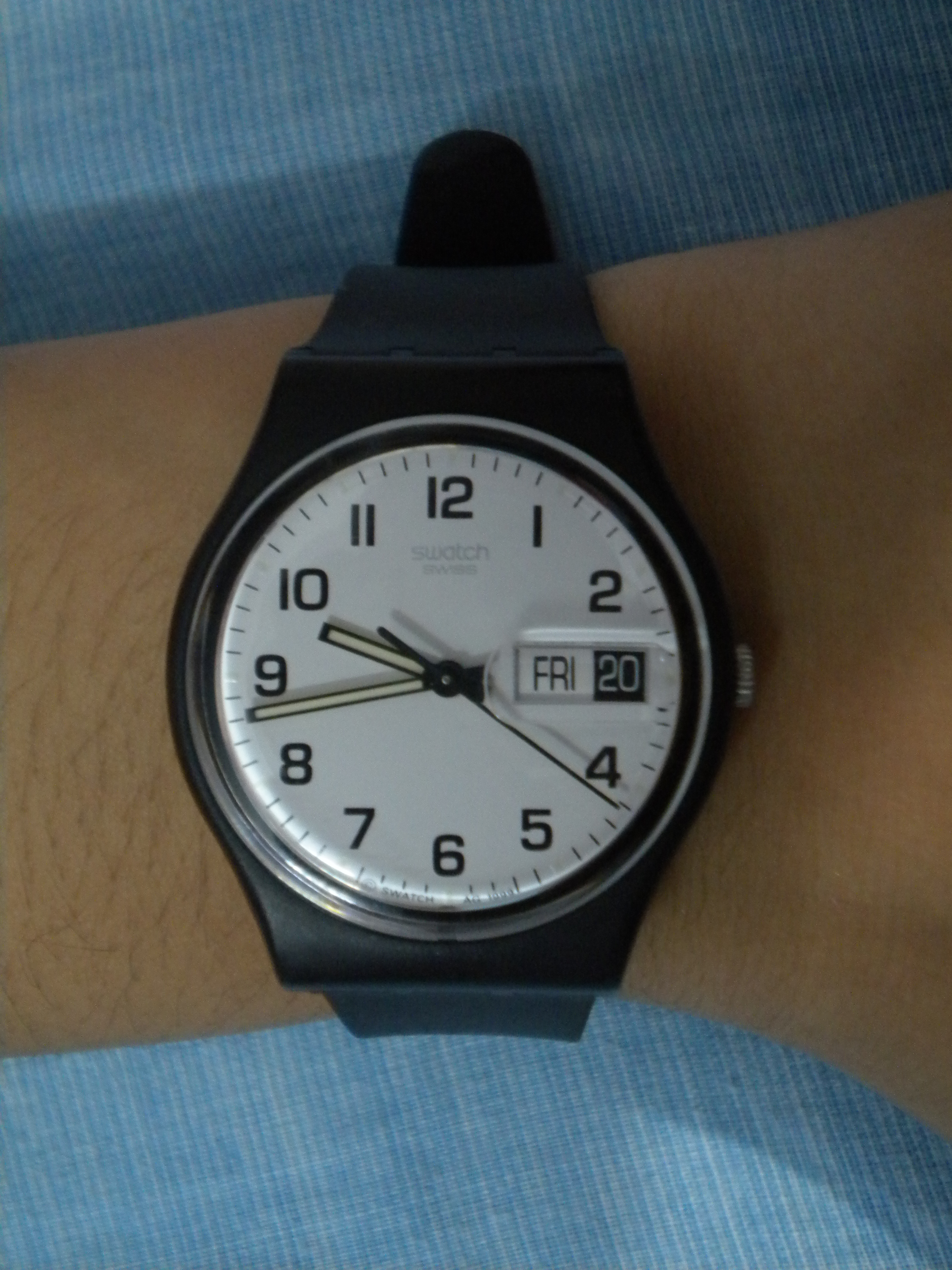
Swatch Once Again watch

=== The Swatch Group ===
By 1983, the crisis reached a critical point. The Swiss watch industry, which had 1,600 watchmakers in 1970, had declined to 600. In March 1983, the two biggest Swiss watch groups, ASUAG (Allgemeine Schweizerische Uhrenindustrie AG) and SSIH (Société suisse pour l'industrie horlogère), merged to form ASUAG/SSIH in order to save the industry. This organization was renamed SMH (Société de microélectronique et d'horlogerie) in 1986, and then The Swatch Group in 1998. It would be instrumental in reviving the Swiss watch industry; today, the Swatch Group is the largest watch manufacturer in the world.

The Swatch product was sealed in a plastic case, sold as a disposable commodity with little probability of repair, and had fewer moving parts (51) than mechanical watches (about 91). Furthermore, production was essentially automated, which resulted in higher profitability. The Swatch was a huge success; in less than two years, more than 2.5 million Swatches were sold. Besides its own product line Swatch, the Swatch Group also acquired other watch brands including Blancpain, Breguet, Glashütte Original, Harry Winston, Longines, Omega, Hamilton and Tissot.

=== Renaissance of mechanical watches ===
The quartz revolution drove many Swiss manufacturers to seek refuge in (or be winnowed out to) the higher end of the market, such as Patek Philippe, Vacheron Constantin, Audemars Piguet, and Rolex. Mechanical watches have gradually become luxury goods appreciated for their elaborate craftsmanship, aesthetic appeal, and glamorous design, sometimes associated with the social status of their owners, rather than simple timekeeping devices.

=== The rise of smartwatches ===
Since the 2010s, smartwatches have begun to significantly increase their shares in the global watch market, especially after the launch of the Apple Watch in 2015. There are concerns over the formation of a new type of crisis which may further threaten the Swiss watchmaking industry.

== See also ==
- List of watch manufacturers
