= Molnija =

Defunct Russian watch and clockmaker

Chelyabinsk Watch Factory "Molnija"

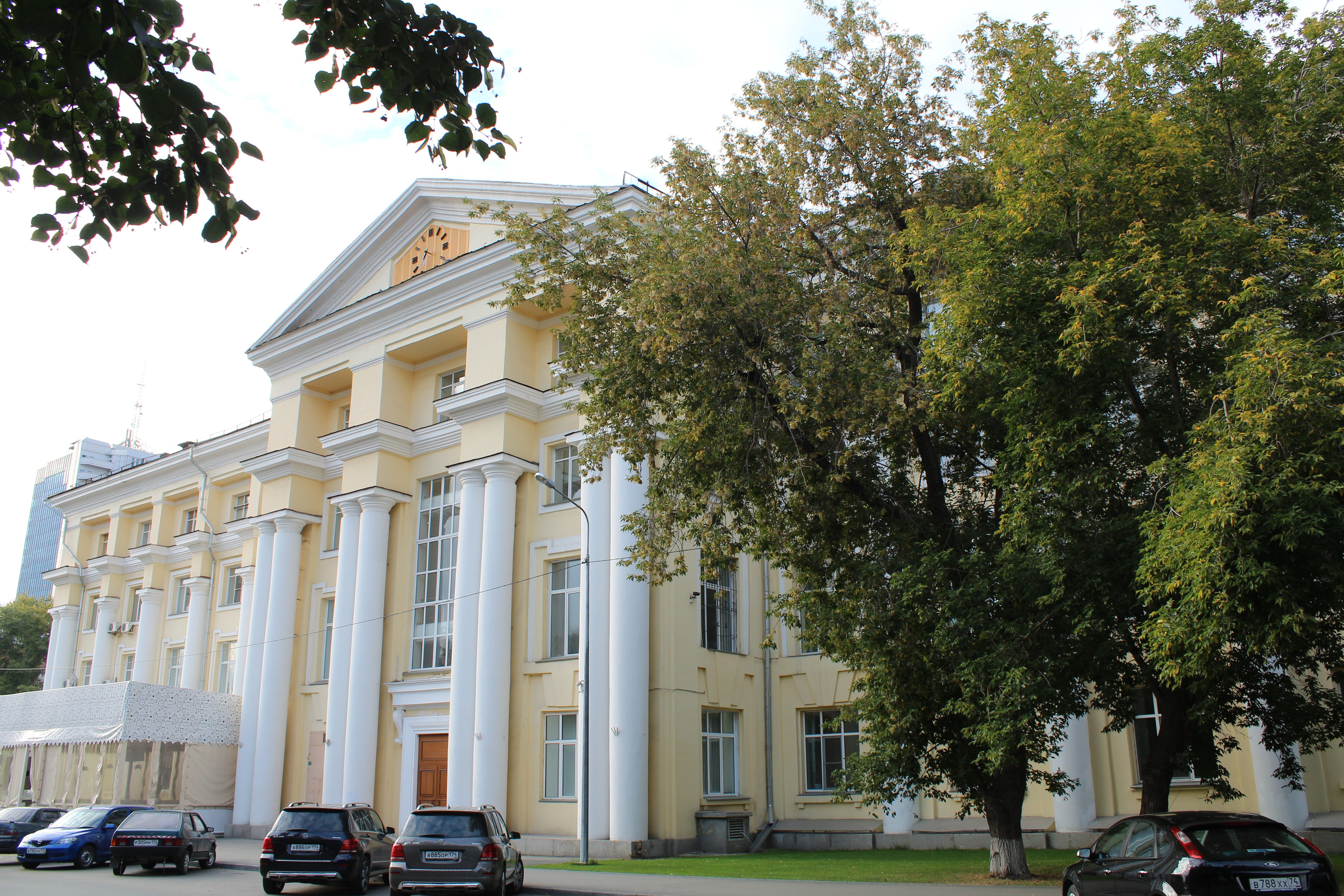
- The Molnija factory building
- Industry: Watchmaking
- Founded: 1947
- Headquarters: Chelyabinsk, Russia
- Revenue: $2.33 million (2017)
- Operating income: $189,672 (2017)
- Net income: $720 (2017)
- Total assets: $3.49 million (2017)
- Total equity: $2.09 million (2017)
- Website: Official website

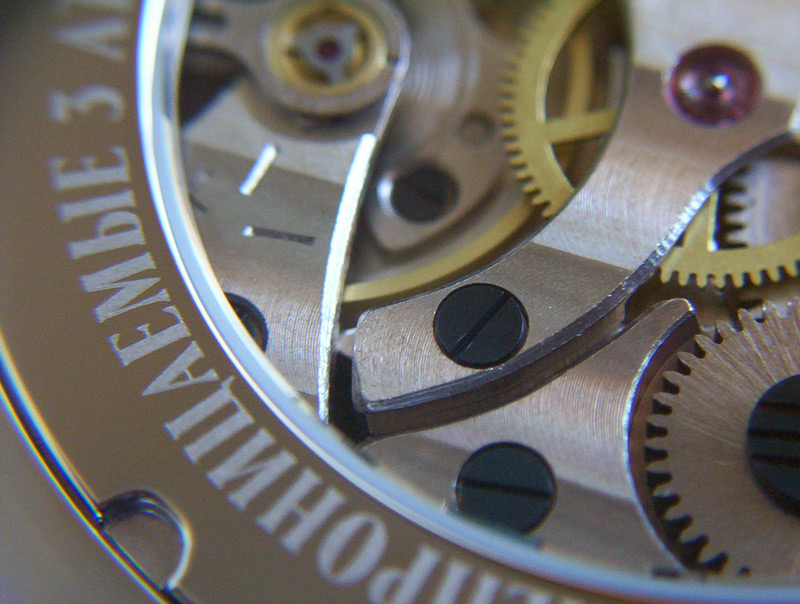
Russian Poljot "Siberia" model with finished Molnija movement, seen through a crystal back

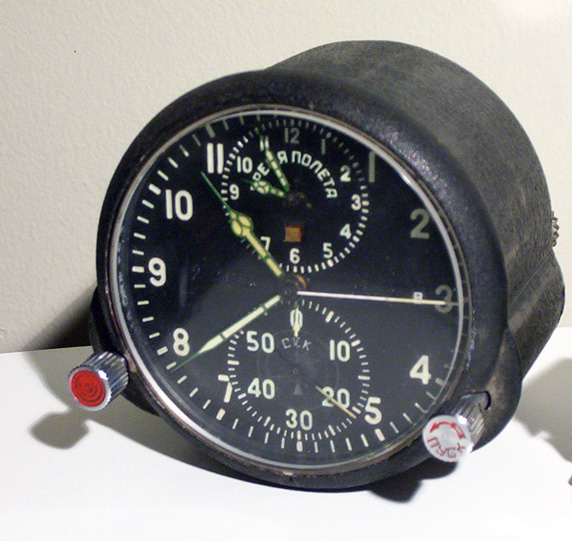
Molnija AChS-1 cockpit chronograph

Chelyabinsk Watch Factory "Molnija" (sometimes transliterated Molniya; Russian: Челябинский часовой завод) was a Russian watch and clockmaker based in Chelyabinsk, Chelyabinsk Oblast. Molnija (Молния) is the Russian word for lightning.

== History ==
The Molnija clock and watch factory opened on November 17, 1947. The company's main customer was then the Soviet Union Department of Defense, providing them with wristwatches, pocket watches and table clocks.

Molnija's main product were mechanical pocket watches with military, religious and historical motifs. The Molnija movement is basically a copy of a Cortébert movement used in Swiss watches from around 1940. About 80% of the work on most of the watches was done by hand. Some Molnija movements were used in oversized men's wristwatches. Early Molnija pocket watch movements (from 1947 to c. 1960) normally had 15 jewels. Later ones (from around 1965 to 1997) normally had 18 jewels. However from around 1997 they started to produce lower quality watches with fewer jewels.

The company ceased production in October 2007. A few employees continued to sell Molnija watches assembled from unused stock, and 'new' Molnija pocket watches were still available on the market for some time afterwards.

== Revival ==
After the closure of the factory in 2007, a small group of people revived the Molnija brand with new designs. As of 2021, the factory "Molnija" produces technical watches for aircraft and ships, and is actively developing new markets.

== Products ==
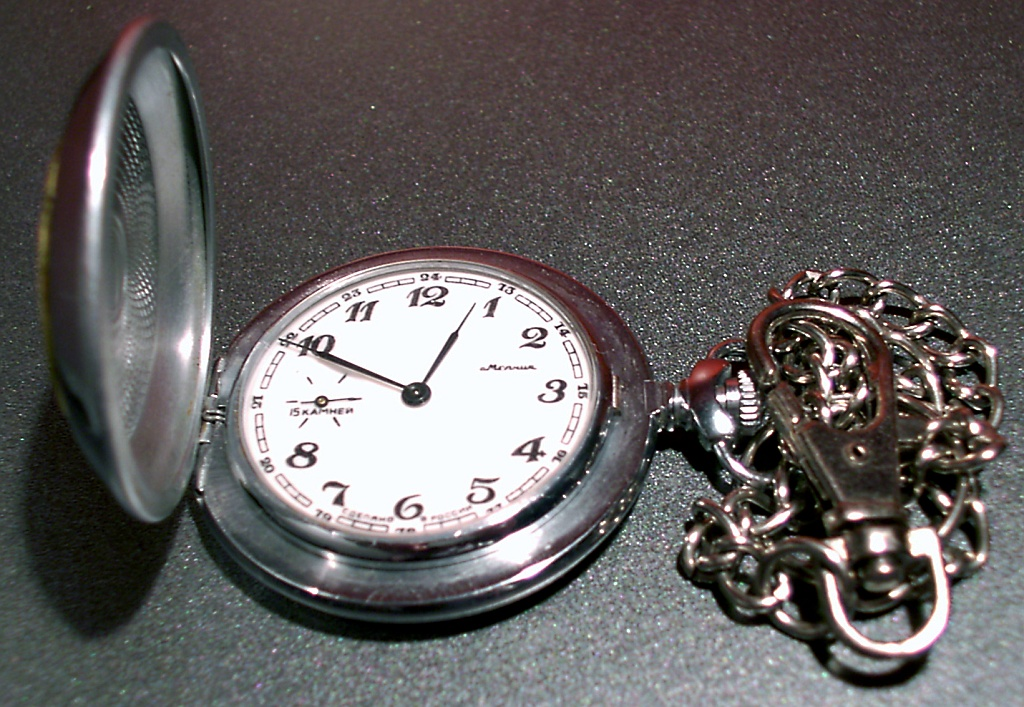
Molnija pocket watch

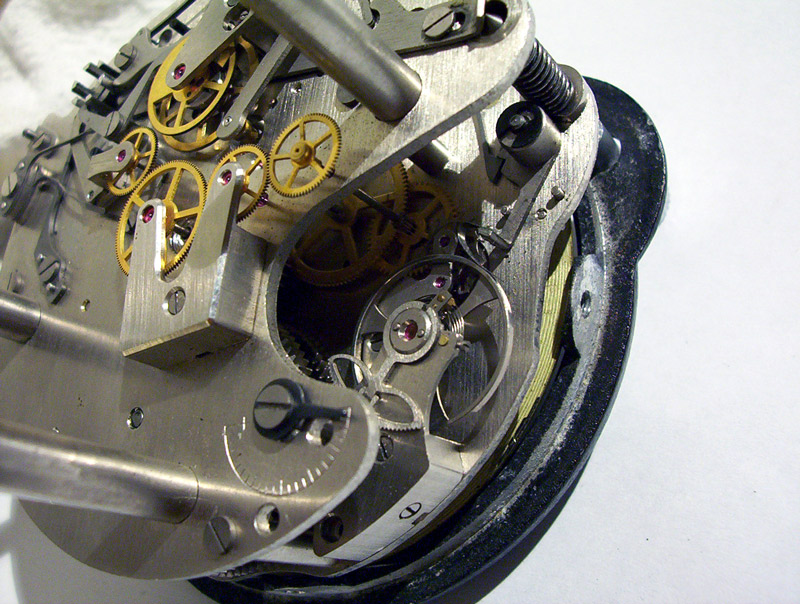
Molnija AChS-1 cockpit chronograph mechanism

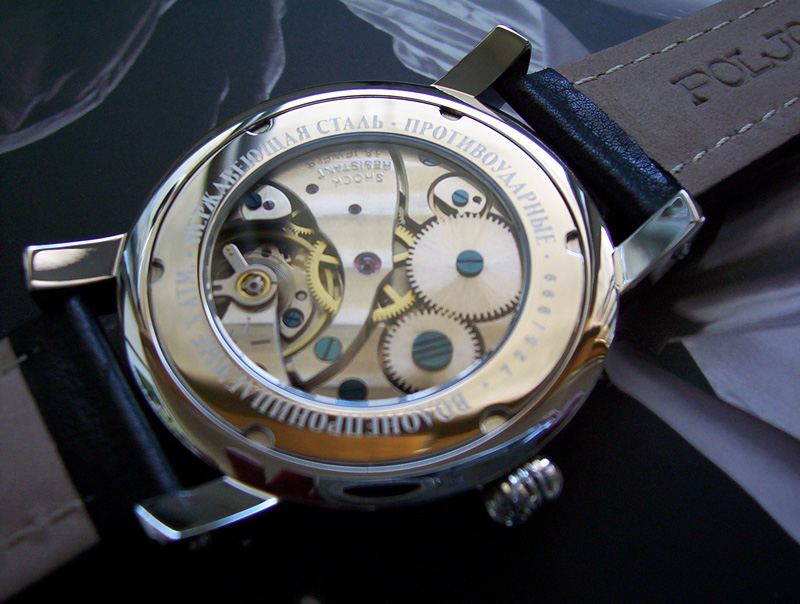
View of a finished Molnija watch movement
