= Omega Bullhead =

The Omega Bullhead was introduced in 1969 as part of the Chronostop range, it was marketed as drivers / rally watch and was nicknamed the "Bullhead" because of the configuration of the winding crown being located at 12 o'clock with the chronograph pushers on either side.

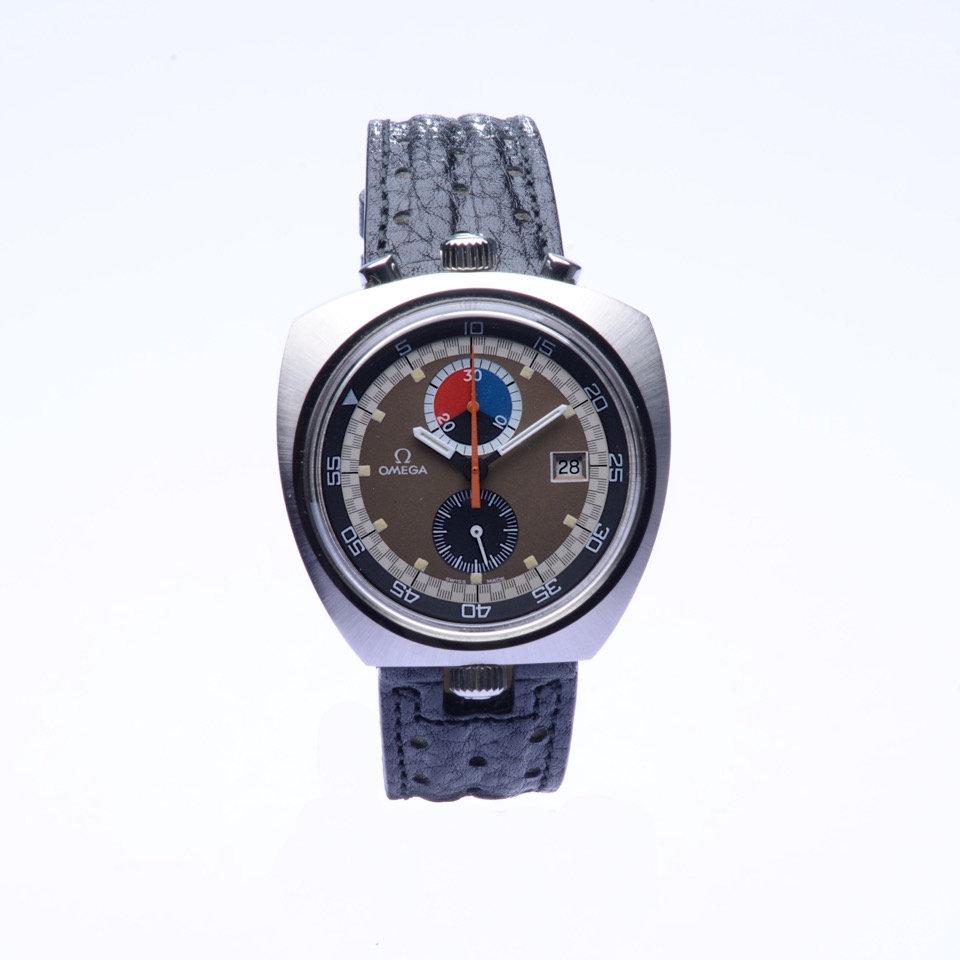
Omega Bullhead Chronograph

== Introduction ==
The calibre 930 was introduced in 1969 in both Omega Seamaster Bullhead and De-Ville models. The watch was produced by Omega SA watches as a twin register chronograph with date in stainless steel models and gold plated models. The movement was manual wind and was an evolution of the calibre 27 CHRO used as part of the wider Omega range but with date function

The Omega Bullhead was marketed as a drivers / Rally watch as part of the chronostop range of watches and like others in the range was quirky in both design and colour configuration of the dial.

== Production watches ==
The movement was an evolution of Omega's 27 CHRO range and formed part of the wider 861 family of watches, developed from the 320 and 321 series. The movement was manual wind with date.

The 930 movement was only used in two models, both of which were stainless steel or gold plated.

1) The Omega De-Ville calibre 930 with twin side-by-side chronograph in stainless steel or gold plated cases. The watch was marketed as a dress chronograph with silver, black or gold dial configurations. The winding crown was located at the traditional three o’clock position with over and under chronograph pushers.

2) The Omega Seamaster Bullhead calibre 930 with over and under chronograph function in stainless steel. The watch marketed as a sports / drivers watch as part of the chronostop range and featured and internal rotating bezel which could be adjusted through a crown at six o’clock.

The Bullhead has its nickname due to the main winding crown being located at 12 o’clock and the chronograph pushers being located either side. The watch was also unique in design as the case was much thicker at the top than the bottom meaning the watch sat higher on the wrist at 12 o’clock than it did at six o’clock.

== Further developments ==
The Bullhead variation of the calibre 930 movement was also produced branded by Bucherer and Lemania as well a Richard chronograph. There was also a non date variation produced by Lemania without the internal rotating bezel as well as a composite cased model produced by Tissot as part of their Sidereal range.

== Summary ==
The calibre 930 was relatively short lived and was not originally popular. At the time of introduction quartz watch technology such as the Omega Electroquartz was taking off and there was already a significantly established line of Omega chronographs which was complimented in the early 1970s by a range of automatic Omega Chronographs under calibre 1040, 1041 (the world's first chronometer chronograph used in the Omega Speedmaster 125) and 1045 as well as a range of electronic chronographs branded as Speedsonic and using a tuning fork movement with additional chronograph module.

The Bullhead variation of the calibre 930 is now a very desirable watch and highly sought after by collectors because of its relatively short lived life span (produced for one year only in 1969) and interesting case design and dial configuration.

The watch was reintroduced in to the Omega range in 2014 utilizing a new coaxial chronometer movement but remaining true to the original design.
