= Omega Electroquartz =

First Swiss quartz watch to be produced

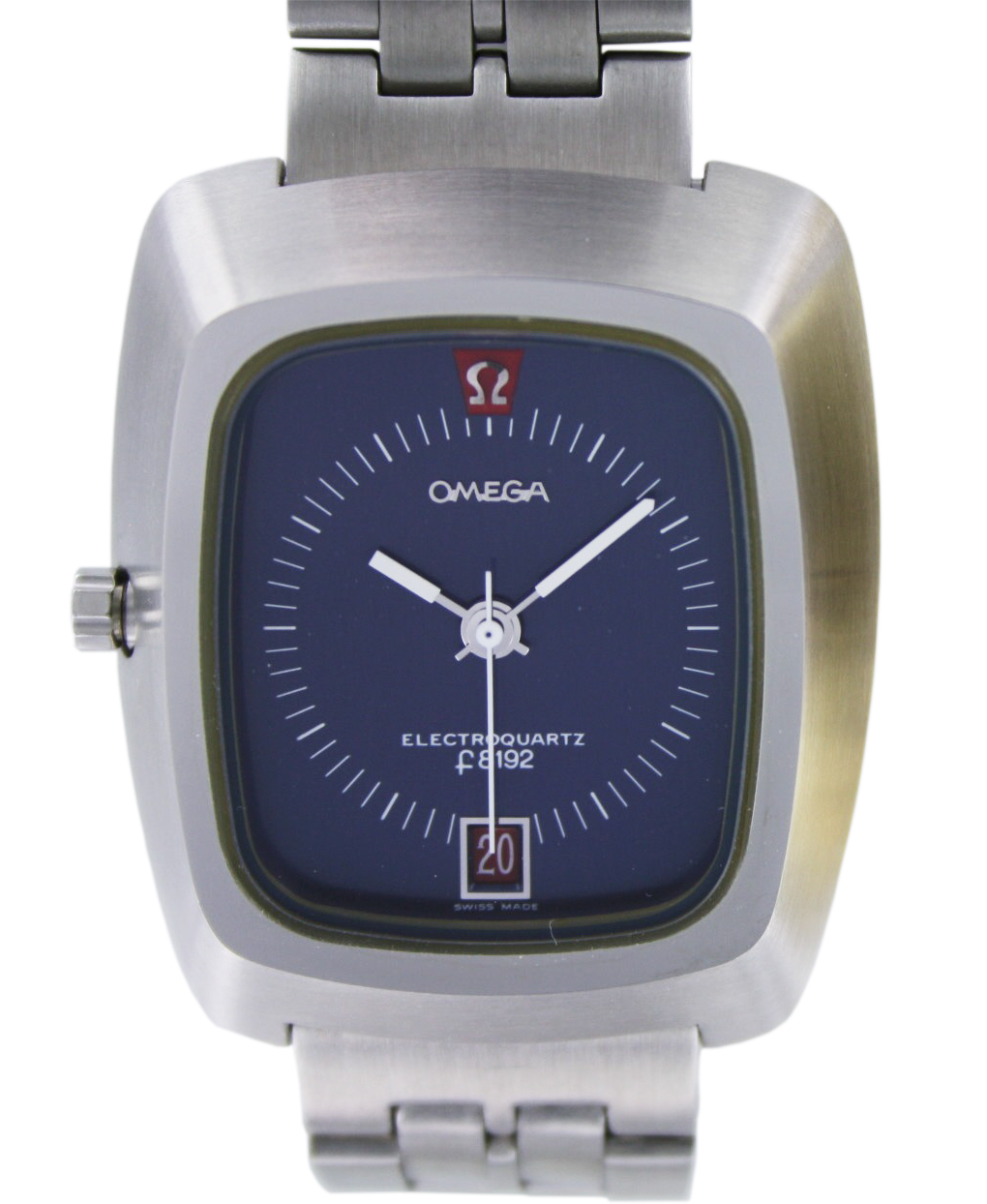
Electroquartz beta 21 calibre 1300

The Omega Electroquartz was introduced in 1969 as the first Swiss quartz watch to be produced. It was the collaboration of 20 Swiss watch companies and the movement was utilised by Rolex, Patek Phillipe and Omega amongst others. The Beta 21 movement used in the Electroquartz was accurate to 5 seconds per month, far better than any automatic or manual wind movement of the day.

== Introduction ==
The Omega Electroquartz was the first Swiss quartz watch produced as part of a range called beta 21 watches, the beta 21 was developed at the CEH research laboratory by twenty Swiss watch manufacturers. The first production watches were introduced to the market in 1970 very shortly after the world's first commercial quartz wristwatch, the Seiko-Quartz Astron 35SQ in December 1969. The beta 21 is noteworthy and significantly important to the history of watch making as well as the Astron as it marked the first quartz watch produced on an industrial level and began the quartz crisis.

Numerous Swiss manufacturers released beta 21 watches, the first Rolex quartz model Texano used the beta 21 movement, Patek Philippe also produce a range of beta 21 models as did the International Watch Company including it in their first Davinci watch.

By far the largest supplier of beta 21 and subsequent beta 22 watches was Omega SA, who produced circa 10,000 Electroquartz watches between 1970 and 1977

== Early development ==
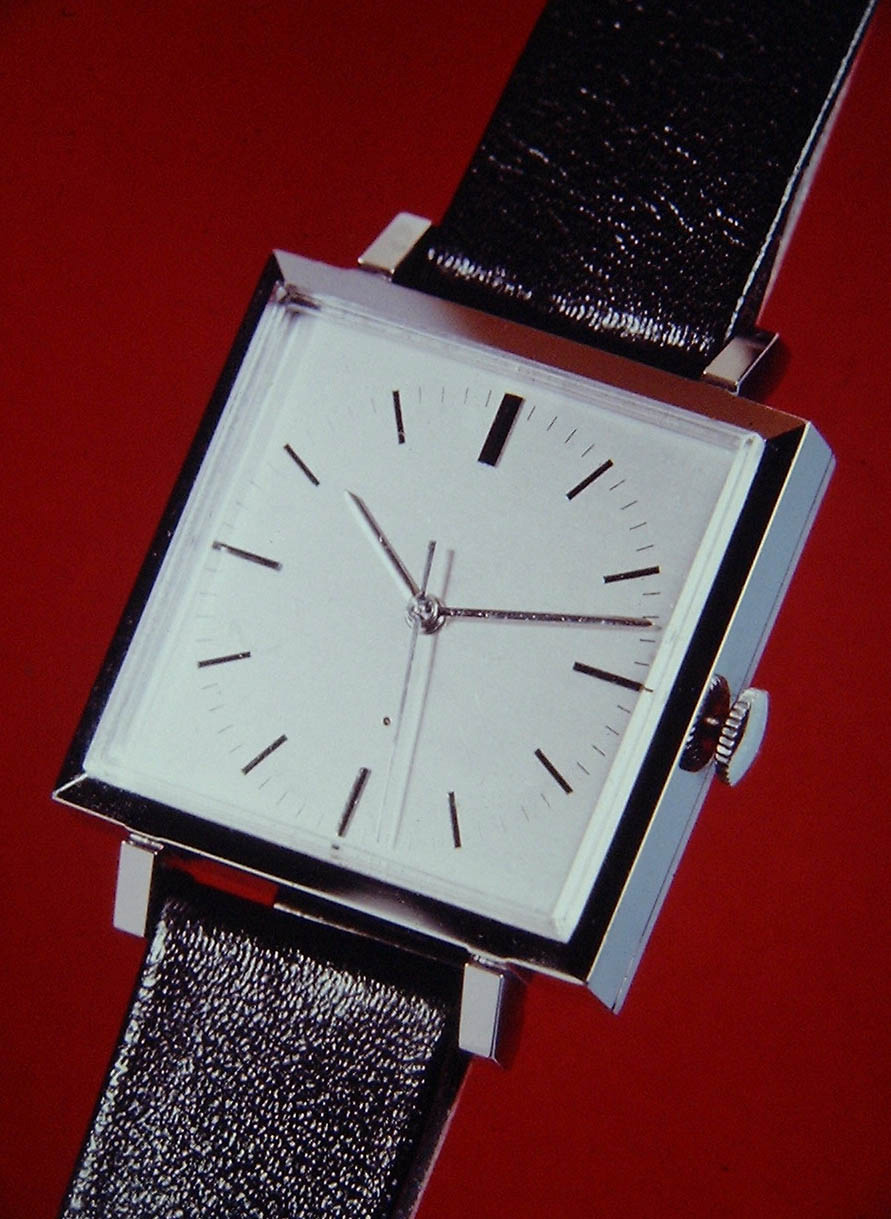
Csem-beta1

In 1966 after six years of research at Centre Electronique Horloger laboratories in Neuchâtel (CEH), Switzerland the first prototype of a quartz wristwatch was produced, the beta-1, this was the first real quartz wristwatch and operated using an 8192 Hz quartz oscillator, which was mounted to an in-house integrated circuit.

In 1967 the beta-2 was tested and was awarded 'Concours Chronométrique International de l'Observatoire de Neuchâtel' setting a new record for wristwatch accuracy over the test period of 0.003 seconds per day, by contrast even the best chronometers of the day were accurate to around 3–10 seconds per day.

In 1969, two years after the beta-2 tests twenty Swiss watch companies agreed to manufacture 6000 of the beta 21 production watches produced on an industrial level.

In late 1969 a few hundred beta 21 units were produced to exhibit from a range of the agreed manufacturers at the 1970 Basel Fair. These production watches were accurate to 5 seconds per month, far better than any automatic or manual wind chronometer at the time and an enormous leap in accurate time keeping. The movement was a modular design and components were manufactured by individual companies (such as Omega who made the micro motor) and then assembled at three workshops.

The beta 21 watches had a sweeping second hand, which moved smoothly round the dial and ‘hummed’ thanks to the Omega vibrating micro motor.

== Production watches ==
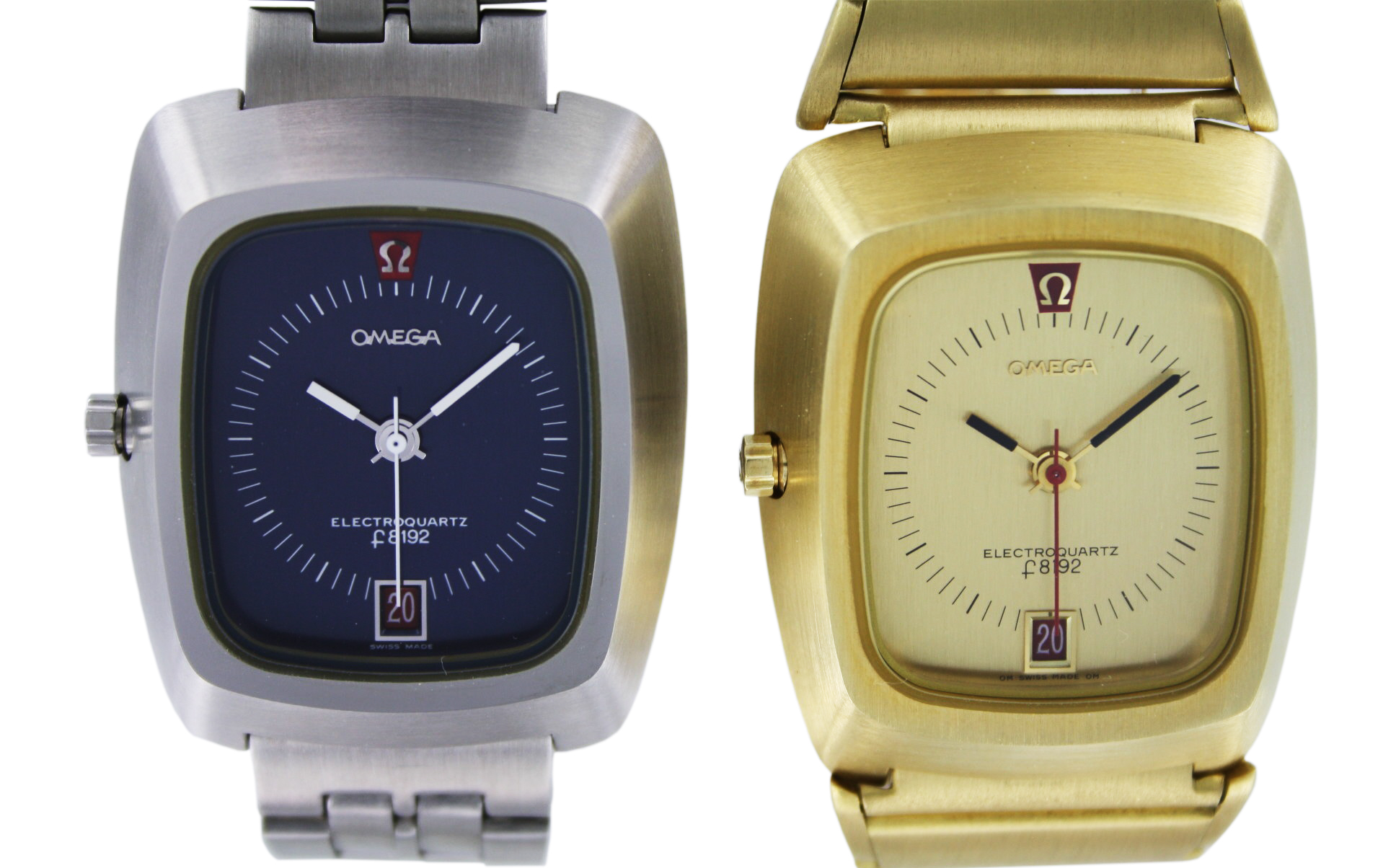
Electroquartz first generation stainless steel and 18-carat gold

Although 20 watch companies were originally involved in the development of the beta 21 production watch under CEH, not all of these companies took this to production stage. It is indicated that 18 Swiss manufacturers showed beta 21 watches at the 1970 Basel Fair.

Between 1970 and 1971 6,000 beta 21 units were manufactured (Omega's calibre was 1300).

To date there are only known of surviving examples from 12 of the original manufacturers and a number of these are not complete watches:

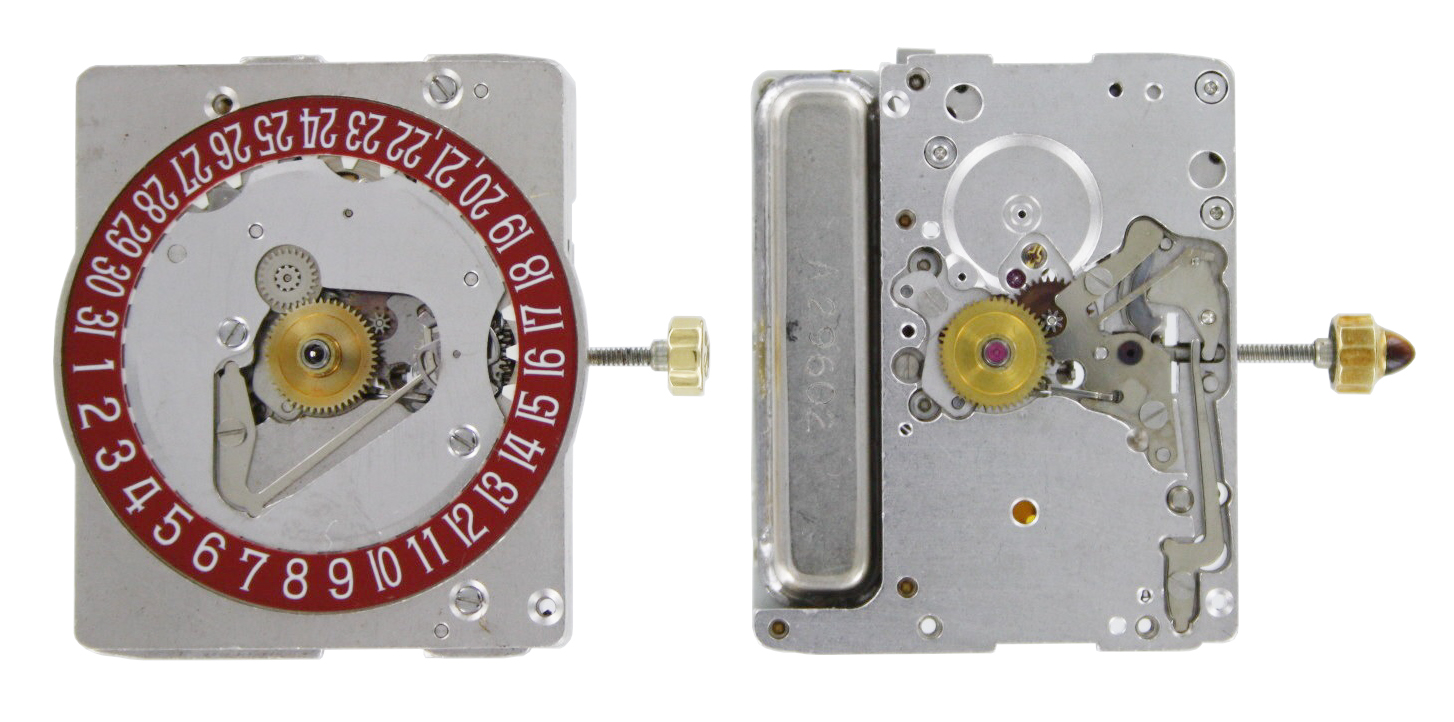
Omega Electroquartz date and non date movements front

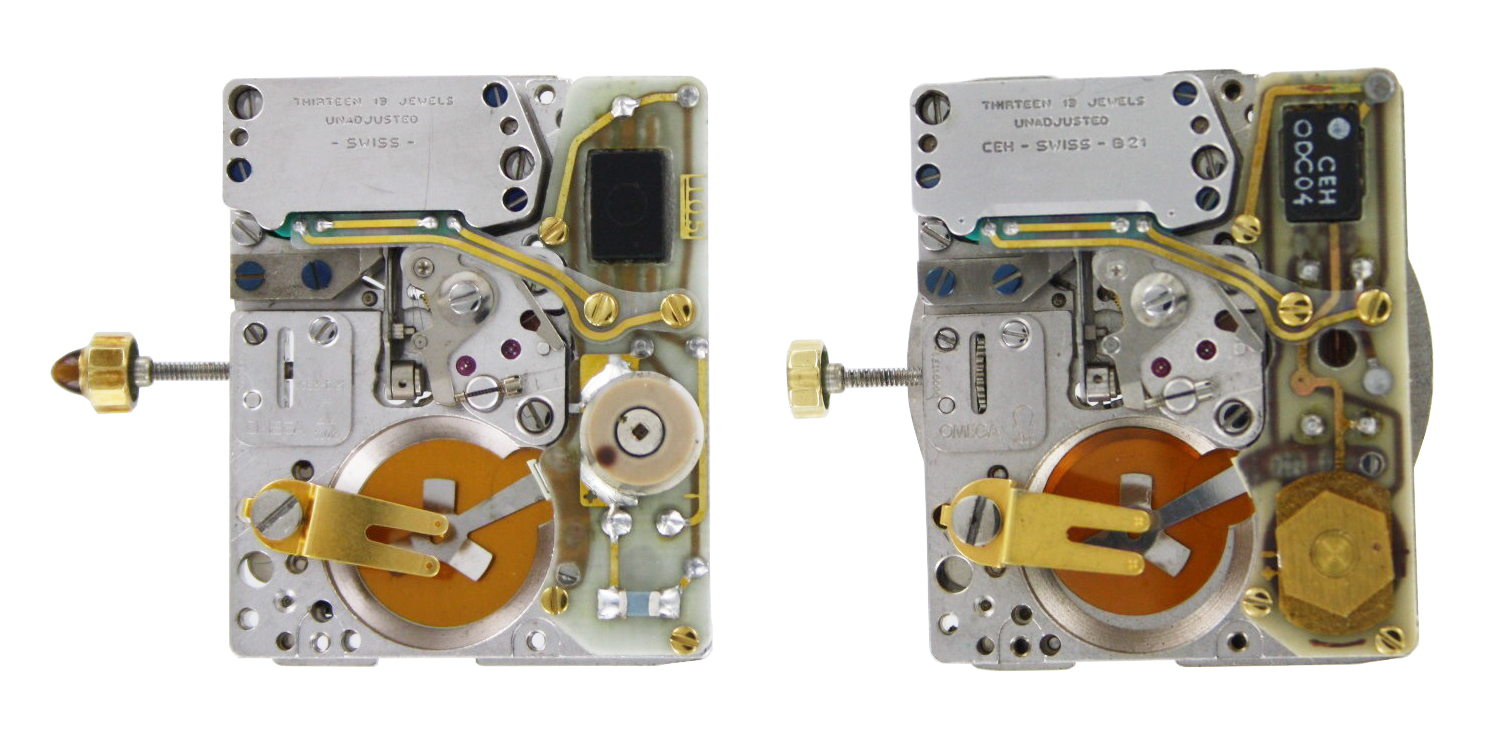
Omega Electroquartz date and non date movements rear

1. Bucherer : Branded as Bucherer Quartz and available in 18-carat gold or stainless steel models.

2. Bulova:Branded as Accuquartz, available in an 18-carat gold models.

3. Favre-Leuba: This has only ever been seen as a movement with dial and not as a production watch.

4. International Watch Company: Branded as Davinci, International and also as a pocket watch available in a range of precious metals and stainless steel.

5. Jaeger-LeCoultre: Branded as Masterquartz however this has only been seen as a movement with dial and not as a production watch.

6. Omega SA: Branded as Electroquartz and available in 18-carat gold and stainless steel models

7: Longines: Branded as Quartz-Chron, this has only ever been seen as a single production watch in stainless steel.

8. Patek Philippe: Branded as Cercle d'Or available in 18-carat gold models.

9. Piaget: Available in 18-carat gold as date and non date models.

10. Rado: Branded as Quartz 8192, available in Stainless steel and made circa 400 examples.

11. Rolex: Branded as Oysterquartz calibre 5100 available in 18-carat gold.

12. Zenith: This has only ever been seen as a movement without dial and not as a production watch.

Omega's version of the beta 21 wristwatch came in the form of the Electroquartz, the case design was larger at the top than the bottom and as such it gained the nickname 'pupitre' after the French word for writing desk. Omega took 5 examples of the electroquartz to the 1970 Basel Fair in 18-carat gold with integral bracelet and displayed them in a row running continually at exactly the same time to demonstrate their accuracy, they sold all five examples at the Basel Fair.

Shortly after the 1970 fair the Electroquartz became commercially available to the public in 18-carat gold and Stainless Steel, both with the pupitre case design at a cost of £1150 in 18-carat yellow gold with integral bracelet and £330 in Stainless steel on bracelet, by contrast the Moonwatch on bracelet was £93.50 and the now coveted Omega Bullhead was only £90.50.

== Further developments ==
According to records between 1972 and 1974 50,000 beta 22s were produced (Omega's calibres were 1301 and 1302), although only a tiny number of these appear to have ever made it to production watches based on the availability of used examples now. The beta 22 was a development of the beta 21 available in date and non date models with refined quartz circuits.

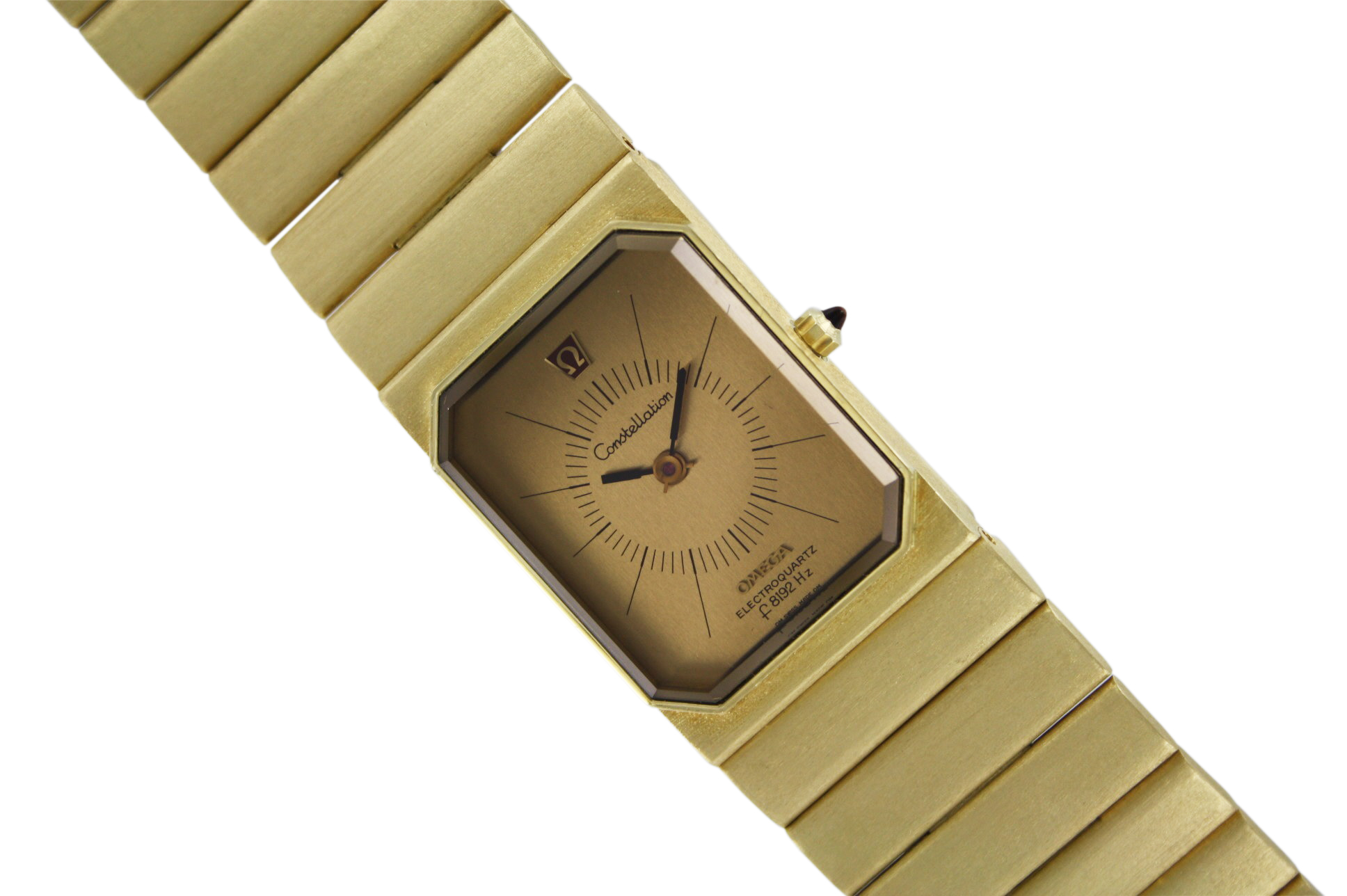
Electroquartz 2nd generation 18-carat gold

Rolex and Patek Philippe as well as IWC and Piaget (amongst others in the original group) produced very small numbers of beta 21/22 watches and towards the mid part of the 1970s all were moving away from the beta 21/22 movement (because of their cost, including the massive R&D costs) and towards more modern quartz technology, including Rolex developing their own in house Oysterquartz movement, which remained in production from 1977 until 2001.

Omega SA made the most use of the beta 21 and beta 22 calibre and kept it in their range of watches until circa 1977. Throughout this period of time Omega produced a number of variations of the Electroquartz Constellation wristwatch, most famously the pupitre but also in a rectangular case in Stainless steel as well as other date and non date models.

Omega's experimentation with case design throughout the 1970s was never more obvious than in the Electroquartz range of watches, there were numerous case executions, many of the later calibre 1301 and 1302 examples being made in 18-carat yellow or white gold. Omega's range of watches during the 1970s was extensive and included usually three or four Electroquartz variations every year, although they competed with the wider range of Omega products including other quartz watches like the Megaquartz series, the majority of them were precious metal and as such were priced towards the very top end of the Omega line up. The pictured 18-carat non date example sold, when new in 1974, for £2,006, by contrast Omegas then flagship chronograph, the limited edition Speedmaster 125 sold for £186.50.

== Omega Electroquartz clock ==
In addition to the beta 21 Electroquartz watches Omega also developed an 8192 Hz Electroquartz clock, this was Omega SA's first quartz production quartz clock and used a thermo-compensated quartz bar and integrated circuit, produced in very small numbers under caliber 1390.

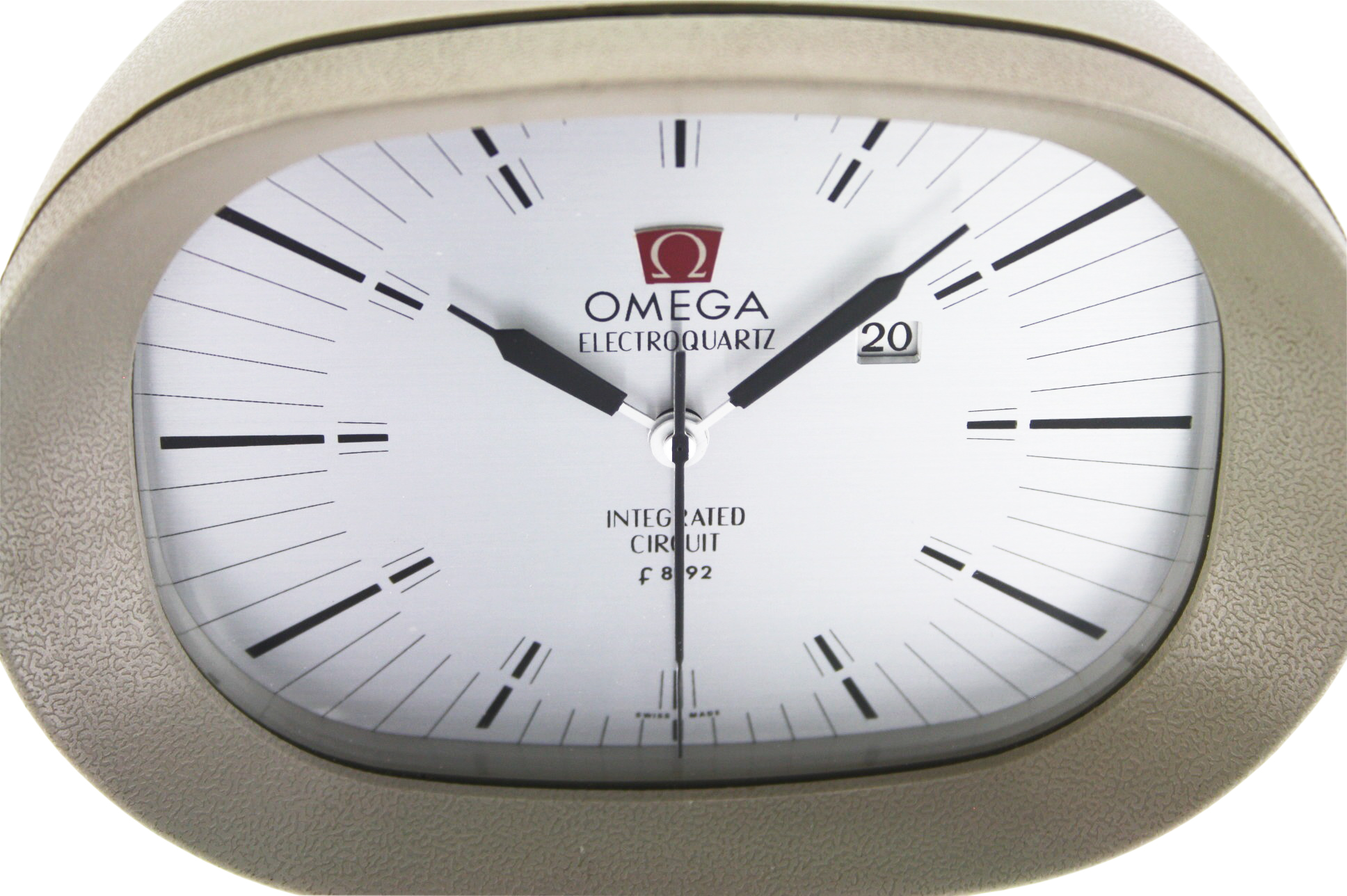
EQ clock

The quartz clock was supplied in a stylish grey Cycolac resin case, because of the size and complexities of the movement the clock was quite large and weighed in at over 1 kilo.

The clock runs on 4 AA type batteries and has an accuracy of circa 12 seconds per year. It features time and date and has a lever for manually trimming the seconds without interfering with the operation of the watch.

There are very few remaining examples of these clocks, other than those on display at the Omega museum in Bienne and Swiss Time Services in the UK, and there are less than 10 known examples in private collections. The pictured clock (owned by Omega collector Thomas Dick) is serviced and working correctly and is accurate to 12 seconds per year, which is within specification of +/- 1 second per month when kept at a constant temperature of between 10 °C and 30 °C.

== Summary ==
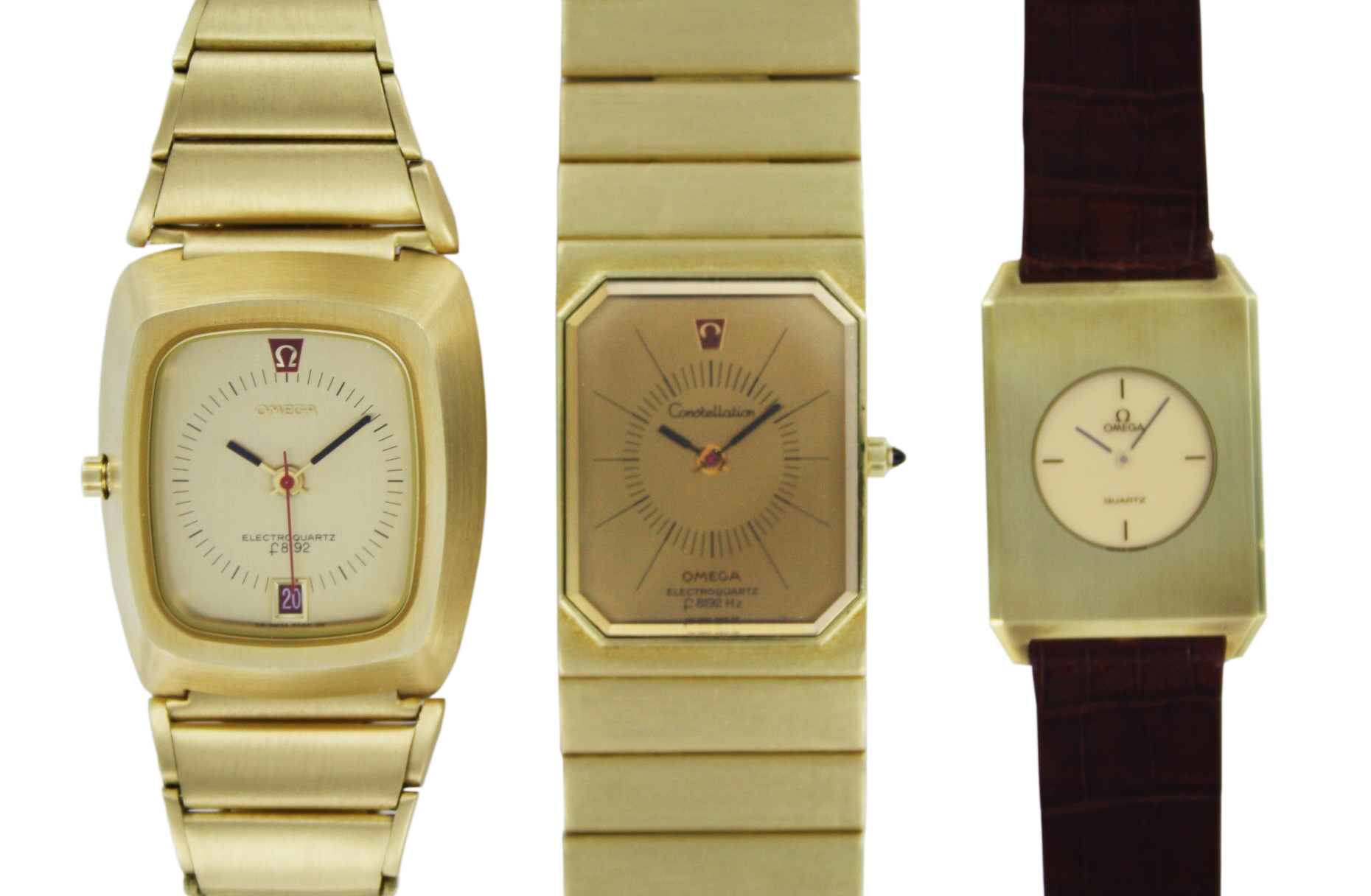
Omega Electroquartz generation 1 and 2 compared to Omega Dinosaur, watches sourced by Thomas Dick

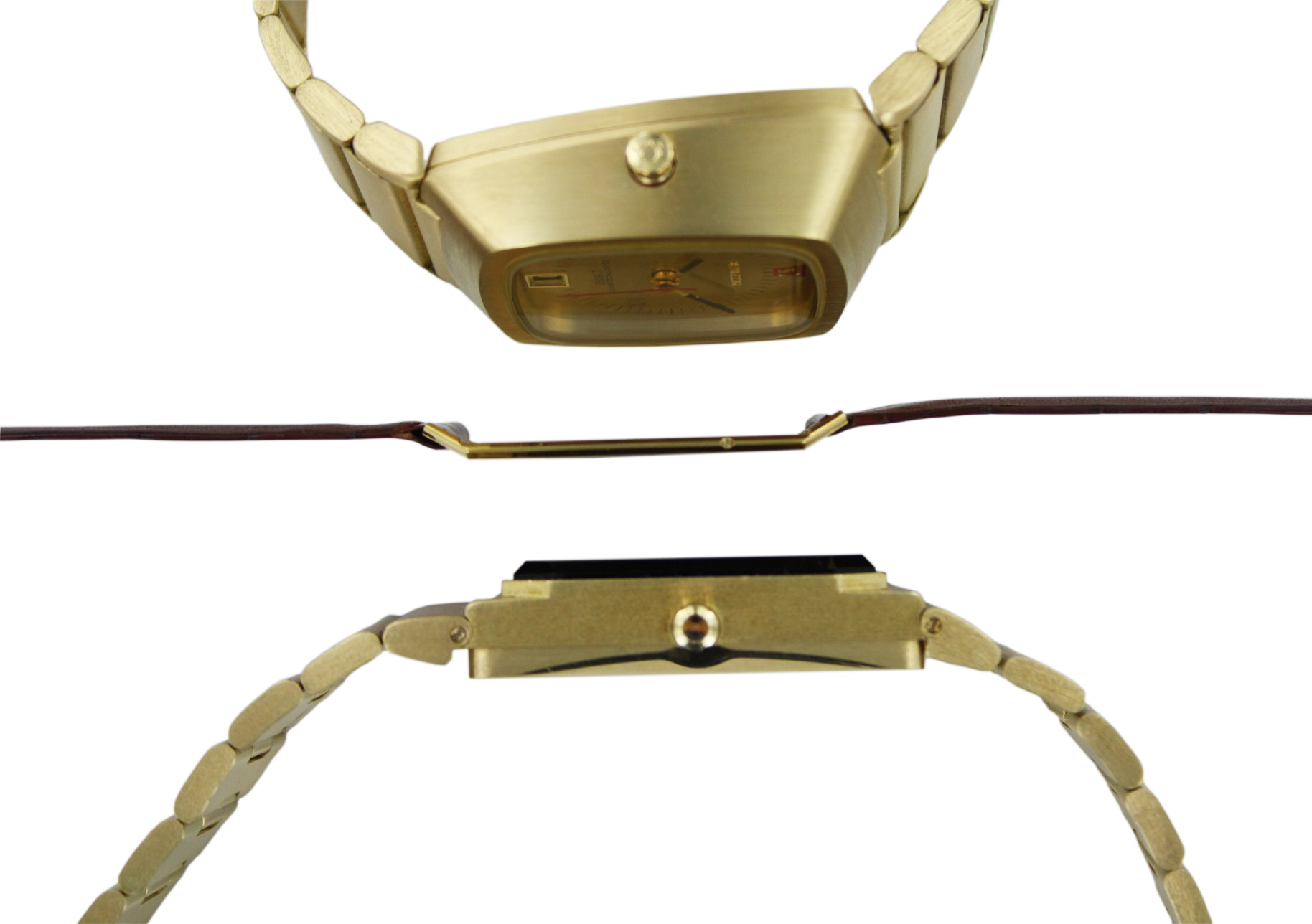
Omega Electroquartz / Dinosaur comparison

Despite the significance of the beta 21 series of watches the speed of development of quartz wristwatches during the 1970s as well as the influx of reliable quartz technology from Japan meant that the beta 21 and beta 22 wristwatches became obsolete almost as they came into initial production.

Omega's development of their own in house Megaquartz range of watches developed by SSIH included the reliable 32 kHz lines (accurate to 5 seconds per month) as well as their flagship Omega Marine Chronometer (accurate to 12 seconds per year) rendered even Omegas efforts to reap their investment very difficult.

By the end of the 1970s and into the early 1980s the industry had made such advances in quartz watch technology that Omega were producing 18-carat models which were less than 2mm thick (the dinosaur) which were accurate to 5 seconds per month, as shown in the attached image of watches, which is a stark demonstration of how far quartz technology watches had progressed in less than a decade.

Within ten years of the introduction of the beta 21 the Swiss watch industry was in a quartz crisis. Technology had developed so quickly that quartz movements had become smaller, thinner, more accurate and more reliable whilst being significantly cheaper to manufacture. The influx of cheap, well-made and reliable quartz watches from non Swiss manufacturers mixed with the lack of progress made by the majority of the Swiss watch making industry led to the demise of numerous manufacturers and nearly toppled giants like Omega.

Beta 21 and Beta 22 watches are collectible. Precious metal Rolex and Patek Phillipe models can be more than $20,000. Most versions are made by Omega, with prices starting at around US$500 for a typical stainless steel variant. Prices increase depending on the model, rarity, and metals used. Collectible early quartz watches have increased in value and are an important development in wristwatch technology of the 20th century.
