= Analog watch =

Watch with a traditional clock face

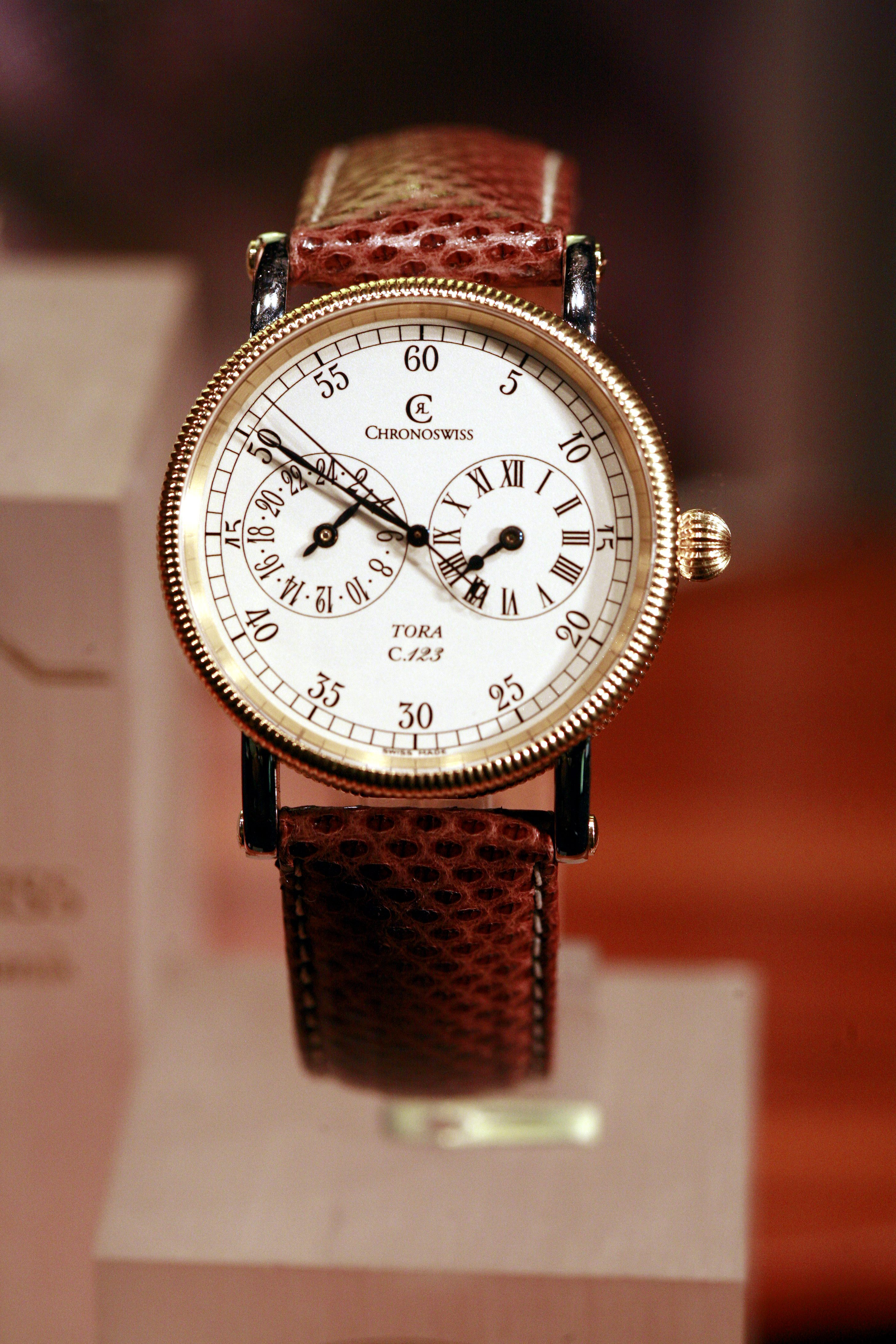
An analog watch

A method to identify north and south directions using the sun and a 12-hour analogue clock or watch set to the local time, 10:10 a.m. in this example

An analog watch (American) or analogue watch (UK and Commonwealth) is a watch whose display is not digital but rather analog with a traditional clock face. The name is an example of a retronym; it was coined to distinguish analog watches, which had simply been called "watches", from newer digital watches. It strictly refers to the design of the display, regardless of the timekeeping technology used within the watch movement or module, although its counterpart, "digital watch", usually connotes (in most minds) digital electronics in both. A digital watch is one in which the time is displayed as a series of digits, e.g. "04:32". An analog watch is one in which the display is not digital, but is indicated (typically) by the continuous motion of one, two, or three rotating pointers or hands pointing to numbers arrayed on a circular dial (the hour hand's movement being analogous to the path of the sun across the sky).

== Reading the time on an analog watch ==
An analog watch has hands to show the time. One for the hours is short and thick. One for the minutes is long and thin. And sometimes one for the seconds which is long and very thin, this is clearly the second hand because it goes round 60 times faster than the minute hand and 720 times faster than the hour hand. Some Analog watches do not have numbers printed onto them; the numbers can still be determined because the strap is always at 12 & 6. Often only the 12 o'clock position is marked, or only the 12, 3, 6 & 9 positions.

== Using a watch and the sun as a compass ==
An analog watch can be used to locate north and south. The Sun appears to move in the sky over a 24-hour period while the hour hand of a 12-hour clock takes twelve hours to complete one rotation. In the northern hemisphere, if the watch is rotated so that the hour hand points toward the Sun, the point halfway between the hour hand and 12 o'clock will indicate south. For this method to work in the southern hemisphere, the 12 is pointed toward the Sun and the point halfway between the hour hand and 12 o'clock will indicate north.

During daylight saving time, the same method can be employed using 1 o'clock instead of 12. There are relatively minor inaccuracies due to the difference between local time and zone time, and due to the equation of time. The method functions less well as one gets closer to the equator.
