= Omega Speedmaster =

Chronograph wristwatch, worn by astronauts

Omega
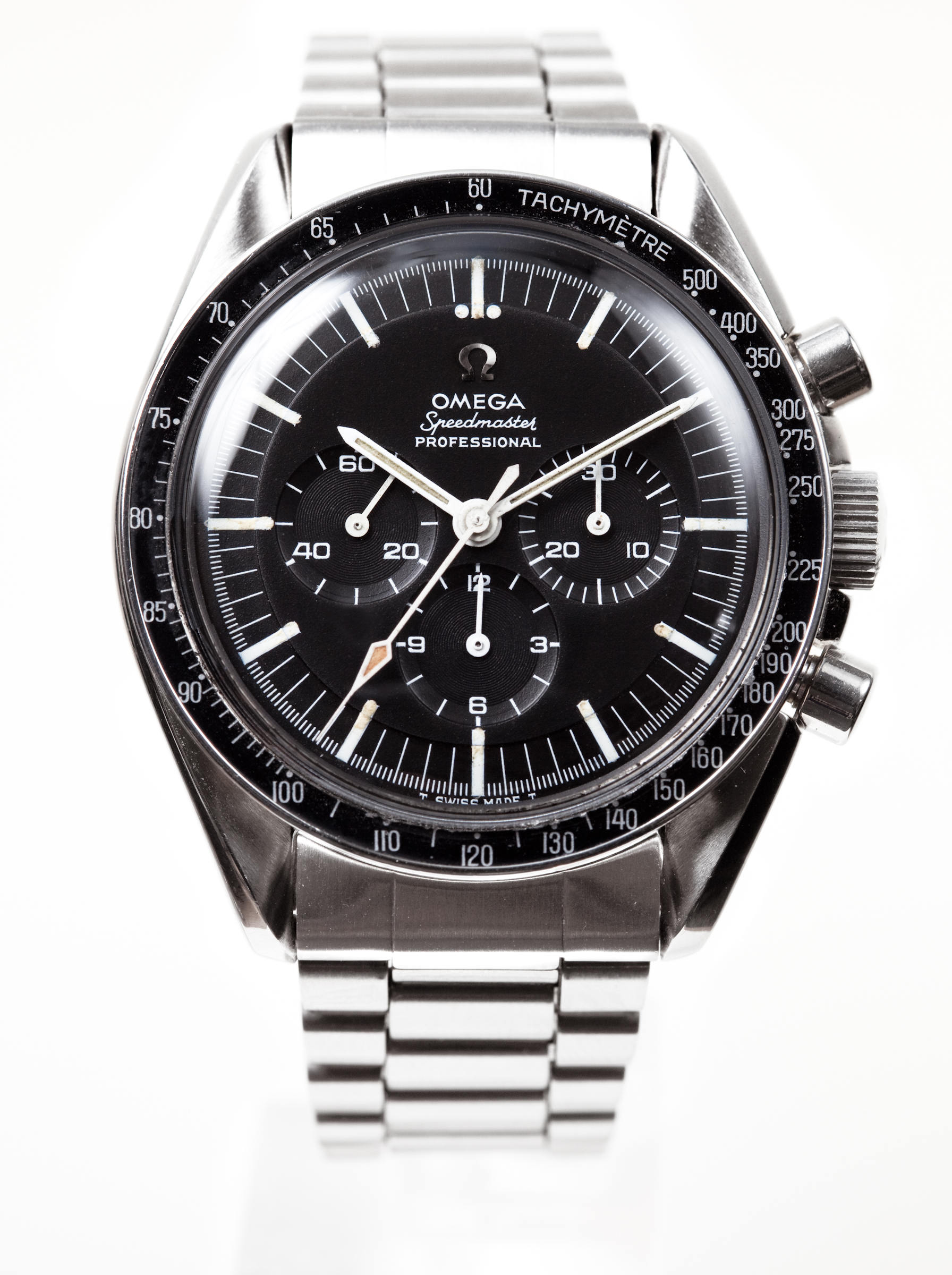
- Vintage Omega Speedmaster ref. 145.012-67
- Manufacturer: Omega
- Also called: Moonwatch
- Introduced: 1957
- Movement: Omega caliber 321, 861, 1861, 3861, others

Omega Speedmaster is a line of luxury chronograph wristwatches produced by Omega SA. While chronographs have existed since the late 1800s, Omega first introduced this line of chronographs in 1957. Since then, many different chronograph movements have been marketed under the Speedmaster name. Astronaut Walter Schirra was the first person to wear one in space in 1962 during his Mercury-Atlas 8 mission. The manual winding Speedmaster Professional or "Moonwatch" is the best-known and longest-produced; it was worn during the first American spacewalk as part of NASA's Gemini 4 mission, and was the first watch worn by an astronaut walking on the Moon during the Apollo 11 mission. The Speedmaster Professional remains one of several watches qualified by NASA for spaceflight, and is still the only one so qualified for EVA. The Speedmaster line also includes other models, including analog-digital and automatic mechanical watches.

== Early development ==
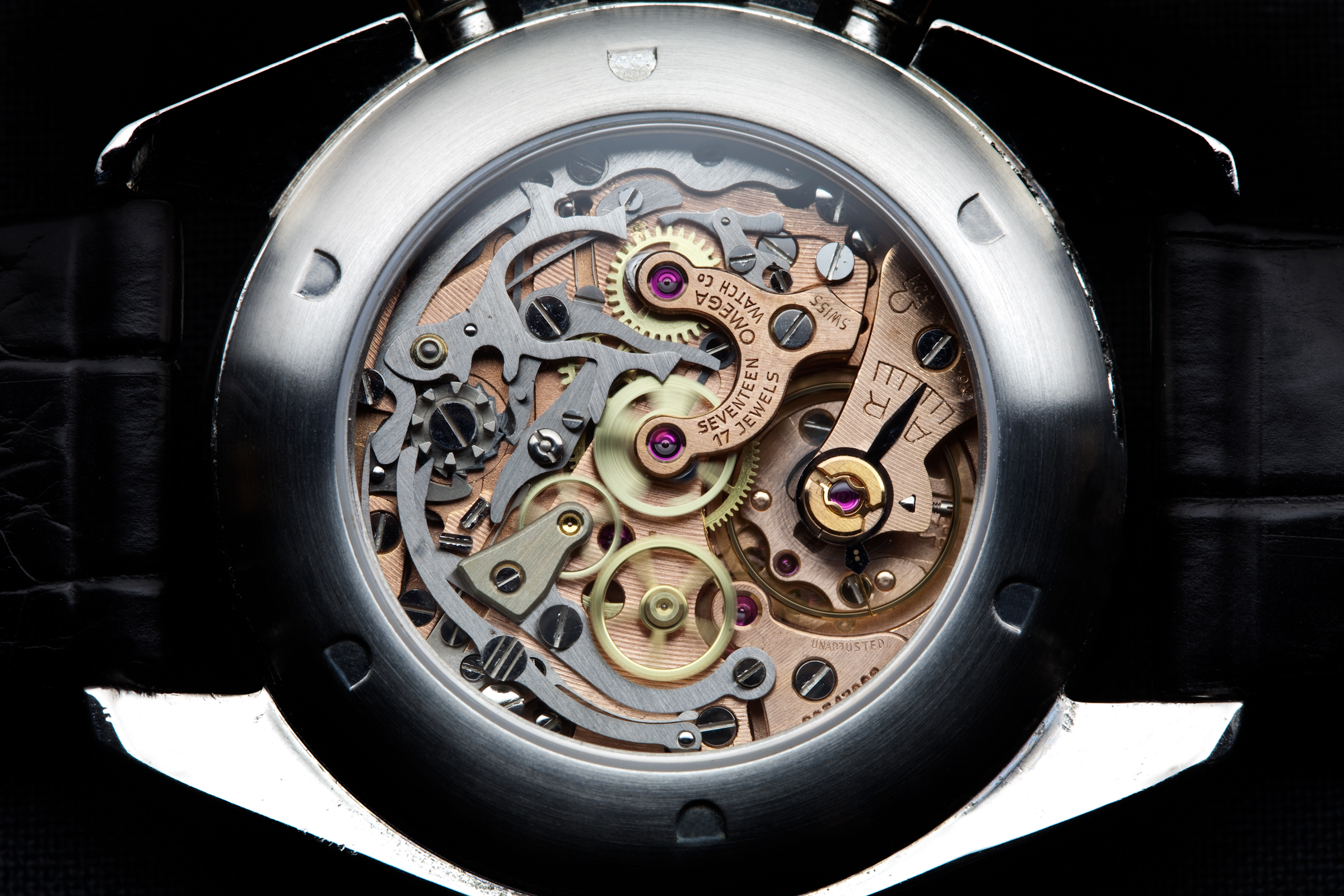
Omega cal. 321 movement

The Speedmaster was not originally designed for space exploration. Instead, it was introduced in 1957 as a sport and racing chronograph following on from the early chronographs of the 1920s and 1930s, including the Omega 28.9 chronograph, which was Omega's first small wrist chronograph, complementing Omega's position as the official timekeeper for the Olympic Games. The first Speedmaster model, the reference CK 2915, was powered by the Omega Calibre 321 movement. This movement was developed in 1946 by Albert Piguet of Lemania, which had been acquired in 1932 by Omega's parent company, Société Suisse pour l'Industrie Horlogère, (SSIH). The "Speedmaster" name was coined from the model's novel tachymeter scale bezel (in brushed stainless steel) and by the convention set by prior Omega brands Seamaster and Railmaster. The model established the series's hallmark 12-hour, triple-register chronograph layout, domed Plexiglas crystal (named Hésalite), and simple, high-contrast index markers; but, unlike most subsequent Speedmaster models, it used Omega's broad arrow hand set. In 1959, a second version, CK 2998, was released with a black aluminum base 1000 bezel and later in 2998-2, tachymeter 500 bezel and alpha hands. This was again updated in 1963 by references ST 105.002, which kept the alpha hands and then less than one year later ST 105.003 with straight baton hands and ST 105.012, the first Speedmaster with the "Professional" appellation on the dial, with an asymmetrical case to protect the chronograph pushers and crown. All of the early Speedmasters used the same Calibre 321 movement, which was only replaced in 1968/1969 with the introduction of the Calibre 861 movement, used in the "Moon watch". The watches used for Apollo 11's mission were the 1967 "pre-Moon" 321 versions.

== Pilots ==
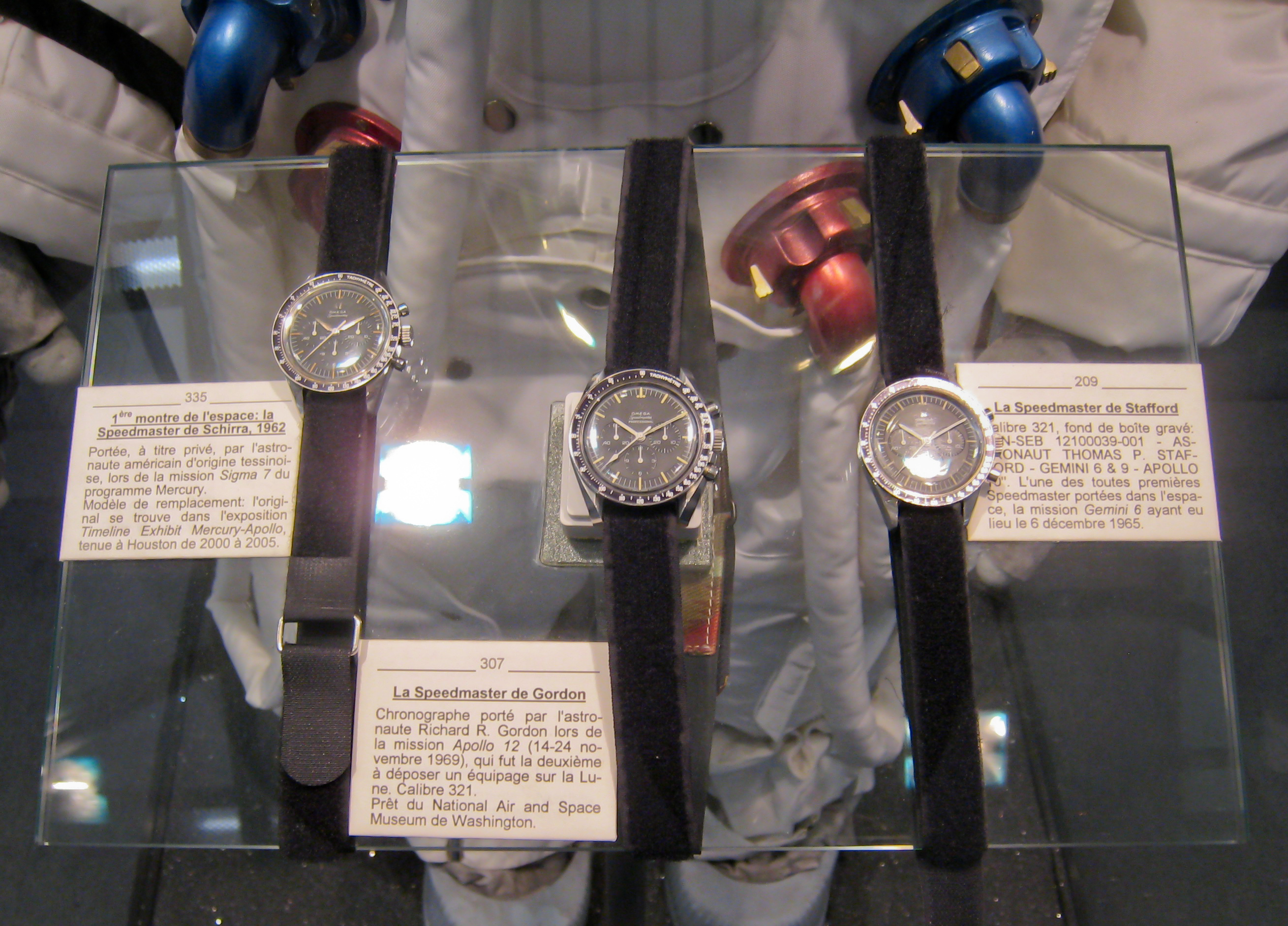
The Speedmaster watches worn by astronauts Walter Schirra (Mercury Sigma 7 mission, 1962), Richard F. Gordon, Jr. (Apollo 12, 1969) and Thomas P. Stafford (Gemini 6, 1965)

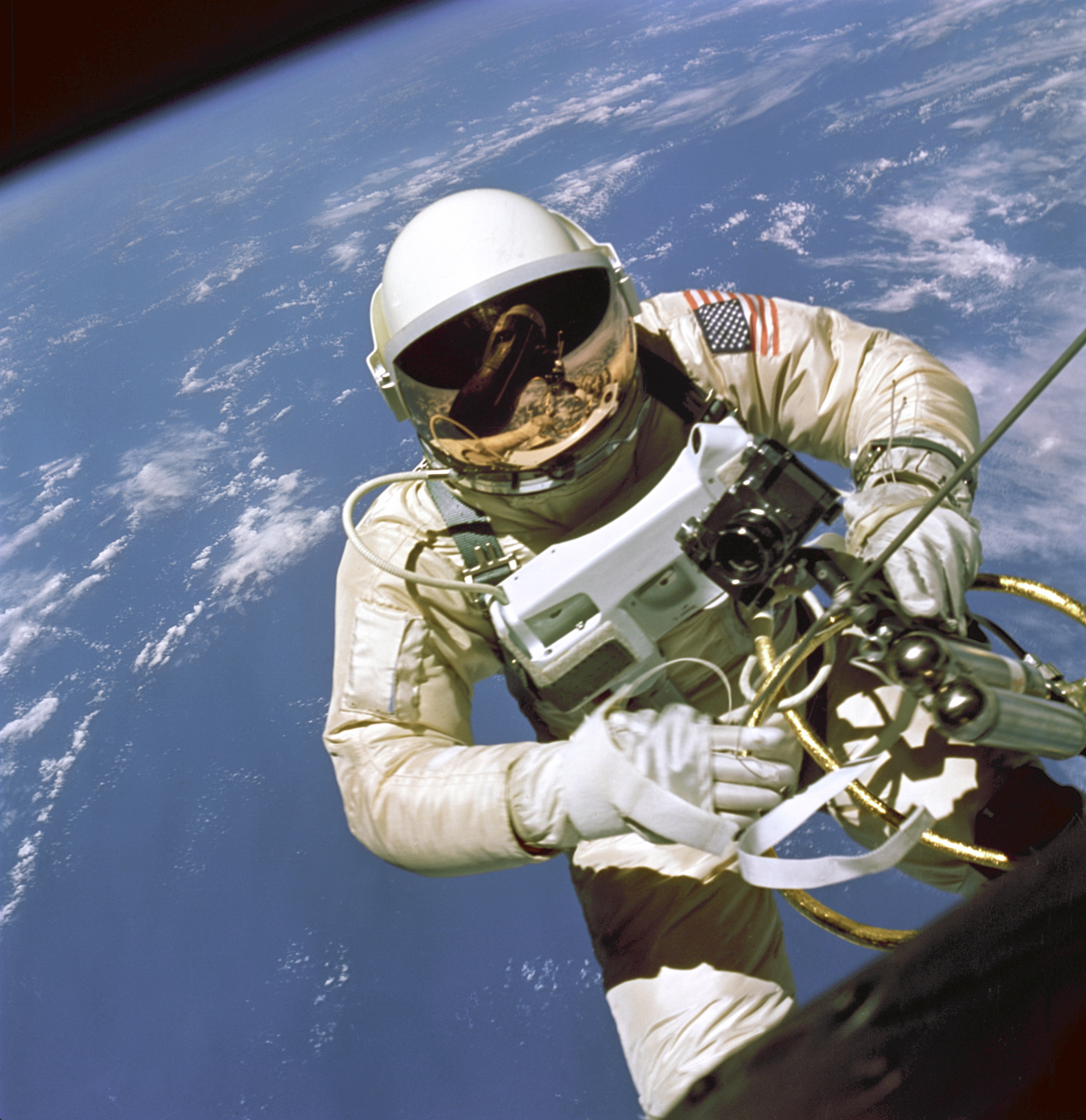
Ed White wearing an Omega Speedmaster on EVA during Gemini 4

Chronographs were first developed for use in artillery for battle, but soon came to be indispensable for use in high performance machinery, specifically by pilots, but later also by race car drivers. Submariners, who also relied heavily on split second timing for what was essentially blind travel, were known for the use of chronographs. The ability to time, and therefore calibrate, fuel consumption, trajectory and other variables allowed for both more efficient travel as well as better pilots and race car drivers. When President Eisenhower decreed that test pilots would be the only permissible option for Project Mercury, the inclusion of a chronograph of some sort was virtually assured.

=== Use in space ===
==== Qualification tests ====
Three years before the Speedmaster's official qualification for space flight, astronaut Wally Schirra took his personal CK 2998 aboard Mercury-Atlas 8 (Sigma 7) on October 3, 1962. That same year, according to an apocryphal anecdote repeated by Omega press materials and trade publications, a number of commercial chronograph wristwatches were furtively purchased from Corrigan's, a Houston jeweler, to evaluate their use for the Gemini and Apollo programs. James Ragan, a former NASA engineer responsible for Apollo flight hardware testing, contradicted this story, calling it a "complete invention". Instead, bids were officially solicited of several brands already familiar to the pilots who were joining the growing astronaut corps. Brands under official consideration included Breitling, Rolex, and Omega, as well as others that produced mechanical chronographs. Hamilton submitted a pocket watch and was disqualified from consideration, leaving three contenders: Rolex, Longines-Wittnauer, and Omega. These watches were all subjected to tests under extreme conditions:

- High temperature: 48 hours at 160 °F (71 °C) followed by 30 minutes at 200 °F (93 °C)
- Low temperature: Four hours at 0 °F (−18 °C)
- Temperature cycling in near-vacuum: Fifteen cycles of heating to 160 °F (71 °C) for 45 minutes, followed by cooling to 0 °F (−18 °C) for 45 minutes at 10^{−6} atm
- Humidity: 250 hours at temperatures between 68 °F (20 °C) and 160 °F (71 °C) at relative humidity of 95%
- Oxygen environment: 100% oxygen at 0.35 atm and 71 °C for 48 hours
- Shock: Six 11 ms 40 g shocks from different directions
- Linear acceleration: from 1 to 7.25 g within 333 seconds
- Low pressure: 90 minutes at 10^{−6} atm at 160 °F (71 °C), followed by 30 minutes at 200 °F (93 °C)
- High pressure: 1.6 atm for one hour
- Vibration: three cycles of 30 minutes vibration varying from 5 to 2000 Hz with minimum 8.8 g impulse
- Acoustic noise: 30 minutes at 130 dB from 40 to 10,000 Hz

All chronographs tested were mechanical hand-wound models. Neither the first automatic chronograph nor the first quartz watch would be available until 1969, well after the space program was underway. The evaluation concluded in March 1965 with the selection of the Speedmaster, which survived the tests while remaining largely within 5 seconds per day rate.

==== Gemini program ====
Gus Grissom and John Young wore the first officially qualified Speedmasters on Gemini 3 on 23 March 1965. In June of that year, Ed White made the first American space walk during Gemini 4 with a Speedmaster 105.003 strapped to the outside of the left-side sleeve of his G4C space suit. In order to accommodate the space suit, the watch was attached via a long nylon strap secured with Velcro. When worn on the wrist, the strap could be wound around several times to shorten its length. According to Omega, the company was surprised to learn of the Speedmaster's role upon seeing a photograph of the EVA; however, ordering forms sent by NASA's Gemini 4 Flight Support Procurement Office to Omega's American agents in 1964 suggest that this anecdote may be exaggerated. These images would be widely used in Omega marketing materials from 1965 to 1967, establishing the popular connection between the Speedmaster and space exploration. Speedmasters were issued to all subsequent Gemini crews until the end of the program in 1966.

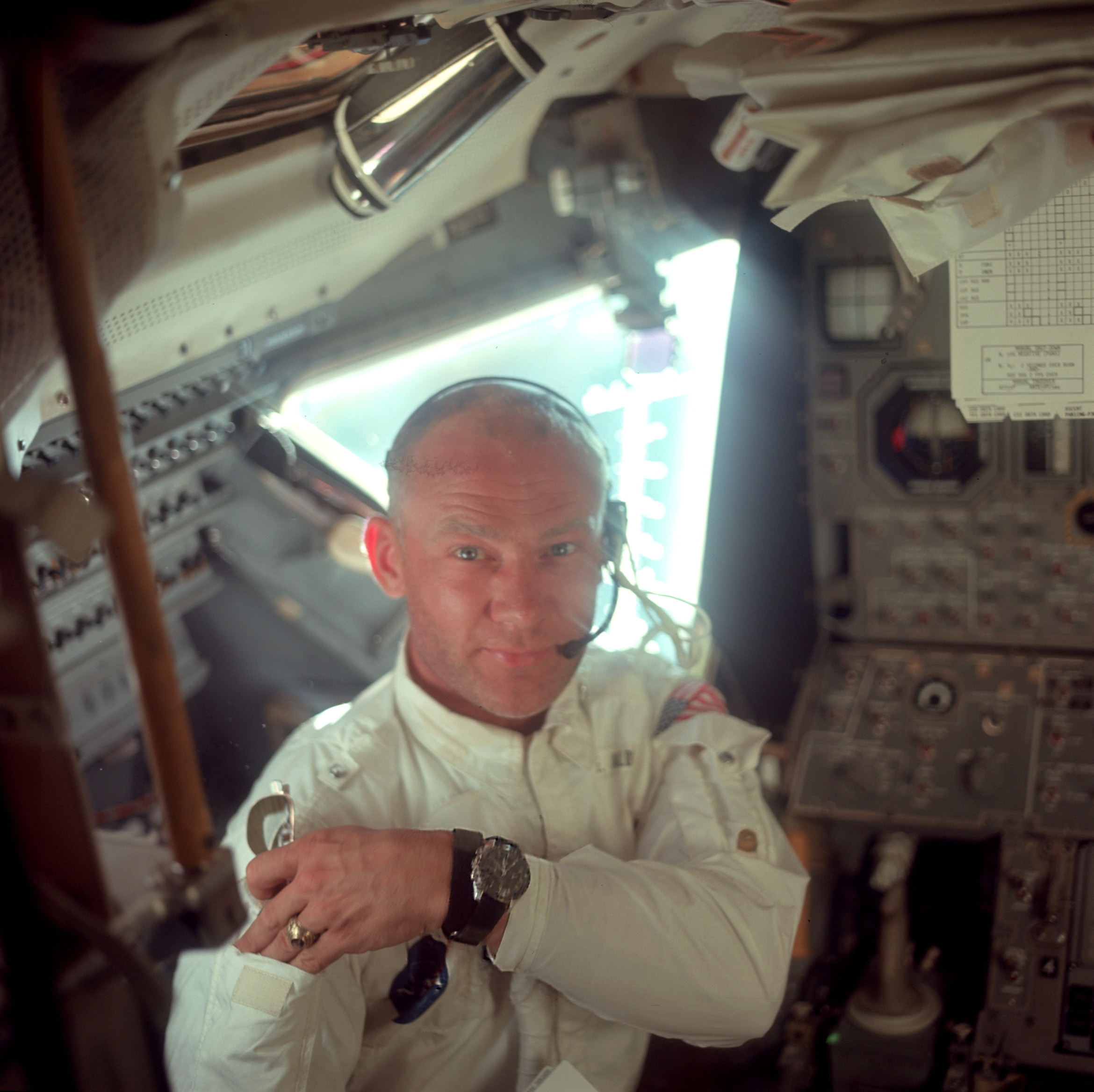
Buzz Aldrin wearing an Omega Speedmaster during Apollo 11

==== Apollo program ====
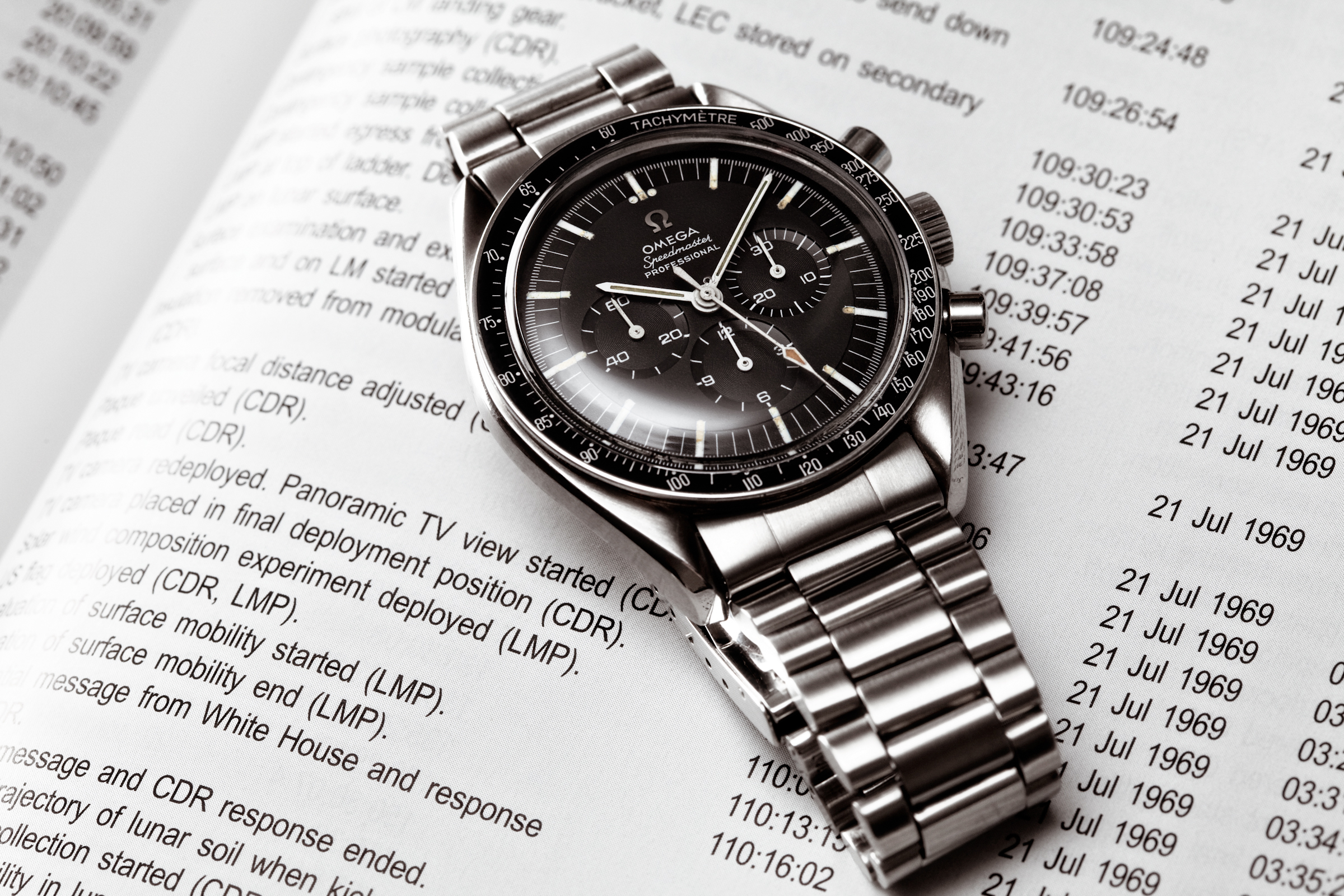
1967 ref. 145.012 Speedmaster

In 1966, Speedmaster reference 105.012 was updated to reference 145.012. These two models would be the two Speedmaster references known to have been worn on the Moon by Apollo astronauts, the original "Moon watches." Speedmasters were used throughout the early crewed Apollo program, and reached the Moon with Apollo 11. Ironically, these and prior models are informally known as "pre-Moon" Speedmasters, since their manufacture predate the Moon landings and lack the inscription subsequent models carry: "The First Watch Worn on the Moon".

Although Apollo 11 commander Neil Armstrong was first to set foot on the Moon, he left his 105.012 Speedmaster inside the lunar module as a backup, because the LM's electronic timer had malfunctioned. Buzz Aldrin elected to wear his, and so his Speedmaster became the first watch to be worn on the Moon. Later, he wrote of his decision:

It was optional to wear while we were walking on the surface of the Moon ... few things are less necessary when walking around on the Moon than knowing what time it is in Houston, Texas. Nonetheless, being a watch guy, I decided to strap the Speedmaster onto my right wrist around the outside of my bulky spacesuit.

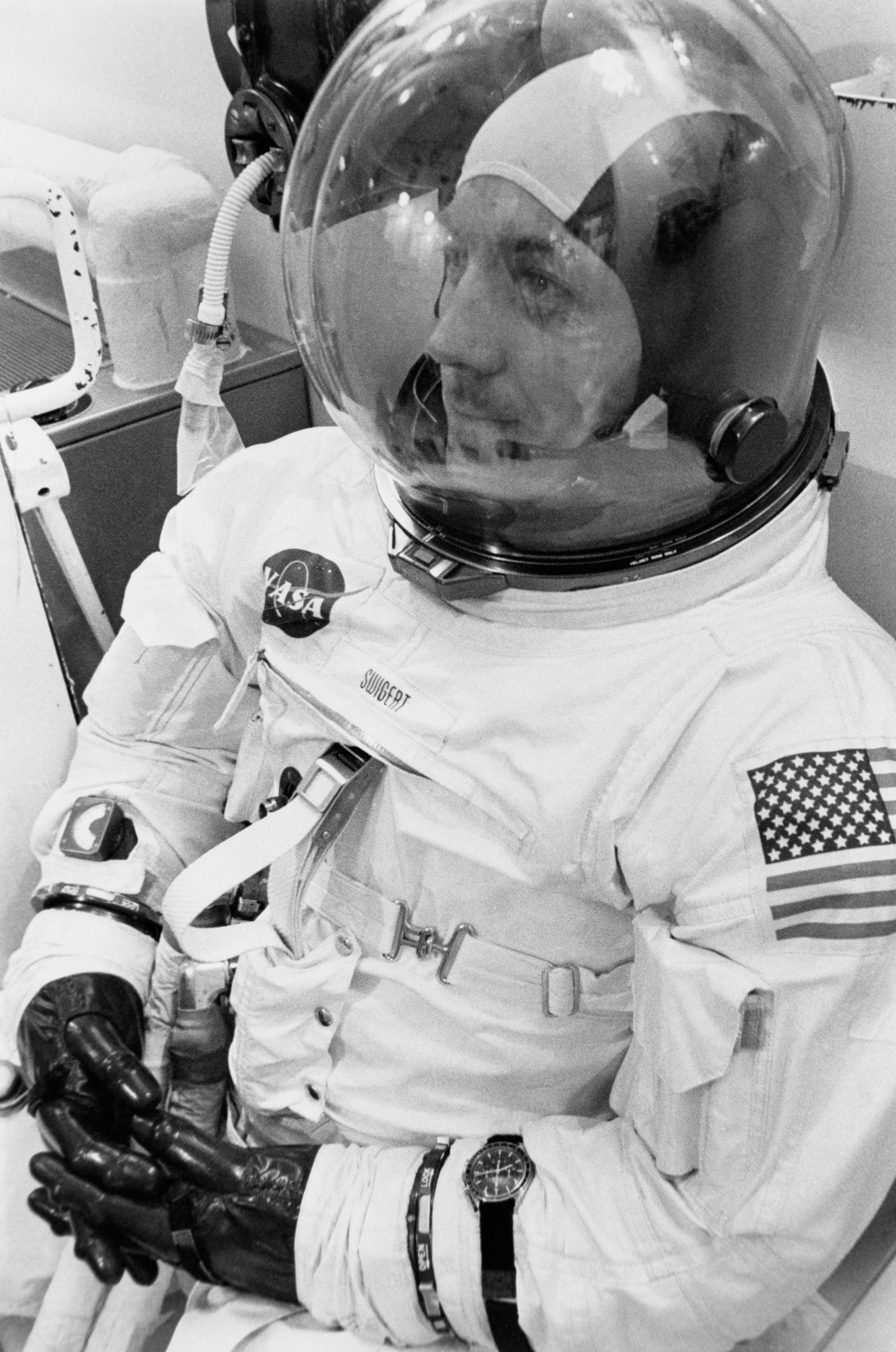
Jack Swigert with Speedmaster, prior to Apollo 13 launch (8 April 1970)

Aldrin's Speedmaster was lost during shipping when he sent it to the Smithsonian Institution, its reference number being ST105.012, although it is sometimes erroneously reported as a 145.012.

To commemorate the success of the Apollo 11 mission, then-president Richard Nixon was presented with a gold Omega Speedmaster ref. BA 145.022 as gift. These were the first ever gold Omega Speedmasters, and only 1,014 of these Omega Speedmasters were ever made. Nixon's was engraved: "RICHARD M. NIXON", "to mark man's conquest of space with time, through time, on time", and "PRESIDENT OF THE UNITED STATES". He famously refused the gift citing its high value.

In 1970, after Apollo 13 was crippled by the rupture of a service module oxygen tank, Jack Swigert's Speedmaster was used to time the critical 14-second burn using the lunar module's descent propulsion system, which allowed for the crew's safe return. In recognition of this, Omega was awarded the Snoopy Award by the Apollo 13 astronauts for "dedication, professionalism, and outstanding contributions in support of the first United States Manned Lunar Landing Project."

In 1971, Apollo 15 commander Dave Scott's Speedmaster lost its Plexiglas crystal during EVA-2. For EVA-3, the final lunar surface EVA, he wore a Bulova Chronograph (model number 88510/01 with velcro-strap part number SEB12100030-202) that was not part of the normal mission equipment and that he had agreed to evaluate for the company at the request of a friend. Because of the commercial interests involved and the revelation of the Apollo 15 postage stamp incident, NASA withheld Bulova's name for years afterward. There is also evidence that Rolex GMTs were used as personal backup watches on the Apollo 13 & 14 missions.

In addition to issued crew watches, Apollo 17 carried an additional Speedmaster to lunar orbit as part of the heat flow and convection experiment conducted by Command Module Pilot Ronald Evans. This watch was sold for $23,000 at a Heritage auction in 2009.

== Later models ==
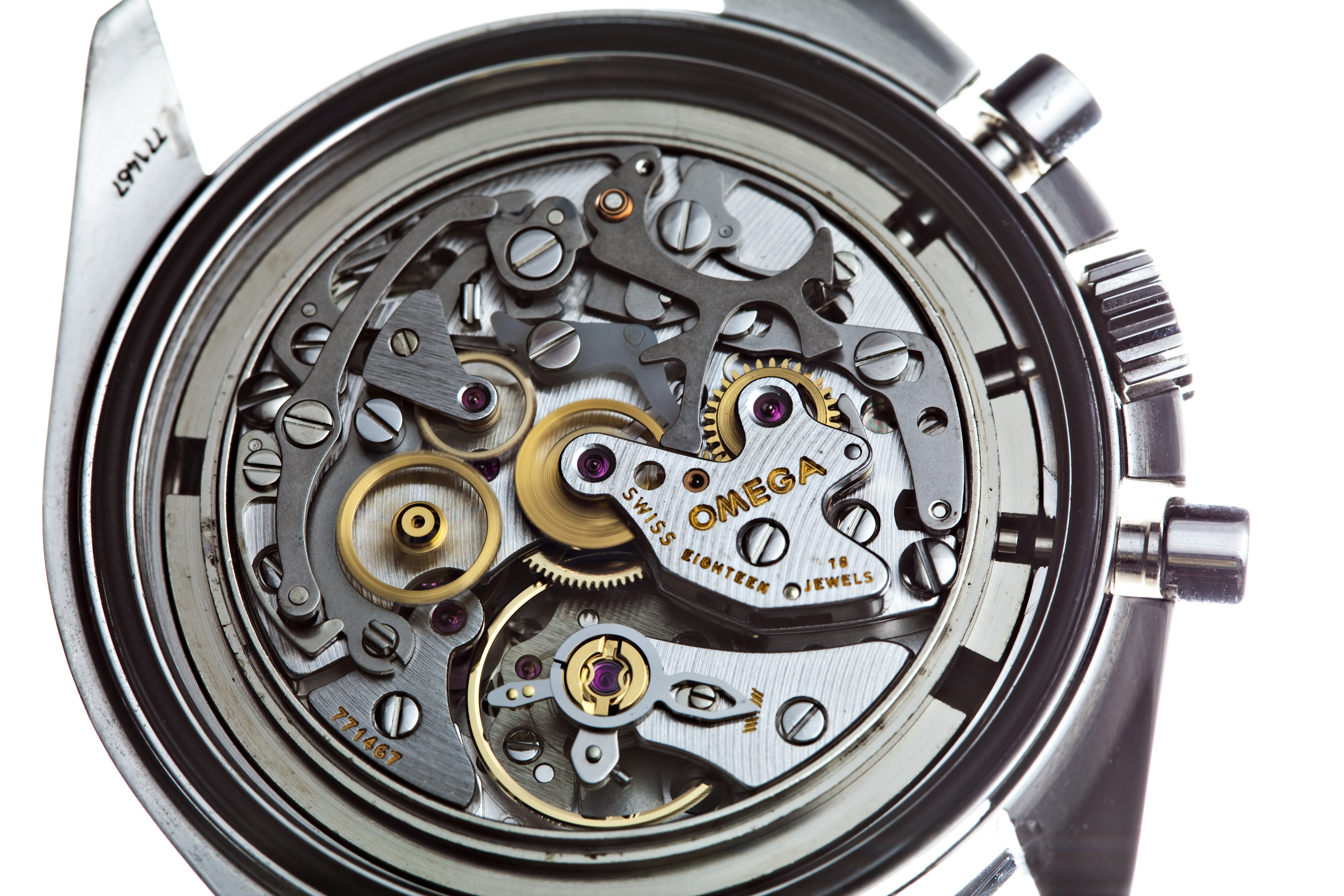
Omega cal. 1861 movement

In 1968, American insurance salesman Ralph Plaisted and three companions were the first confirmed expedition to reach the North Pole on snowmobiles. The team successfully used the same reference 145.012 Omega Speedmasters as the Apollo program along with sextants for navigation.

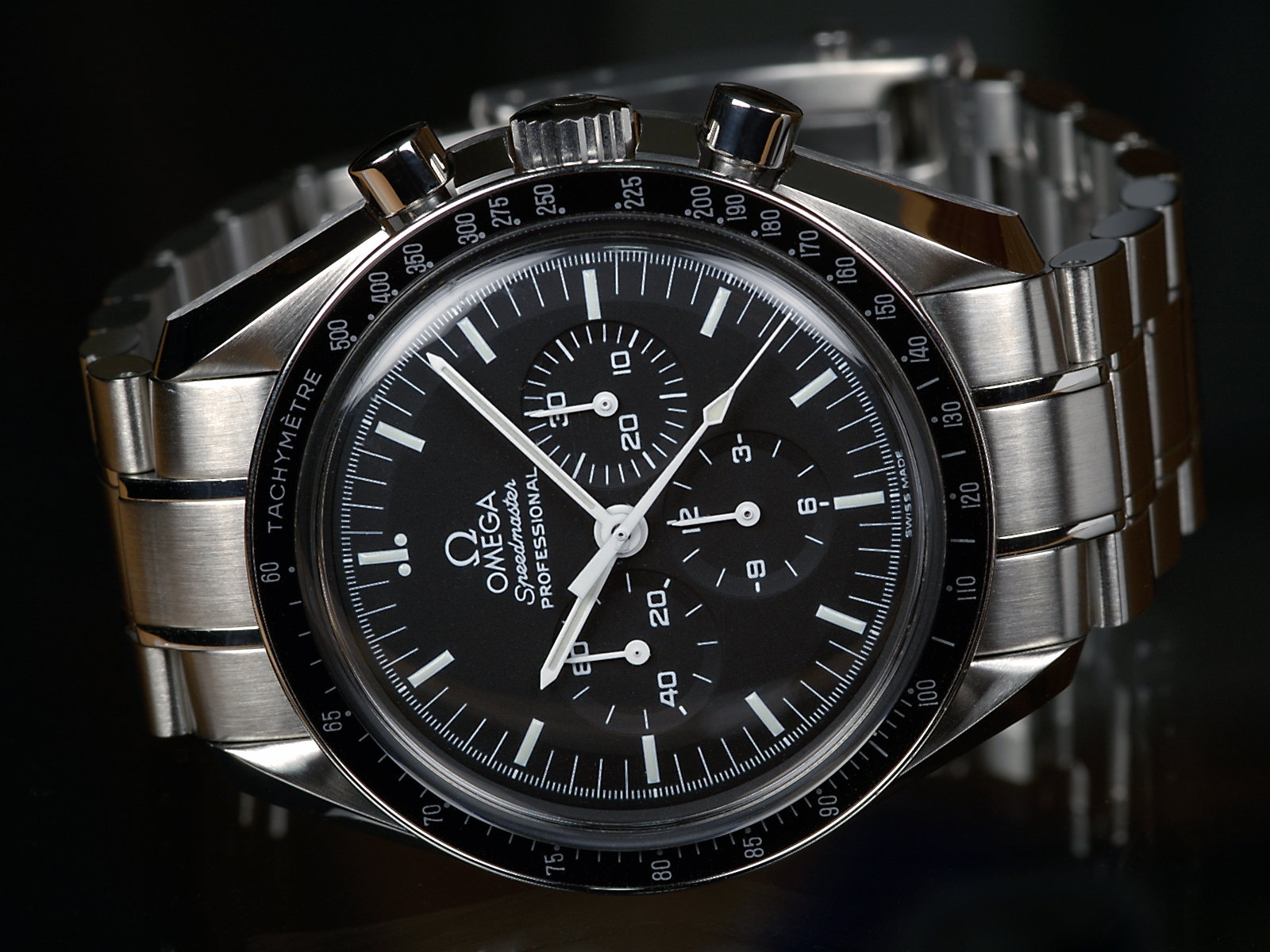

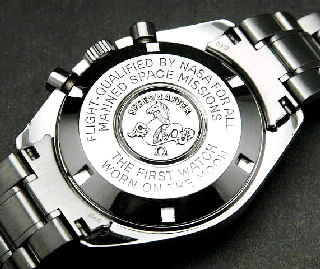
Modern Omega Speedmaster Professional ref. 3570.50.00

Also in 1968, Omega transitioned the caliber 321 movement to the new caliber 861, also designed by Albert Piguet, with the introduction of the reference 145.022 Speedmaster. The 861 was very similar to the 321, but replaced its column wheel switching mechanism with a cam and increased the beat rate from 18,000 to 21,600 vibrations per hour. Most Speedmaster Professional watches from 1968 to the present have used variants of this movement, including the modern rhodium-plated caliber 1861 and decorated exhibition calibers 863 and 1863. A standard Speedmaster Professional model with Plexiglas crystal, solid caseback with anti-vibration and anti-magnetic dust cover, tachymeter scale, without date or day complications, and powered by a caliber 861-based movement has been continuously produced since. The tritium-powered phosphorescent lume on the hands and index markers of the original watches were replaced at the end of the 1990s with non-radioactive pigments, but the fundamental design, dimensions, and mechanism of these watches have remained unchanged. In this form, the basic Speedmaster line has remained flight-qualified for NASA space missions and EVAs, after re-evaluation by NASA in 1972 and for use in the Space Shuttle program in 1978. The current such model is reference 311.30.42.30.01.005 (since 2014).

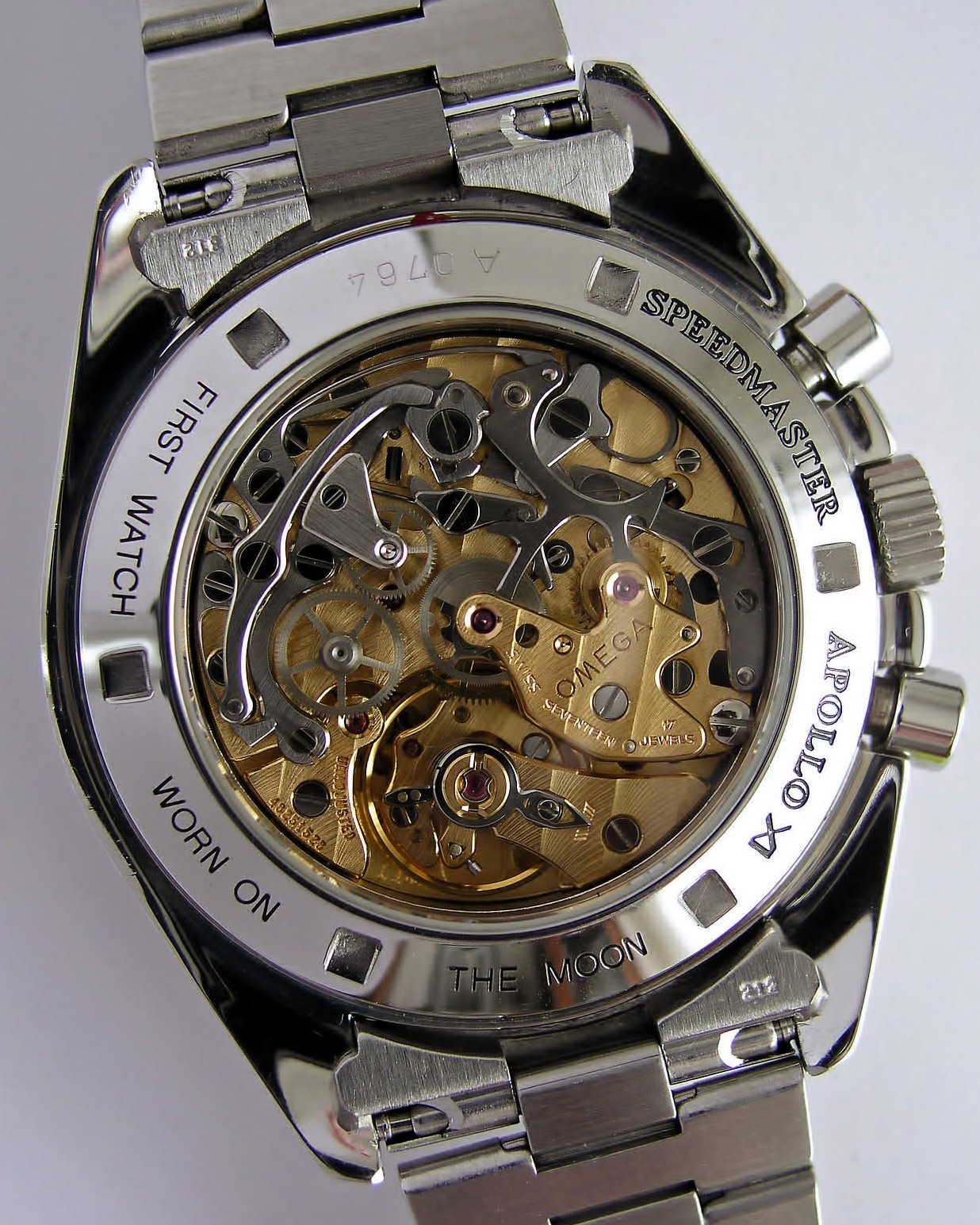
Numbered (not limited) edition Speedmaster with exhibition caseback showing a decorated chronograph cal. 864

Omega has produced a large number of commemorative and limited edition variants of the basic "Moon watch" design, celebrating important anniversaries and events, emblazoned with the different patches for the space missions it was issued for, or evoking its motor sport roots with various racing patterns. It has also released many models made with various precious metals, jewels, and alternative dial colors for the luxury market.

Over the years, Omega has also sought to improve functional aspects of the basic Speedmaster Professional. In 1969, it produced the Speedmaster Professional Mk II, with shrouded lugs and a flat, anti-reflective mineral glass crystal. In 1970, Omega launched the Alaska Project under Pierre Chopard, which changed the dial of the original Speedmaster Professional from black to white and created a removable anodized aluminum housing to shield the watch from a wider range of temperatures. In 1971 and 1973, Omega turned to automatic mechanisms on the Speedmaster Automatic MkIII and MkIV models alongside Speedsonic Electronic Chronometer Chronograph (marketing as a Speedmaster) other non-Speedmaster Chronographs such as the Omega Bullhead. However, none of these proved as popular or long-lasting as the basic Speedmaster Professional "Moon watch". A variety of other types of watches have used the Speedmaster brand, including many different automatic day and day-date models, the tuning fork movement Speedsonic line, and the digital LCD Speedmaster Quartz (the Speedsonic and LCD Speedmaster where also prototyped in ten examples each under the Alaska project but not taken up by NASA). The digital-analog Speedmaster X-33 was produced in 1998; it was qualified for space missions by NASA and flown on the Mir space station and Space Shuttle Columbia during STS-90 later that year.

In September 2019, Omega introduced a reissue of the calibre 321. The new calibre 321 was designed to replicate the same mechanism and design as the original 321. The new calibre was manufactured with modern metals and computer-aided manufacturing in a designated workshop.

Most recently, in January 2021, Omega announced it would update the standard-production Speedmaster Professional with a new movement and a subtle design refresh, including a step dial and dot-over-90 bezel. Calibre 1861 has been officially discontinued, replaced with calibre 3861, featuring a co-axial escapement and Master Chronometer certification.

== Sub-collections ==
Since 1973, when Omega introduced the Speedmaster 125, the Speedmaster name has also been used for a broader model family encompassing several distinct series alongside the original Speedmaster Professional.

=== Omega Speedmaster Automatic ===
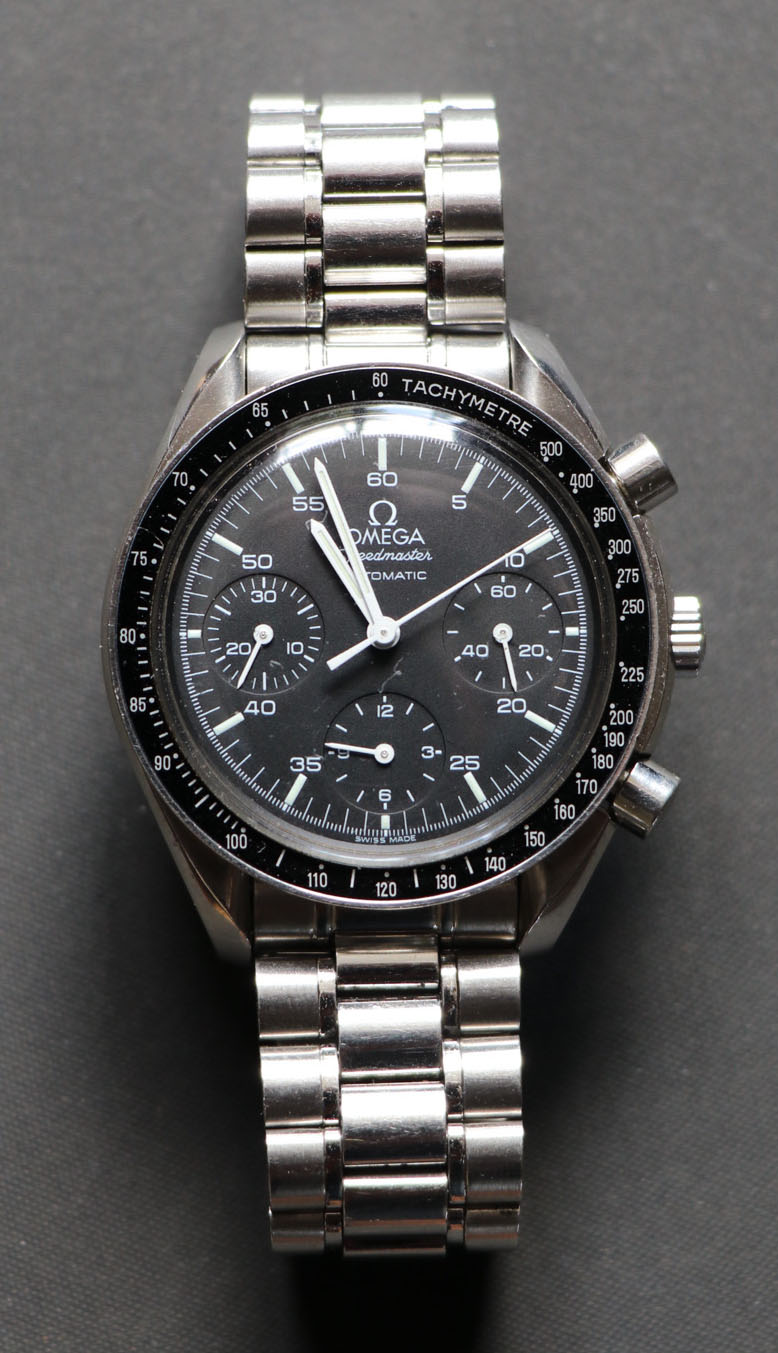
Omega Speedmaster Automatic 3510.50 Automatic Chronograph

Omega Speedmaster Automatic (informally known as the Speedmaster Reduced) is a line of chronograph wristwatches based on the Omega Speedmaster and produced by Omega SA. The Speedmaster Reduced was first introduced in 1988 as a smaller, cheaper version of the Omega Speedmaster. With a case that measures 39 mm in diameter, it is smaller than its big brother the Speedmaster Professional which has a case size of 42 mm. The Speedmaster Reduced went out of production in 2009.

Starting with a base movement of the Omega 3220, a Dubois Depraz chronograph module is mounted on top.

=== Automatic Racing models ===
The Speedmaster has also seen iterations within motor racing, in particular the automatic Racing models. Originally this differ from the Professional models having a slightly smaller 38 mm and 40 mm cases and an automatic movement, as opposed to the professionals 42 mm case and manual wound movement. Michael Schumacher was one of the brand's key representatives during the early 2000s and had his own dedicated line of the 38 mm Racing models.

The current line of Speedmaster Racing models have been increased to a larger 44.25 mm case utilizing the automatic Omega 9900 Calibre.

=== Flightmaster ===
The Flightmaster was a dedicated pilot watch manufactured between 1969 and 1972, featuring a 24-hour index and an additional hour hand to operate as a GMT. Although Russian Cosmonauts generally favoured Russian watches, they were given special dispensation to wear this model.

=== Dark Side of the Moon ===
In 2013, Omega introduced the further sub-collection, the 'Speedmaster Dark Side of the Moon' featuring a ceramic case and a zirconium oxide ceramic dial. The model was updated in 2025 with four distinct model variants, each featuring an automatic movement.

=== Flight Qualified & Pilot ===
Omega first debuted a two-counter, automatic Speedmaster, inspired by the Flightmaster as part of its Unit Watch Program in 2024, available exclusively to qualified US military pilots, referred to as the 'Flight-Qualified'. Months later, a near-identical model was made available for civilians under the name 'Pilot'.

== Notable wearers ==
- Joe Biden, 46th President of the United States
- Wally Schirra, 5th American in space; also the first astronaut to wear a Speedmaster on a space mission in 1962
- Neil Armstrong, first man on the Moon as an Apollo 11 astronaut
- Buzz Aldrin, second man on the Moon as an Apollo 11 astronaut
- Ed White, first American to walk in space as a Gemini 4 astronaut; later perished in the ill-fated Apollo 1 mission
- Tom Hanks, actor; famously wore a Speedmaster Professional while portraying Jim Lovell in Apollo 13
- Ron Howard, director
- Ralph Ellison, author of Invisible Man
- Daniel Craig, actor
- George Clooney, actor
- Steve Carell, actor
- Ryan Reynolds, actor
- Eddie Redmayne, actor
- James Corden, actor and late night talk show host
- Ed O'Neill, actor
- Dennis Quaid, actor
- Richard Hammond, presenter from Top Gear and The Grand Tour
- Adam Savage, presenter on the American TV series MythBusters
- Rory McIlroy, professional golfer
- Willem-Alexander, King of the Netherlands
- Mark Knopfler, musician
- Antoni Porowski, presenter of Queer Eye
- Jeff Bezos, Founder of Amazon

== Gallery ==
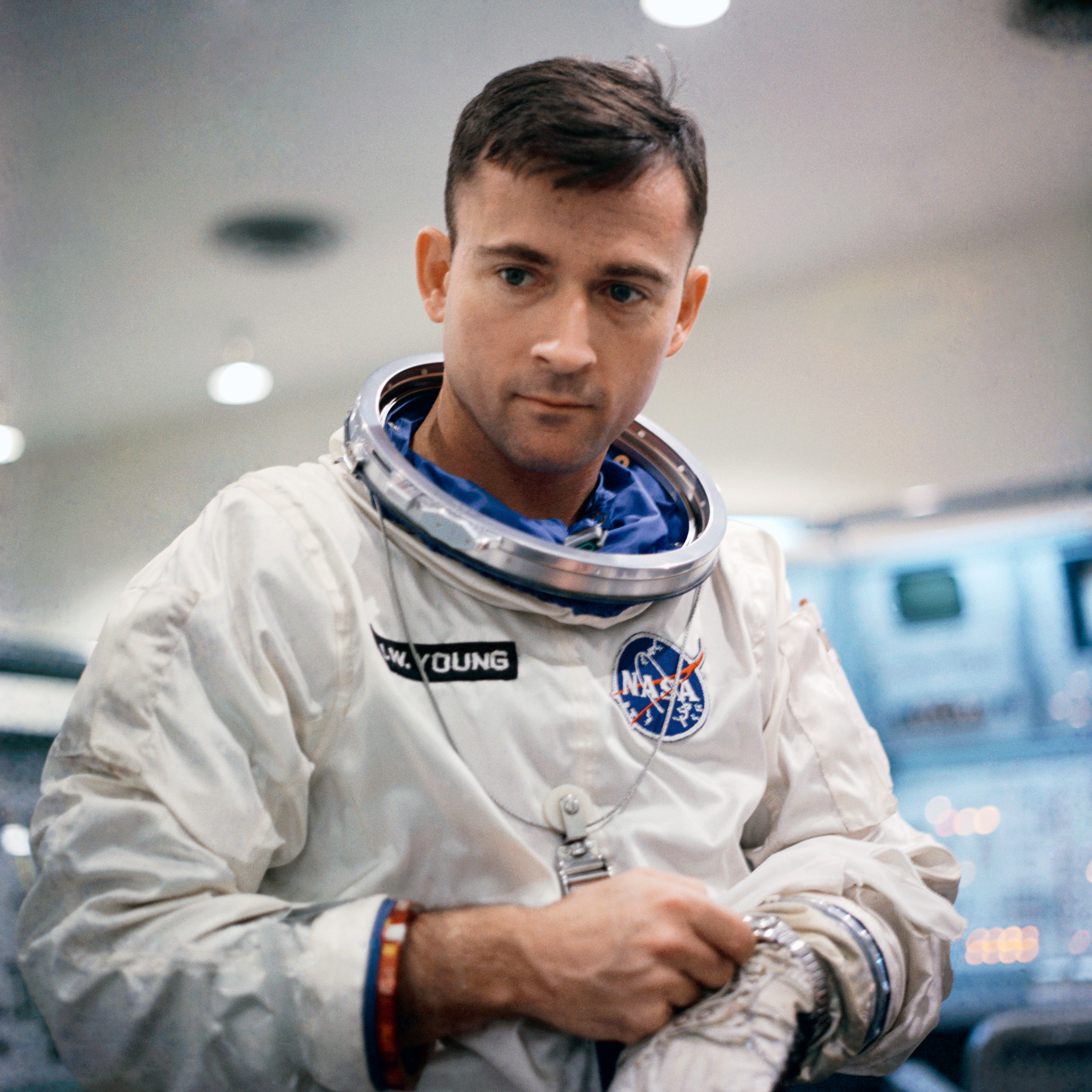
The first qualified Speedmaster was used by John Young and Gus Grissom during Gemini 3

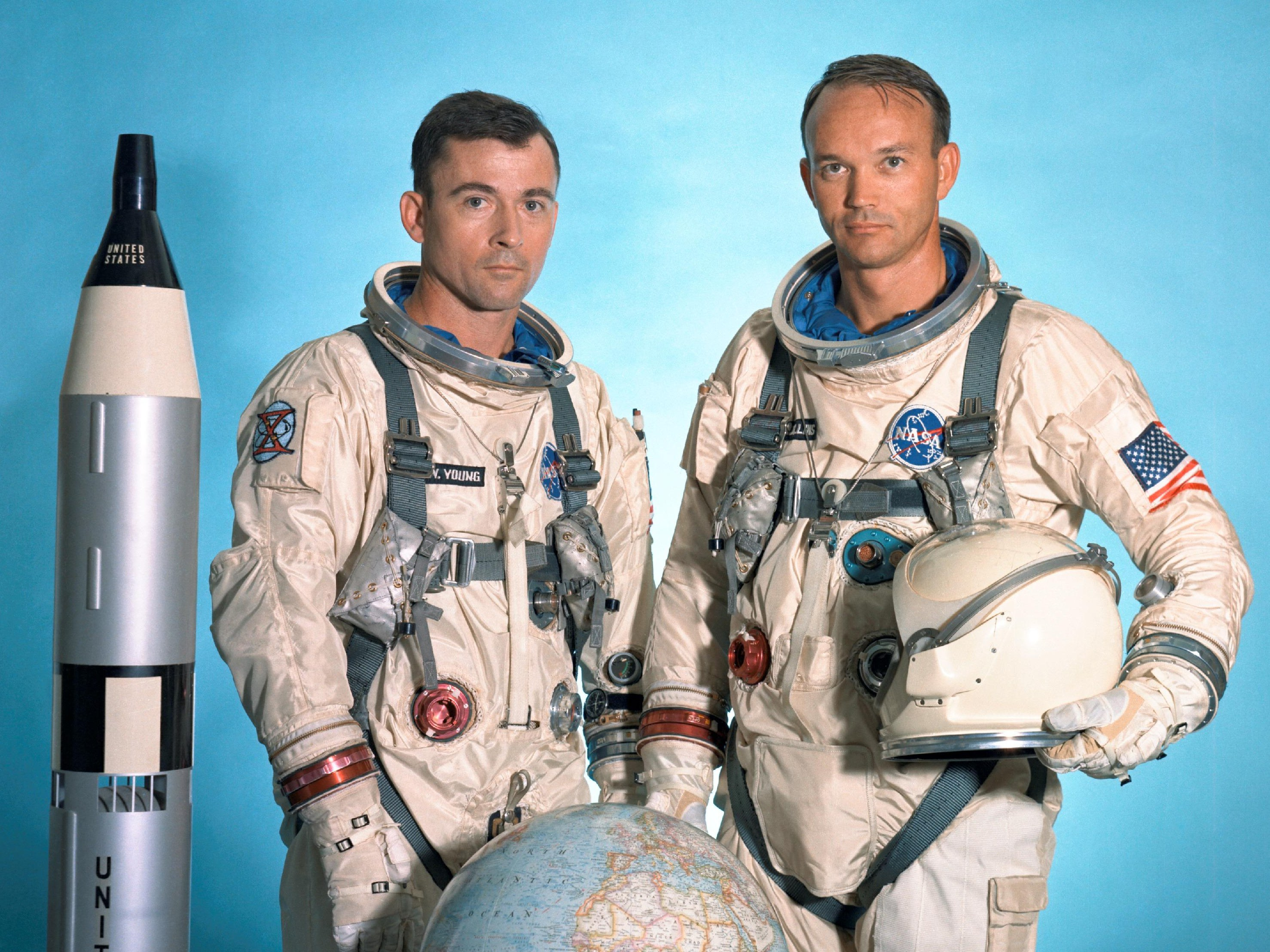
Command Pilot John Young (left) of Gemini X wearing a Speedmaster

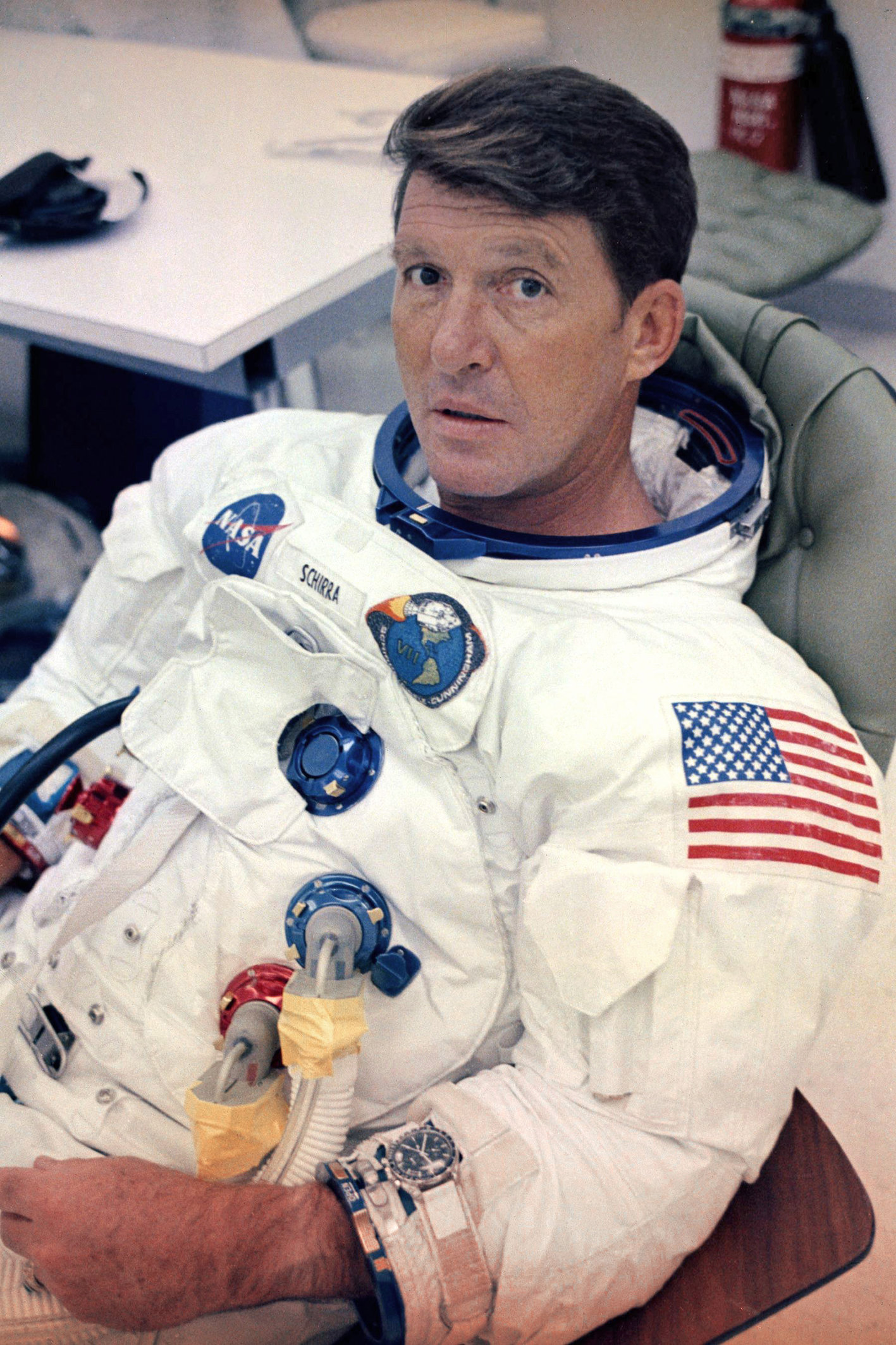
Wally Schirra wears his Speedmaster on a pre-flight watchband (Apollo 7)

Buzz Aldrin wearing an Omega Speedmaster on the Moon (Apollo 11)

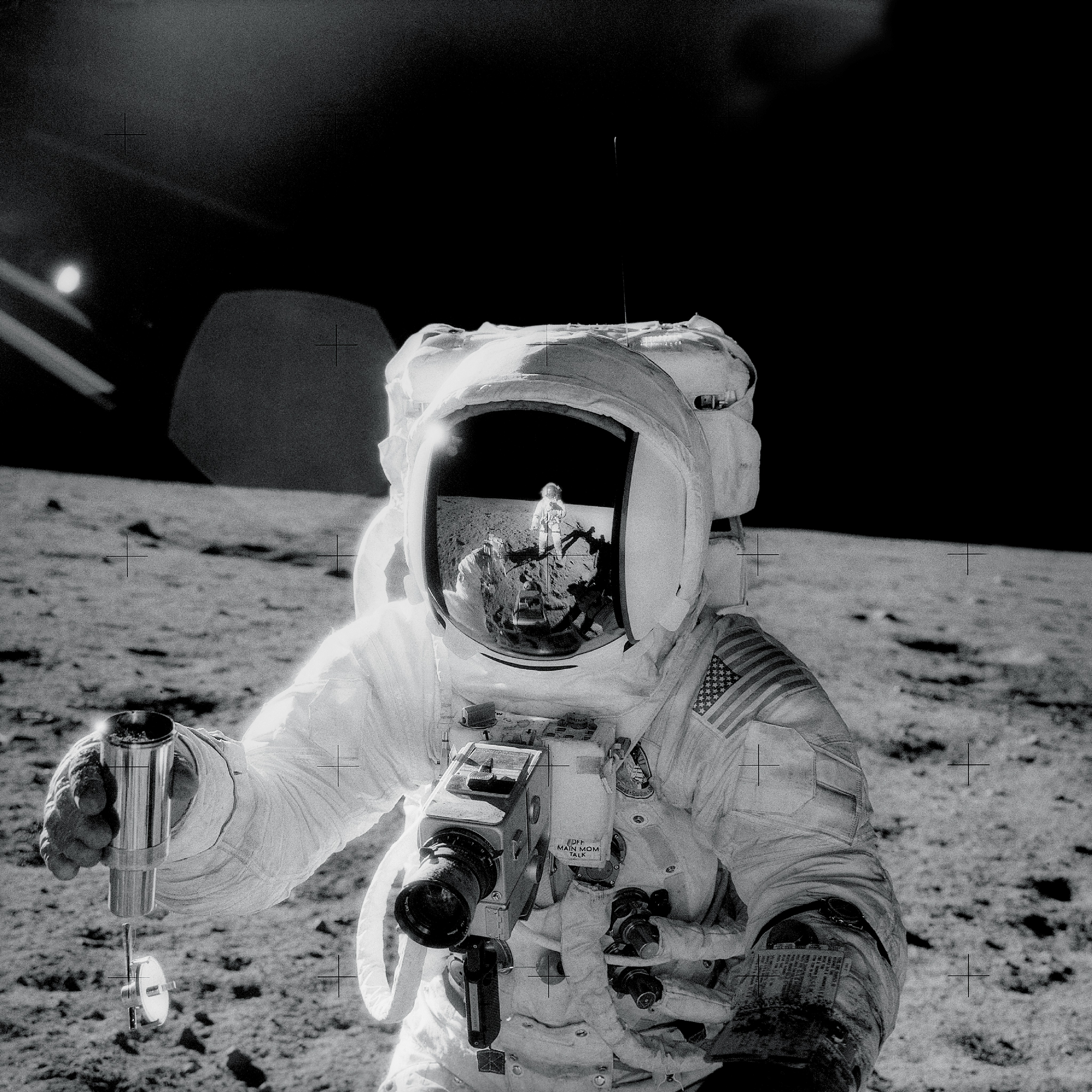
Alan Bean wearing an Omega Speedmaster (Apollo 12)

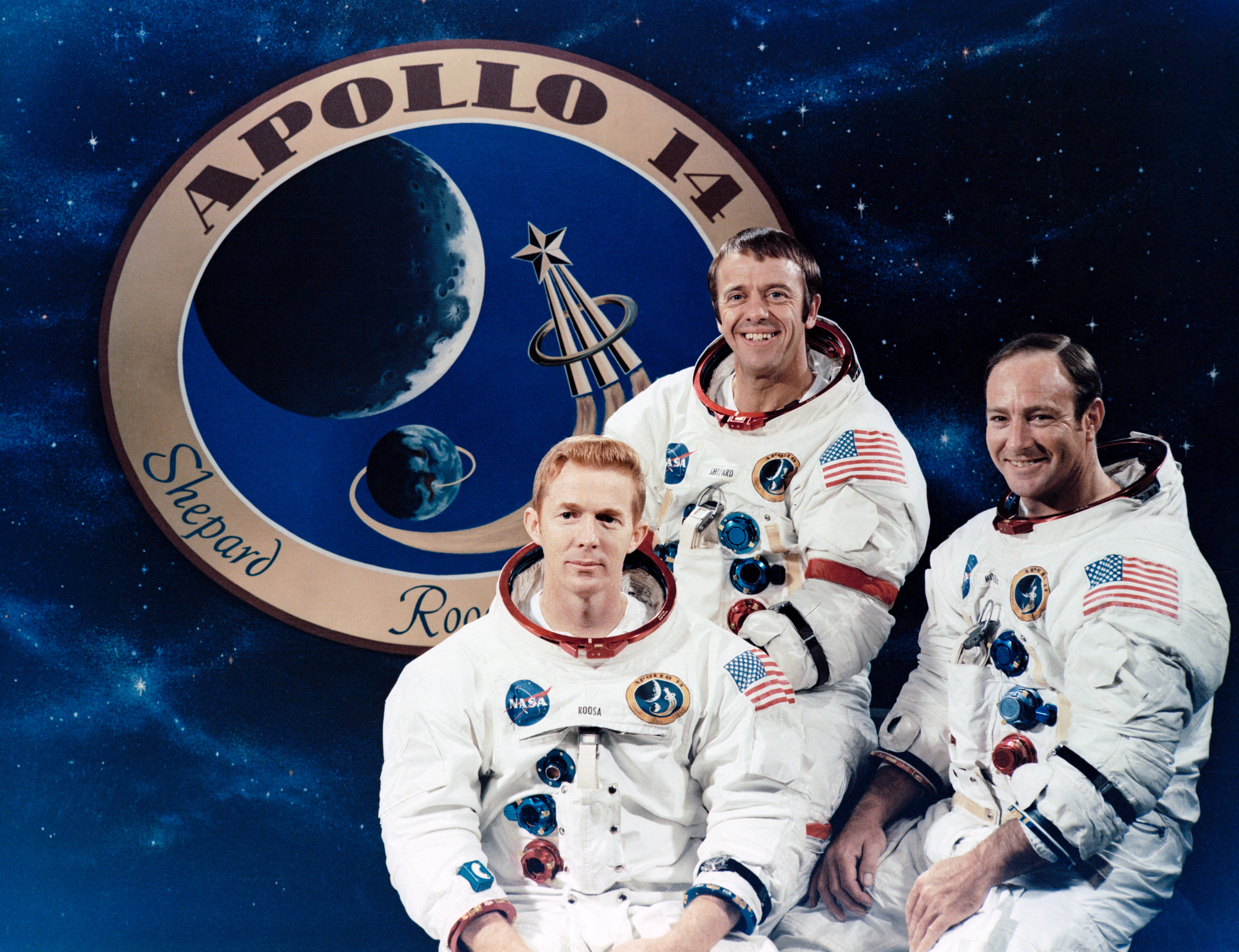
The prime crew of Apollo 14 wearing Speedmasters prior to launch

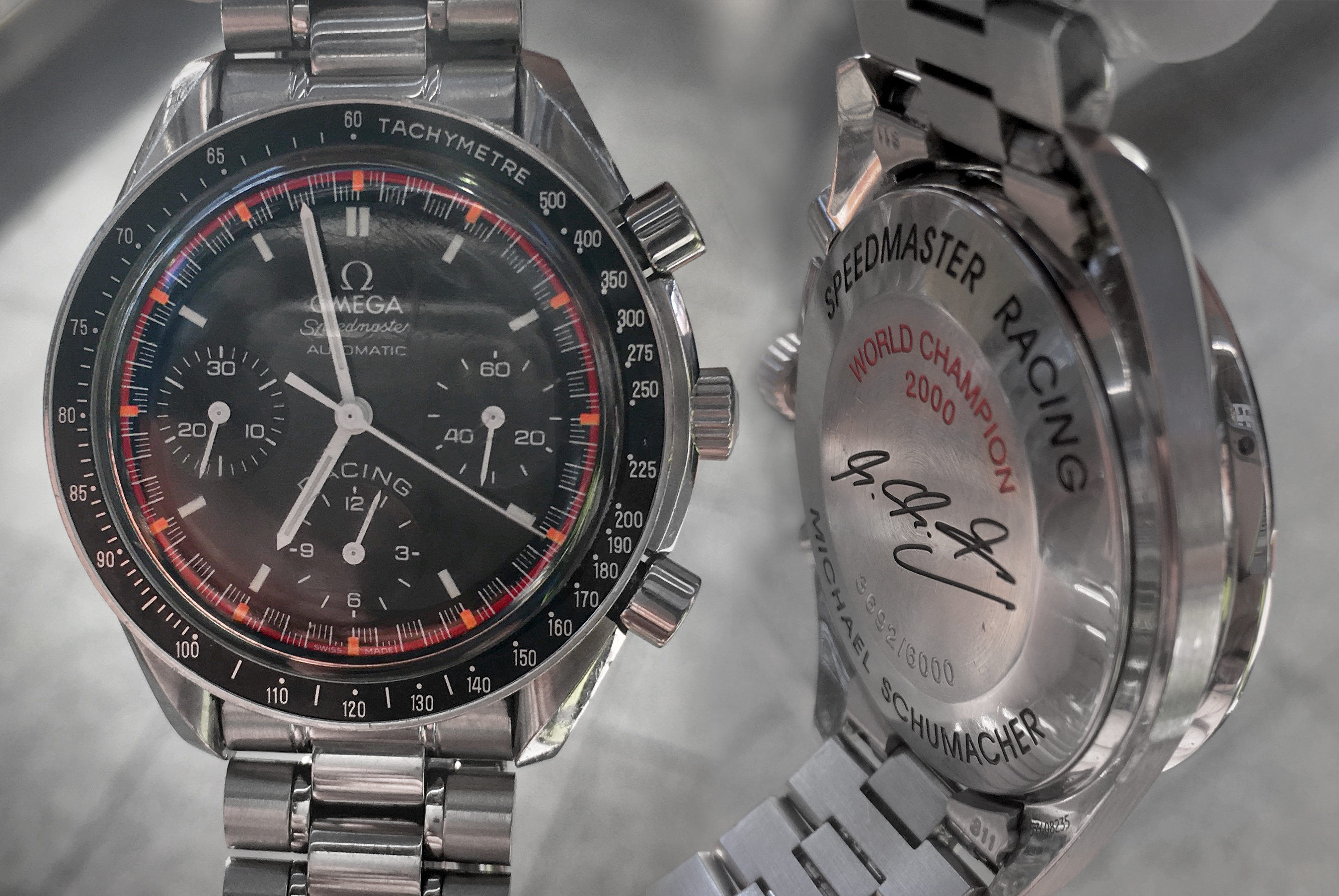
Speedmaster Racing, Michael Schumacher Edition of 2000, with his signature on the backside

== See also ==
- Pilot watch
- Science and technology in Switzerland
- Swiss Space Office
- COSC
- Dive watch
- Omega Seamaster

== Bibliography ==
- Linz, Alexander; Ragan, James H (June 2009), "How Omega Got to the Moon", Watch Time: 124–25.
- Richon, Marco (2007), A Journey Through Time, Omega, ISBN 978-2-9700562-2-5.
- Grégoire Rossier and Anthony Marquié (2014), Moonwatch Only, 60 years of Omega Speedmasters
