= Gemini 4 =

Second crewed space flight in NASA's Project Gemini

Gemini IV
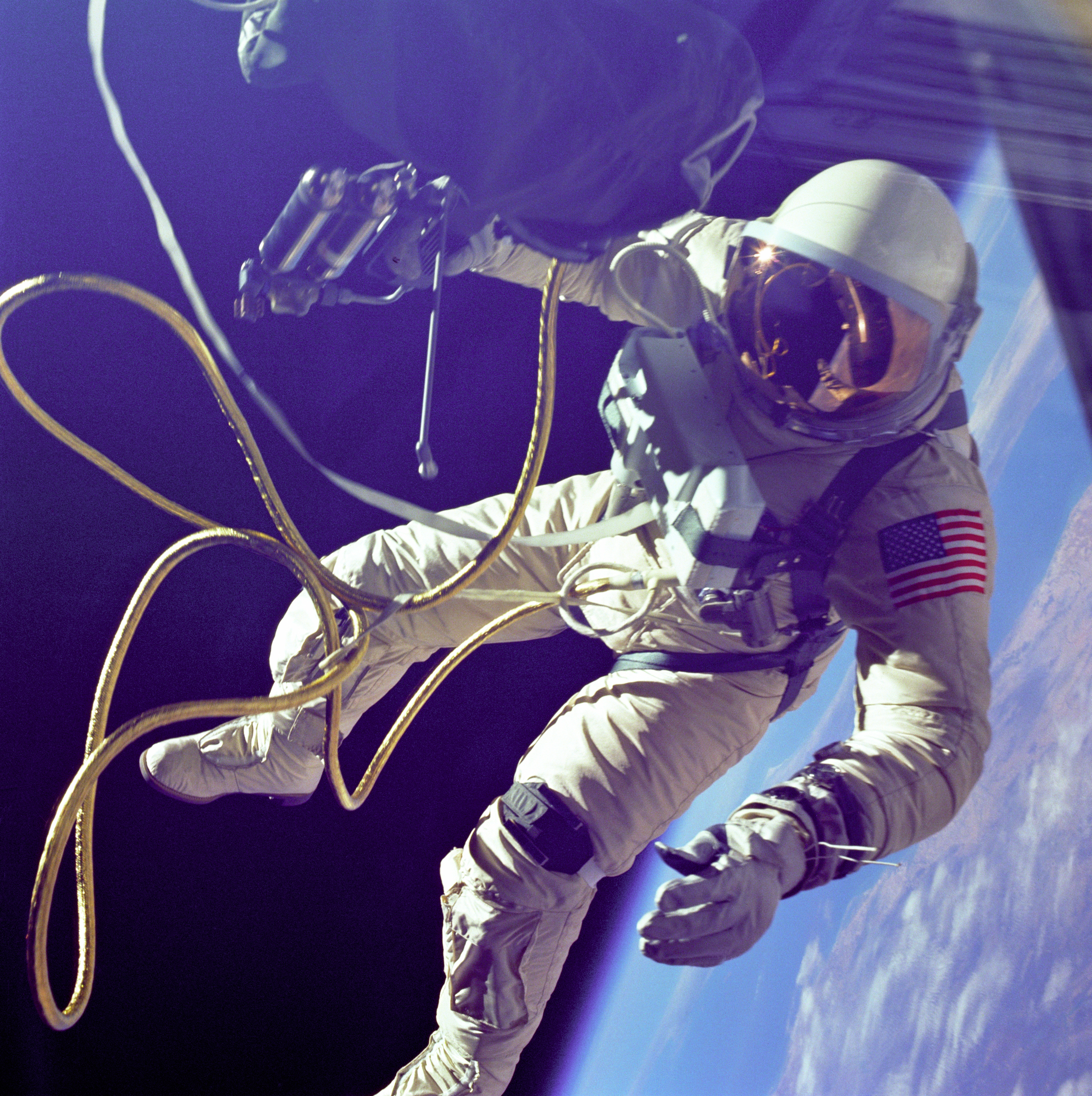
- Ed White, the first American to perform extravehicular activity, outside of Gemini IV
- Mission type: Extravehicular activity
- Operator: NASA
- COSPAR ID: 1965-043A
- SATCAT no.: 1390
- Mission duration: 4 days, 1 hour, 56 minutes, 12 seconds
- Distance travelled: 2,590,600 kilometers (1,609,700 miles; 1,398,800 nautical miles)
- Orbits completed: 66 (62 revolutions)

Spacecraft properties
- Spacecraft: Gemini SC4
- Manufacturer: McDonnell
- Launch mass: 3,570 kilograms (7,880 lb)

Crew
- Crew size: 2
- Members: James A. McDivitt; Edward H. White II
- EVAs: 1
- EVA duration: 36 minutes

Start of mission
- Launch date: June 3, 1965, 15:15:59 UTC
- Rocket: Titan II GLV, s/n 62-12559
- Launch site: Cape Kennedy LC-19

End of mission
- Recovered by: USS Wasp
- Landing date: June 7, 1965, 17:12:11 UTC
- Landing site: North Atlantic Ocean; 27°44′N 74°11′W

Orbital parameters
- Reference system: Geocentric
- Regime: Low Earth orbit
- Perigee altitude: 165 kilometers (103 mi; 89 nmi)
- Apogee altitude: 289 kilometers (180 mi; 156 nmi)
- Inclination: 32.5 degrees
- Period: 89.03 minutes
- Epoch: June 3, 1965
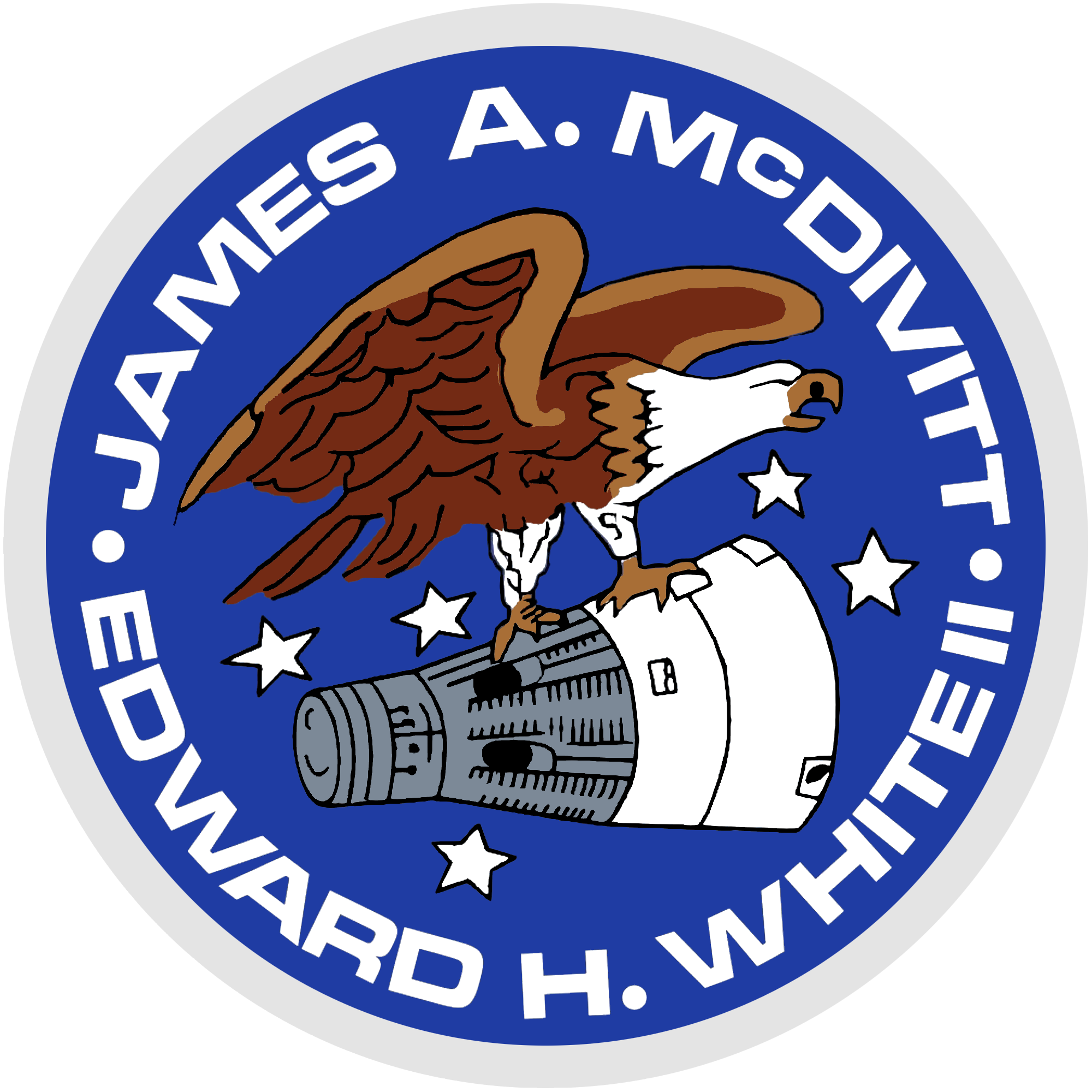
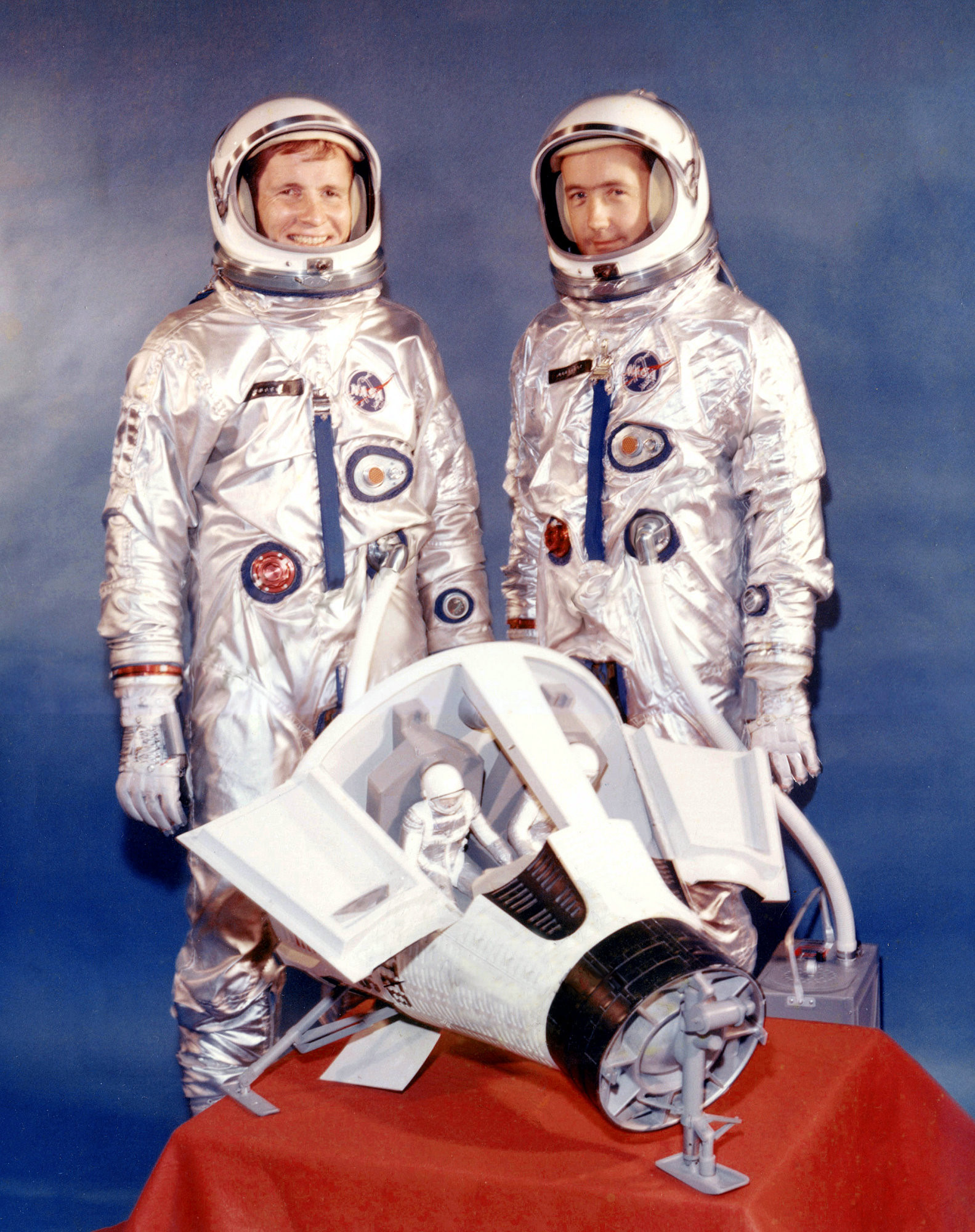
- White (left) and McDivitt (right) Project Gemini

Gemini 4 (officially Gemini IV) was the second crewed spaceflight in NASA's Project Gemini, occurring in June 1965. It was the tenth crewed American spaceflight (including two X-15 flights at altitudes exceeding 100 kilometers (62 mi; 54 nmi)). Astronauts James McDivitt and Ed White orbited the Earth 66 times in four days, making it the first US flight to approach the five-day flight of the Soviet Vostok 5. The highlight of the mission was the first space walk by an American, during which White floated free outside the spacecraft, tethered to it, for approximately 23 minutes.

The flight also included the first attempt to make a space rendezvous as McDivitt attempted to maneuver his craft close to the Titan II upper stage which launched it into orbit, but this was not successful.

The flight was the first American flight to perform many scientific experiments in space, including use of a sextant to investigate the use of celestial navigation for lunar flight in the Apollo program.

== Mission Personnel ==
=== Primary and Backup Crews ===
NASA named primary and backup crews for Gemini IV on July 28, 1964.

Prime crew
Position	Astronaut
Command Pilot	James A. McDivitt; First spaceflight
Pilot	Edward H. White II; Only spaceflight

Backup crew
Position	Astronaut
Command Pilot	Frank F. Borman II
Pilot	James A. Lovell Jr.
This became the prime crew on Gemini 7.

=== Support team ===
- Mission Director and Flight Director - Red Team: Christopher C. Kraft, Jr.
- Flight Director - Blue Team: John D. Hodge
- Flight Director - White Team: Eugene F. Kranz
- CAPCOMs: Gus Grissom, Roger B. Chaffee, and Eugene Cernan
- Worldwide support and recovery team: 10,249 U.S. Department of Defense personnel, 134 aircraft, and 26 ships.

== Mission parameters ==
- Mass: 3,570 kg (7,870 lb)
- Perigee (insertion): 165.8 km (103.0 mi; 89.5 nmi)
- Apogee (insertion): 293.7 km (182.5 mi; 158.6 nmi)
- Period: 88.94 min
- Inclination: 32.53°
- Perigee (last orbit): 150 km (93 mi; 81 nmi)
- Apogee (last orbit): 232.8 km (144.7 mi; 125.7 nmi)

=== Spacewalk ===
- Ed White - EVA - June 3, 1965
- Hatch opened: 19:34 UTC
- Start EVA: 19:39 UTC
- End EVA: 20:02 UTC
- Duration: 23 minutes
- Hatch closed: 20:22 UTC

== Objectives ==
Gemini 4 would be the first multi-day space flight by the United States, designed to show that it was possible for humans to remain in space for extended lengths of time. The four-day, 66-orbit flight would approach but not break the five-day record set by the Soviet Vostok 5 in June 1963. Subsequent Gemini flights would be longer, to prove endurance exceeding the time required to fly to the Moon and back.

A second objective was the first American extra-vehicular activity (EVA), known popularly as a "space walk". The first space walk had already been performed by Soviet Alexei Leonov on Voskhod 2 in March 1965. NASA moved up the spacewalk from the original schedule, to demonstrate that the US was gaining on the early lead taken by the Soviets in what was known as the Space Race. As late as 11 days before the scheduled June 3 launch, newspapers were reporting NASA saying that it "had not yet determined whether White would be the first American astronaut to expose himself to the elements of space" and that "A decision might not be made until a day or two before launching."

A third objective was for Gemini 4 to attempt the first space rendezvous, flying in formation with the spent second stage of its Titan II launch vehicle.

== Preparations ==
The Gemini 4 spacecraft completed major manufacturing activity, module tests, and equipment installation at McDonnell at the end of January 1965. The spacecraft was mated to the Titan II launch vehicle at Cape Canaveral Launch Complex 19 on April 23, 1965. Final system tests were performed over several additional weeks.

NASA leadership approved the Gemini 4 EVA plan on May 25, 1965; the public was informed on the same day

== Flight ==
=== Launch ===
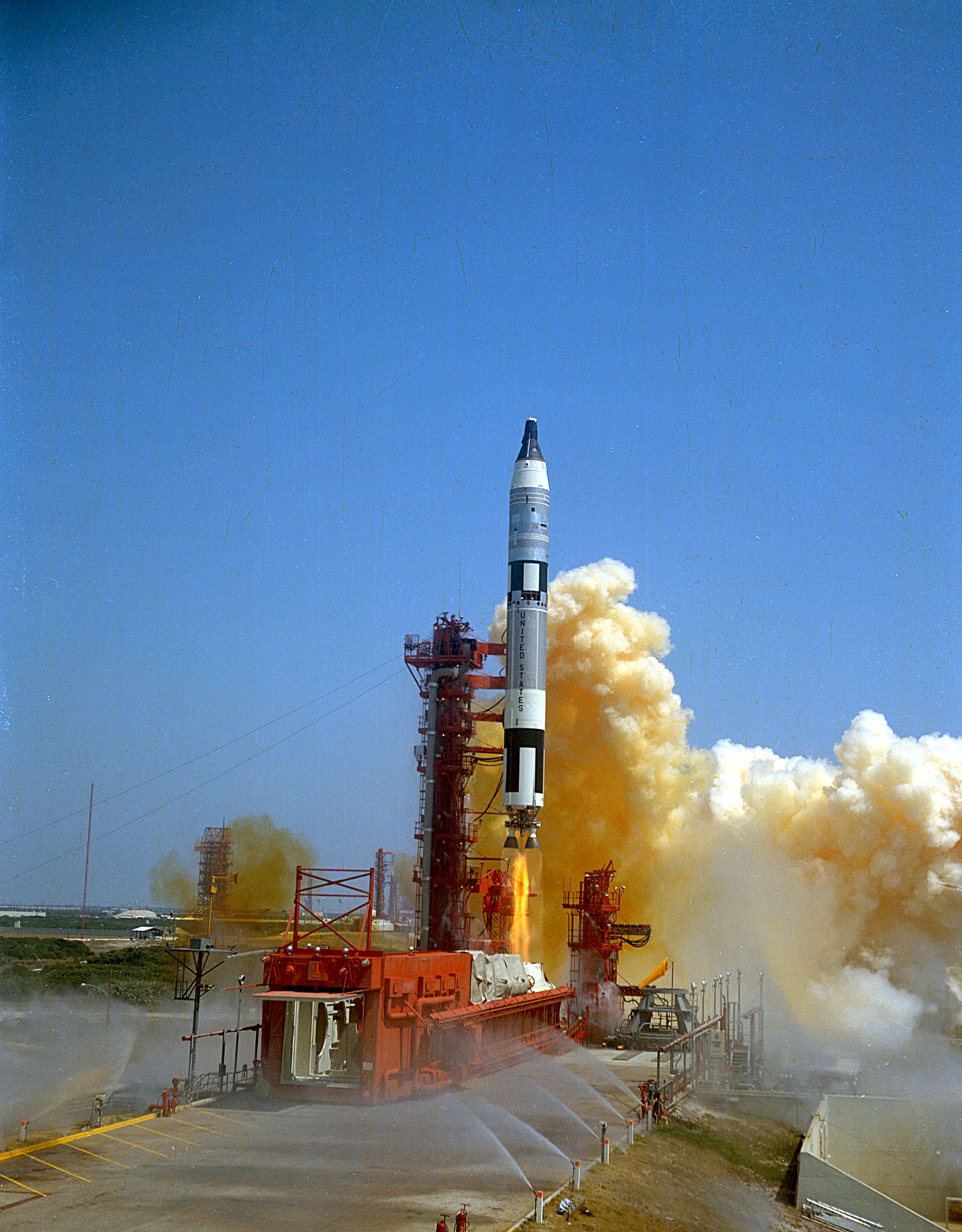
A Titan II launch vehicle lifts Gemini 4 into orbit, June 3, 1965.

Launched from LC-19 at Cape Kennedy Air Force Station, Florida, Gemini 4 was the first flight to be controlled by the new Mission Control Center at the Manned Spacecraft Center in Houston, Texas, which had to conduct three-shift operations due to the flight's long duration.

The broadcast of the launch was itself historic. For the first time an international audience, from 12 European nations, could watch the lift-off on live television via the Early Bird satellite. Press interest, due to the satellite broadcast and the new center in Houston, proved to be so high that NASA had to lease buildings to accommodate the 1,100 print and broadcast journalists who requested accreditation. Flight control shifted from Cape Kennedy to Houston as soon as the vehicle cleared the launch tower.

At liftoff, two roll transients caused by misalignment of the Titan first-stage engines occurred; these were quickly corrected by the autopilot. The fuel top-off umbilical failed to detach and was pulled loose when the booster had climbed about 27 feet (8.2 meters). A small oscillation in the pitch and yaw planes resulted from this. Performance of all launch vehicle systems was nearly nominal. Some modifications had been made to the guidance program on Gemini 4's booster to produce a less lofted flight trajectory and a lower altitude at booster engine cut-off (BECO) than on Gemini 3; these were generally successful despite a still somewhat lofted flight path. BECO occurred at T+152 seconds; second-stage engine cut-off (SECO) occurred at T+333 seconds. The spacecraft entered into an 161 by 283 km (100 by 176 mi; 87 by 153 nmi) orbit.

=== Rendezvous attempt ===
On the first orbit, McDivitt attempted to rendezvous with the spent Titan second stage. This was unsuccessful for a number of reasons:

- NASA engineers had not yet worked out the idiosyncrasies of orbital mechanics involved in rendezvous, which are counter-intuitive. Simply thrusting the spacecraft toward the target changed its orbital altitude and velocity relative to the target. When McDivitt tried this, he found himself moving away and downward, as the retrograde thrust lowered his orbit, increasing his speed.
- The stage was dumping its residual propellant, causing it to move around in various directions relative to the Gemini.
- There were only two running lights on the stage, which made it hard at times for McDivitt to determine its orientation. McDivitt concluded that a rendezvous target should have at least three lights.
- There was no radar on board Gemini 4 to give a precise range to the target, so the astronauts had to rely on their visual depth perception to estimate the range, and this differed for the two men. Initially McDivitt estimated the distance at 400–500 feet (120–150 m), while White believed that it was closer ("a little over 200 feet (61 m)"). At the worst point, McDivitt estimated it was about a half mile (800 meters) away, while White's estimate was three-quarters of a mile (1200 meters). McDivitt estimated that he was able to get as close as 200 feet (61 m), but now White's estimate was between 850 and 1,000 feet (260 and 300 m).

After expending almost half his thruster fuel, McDivitt finally gave up, in order to concentrate on the more important EVA objective. (Rendezvous was finally achieved successfully by Wally Schirra commanding Gemini 6A in December.) After the rendezvous attempt, Gemini 4's orbit was 165.2 by 287.1 km (102.7 by 178.4 mi; 89.2 by 155.0 nmi). Twenty-two hours into the mission, Mission Control estimated the orbit would decay to 150 by 232.8 km (93.2 by 144.7 mi; 81.0 by 125.7 nmi) at the end of 63 revolutions.

=== Extra-vehicular activity (EVA) ===
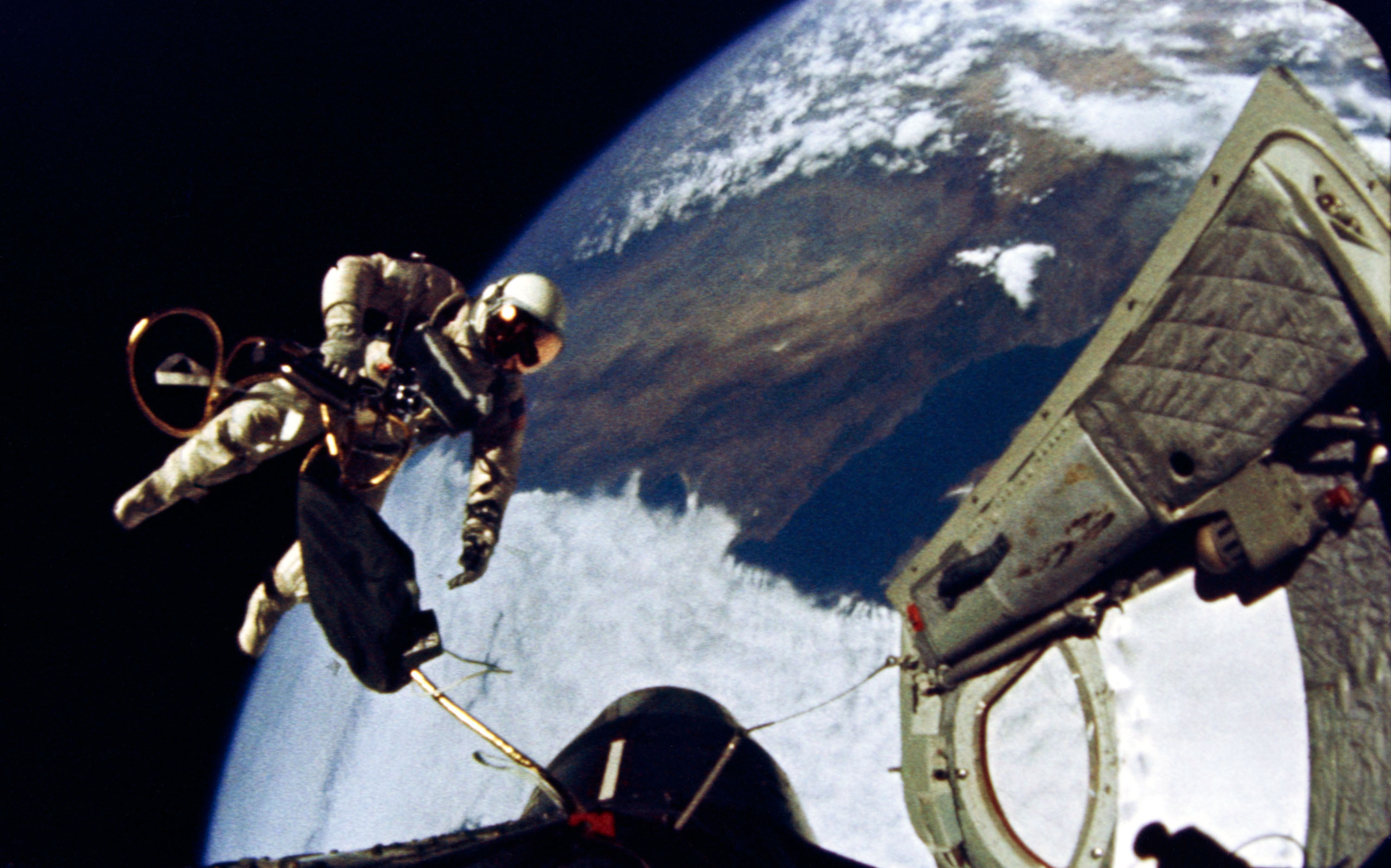
White floats away from the open hatch, towards the nose of the spacecraft at the beginning of the EVA.

Originally planned for the second revolution, the astronauts postponed the EVA until the third after McDivitt decided that White, following the stress of the launch and the failed rendezvous, looked tired and hot. After a rest, the pair finished performing the checklist for the EVA. Flying over Carnarvon, Australia, they began to depressurize the cabin. Over Hawaii, White pulled the handle to open his hatch, but the latches failed to move.

Fortunately, McDivitt knew what the problem was, because the hatch had failed to close in a vacuum chamber test on the ground, after which McDivitt worked with a technician to see what the cause was. A spring, which forced gears to engage in the mechanism, had failed to compress, and McDivitt got to see how the mechanism worked. In flight, he was able to help White get it open and thought that he could get it to latch again.

There were communication problems during the spacewalk. Gemini spacecraft were the first to use a voice-operated switch (known as VOX) on the astronaut's microphones, but McDivitt soon realized that his VOX circuit was not working properly; he could only hear the Capsule Communicator (CAPCOM) in the push-to-talk setting, but not on VOX (though both astronauts could be heard by each other and the ground). Plus, while outside the spacecraft, White was unable to receive transmissions from the ground and had to have all messages relayed through McDivitt. McDivitt must have switched to the VOX setting somewhere around the time White was exiting the spacecraft, because at that point, for most of the EVA, neither he nor White responded either to the Hawaii CAPCOM, or to the Houston CAPCOM, Gus Grissom. Grissom tried to talk to Gemini 4 a total of 40 times in 13 minutes before he got a response.

Tied to a tether, White floated out of the spacecraft, using a Hand-Held Maneuvering Unit (informally called a "zip gun") which expelled pressurized oxygen to provide thrust for controlling his travel. He went 4.6 meters (15 ft) out and began to experiment with maneuvering. He found it easy, especially the pitch and yaw, although he thought the roll would use too much gas. He maneuvered around the spacecraft while McDivitt took photographs. White enjoyed the experience, but exhausted the HHMU gas sooner than he would have liked.

White was running up against two factors which constrained the time for his EVA: loss of signal from the Bermuda tracking station and crossing the solar terminator. The flight controllers were becoming increasingly frustrated with their inability to remind White of the time constraint, because they didn't want the first EVA to be performed in darkness or out of communication with Earth. Finally McDivitt decided to take his microphone off VOX:

McDivitt, to White: I'm going out to PUSH-TO-TALK and see what the Flight Director has got to say.

Flight Director Chris Kraft, to Grissom: The flight director says, get back in! (Kraft was not on the air-to-ground loop with the astronauts.)

McDivitt: Gus, this is Jim. Got any message for us?

Grissom: Gemini 4, get back in!

McDivitt: Okay. ... (to White): ... They want you to come back in now.

White tried to use taking more pictures as an excuse to stay out longer, and McDivitt had to coax him in. He finally came back in after a total of approximately 23 minutes, almost 10 minutes later than was planned. He said: "It's the saddest moment of my life." By the time he got in, the spacecraft had entered darkness.

The hatch proved to be as stubborn to relatch as it was to open. This would have been disastrous, resulting in both men's deaths on reentry. McDivitt was able to fix the mechanism once again, so White could close it, about 20 minutes after he got in. The mission plan called for opening the hatch again to throw out White's now-unnecessary EVA equipment, but McDivitt elected not to do this, instead keeping the unnecessary equipment on board for the rest of the flight.

They powered down the spacecraft's maneuvering system, intending to drift for the next two-and-a-half days to conserve the remaining fuel. They also intended to sleep alternate four-hour periods, but this turned out to be extremely difficult with the constant radio communications and the small cabin, about the size of the front seats of a compact car.

White's 20-minute space walk was the mission's highlight, with McDivitt's photographs being published worldwide. These also showed White wearing an Omega Speedmaster chronograph watch on his spacesuit sleeve, one of two makes which had been approved by NASA for space use following extensive tests. Omega were unaware of these tests or the fact that its product was going to be used in space, until the photos. The model worn during the spacewalk is now known as the "Ed White" by watch collectors.

=== Experiments ===
Eleven experiments were carried on the spacecraft:

- Experiment D-8 used five dosimeters to measure the radiation in the spacecraft environment. Of particular interest was the South Atlantic Anomaly.
- Experiment D-9 was an experiment in simple spacecraft navigation where the crew used a sextant to measure their position using the stars. The objective was to investigate the feasibility of using this technique for lunar flights on the Apollo program.
- Experiments S-5 and S-6 were both photography experiments where they used a 70-millimeter Hasselblad camera to photograph the weather and terrain below them.
- There were two medical experiments: M-3 and M-4. The first was a bungee cord that the crew used for exercise. They said, after the mission, that this got harder as the mission went on, though this may have been due to a lack of sleep. The second was the phonocardiogram experiment, which had sensors attached to their bodies that measured heartbeat rates, especially during liftoff, EVA, and reentry.

There were four engineering experiments:

- MSC-1 measured the electrostatic charge in the spacecraft.
- MSC-2 was a proton-electron spectrometer.
- MSC-3 was a tri-axis magnetometer.
- MSC-10 involved the crew photographing the red-blue Earth limb.

Photographs were taken over the Middle East and the southwestern United States; several air fields indicated on charts were identified.

The crew had 16 freeze-dried meals and ate all but one of them. As they lacked any means of measuring water intake, they attempted to minimize consumption of it and also reported high amounts of gas bubbles in the water from the water dispenser. They experienced a degree of eye, nose, and throat irritation early in the flight and post-landing. This was attributed to ammonia fumes from the flame retardant used in the cabin, which was changed to a different material on subsequent flights.

=== Reentry ===
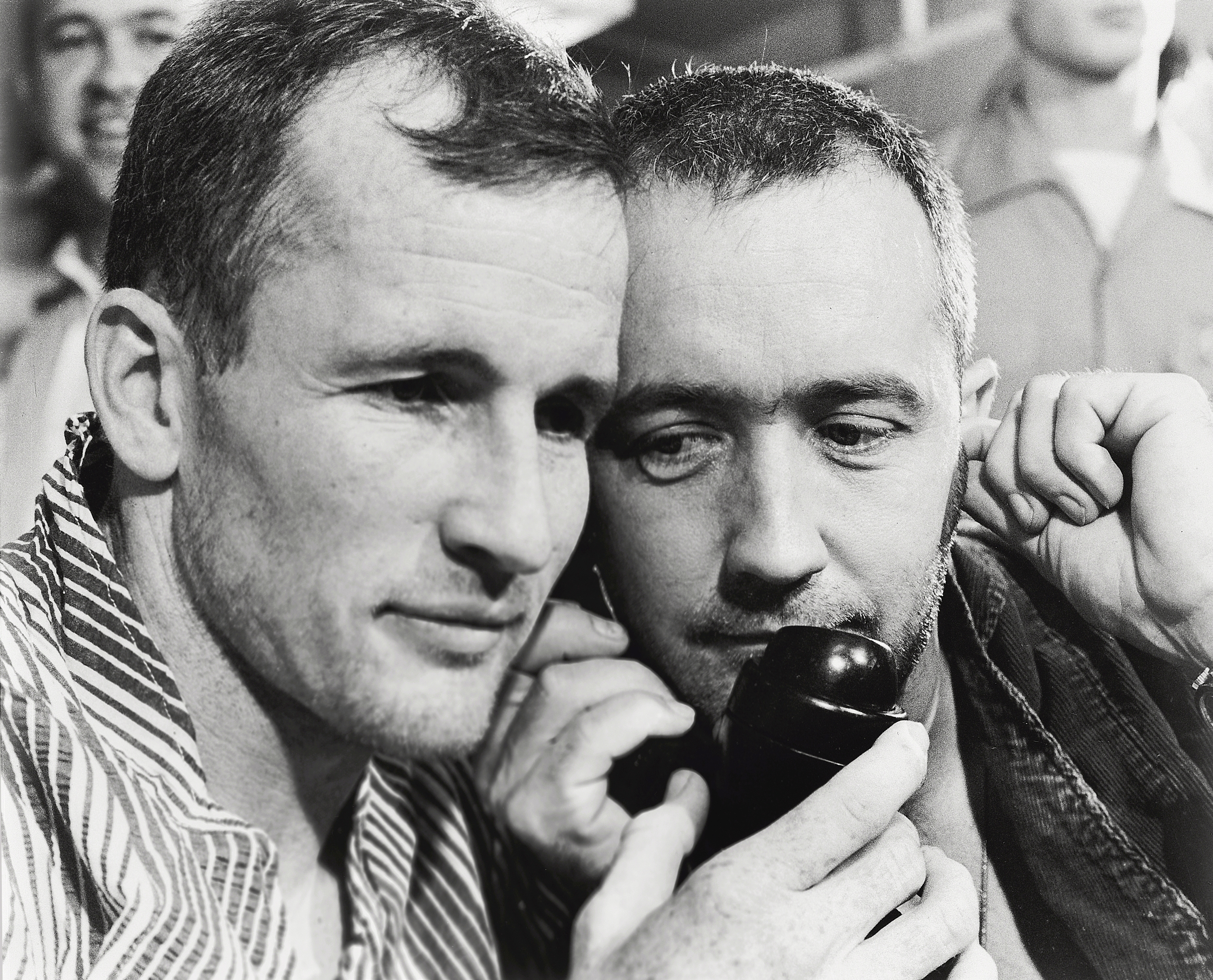
White (l) and McDivitt being congratulated by President Lyndon B. Johnson by telephone aboard the aircraft carrier USS Wasp

The computer failed on the 48th revolution when McDivitt tried to update it for reentry. It would not turn off and eventually stopped working altogether. This was unfortunate for IBM, which had just put an advertisement suggesting that its computers were so reliable that even NASA used them. The computer failure meant that the capsule would not be able to perform a closed-loop lifting reentry as planned. IBM were unable to duplicate the failure on the ground but they installed a manual override switch on subsequent Gemini missions. It was the only Gemini mission to experience a computer failure.

Reentry came on the 62nd revolution. An open-loop rolling reentry (as used in Mercury) had to be used because of the computer failure. The astronauts began rolling the spacecraft at 120 kilometers (75 mi; 65 nmi) altitude to increase its stability. They started slowing the roll rate at 27,000 meters (89,000 ft) and stopped it by 12,000 meters (39,000 ft). The drogue parachute deployed shortly after this, and the main deployed at 3,200 meters (10,600 ft). A malfunctioning thruster caused the roll to be much faster than planned, and the landing was rough. Despite the rough landing, neither of the crew encountered any problems, contrary to NASA doctors' concerns about their landing upright – as opposed to on their backs, as in Mercury – after four days in space. Even though they landed 80 km (50 mi; 43 nmi) short of the intended landing target, some ships had already started steaming to the touchdown point, and a helicopter was able to see them land. The prime recovery ship was USS Wasp. The recovery was supported by 10,249 U.S. Department of Defense personnel, 134 aircraft, and 26 ships.

Postflight medical examination found the astronauts to be in good health, and no significant physiological changes were found.

== Insignia ==
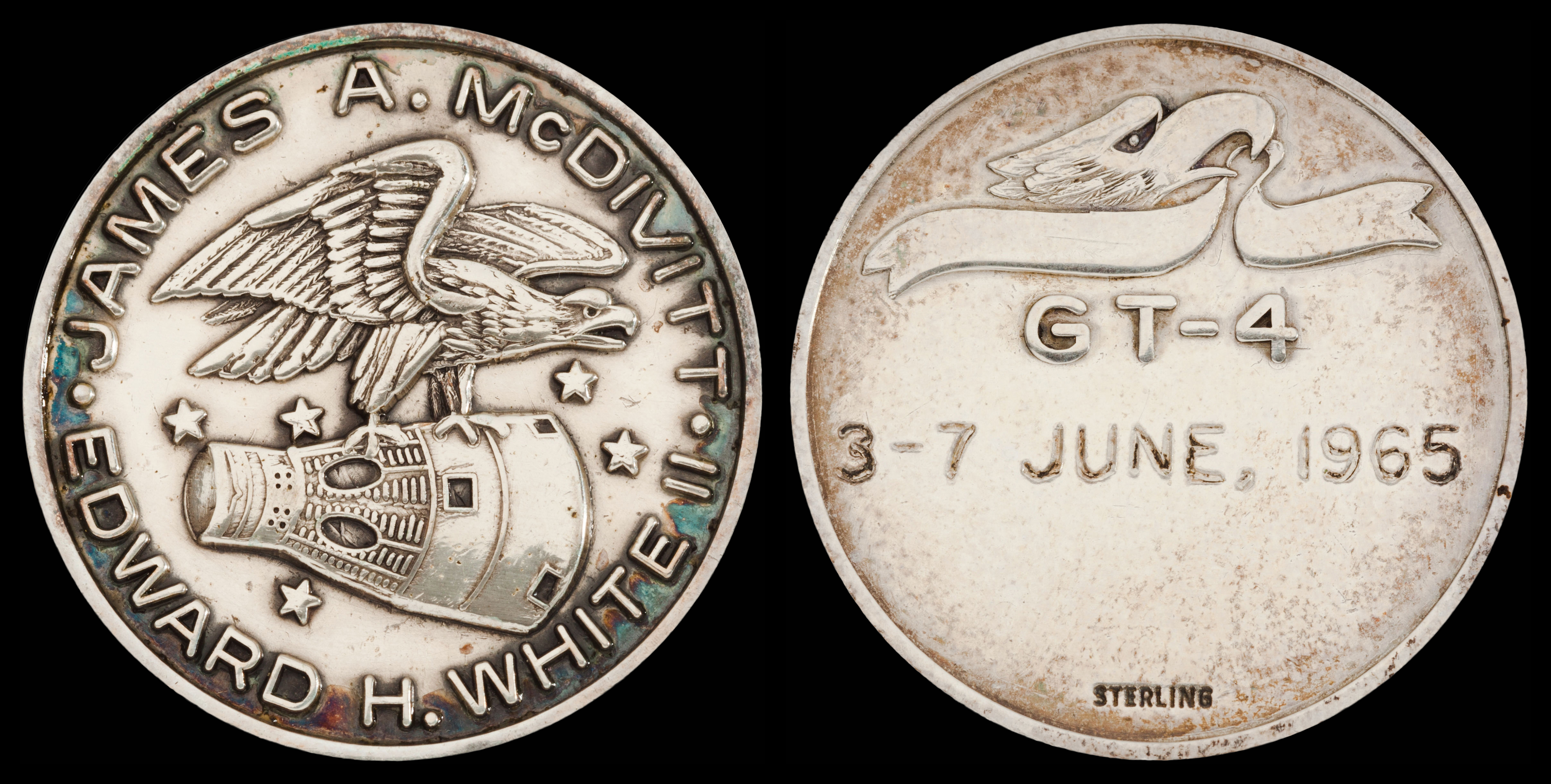
Gemini 4 space-flown Fliteline Medallion

Gemini 4's crew originally intended to call their spacecraft American Eagle, but this was rejected after NASA management issued a memo saying that they did not want a repeat performance of the previous mission, on which Gus Grissom had named his spacecraft Molly Brown.

The callsign for the mission became simply Gemini 4. There was no patch flown on the crew's suits, although the one shown here was created after the mission and is on display in McDivitt's museum. Since McDivitt and White were prohibited from naming their spacecraft, they decided to put the American flag on their suits, the first astronauts to do so, although Soviet crews wore the Cyrillic "СССР" on their spacesuit helmets. Previous astronauts had only had the NASA insignia and a strip with their name on their suits.

== Post-flight ==
The Gemini 4 capsule on display at the National Air and Space Museum

=== Spacecraft location ===
The spacecraft is on display at the Steven F. Udvar-Hazy Center, Chantilly, Virginia

=== Postage stamp ===
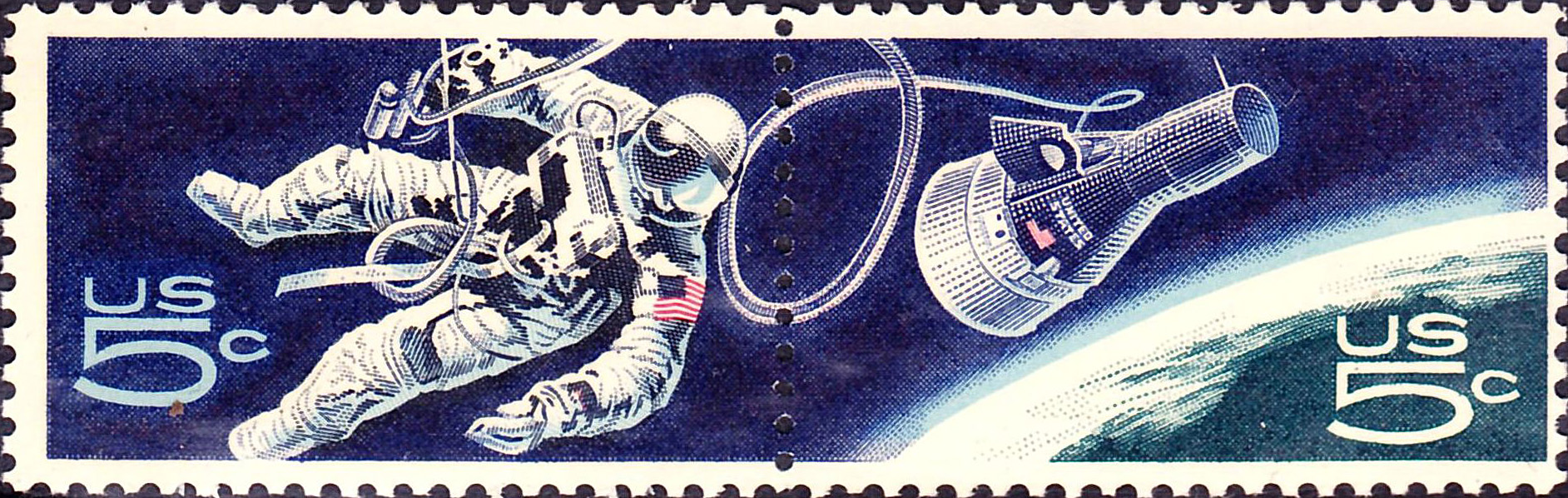
Accomplishments in Space Commemorative Issue of 1967

The flight was commemorated on a pair of US postage stamps in 1967.

== See also ==
- Extra-vehicular activity
- List of spacewalks
- Splashdown

== Bibliography ==
- Collins, Michael (2009). Carrying the Fire: An Astronaut's Journeys. Lindbergh, Charles (foreword). Cooper Square Press. ISBN 9780374531942.
