= Omega 28.9 chronograph =

The Omega 28.9 Chronograph was Omega's first small wrist chronograph. Introduced in 1932 as the Lemania caliber CH13, production continued until 1943. Lemania was acquired by the same mother company as Omega, SSIH, in 1932. Watches based on this movement paved the way for Omega to become one of the most successful manufacturers of Swiss made wrist chronographs.

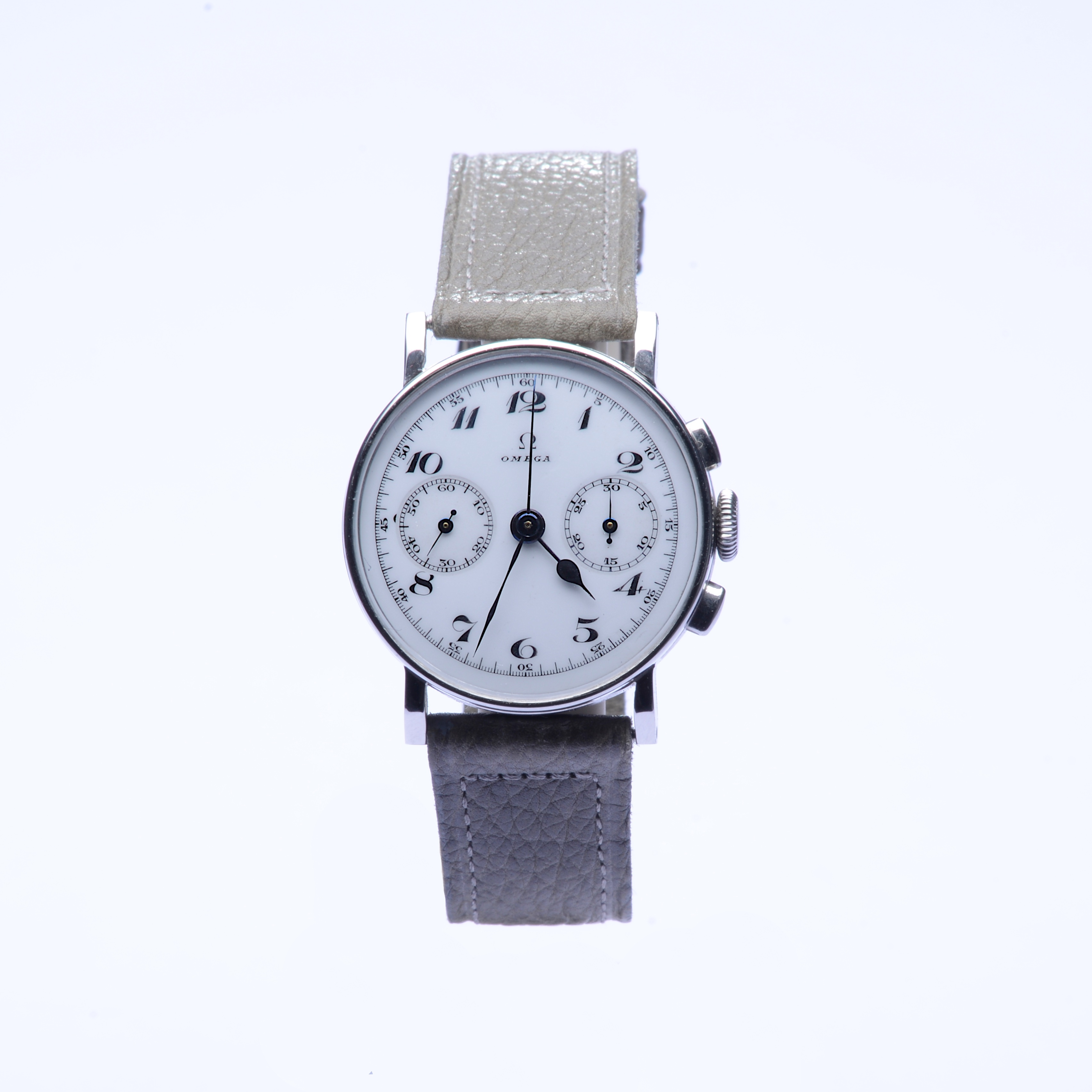
Omega 28.9 T3

== Introduction ==
The calibre 28.9 was introduced as Omega SA watches' first production wrist chronograph in 1932 featuring 17 rubies, Breguet balance and continuous minute hand. Lemania produced the movements for Omega and it was made in very small numbers for a little over ten years. Lemania produced three types of the calibre CH13/28.9 movement: T1, which utilized a single pusher, and T2 and T3, which utilized two pushers. The movement was manual wind.

== Early development ==
The movement was developed following the success of the Omega calibre 18’’’ wrist watch, which was a development of the Calibre 19”’ pocket chronographs.

The most famous owner of an Omega calibre 18” wrist chronograph was T.E. Lawrence otherwise known as Laurence of Arabia.

The calibre 28.9 was designed primarily as small wrist chronograph to be worn for sports or by professionals and was marketed primarily at sportsmen and pilots. The watch was introduced in production form in 1932 and was produced in very small numbers up until circa 1943.

This watch marked the introduction of the Omega wrist chronograph in production form, which would later evolve through the calibre 33.3 (Lemania 15CH) to the calibre 321 (Lemania 2310), fitted to the famous Omega ‘moon watch’ used even today by NASA.

== Production watches ==
Numerous manufacturers utilized the calibre 13CH movement, including Tissot. The movement was most successfully adopted by Omega who under calibre 28.9 manufactured three variants, T1, T2 and T3 in numerous configurations in both stainless steel and precious metals, most notably 18ct solid gold.

Stainless steel examples of this watch were used by the commanders and pilots of the Italo Balbo air force who used them on trans-Atlantic crossings. Other famous owners included Amelia Earhart who was wearing a calibre 28.9 T1 enamel dial when she disappeared during a transpacific crossing.

The watch was produced with a number of variations of chronograph dial, some in enamel and some in painted brass, including some very rare prototypes such as the inserted drivers chronograph dating from circa 1937.

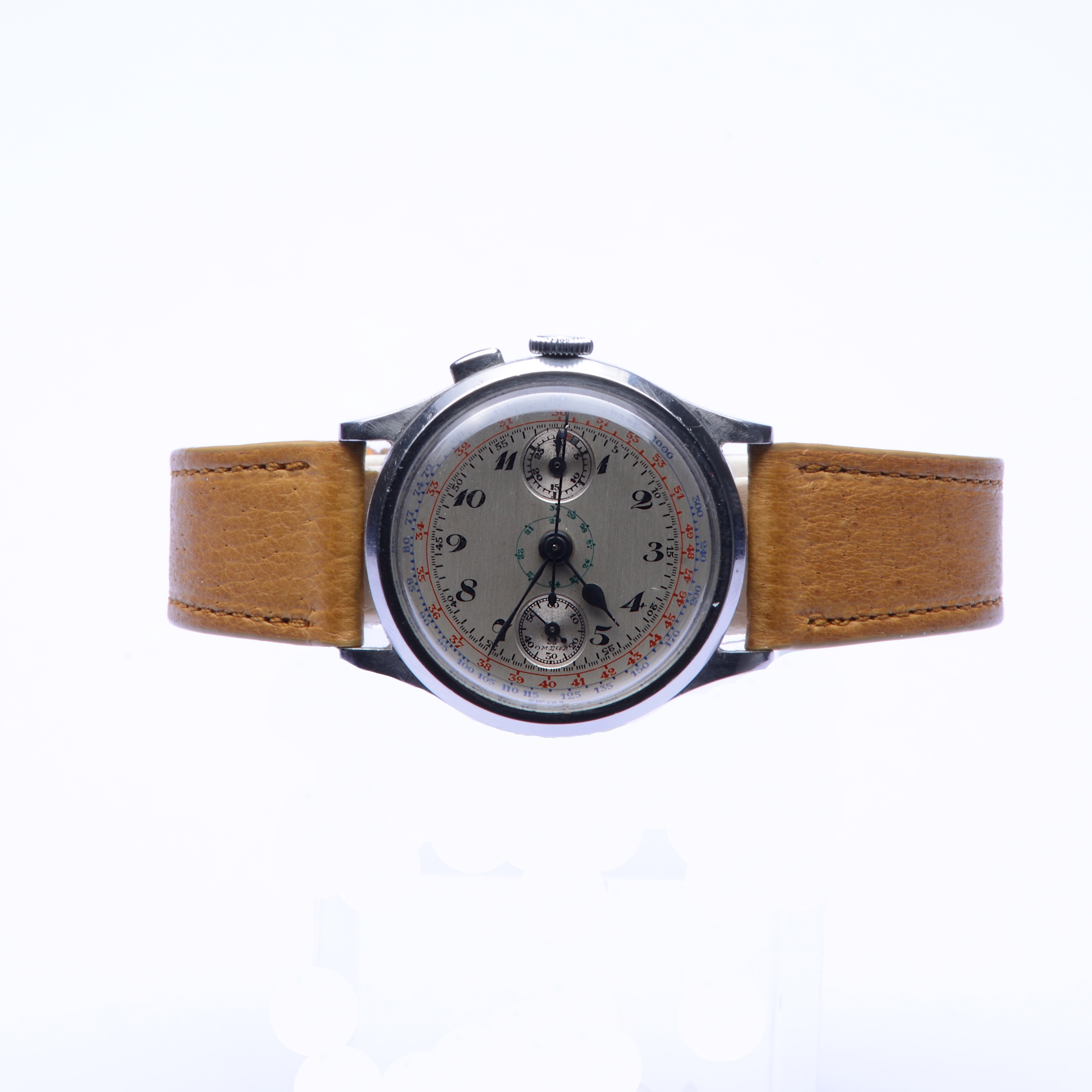
Omega 28.9 T1

The watches were small by modern standards and reliability issues resulted in Omega introducing watches based on the Lemania calibre 15CH (Omega 33.3) in 1933 at which point the 28.9 was slowly phased out of the range and had been discontinued by 1943.

== Further developments ==
The Omega 28.9 chronograph paved the way for the introduction of the calibre 33.3 a more accurate and larger wrist chronograph, this in turn evolved into the calibre 27 CHRO and later the calibre 321 and then 861. The calibre 321 and 861 are undoubtedly Omega's most famous chronograph watches and have been incorporated into a range of wrist chronographs including being the only watch certified for EVA use by NASA and still issued to this day to their astronauts.

== Summary ==
Despite the significance of the calibre 28.9 wrist chronograph it was produced in relatively small numbers over the eleven-year period. Technological developments and the introduction of the larger calibre 33.3 movement, which was larger and more reliable, resulted in the demise of the calibre 28.9. Nonetheless it marked the first production wrist chronograph manufactured by Omega and paved the way for the company to become one of the most successful manufacturers of chronographs watches in the world.

Calibre 28.9 chronographs are now extremely rare and as such highly sought after by collectors and enthusiasts.
