= Omega Marine Chronometer =

1974 quartz wristwatch

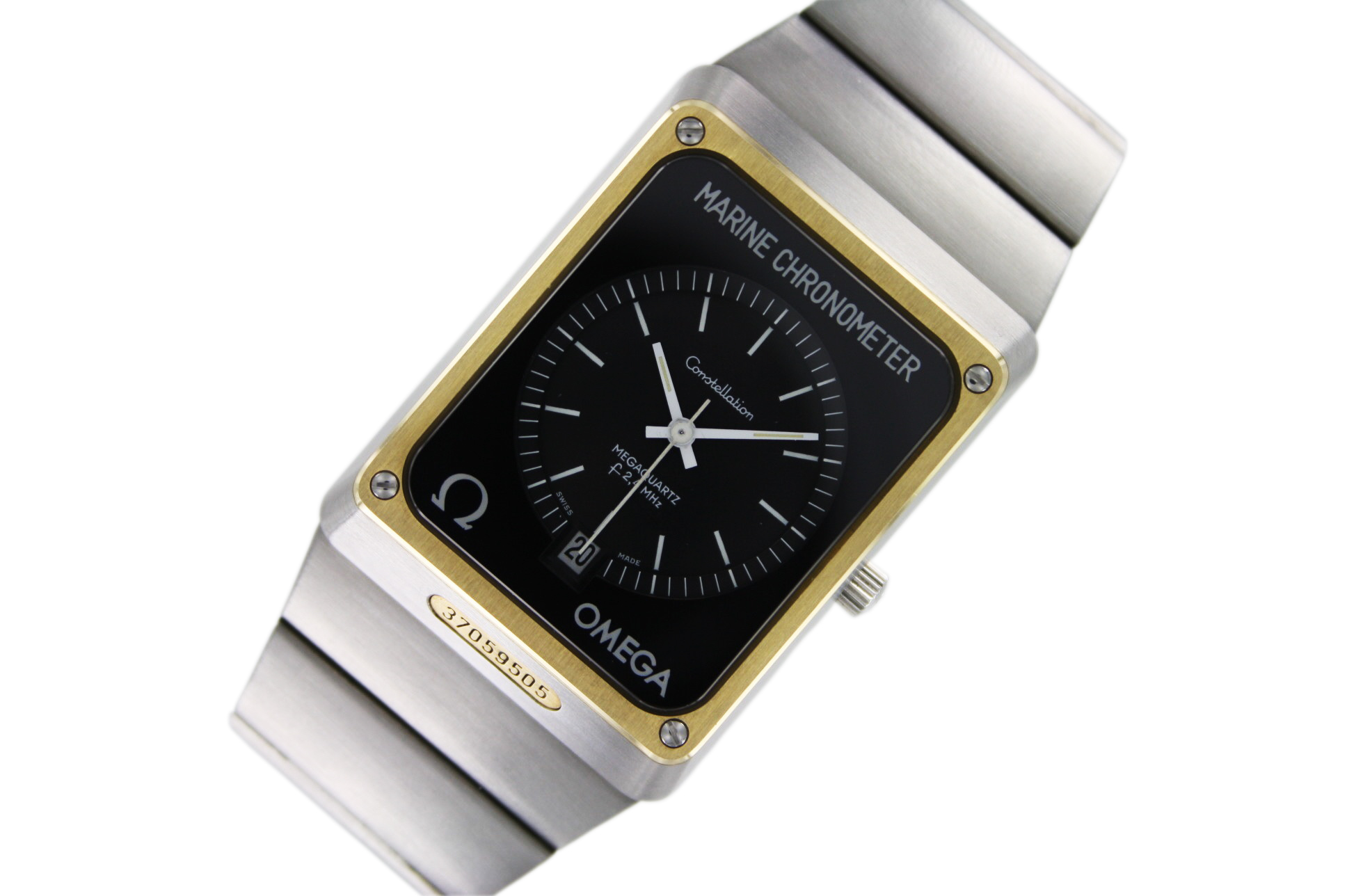
OMC calibre 1516

The Omega Marine Chronometer was the first quartz wristwatch ever to be awarded certified status as a marine chronometer. The watch was made by Omega SA and developed by John Othenin-Girard and is one of the most accurate non thermo-compensated production watches ever made, keeping time to within 1 second per month

== Introduction ==
The watch was introduced to the market in 1974 under calibre 1511, having an unrivalled accuracy of 12 seconds per year thanks to the revolutionary 2.4 MHz quartz circuit. In 1976 the calibre 1516 Marine Chronometer was introduced with smaller case dimensions and altered movement, although performance remained the same, sales began in 1974 and the watch remained in Omega's line up until 1978.

Famous owners of Omega Marine Chronometers have included Jacques Cousteau and Eric Tabarly.

== Early development ==
The first prototypes of the ‘1500 family’ quartz watch (which later developed into the Marine Chronometer) were presented at the Basel Fair in 1970 as calibre 1500, developed by Omega and the Battelle Geneva Research Institute. Known as the ‘Elephant’, there are rumored to have been only five examples of this watch made by Omega.

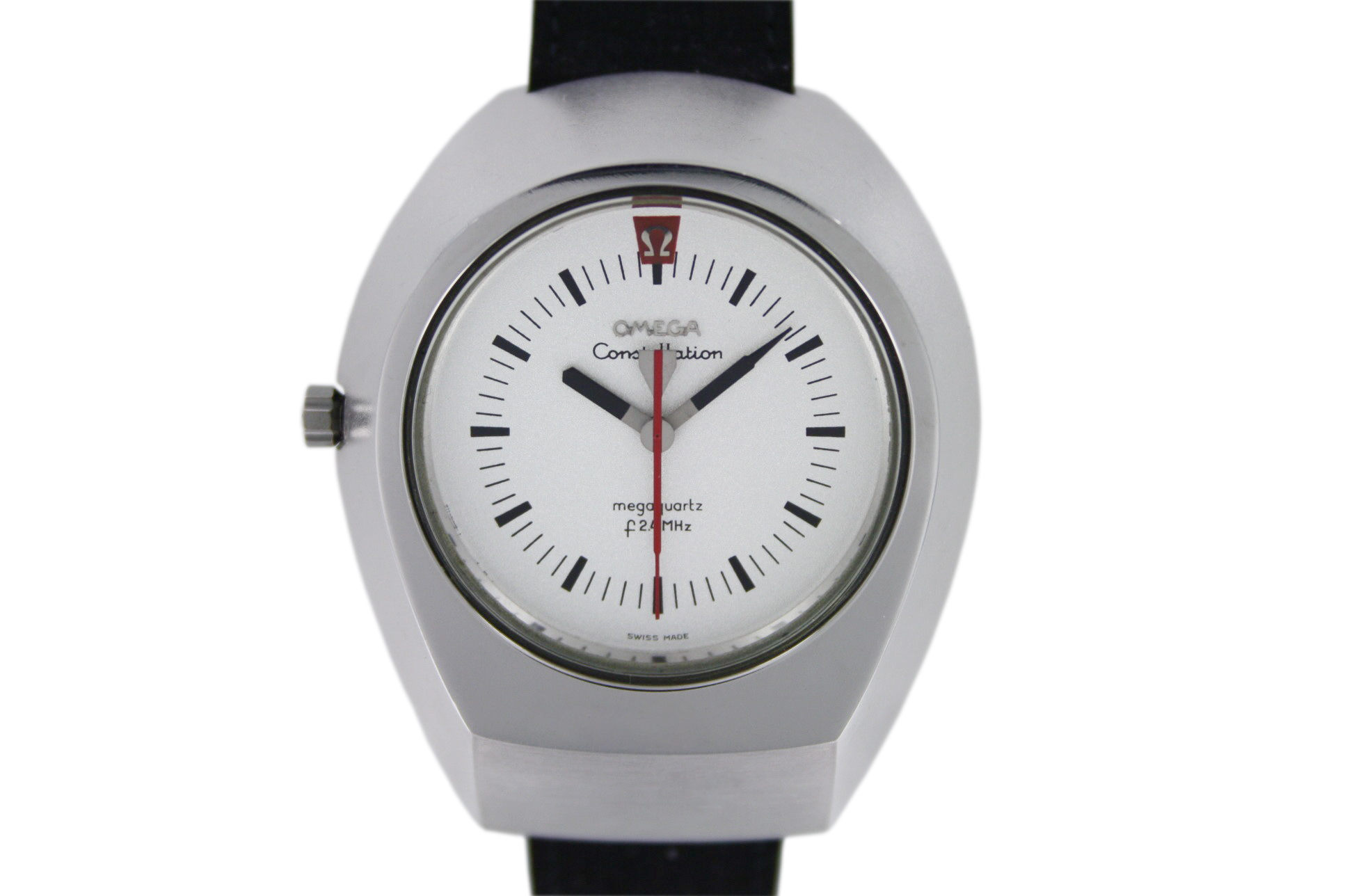
OMC prototype 1

The calibre 1500 ‘Elephant’ (known so because of the design of the movement with two large battery compartments resembling large ears) boasted an accuracy of 12 seconds per year, which equated to 1 second per month, five times more accurate than the beta 21 (the first Swiss production quartz watch) introduced to the market the year previous. The calibre 1500 was Omega’s first in-house quartz movement developed under project leader John Othenin-Girard by SSIH.

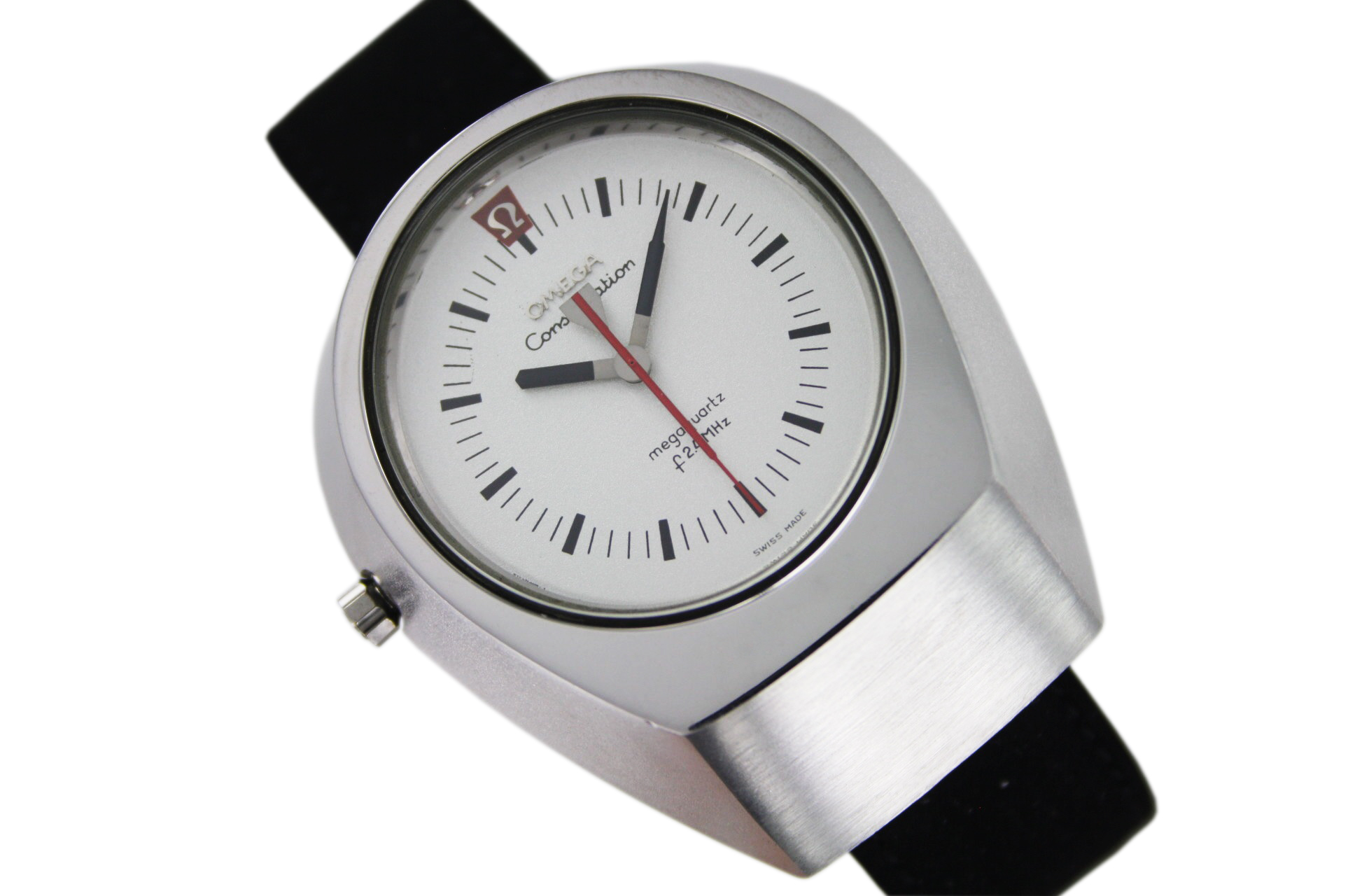
OMC prototype 2

The development of the calibre 1500 and subsequent successors cost Omega 30 million Swiss Francs with the sole intention to produce a wristwatch of unparalleled accuracy and performance. This significantly improved performance in time keeping was to be achieved by the development of a circular quartz resonator that vibrated at 2,359,356 times per second (a frequency of 2,359,356 Hz or ≈ 2.4 MHz), by comparison the Beta 21 quartz resonator (which as a watch had an accuracy of 5 seconds per month) vibrated at 8,192 times per second. The lenticular crystal oscillator in the calibre 1500, 1510, 1511 and 1516 was developed in the UK and used solely in the Megaquartz calibre 2400 series.

The five calibre 1500 watches produced achieved the required 1 second per month accuracy through a stable (non thermo compensated) quartz resonator as part of an integrated circuit which divided the huge frequency to produce pulses which ran the electromagnetic motor. These watches were the first to feature a time zone adjuster, which allowed the hour to be adjusted without interfering with the minute or second hand, this is a feature, followed through into the production watch alongside the later introduction of a second trimmer.

The design of the calibre 1500 was modular, which translated into the production watch, however the movement design and layout of the final calibre 1511 and subsequent calibre 1516 was completely different. One of the major flaws of the calibre 1500 was battery consumption (from the twin cells), although untested until recently when one of the prototypes came to market as a running watch in 2011. The owner, Omega collector Thomas Dick, tested the watch and concluded that the battery life of the twin (344) cells was approximately 5 weeks, however the accuracy when bench tested was 0.03 seconds per day, still equating to 12 second per year.

There were numerous other prototypes of the calibre 1510 watches, most of which were around case design, there are a number in private hands as well as a selection of prototype case designs and dial variations at the Omega museum in Bienne, Switzerland. These prototype watches were no calibre variations but alternative designs for cases and dials which ultimately led to the production watch.

== Production watches ==
By 1974 Omega had developed a more stable production version of the original calibre 1500 Megaquartz. It was released to the market in two versions of 1000 units each.

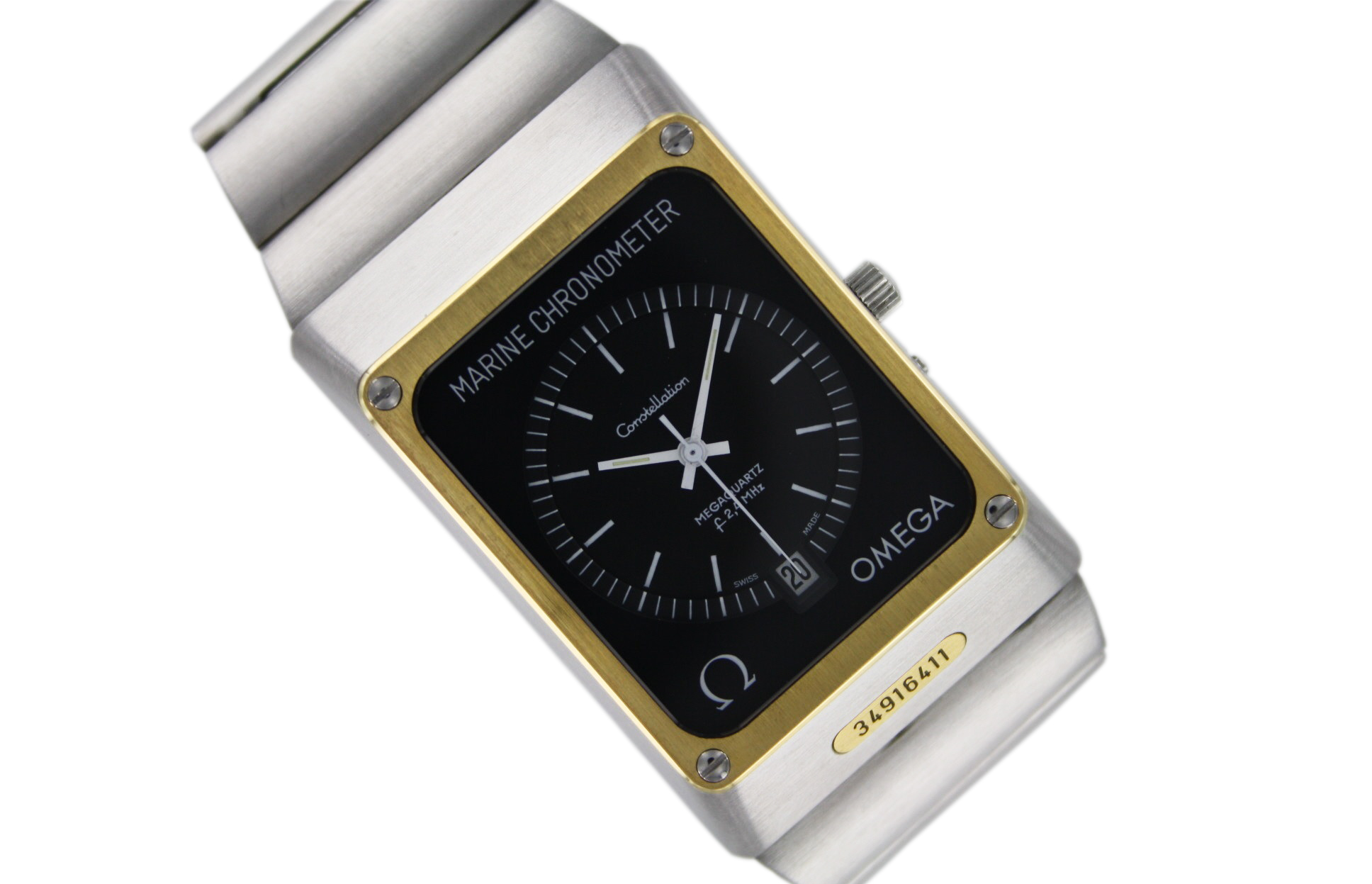
OMC calibre 1511

Calibre 1511: Marine Chronometer, this watch was certified at the Besançon Institute. All 1000 examples were sent to the Besançon in France for testing of their chronometer status and after 63 days of relentless testing (including temperature variation testing) the mean variation was less than two thousandth of a second per day. All 1000 watches were certified as Marine Chronometers and presented with certificates showing their individual performance over the 63-day period.

The Marine Chronometer calibre 1511 was presented in a stainless steel case with integral bracelet with a solid 14-carat gold bezel and 14-carat gold plaque which bears the individual serial number of the movement.

Of the 1000 calibre 1511 watches produced approximately 900 had solid 14-carat bezels and plaque and 100 had stainless steel bezels and plaques, specifically designed for the French market in response to French law at the time requiring visible hall marks on all gold.

The 1511 Marine Chronometer was famously owned by Oceanographer Jacques Cousteau and when introduced in 1974 had a list price of £761, by contrast the Moonwatch was on the market at £124.50 and the now coveted Omega Bullhead was only £114.50.

Calibre 1510: A non Marine Chronometer designated watch with an accuracy of 1 second per month branded as the Constellation Megaquartz. The watch came in a very similar case to the Marine Chronometer but without the plaque and 14K bezel, available in Stainless Steel or 18 carat gold.

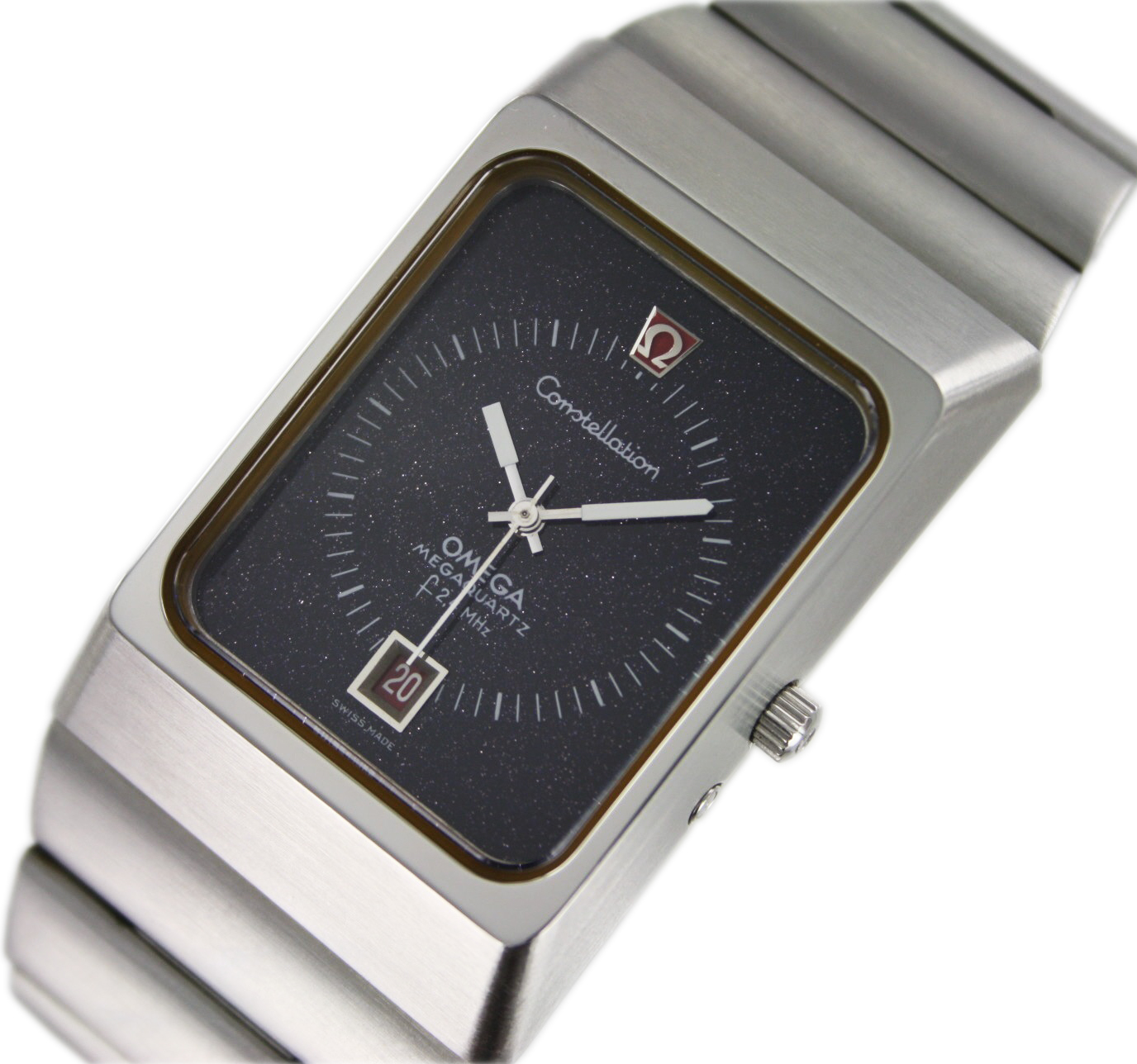
Constellation stardust 2

The Calibre 1510 was most famously produced with an aventurine crystal dial, nicknamed the ‘Stardust’. The watch came in a number of variations of dials: stardust (silver and gold), waffle dial in black, blue and brown and electric blue dial; The rarest of these variations is the blue waffle dial

The total production run of calibre 1510 was also 1000 units, around 800 of which were produced in stainless steel with a variety of dials and 200 were produced in solid 18 carat gold with either stardust, solid 18 carat or electric blue dials.

The original list price in 1974 for a calibre 1510 was £604 in stainless steel and £3275 in 18 carat gold.

The movement in both the 1510 and 1511 is fundamentally identical and all parts can be interchanged, the only difference in the two movements is the designation on the movement plate of either 1511 or 1510.

It is rumored that the caliber 1510 was also sent to Besançon for certification, however despite being tested and performing to the same level as the Marine Chronometer was never certified. A number of the remaining calibre 1510 watches had individual numbers engraved on the case back, this was to allow their identification during testing.

It is most likely that this was a marketing decision by Omega so as not to degrade the marketability of the Marine Chronometer, for which Omega charged a £157 premium at the time (which was the same price as a brand new Omega Flightmaster on bracelet).

== Further developments ==
In 1976 Omega refined the design of the Marine Chronometer and the Constellation (previous known as Calibre 1510) with the introduction of the caliber 1516 Marine Chronometer and the documented introduction of the calibre 1515 in Constellation models.

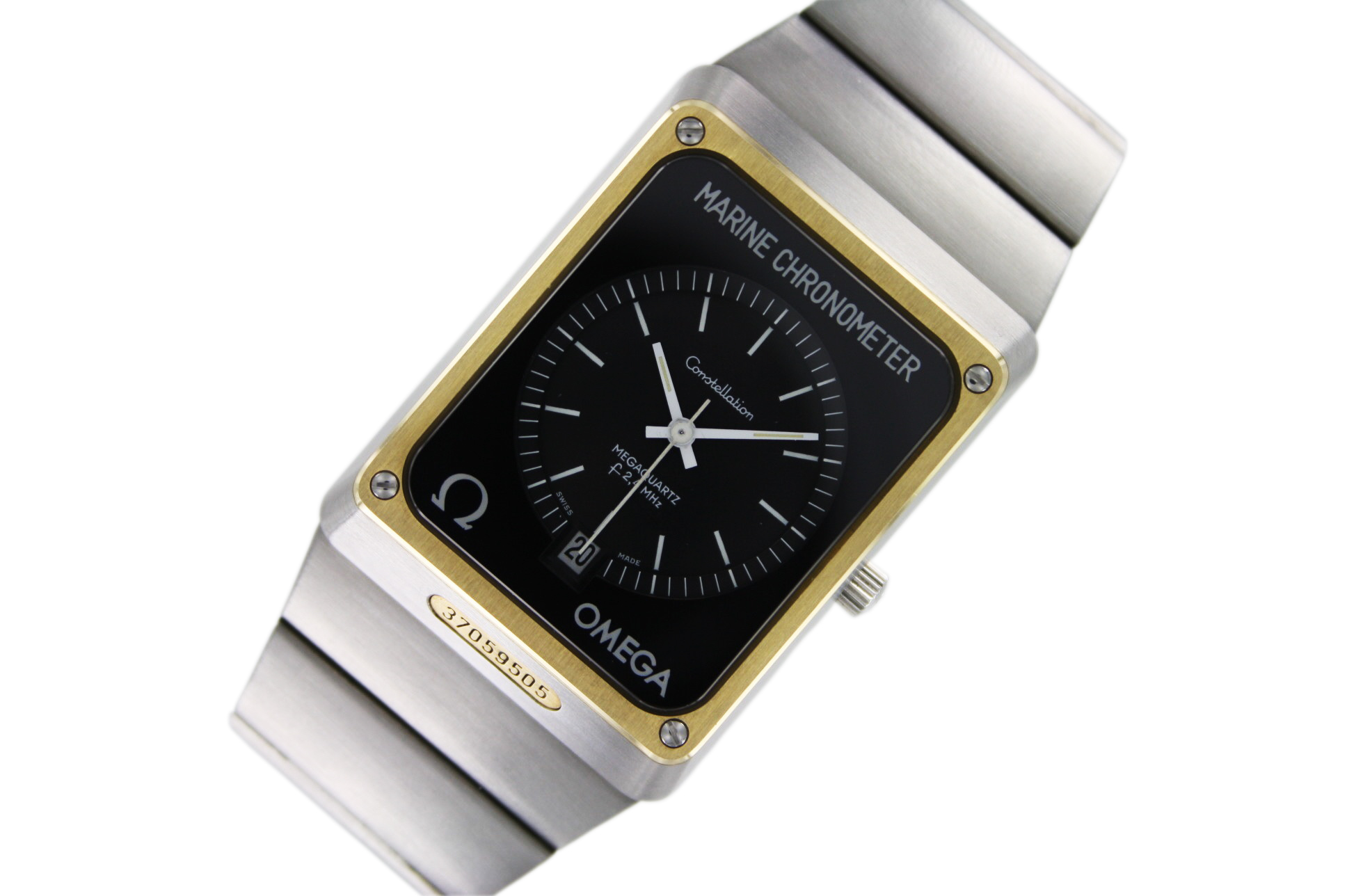
OMC calibre 1516

Although widely documented, the caliber 1515 has never been seen as available on the open market, although it does appear in Omega literature but appears cosmetically identical to the calibre 1516 but with a 1510/1511 circuit, however Omega didn't produce a non Marine Chronometer/ Constellation in the smaller case type and as such it is highly unlikely the 1515 went into production watches.

The calibre 1516 movement however was different in design to the 1511, specifically around the main-plate, which was reduced in the size of the movement by 5mm to be able to accommodate the movement in a newly designed smaller Marine Chronometer case. The components of the movement remained fundamentally identical to those of the previous 1511 Marine Chronometer however the screws holes on the main plate (to attach the movement to the case) were removed and replaced by a more traditional movement clamping system.

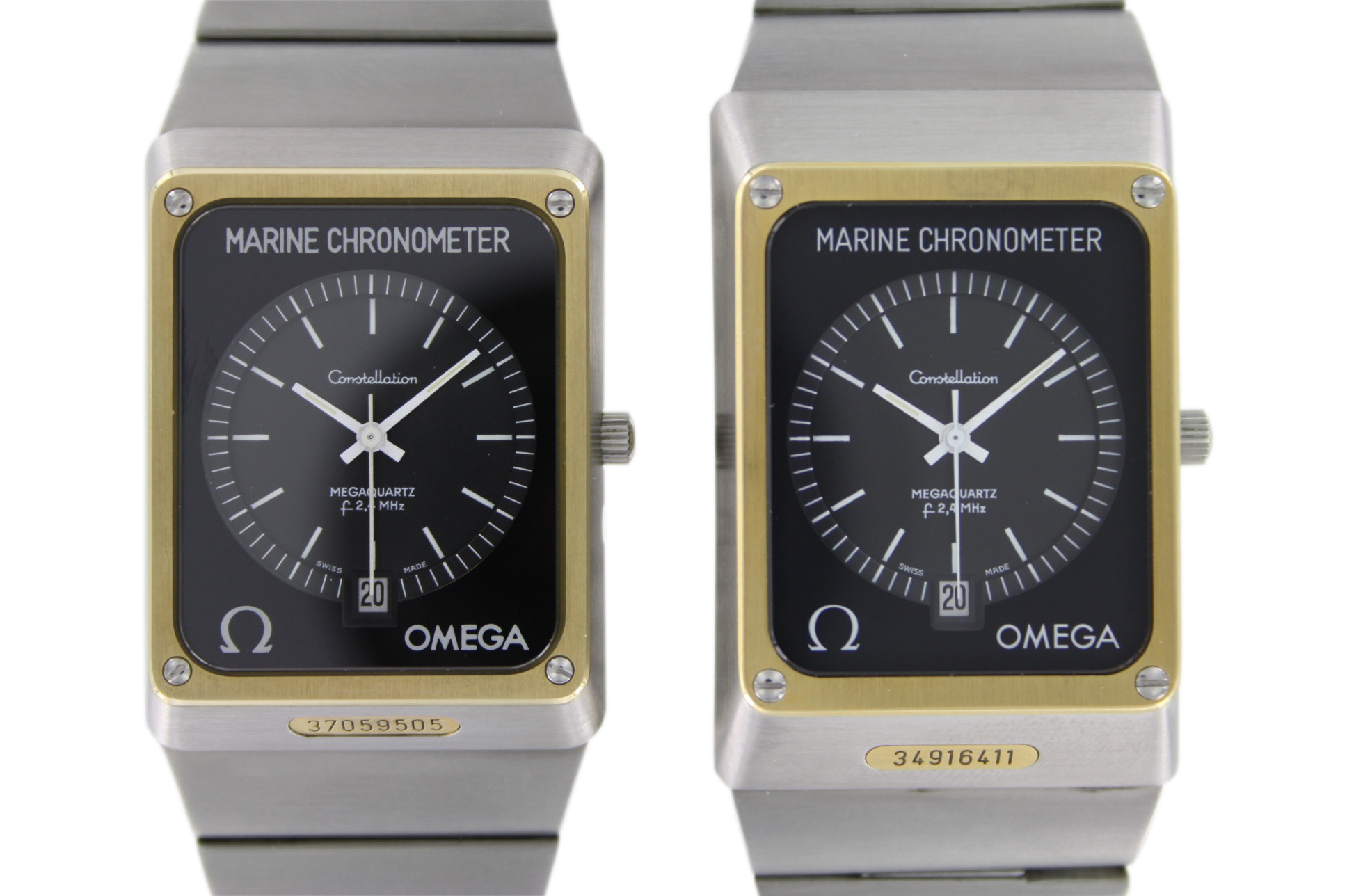
OMC comparison

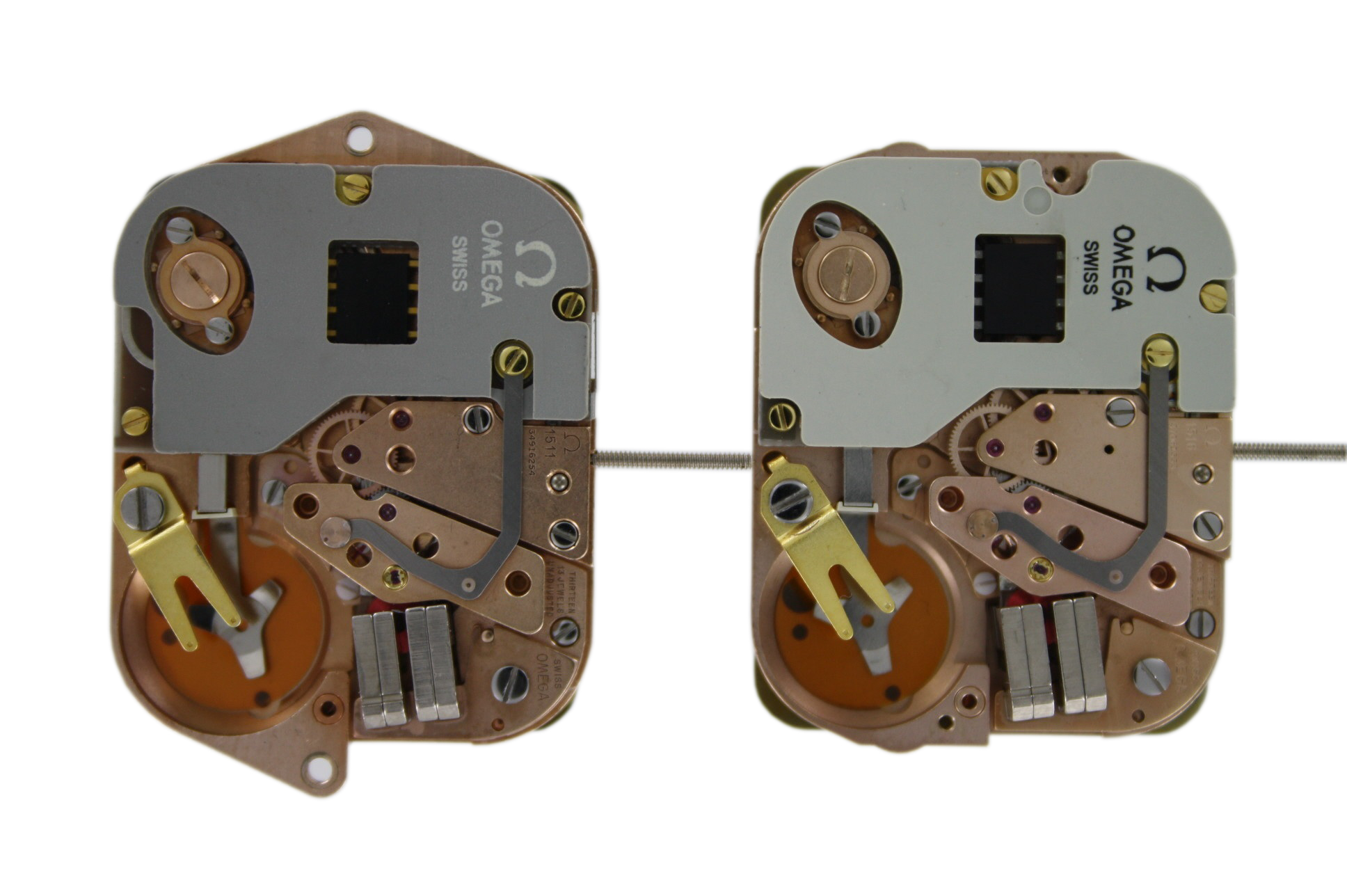
Omega 1511 and 1516 movement

The case design for the calibre 1516 looked cosmetically identical to that of the 1511 series and used the same 1209/202 integral bracelet, however it was a smaller watch in terms of height by 5mm and included the addition of a sapphire crystal (which had previously been mineral in the calibre 1511). The bezel on the 1516 was also bonded to the case and the 4 screws are purely cosmetic. The 1516 also had a slightly different positioning of the number plaque.

The 1516 Marine Chronometer was produced in 7000 units and sales ran between 1976 and circa 1980, by which point the watch had priced itself out of a much more competitive quartz market and changes in fashions and watch design had limited the Marine Chronometers marketability.

Of the 7000 examples of the 1516 Marine Chronometers made approximately 10 examples were made in 18K yellow gold with integral yellow gold bracelet and 18K white gold plaque and bezel. There are currently 2 known examples of the 18K Marine Chronometer in private hands. The 18 carat watches were commissioned and the cases produced individually by the Fontana factory in Italy. The 18K integral bracelet was identical to that used on the earlier 18K calibre 1510 watches.

== 4.19 MHz marine chronometer ==
In 1978 the French Naval Hydrographic and Oceanographic Service (French: Service hydrographique et océanographique de la Marine or SHOM) requested a quartz chronometer to acquire a reliable autonomous time source independent of external satellite and radio signals. The goal was a timepiece for navigational purposes, like establishing longitude by chronometer, with an accuracy better than 1 second a month. Thirty-six watch and clock companies applied.

Omega's entry used a calibre 1525 movement giving an accuracy of less than five seconds per year and was selected after a year of testing at sea by the French Navy Hydrographic and Oceanographic service.

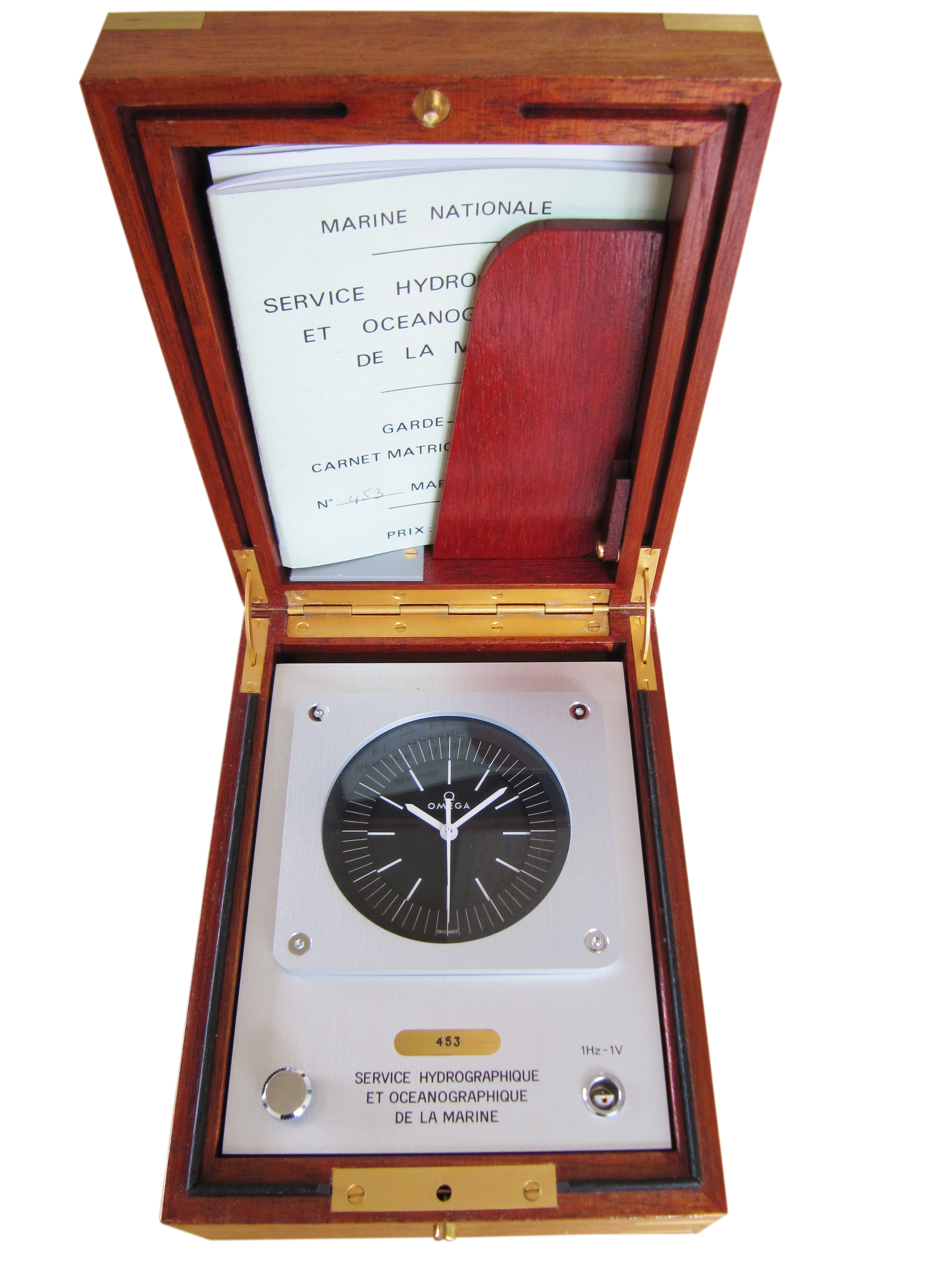
Omega Megaquartz Marine Chronometer, giving an accuracy better than ±5 seconds per year, French Navy issued, 1980

With the Omega Marine Chronometer wristwatch movement of 1974 as a basis a Quartz Marine Chronometer movement was designed with a high-frequency 4.19 MHz (precisely 2^{22}, or 4,194,304 Hz) quartz oscillator that should be capable of an accuracy of approximately ±0.01 second/day. Where quartz elements were usually lens-shaped, this one was barrel-shaped. It had very low ageing properties and a low thermic coefficient, and it was able to function between −10 and +60 ˚C. The timepiece was tested by the Neuchatel Observatory under rigorous conditions: temperature variations, thermal shocks, magnetic and electric fields, mechanical vibrations etc., which after 47 days of examination earned it the official quartz "Quartz Marine Chronometer" certificate. This is a higher standard than the Marine Chronometer (mechanical) by which standards the 1974 wrist Chronometer was tested. The chronometer featured an external electronic connection “1Hz – 1 V”, an electronic switch to stop the movement or operate at normal or double rate (the second hand advancing in ½ second increments for optimal timing of angle measurements of celestial objects) with a locking knob to prevent accidental actions, power reserve switch with power indicator to check the battery condition, and a frequency regulator.

The clock came onto the market in 1980 as the Omega Megaquartz Marine Chronometer at great expense, but was predominantly used for military applications with the French Navy, who used the Marine Chronometer in the majority of their fleet. By that time, bearings could be taken by means of satellite navigation. Nevertheless, French Navy regulations still required an independently operated timepiece on board so that, in combination with a sextant, the ship’s position could be determined by celestial navigation. The Marine version (ref. PE 5801) has extra shielding against radiation, the versions for the Public (PE 5802 and PE 5806) do not have this extra protection. At the time of production, this was the most precise portable autonomous timepiece, second only to an atomic clock.

The chronometer was supplied accompanied by an official "Quartz Marine Chronometer" certificate in a sturdy mahogany box with brass fitting and was very much a case of function over form and built to the highest of military specifications including anti-magnetic shielding. The clocks were all individually numbered on a brass plaque and ran on two standard 1.5 V AA type batteries. When changing the batteries they can be exchanged one by one to keep the time running. A set of batteries provided power for circa 2 to 3 years.

The 4.19 MHz technology was also used in Omega's range of LED timing equipment and prototyped in a wristwatch. The main movement of the watch was based on an Omega calibre 1343 Elan series but designated as 1522 it utilised a revolutionary 4.19 MHz micro quartz circuit, however there are only two known operational prototypes, one of which is now in the hands of a US collector and the other is in a collection in the UK.

== Summary ==
In total Omega produced a rumored 10,000 calibre 1500 family watches (around 2000 were in spares), although revolutionary their cost was prohibitive and with the speed of development of quartz during the 1970s Omega wrote off much of the original R&D costs and towards the end of their production run Omega offered the remaining examples to Omega employees at 350 Swiss Francs, 1/10th of the retail cost.

The Marine Chronometers and non Marine Chronometer calibre 1510 watches remain amongst the most significantly important Omegas ever made, one of the earliest quartz watches produced with an excellent accuracy, and to this day a serviced example will still be accurate to 1 second per month.
