= Quartz clock =

Clock type

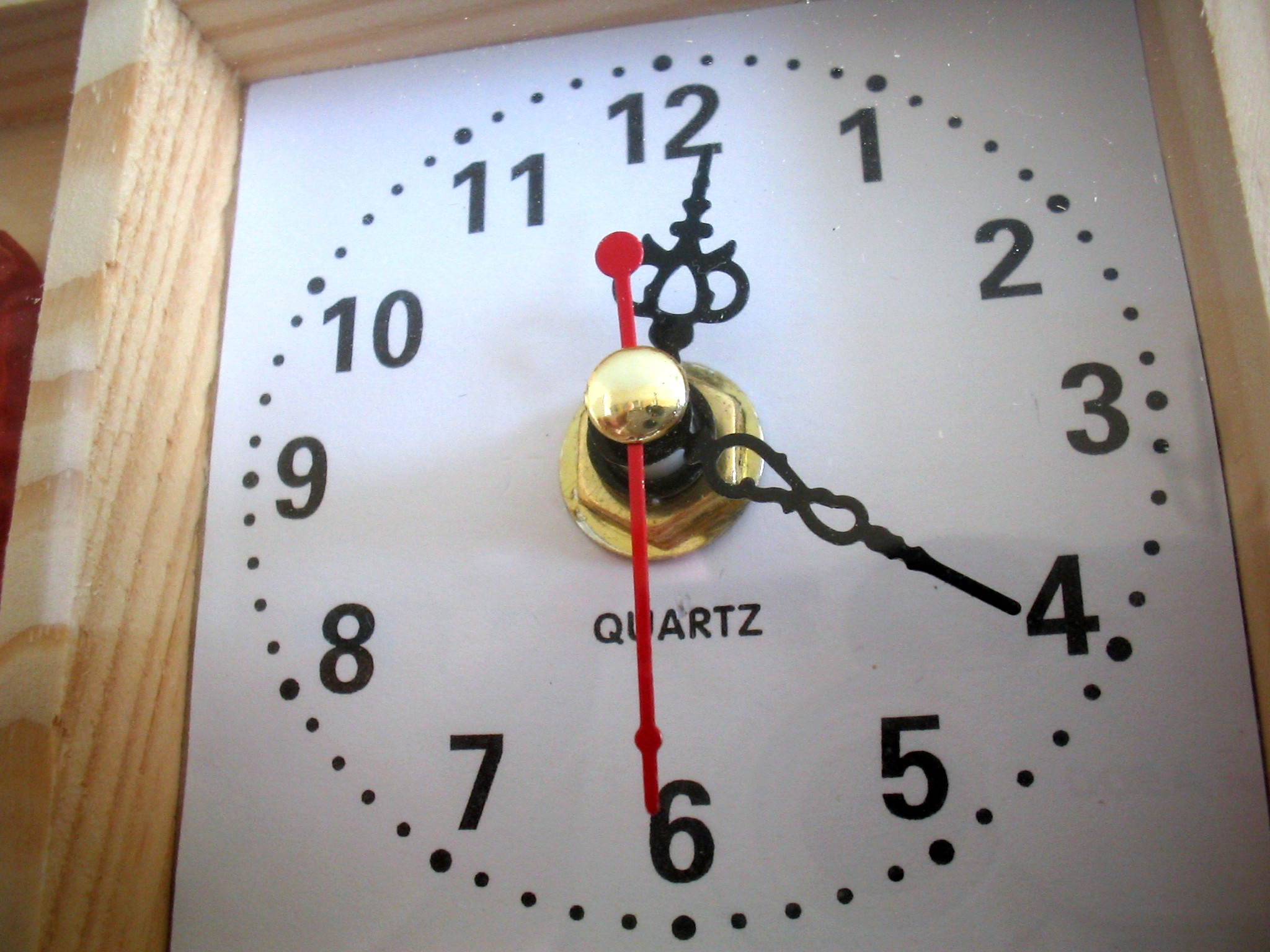
A basic analog quartz clock

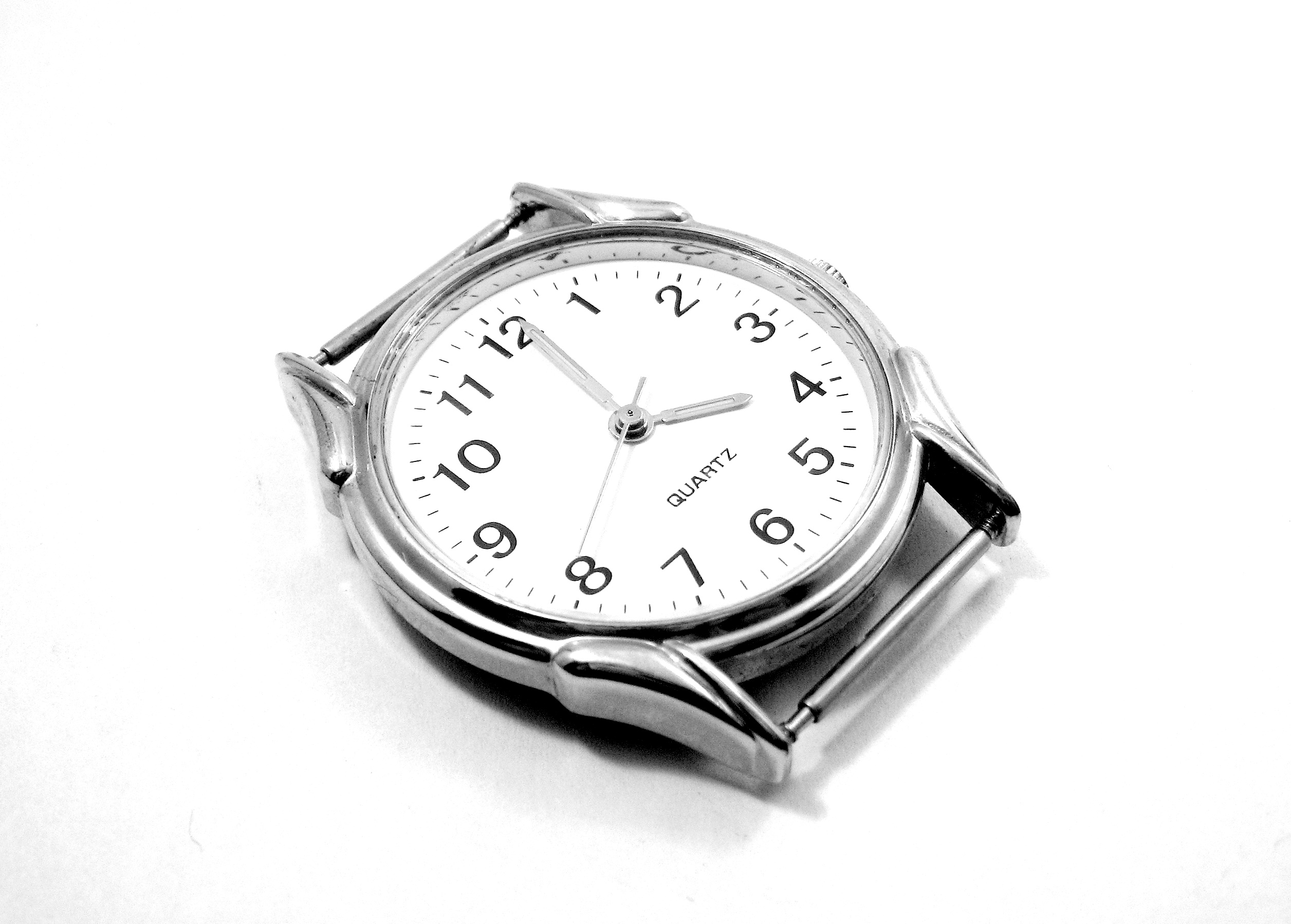
Modern quartz wristwatch

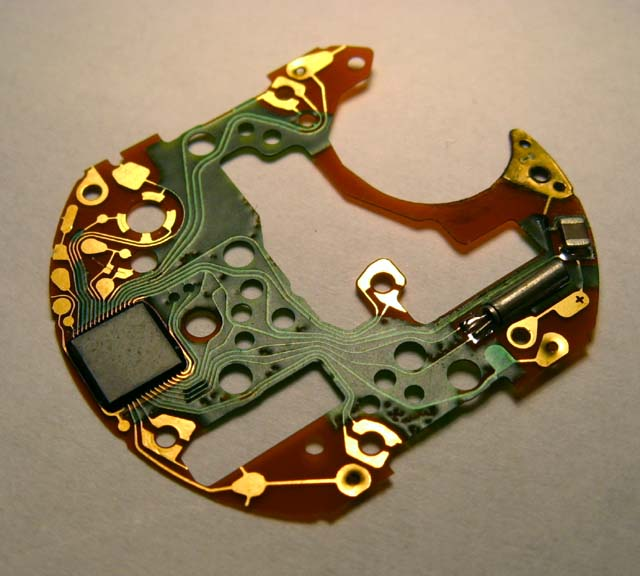
Circuit board of an e block from a chronograph-wristwatch. The quartz crystal oscillator can be seen on right.

Quartz clocks and quartz watches are timepieces that use an electronic oscillator regulated by a quartz crystal to keep time. The crystal oscillator, controlled by the resonant mechanical vibrations of the quartz crystal, creates a signal with very precise frequency, so that quartz clocks and watches are at least an order of magnitude more accurate than mechanical clocks. Generally, some form of digital logic counts the cycles of this signal and provides a numerical time display, usually in units of hours, minutes, and seconds.

As the advent of solid-state digital electronics in the 1980s allowed them to be made more compact and inexpensive, quartz timekeepers became the world's most widely used timekeeping technology, used in most clocks and watches as well as computers and other appliances that keep time.

== Explanation ==
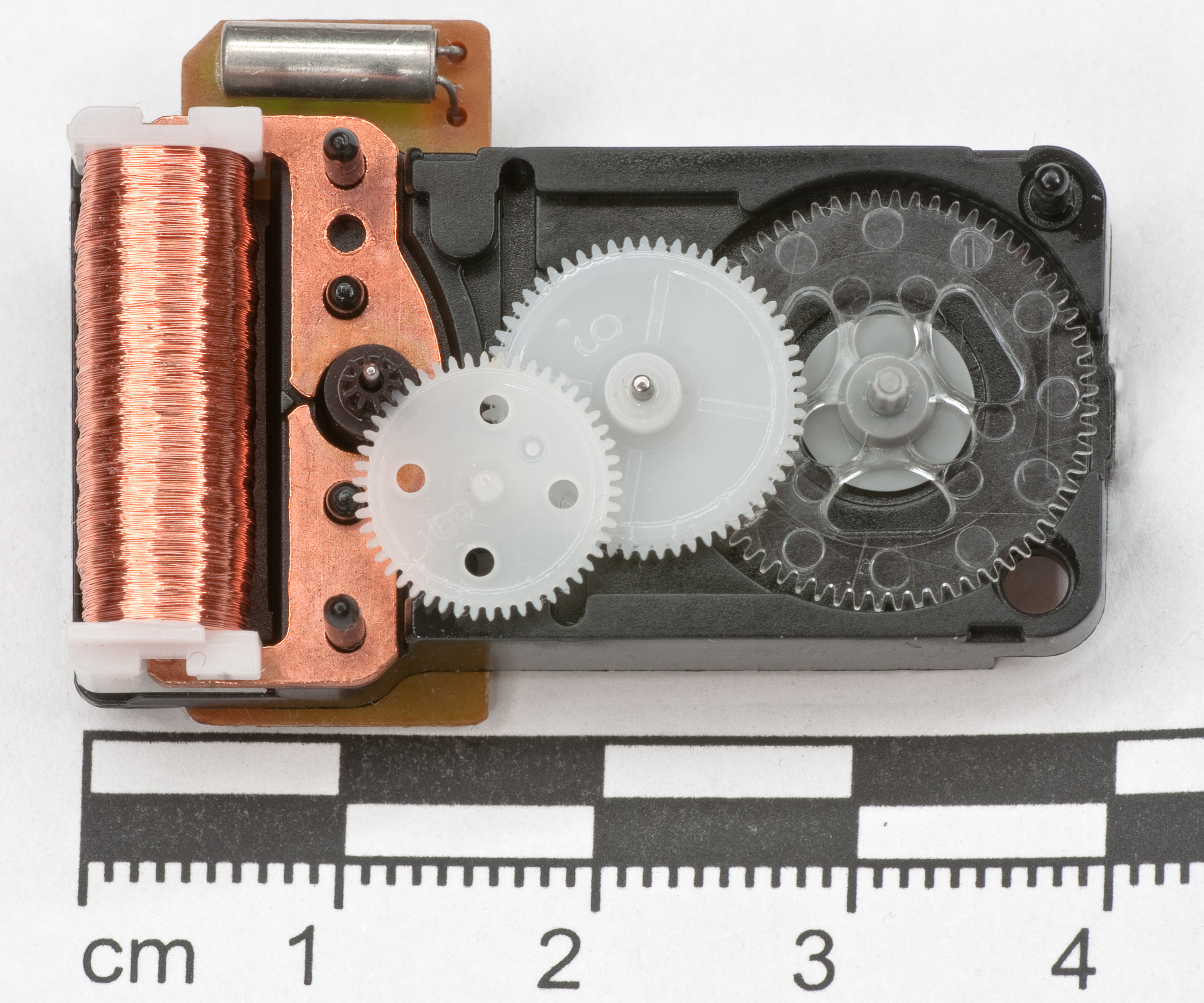
Disassembled analog quartz clockwork; quartz crystal oscillator (top left), Lavet-type stepping motor (left) with a black rotor sprocket and connected white and transparent gears (right). These gears control the movement of the second, minute and hour hands.

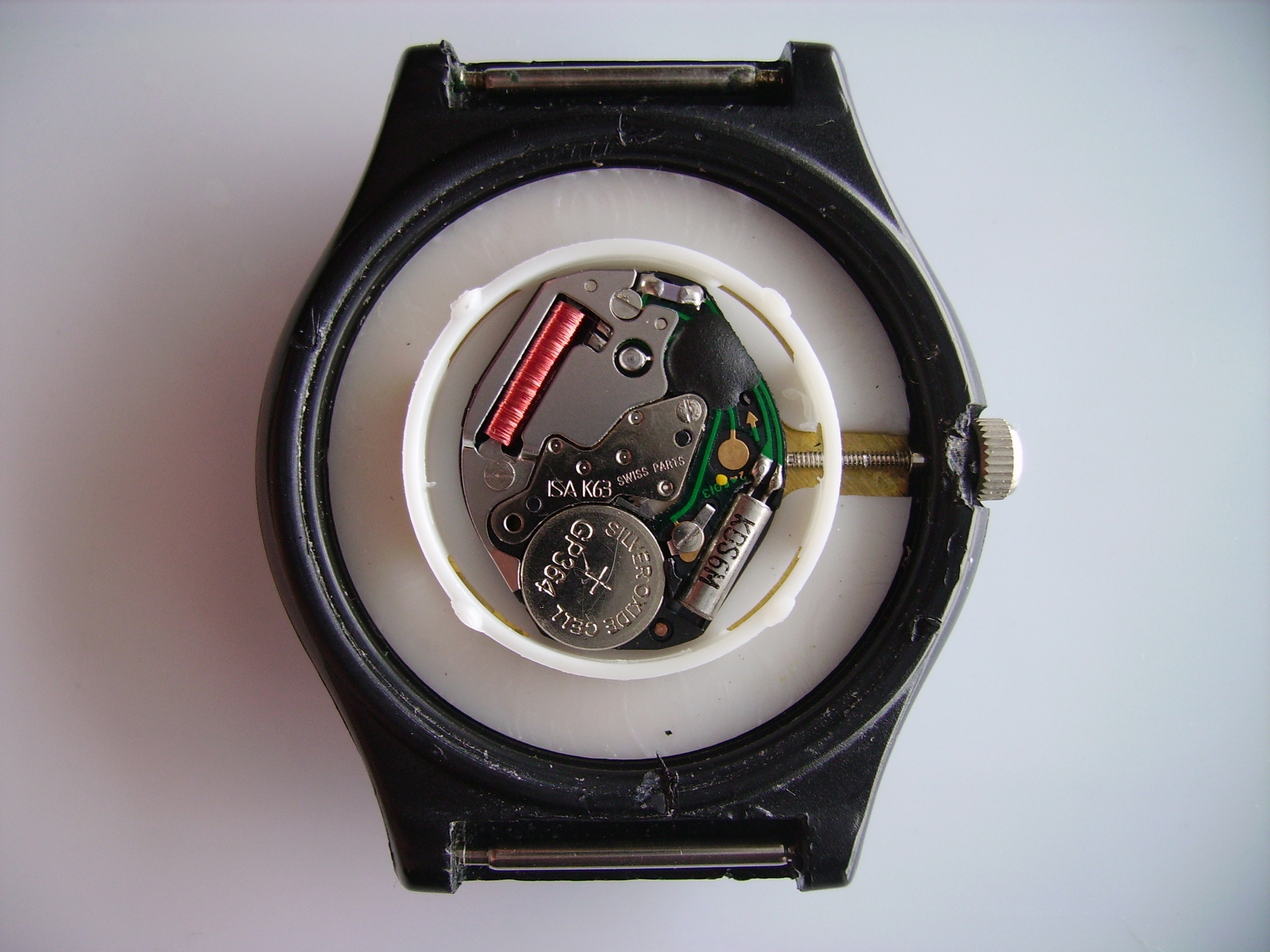
Basic quartz wristwatch movement. Bottom right: quartz crystal oscillator, left: button cell watch battery, top right: oscillator counter, digital frequency divider and driver for the stepping motor (under black epoxy), top left: the coil of the stepper motor that powers the watch hands.

Chemically, quartz is a specific form of a compound called silicon dioxide. Many materials can be formed into plates that will resonate. However, quartz is also a piezoelectric material: that is, when a quartz crystal is subject to mechanical stress, such as bending, it accumulates electrical charge across some planes. In a reverse effect, if charges are placed across the crystal plane, quartz crystals will bend. Since quartz can be directly driven (to flex) by an electric signal, no additional transducer is required to use it in a resonator. Similar crystals are used in low-end phonograph cartridges: The movement of the stylus (needle) flexes a quartz crystal, which produces a small voltage, which is amplified and played through speakers. Quartz microphones are still available, though not common.

Quartz has a further advantage in that its size does not change much as temperature fluctuates. Fused quartz is often used for laboratory equipment that must not change shape along with the temperature. A quartz plate's resonance frequency, based on its size, will not significantly rise or fall. Similarly, since its resonator does not change shape, a quartz clock will remain relatively accurate as the temperature changes.

In the early 20th century, radio engineers sought a precise, stable source of radio frequencies and started at first with steel resonators. However, when Walter Guyton Cady found in the early 1920s that quartz can resonate with less equipment and better temperature stability, steel resonators disappeared within a few years. Later, scientists at National Institute of Standards and Technology (then the U.S. National Bureau of Standards) discovered that a crystal oscillator could be more accurate than a pendulum clock.

The electronic circuit is an oscillator, an amplifier whose output passes through the quartz resonator. The resonator acts as an electronic filter, eliminating all but the single frequency of interest. The output of the resonator feeds back to the input of the amplifier, and the resonator assures that the oscillator runs at the exact frequency of interest. When the circuit is powered up, a single burst of shot noise (always present in electronic circuits) can cascade to bring the oscillator into oscillation at the desired frequency. If the amplifier were perfectly noise-free, the oscillator would not start.

The frequency at which the crystal oscillates depends on its shape, size, and the crystal plane on which the quartz is cut. The positions at which electrodes are placed can slightly change the tuning as well. If the crystal is accurately shaped and positioned, it will oscillate at a desired frequency. In nearly all quartz clocks and watches, the frequency is 32768 Hz, and the crystal is cut in a small tuning fork shape on a particular crystal plane. This frequency is a power of two (32768 = 2^{15}), just high enough to exceed the human hearing range, yet low enough to keep electric energy consumption, cost and size at a modest level and to permit inexpensive counters to derive a 1-second pulse. The data line output from such a quartz resonator goes high and low 32768 times a second. This is fed into a flip-flop (which is essentially two transistors with a bit of cross-connection) which changes from low to high, or vice versa, whenever the line from the crystal goes from high to low. The output from that is fed into a second flip-flop, and so on through a chain of 15 flip-flops, each of which acts as an effective power of 2 frequency divider by dividing the frequency of the input signal by 2. The result is a 15-bit binary digital counter driven by the frequency that will overflow once per second, creating a digital pulse once per second. The pulse-per-second output can be used to drive many kinds of clocks. In analog quartz clocks and wristwatches, the electric pulse-per-second output is nearly always transferred to a Lavet-type stepping motor that converts the electronic input pulses from the flip-flops counting unit into mechanical output that can be used to move hands.

Each flip-flop decreases the frequency by a factor of 2

It is also possible for quartz clocks and watches to have their quartz crystal oscillate at a higher frequency than 32768 (= 2^{15}) Hz (high frequency quartz movements) and/or generate digital pulses more than once per second, to drive a stepping motor powered second hand at a higher power of 2 than once every second, but the electric energy consumption (drain on the battery) goes up because higher oscillation frequencies and any activation of the stepping motor costs energy, making such small battery powered quartz watch movements relatively rare. Some analog quartz clocks feature a sweep second hand moved by a non-stepped battery or mains powered electric motor, often resulting in reduced mechanical output noise.

== Mechanism ==
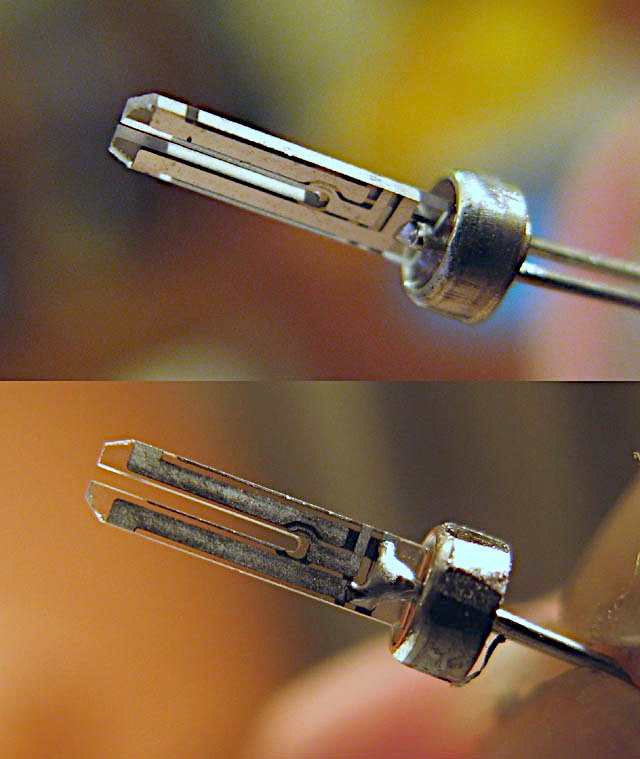
Picture of a quartz crystal resonator, used as the timekeeping component in quartz watches and clocks, with the case removed. It is formed in the shape of a tuning fork. Most such quartz clock crystals vibrate at a frequency of 32768 Hz.

In modern standard-quality quartz clocks, the quartz-crystal resonator or oscillator is cut in the shape of a small tuning fork (XY-cut), laser-trimmed or precision-lapped to vibrate at 32768 Hz. This frequency is equal to 2^{15} cycles per second. A power of 2 is chosen so a simple chain of digital divide-by-2 stages can derive the 1 Hz signal needed to drive the watch's second hand. In most clocks, the resonator is in a small cylindrical or flat package, about 4 to 6 mm (0.16 to 0.24 in) long. The 32768 Hz resonator has become so common due to a compromise between the large physical size of low-frequency crystals for watches and the larger current drain of high-frequency crystals, which reduces the life of the watch battery.

The basic formula for calculating the fundamental frequency $f$ of vibration of a cantilever as a function of its dimensions (quadratic cross-section) is

$$f = \frac{1.875104^2}{2\pi} \frac{a}{l^2} \sqrt{\frac{E}{12 \rho}},$$

where

$1.875104$ (rounded) is the smallest positive solution of the equation $\cos(x) \cosh(x) = -1$;
$l$ is the length of the cantilever;
$a$ is its thickness along the direction of motion;
$E$ is its Young's modulus; and
$\rho$ is its density.

A cantilever made of quartz ($E$ = 10^{11} N/m^{2} = 100 GPa = 15 million psi; $\rho$ = 2.625 g/cm^{3} = 0.0948 lb/cu in), with a length of 3 mm (0.12 in) and a thickness of 0.3 mm (0.012 in), thus has a fundamental frequency around 33 kHz. The crystal is tuned to exactly 2^{15} = 32768 Hz, or runs at a slightly higher frequency with inhibition compensation (see below).

== Accuracy ==
The relative stability of the quartz resonator and its driving circuit is much better than its absolute accuracy. Standard-quality 32768 Hz resonators of this type are warranted to have a long-term accuracy of about six parts per million (0.0006%) at 31 °C (87.8 °F): that is, a typical quartz clock or wristwatch will gain or lose 15 seconds per 30 days (within a normal temperature range of 5 to 35 °C or 41 to 95 °F) or less than a half second clock drift per day when worn near the body.

=== Temperature and frequency variation ===
Though quartz has a very low coefficient of thermal expansion, temperature changes are the major cause of frequency variation in crystal oscillators. The most obvious way of reducing the effect of temperature on the oscillation rate is to keep the crystal at a constant temperature. For laboratory-grade oscillators, an oven-controlled crystal oscillator is used, in which the crystal is kept in a very small oven that is held at a constant temperature. This method is, however, impractical for consumer quartz clock and wristwatch movements.

The crystal planes and tuning of consumer-grade clock crystal resonators used in wristwatches are designed for minimal temperature sensitivity to frequency and operate best at a temperature range of about 25 to 28 °C (77 to 82 °F). The exact temperature where the crystal oscillates at its fastest is called the "turnover point" and can be chosen within limits. A well-chosen turnover point can minimize the negative effect of temperature-induced frequency drift, and hence improve the practical timekeeping accuracy of a consumer-grade crystal oscillator without adding significant cost. A higher or lower temperature will result in a −0.035 ppm/°C^{2} (slower) oscillation rate. So a ±1 °C temperature deviation will account for a (±1)^{2} × −0.035 ppm = −0.035 ppm rate change, which is equivalent to −1.1 seconds per year. If, instead, the crystal experiences a ±10 °C temperature deviation, then the rate change will be (±10)^{2} × −0.035 ppm = −3.5 ppm, which is equivalent to −110 seconds per year.

Quartz watch manufacturers use a simplified version of the oven-controlled crystal oscillator method by recommending that their watches be worn regularly to ensure the best time-keeping performance. Regular wearing of a quartz watch significantly reduces the magnitude of environmental temperature swings, since a correctly designed watch case forms an expedient crystal oven that uses the stable temperature of the human body to keep the crystal oscillator in its most accurate temperature range.

=== Accuracy enhancement ===
Some movement designs feature accuracy-enhancing features or self-rate and self-regulate. That is, rather than just counting vibrations, their computer program takes the simple count and scales it using a ratio calculated between an epoch set at the factory, and the most recent time the clock was set. Clocks that are sometimes regulated by service centers with the help of a precision timer and adjustment terminal after leaving the factory, also become more accurate as their quartz crystal ages and somewhat unpredictable aging effects are appropriately compensated.

Autonomous high-accuracy quartz movements, even in wristwatches, can be accurate to within ±1 to ±25 seconds per year and can be certified and used as marine chronometers to determine longitude (the East–West position of a point on the Earth's surface) by means of celestial navigation. When time at the prime meridian (or another starting point) is accurately enough known, celestial navigation can determine longitude, and the more accurately time is known the more accurate the latitude determination. At latitude 45° one second of time is equivalent in longitude to 1,077.8 ft (328.51 m), or one-tenth of a second means 107.8 ft (32.86 m).

==== Trimmer condenser ====
Regardless of the precision of the oscillator, a quartz analog or digital watch movement can have a trimmer condenser. They are generally found in older, vintage quartz watches – even many of the cheaper ones. A trimmer condenser or variable capacitor changes the frequency coming from the quartz crystal oscillator when its capacitance is changed. The frequency dividers remain unchanged, so the trimmer condenser can be used to adjust the electric pulse-per-second (or other desired time interval) output. The trimmer condenser looks like a small screw that has been wired into the circuit board. Typically, turning the screw clockwise speeds the movement up, and counterclockwise slows it down at about 1 second per day per 1/6 turn of the screw. Few newer quartz movement designs feature a mechanical trimmer condenser and rely on generally digital correction methods.

==== Thermal compensation ====
Accuracy-enhanced quartz clocks

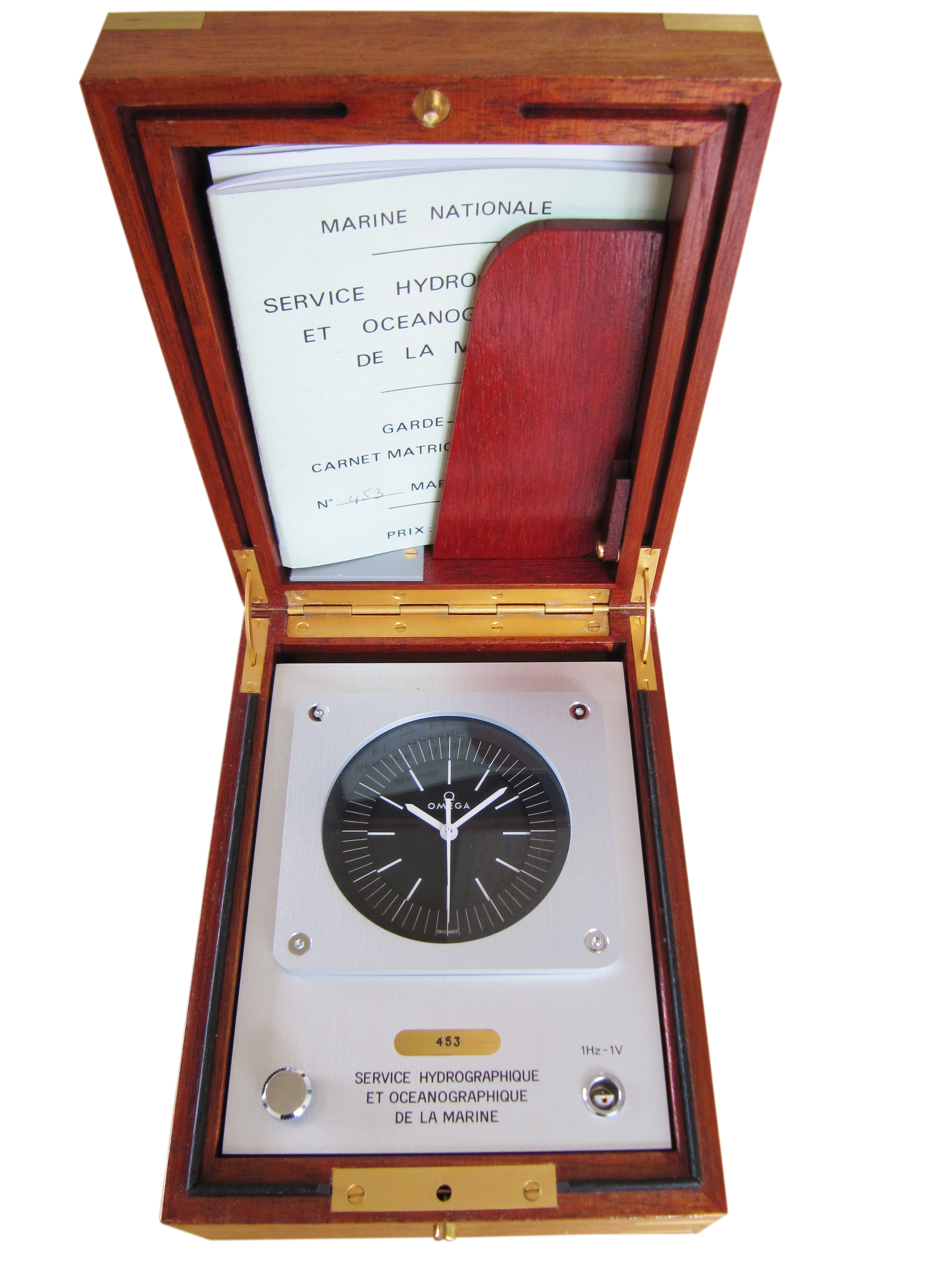
Omega 4.19 MHz high frequency quartz resonator Ships Marine Chronometer giving an accuracy better than ± 5 seconds per year, French Navy issued

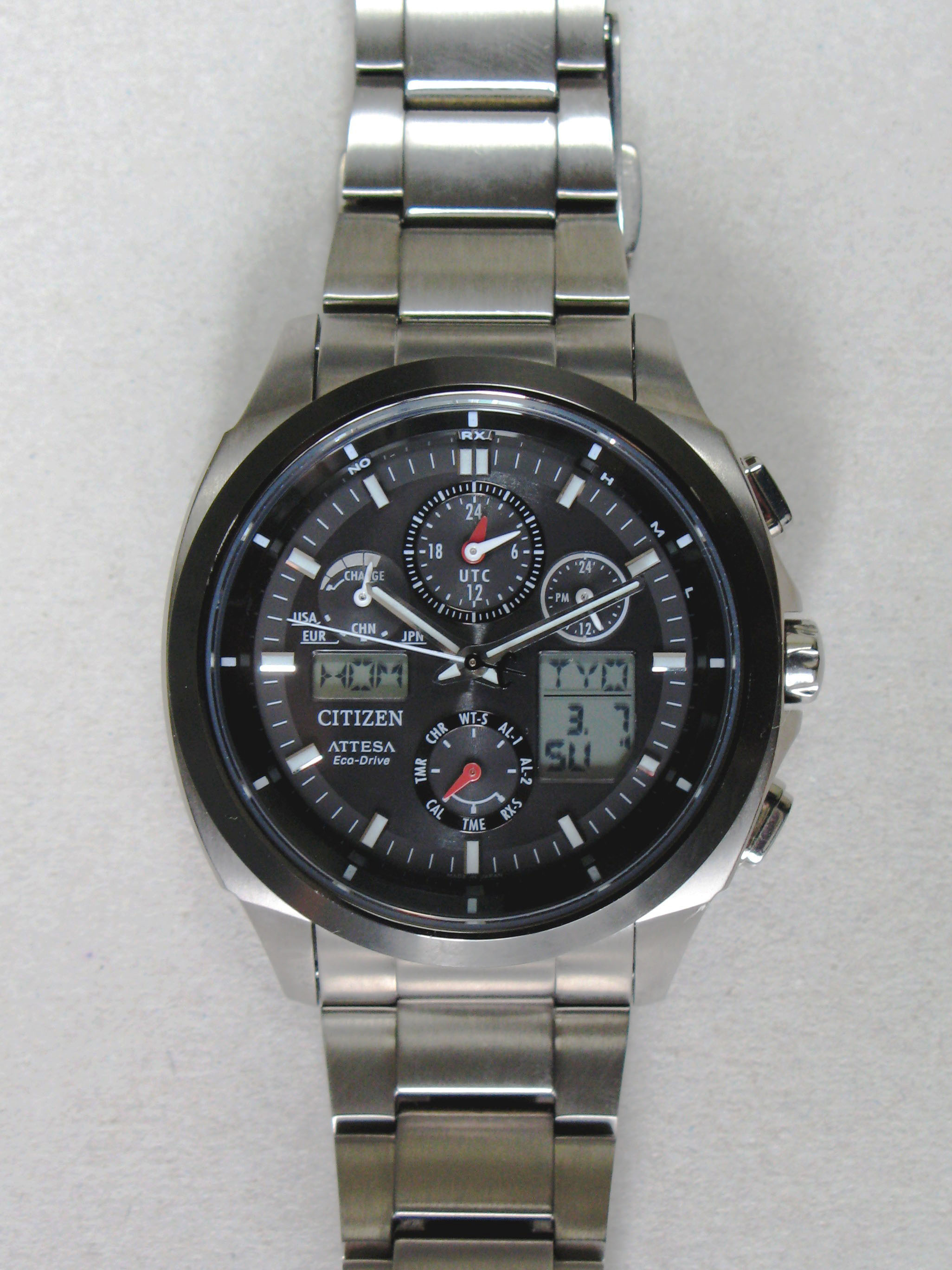
Citizen analog-digital chronograph with 4 area radio time signal reception (North America, Europe, China, Japan) and radio-controlled synchronization

It is possible for a computerized high-accuracy quartz movement to measure its temperature and adjust for that. For this the movement autonomously measures the crystal's temperature a few hundred to a few thousand times a day and compensates for this with a small calculated offset. Both analog and digital temperature compensation have been used in high-end quartz watches. In more expensive high-end quartz watches, thermal compensation can be implemented by varying the number of cycles to inhibit depending on the output from a temperature sensor. The COSC average daily rate standard for officially certified COSC quartz chronometers is ±25.55 seconds per year at 23 °C or 73 °F. To acquire the COSC chronometer label, a quartz instrument must benefit from thermo-compensation and rigorous encapsulation. Each quartz chronometer is tested for 13 days, in one position, at 3 different temperatures and 4 different relative humidity levels. Only approximately 0.2% of the Swiss made quartz watches are chronometer-certified by the COSC. These COSC chronometer-certified movements can be used as marine chronometers to determine longitude by means of celestial navigation.

==== Additional accuracy enhancing methods ====
As of 2019, an autonomous light-powered high-accuracy quartz watch movement became commercially available which is claimed to be accurate to ± 1 second per year. Key elements to obtain the high claimed accuracy are applying an unusually shaped (for a watch) (AT-cut) quartz crystal operated at 2^{23} or 8388608 Hz frequency, thermal compensation and hand selecting pre-aged crystals. AT-cut variations allow for greater temperature tolerances, specifically in the range of −40 to 125 °C (−40 to 257 °F), they exhibit reduced deviations caused by gravitational orientation changes. As a result, errors caused by spatial orientation and positioning become less of a concern.

==== Inhibition compensation ====
Many inexpensive quartz clocks and watches use a rating and compensation technique known as inhibition compensation. The crystal is deliberately made to run somewhat faster. After manufacturing, each module is calibrated against a precision clock at the factory and adjusted to keep accurate time by programming the digital logic to skip a small number of crystal cycles at regular intervals, such as 10 seconds or 1 minute. For a typical quartz movement, this allows programmed adjustments in 7.91 seconds per 30 days increments for 10-second intervals (on a 10-second measurement gate) or programmed adjustments in 1.32 seconds per 30 days increments for 60-second intervals (on a 60-second measurement gate). The advantage of this method is that using digital programming to store the number of pulses to suppress in a non-volatile memory register on the chip is less expensive than the older technique of trimming the quartz tuning-fork frequency. The inhibition-compensation logic of some quartz movements can be regulated by service centers with the help of a professional precision timer and adjustment terminal after leaving the factory, though many inexpensive quartz watch movements do not offer this functionality.

==== External time signal correction ====
If a quartz movement is daily "rated" by measuring its timekeeping characteristics against a radio time signal or satellite time signal, to determine how much time the movement gained or lost between time signal receptions, and adjustments are made to the circuitry to "regulate" the timekeeping, then the corrected time will be accurate within ±1 second per year. This is more than adequate to perform longitude determination by celestial navigation. These quartz movements over time become less accurate when no external time signal has been successfully received and internally processed to set or synchronize their time automatically, and without such external compensation generally fall back on autonomous timekeeping. The United States National Institute of Standards and Technology (NIST) has published guidelines recommending that these movements keep the time between synchronizations to within ±0.5 seconds to keep time correct when rounded to the nearest second. Some of these movements can keep the time between synchronizations to within ±0.2 seconds by synchronizing more than once spread over a day.

== Quartz crystal aging ==
Clock quartz crystals are manufactured in an ultra-clean environment, then protected by an inert ultra-high vacuum in hermetically sealed containers. Despite these measures, the frequency of a quartz crystal can slowly change over time. The effect of aging is much smaller than the effect of frequency variation caused by temperature changes, however, and manufacturers can estimate its effects. Generally, the aging effect eventually decreases a given crystal's frequency but it can also increase a given crystal's frequency.

Factors that can cause a small frequency drift over time are stress relief in the mounting structure, loss of hermetic seal, contamination of the crystal lattice, moisture absorption, changes in or on the quartz crystal, severe shock and vibrations effects, and exposure to very high temperatures. Crystal aging tends to be logarithmic, meaning the maximum rate of change of frequency occurs immediately after manufacture and decays thereafter. Most of the aging will occur within the first year of the crystal's service life. Crystals do eventually stop aging (asymptotically), but it can take many years. Movement manufacturers can pre-age crystals before assembling them into clock movements. To promote accelerated aging the crystals are exposed to high temperatures. If a crystal is pre-aged, the manufacturer can measure its aging rates (strictly, the coefficients in the aging formula) and have a microcontroller calculate out the corrections over time. The initial calibration of a movement will stay accurate longer if the crystals are pre-aged. The advantage would end after subsequent regulation which resets any cumulative aging error to zero. A reason more expensive movements tend to be more accurate is that the crystals are pre-aged longer and selected for better aging performance. Sometimes, pre-aged crystals are hand selected for movement performance.

== Chronometers ==
Quartz chronometers designed as time standards often include a crystal oven, to keep the crystal at a constant temperature. Some self-rate and include "crystal farms", so that the clock can take the average of a set of time measurements.

== External magnetic interference ==
The Lavet-type stepping motors used in analog quartz clock movements which themselves are driven by a magnetic field (generated by the coil) can be affected by external (nearby) magnetism sources, and this may impact the rotor sprocket output. As a result, the mechanical output of analog quartz clock movements may temporarily stop, advance or reverse and negatively impact correct timekeeping. As the strength of a magnetic field almost always decreases with distance, moving an analog quartz clock movement away from an interfering external magnetic source normally results in a resumption of correct mechanical output. Some quartz wristwatch testers feature a magnetic field function to test if the stepping motor can provide mechanical output and let the gear train and hands deliberately spin overly fast to clear minor fouling. In general, magnetism encountered in daily life has no effect on digital quartz clock movements since there are no stepping motors in these movements. Powerful magnetism sources like MRI magnets can damage quartz clock movements.

== History ==
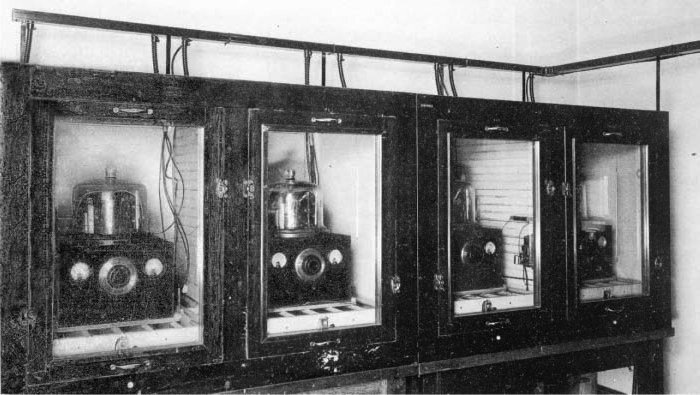
Four precision 100 kHz quartz oscillators at the US Bureau of Standards (now NIST) that became the first quartz frequency standard for the United States in 1929. Kept in temperature-controlled ovens to prevent frequency drift due to thermal expansion or contraction of the large quartz resonators (mounted under the glass domes on top of the units) they achieved accuracy of 10^{−7}, roughly 1 second error in 4 months.

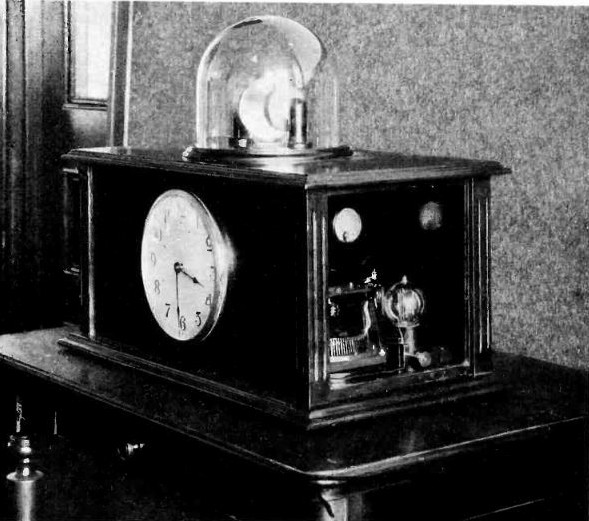
One of the first experimental quartz controlled clocks, built by Warren Marrison at Bell Labs in 1927. A vacuum tube oscillator controlled by the 100 kHz quartz crystal (under dome at top) is divided down by vacuum tube counters and runs the synchronous clock on front. Accuracy was 0.01 second per day

Early quartz clocks for consumers

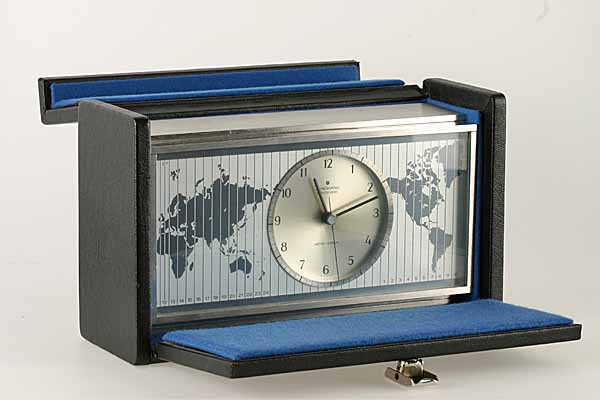
First European quartz clock for consumers "Astrochron", Junghans, Schramberg, 1967

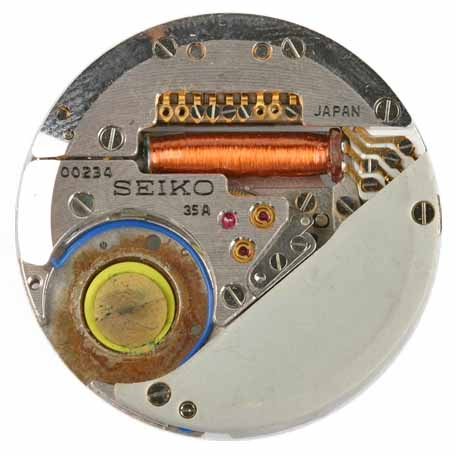
First quartz wristwatch movement, Caliber 35A, Seiko, Japan, 1969

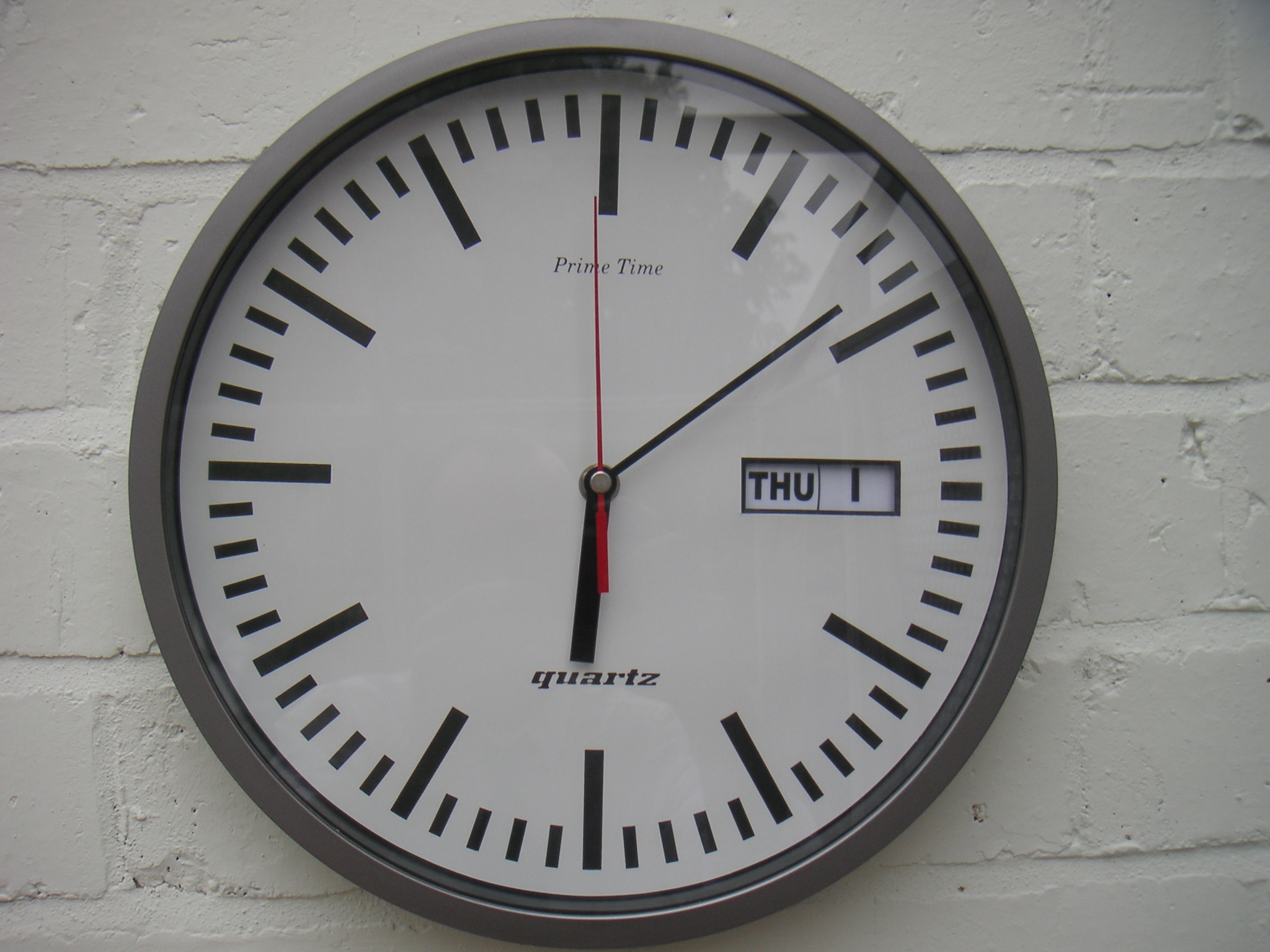
A quartz clock hung on a wall, 2005

The piezoelectric properties of quartz were discovered by Jacques Curie and Pierre Curie in 1880. The vacuum tube oscillator was invented in 1912. An electrical oscillator was first used to sustain the motion of a tuning fork by the British physicist William Eccles in 1919; his achievement removed much of the damping associated with mechanical devices and maximised the stability of the vibration's frequency. The first quartz crystal oscillator was built by Walter G. Cady in 1921. In 1923, D. W. Dye at the National Physical Laboratory in the UK and Warren Marrison at Bell Telephone Laboratories produced sequences of precision time signals with quartz oscillators.

In October 1927 the first quartz clock was described and built by Joseph W. Horton and Warren A. Marrison at Bell Telephone Laboratories. (Note: Quartz resonators can vibrate with very a small amplitude that can be precisely controlled, properties that allow them to have a remarkable degree of frequency stability.) The 1927 clock used a block of crystal, stimulated by electricity, to produce pulses at a frequency of 50,000 cycles per second. A submultiple controlled frequency generator then divided this down to a usable, regular pulse that drove a synchronous motor.

The next three decades saw the development of quartz clocks as precision time standards in laboratory settings; the bulky delicate counting electronics, built with vacuum tubes, limited their use elsewhere. In 1932 a quartz clock was able to measure tiny variations in the rotation rate of the Earth over periods as short as a few weeks. In Japan in 1932, Issac Koga developed a crystal cut that gave an oscillation frequency with greatly reduced temperature dependence. The National Bureau of Standards (now NIST) based the time standard of the US on quartz clocks between the 1930s and the 1960s, after which it transitioned to atomic clocks, which rely on the same mechanism that the International System of Units (SI) uses to define the second. In 1953, Longines deployed the first quartz movement. The wider use of quartz clock technology had to await the development of cheap semiconductor digital logic in the 1960s. The revised 1929 14th edition of Encyclopædia Britannica stated that quartz clocks would probably never be affordable enough to be used domestically.

Their inherent physical and chemical stability and accuracy have resulted in the subsequent proliferation, and since the 1940s they have formed the basis for precision measurements of time and frequency worldwide.

Developing quartz clocks for the consumer market took place during the 1960s. One of the first successes was a portable quartz clock called the Seiko Crystal Chronometer QC-951. This portable clock was used as a backup timer for marathon events in the 1964 Summer Olympics in Tokyo. In 1966, prototypes of the world's first quartz pocket watch were unveiled by Seiko and Longines in the Neuchâtel Observatory's 1966 competition. In 1967, both the CEH and Seiko presented prototypes of quartz wristwatches to the Neuchâtel Observatory competition. The world's first prototype analog quartz wristwatches were revealed in 1967: the Beta 1 revealed by the Centre Electronique Horloger (CEH) in Neuchâtel Switzerland, and the prototype of the Astron revealed by Seiko in Japan (Seiko had been working on quartz clocks since 1958). The first Swiss quartz watch – the Ebauches SA Beta 21 – arrived at the 1970 Basel Fair. In December 1969, Seiko produced the world's first commercial quartz wristwatch, the Seiko Quartz-Astron 35SQ which is now honored with IEEE Milestone. The Astron had a quartz oscillator with a frequency of 8,192 Hz and was accurate to 0.2 seconds per day, 5 seconds per month, or 1 minute per year. The Astron was released less than a year prior to the introduction of the Swiss Beta 21, which was developed by 16 Swiss Watch manufacturers and used by Rolex, Patek and Omega in their electroquartz models. These first quartz watches were quite expensive and marketed as luxury watches. The inherent accuracy and eventually achieved low cost of production have resulted in the proliferation of quartz clocks and watches since that time.

Girard-Perregaux introduced the Caliber 350 in 1971, with an advertised accuracy within about 0.164 seconds per day, which had a quartz oscillator with a frequency of 32,768 Hz, which was faster than previous quartz watch movements and has since become the oscillation frequency used by most quartz clocks. The introduction during the 1970s of metal–oxide–semiconductor (MOS) integrated circuits allowed a 12-month battery life from a single coin cell when driving either a mechanical Lavet-type stepping motor, a smooth sweeping non-stepping motor, or a liquid-crystal display (in an LCD digital watch). Light-emitting diode (LED) displays for watches have become rare due to their comparatively high battery consumption. These innovations made the technology suitable for mass market adoption. In laboratory settings atomic clocks had replaced quartz clocks as the basis for precision measurements of time and frequency, resulting in International Atomic Time.

By the 1980s, quartz technology had taken over applications such as kitchen timers, alarm clocks, bank vault time locks, and time fuzes on munitions, from earlier mechanical balance wheel movements, an upheaval known in watchmaking as the quartz crisis.

Quartz timepieces have dominated the wristwatch and domestic clock market since the 1980s. Because of the high Q factor and low-temperature coefficient of the quartz crystal, they are more accurate than the best mechanical timepieces, and the elimination of all moving parts and significantly lower sensitivity to disturbances from external causes like magnetism and shock makes them more rugged and eliminates the need for periodic maintenance.

Standard 'Watch' or Real-time clock (RTC) crystal units have become cheap mass-produced items on the electronic parts market.

Since the 1980s, radio clocks are available, which use radio signals for their synchronization. Such clocks change automatically from standard time to daylight saving time. As these radio signals are transmitted in most cases in the longwave range, such devices can also work at places where radio reception conditions are poor.

With the proliferation of the Internet, consumer timekeeping devices (e.g. smartphones and smartwatches) may now automatically synchronize their internal clocks via automated protocols (e.g. network time protocol) to atomic clock time servers.

== See also ==
- Automatic quartz
- Crystal oscillator frequencies
- Solar-powered watch
- Electric watch
- Quartz crisis
- Lavet-type stepping motor
- Pierce oscillator
