= Lavet-type stepping motor =

Type of single-phase motor, typically driving a timepiece

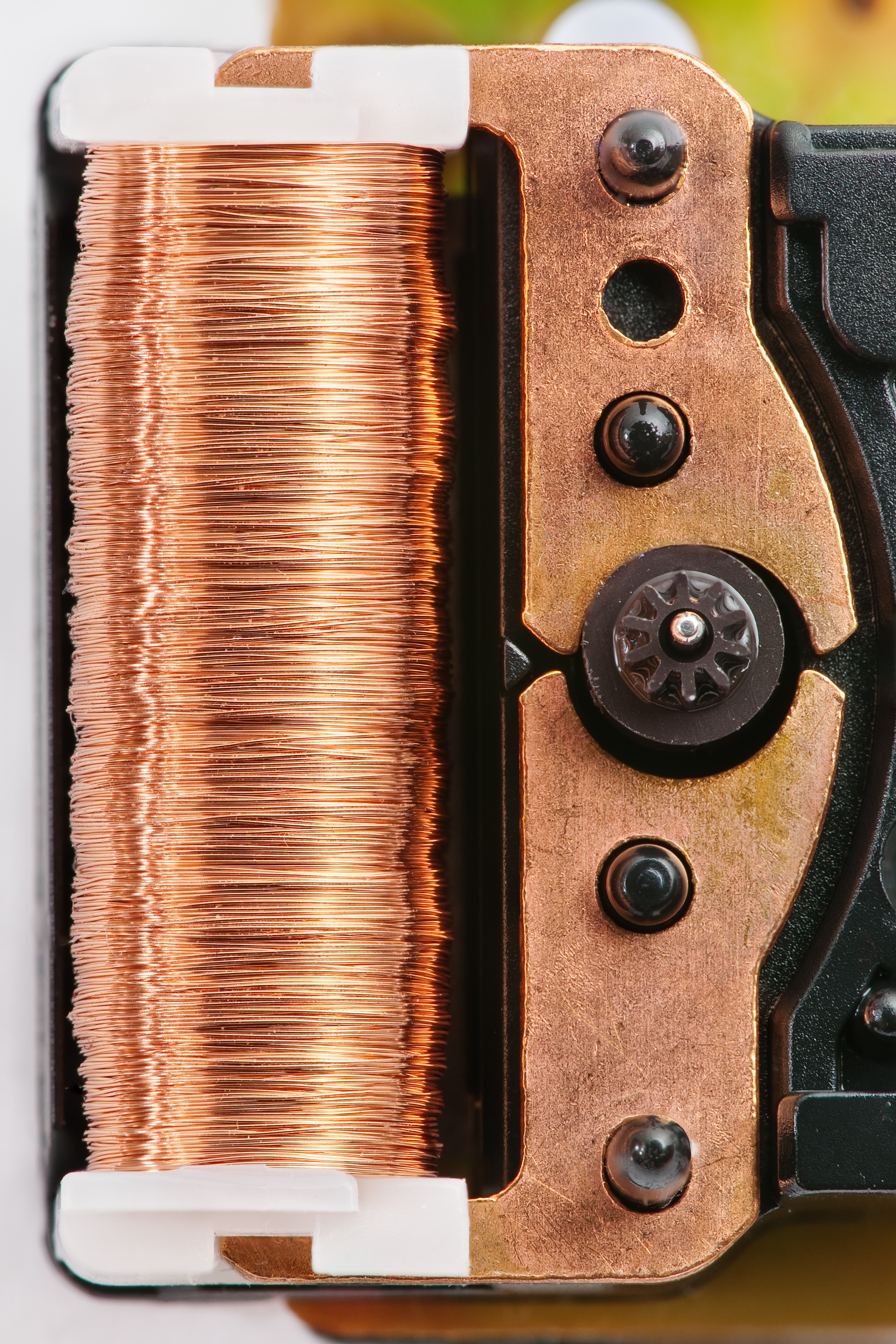
Lavet-type stepping motor of a quartz clock. A black rotor sprocket provides the mechanical output.

The Lavet-type stepping motor has widespread use as a drive in electro-mechanical clocks and is a special kind of single-phase stepping motor. Both analog and stepped-movement quartz clocks use the Lavet-type stepping motor (see Quartz clock). Through miniaturization, it can be used in wristwatches and requires very little power, making a battery last for many years. The French engineer Marius Lavet invented this kind of drive and described it in 1936 in his patent application FR823395.

Like other single-phase motors, the Lavet motor is only able to turn in one direction, which depends on the geometry of its stator. The rotor is a permanent magnet. In a clock, a circuit generates the bipolar pulse train, which alternately delivers a positive and a negative voltage to the coil for short periods (providing a correct mechanical output to move a second hand). The motor can be built with a strong magnet and large stator to deliver high torque, but it is mostly built small, to drive the load through a low gear ratio.

The rotor (circle) is a permanent magnet (with red and green poles). In figure (a) it turns towards the stator (xx' cogging point) so as to minimize reluctance. (It does so by turning away from the small semicircular air gaps.) When the electromagnet is switched on in figure (b) its horizontal magnetic field attracts the rotor's poles (yy' cogging point). This cycle repeats through figures (c) and (d) with the current and magnetic poles reversed.

The stator core looks a lot like one in a shaded-pole motor and defines the rotational direction according to the position of holes, grooves, or shade windings through the stator. However, unlike a shaded-pole motor, the grooves are at backward positions, and the positions where the rotor settles after each cycle are well determined, which is not the case for induction motors in general, where slip and load affect the angle that the rotor turns each cycle.

Essential for the movement of the Lavet motor are the cogging points of the rotor, which differ depending on whether the stator coil is energized or unenergized. The cogging points with no current are caused by reluctant force against a direct magnetic field, rather than retarding the propagation of an alternating magnetic flux, and in practice are the angles where the air volume between the poles of the magnetic rotor and the bulk of the stator is minimised.

Movement of the common two step Lavet motor:

(a) currentless stator, north pole of rotor points to the upper left,
(b) energized stator, rotor moves clockwise, and north pole points to the right afterwards,
(c) after energization of the stator has declined, rotor moves further until north pole points downright,
(d) stator energized in opposite direction, rotor moves clockwise, and north pole points to the left,
(a') after energization of the stator has declined, rotor moves to its initial position (a).

To make a Lavet motor turn, the current through its stator coil must change direction each step (bipolar) followed by an interval without current while the rotor moves to its reluctant position.

Aside from clock drives, there are many variations of Lavet's concept. One example are types of dashboard instruments in cars.

Slow motion video (960 fps to 30 fps, 32-fold) of the motor wheel of a clockwork with modified actuation of the coil (1:1:1:1 duty of the phases N-S polarity, off, S-N polarity, off). Normally the active time of the coil is about 31 milliseconds to save battery energy. This time is chosen so short that the wheel just accelerates but the current through the coil is switched off before the wheel reaches the 0 or 180 degrees position, so the inertia moves it directly further to the reluctant position. To be able to see the 4 stop positions of the motor it is necessary to prolong the phases with switched-on current to about 200 milliseconds.

== Animation ==

Animation of a Lavet-type stepping motor used in an analog quartz clock movement.

== Literature ==
- FR application 823395 "Perfectionnements aux systèmes et appareils de commande électrique à distance, notamment aux moteurs et horloges synchrones" Filing date 28.09.1936, Applicant: Hatot, Inventor: Marius Lavet (language: french).
- US application 4550279 "Step-by-step motor unit" Filing date 07.09.1983, Applicant: Fabriques D'horlogerie De Fontainemelon S.A., Inventor: Eric Klein (explanation of the concept in english).
