= Omega Flightmaster =

The Omega Flightmaster is a vintage hand-wound chronograph made by Omega SA between 1969 and 1972.

The Flightmaster was designed by Frédéric Robert, the creator behind the Geneva diving watchmaker Aquastar.

There were two versions of the Flightmaster. An earlier model that had a 24-hour time register at 9 o'clock instead of the running seconds register. The movements used are the 17 jewel Omega manual wind calibre 911; the 24-hour model used the Omega manual wind calibre 910. This wristwatch is larger than most of its era and measures 43mm wide by 52mm long.

The watch was created for pilots and was marketed by Omega as such. There is evidence that Flightmasters were used by Soviet Cosmonauts.

== See also ==
- Pilot watch
