= Architecture of Switzerland =

The architecture of Switzerland was influenced by its location astride major trade routes, along with diverse architectural traditions of the four national languages. Romans and later Italians brought their monumental and vernacular architecture north over the Alps, meeting the Germanic and German styles coming south and French influences coming east. Additionally, Swiss mercenary service brought architectural elements from other lands back to Switzerland. All the major styles including ancient Roman, Romanesque, Gothic, Renaissance, Baroque, Neoclassical, Art Nouveau, Modern architecture and Post Modern are well represented throughout the country. The founding of the Congrès International d'Architecture Moderne in La Sarraz and the work of Swiss-born modern architects such as Le Corbusier helped spread Modern architecture throughout the world.

The relative isolation of villages in the Alpine foothills, the Alps and the Jura Mountains as well as different languages led to great diversity in the vernacular style. Due to differing traditions, climate and building materials, villages in each region are distinctly different. The Swiss chalet style, which was popular in the 19th century represents only one of a number of traditional designs. Today, due to historic preservation laws and tourism, large and small communities have retained many of their historic core buildings. Since 1972 the Swiss Heritage Society has awarded the Wakker Prize to encourage communities to preserve their architectural heritage.

== Ancient architecture ==
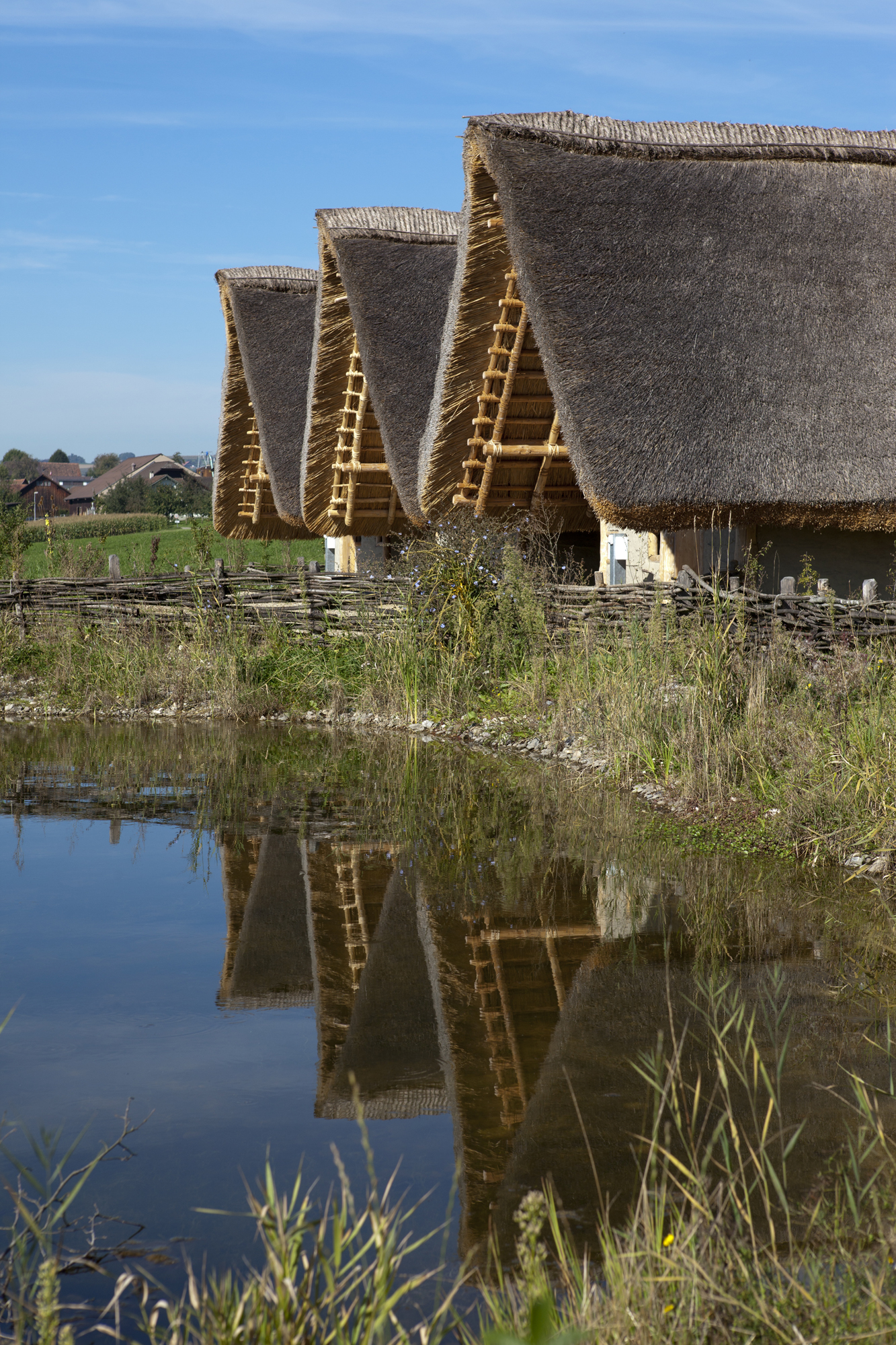
Reconstructed stilt houses at Wauwil

Some of the earliest known buildings in Switzerland were prehistoric stilt houses which were built by the Pfyn, Horgen, Cortaillod and La Tène cultures between 4000 and 500 BC. A number of these early buildings have been rebuilt near the sites where the ruins were discovered.

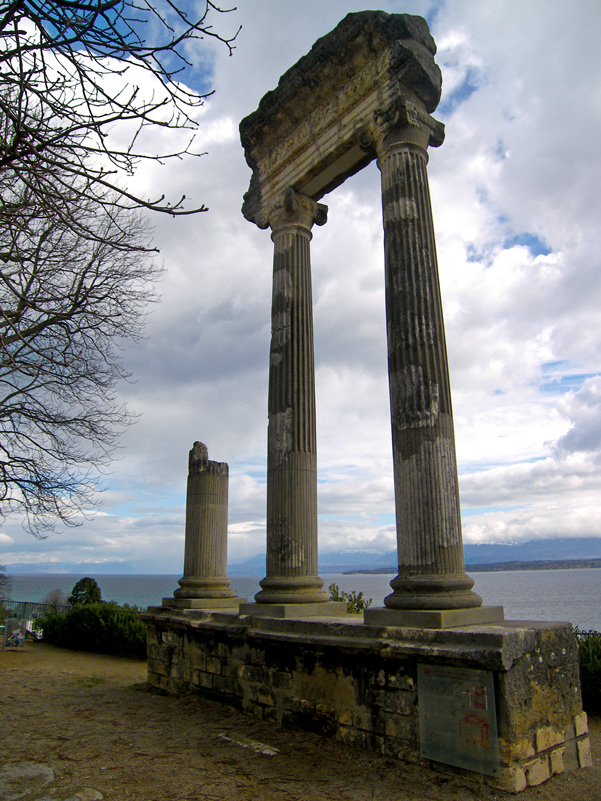
Roman columns at Nyon

Following the defeat of the Helvetii at the Battle of Bibracte of 58 BC, over the next decades much of Switzerland was incorporated into the Roman Empire. The principal Roman settlements in Switzerland were the cities of Iulia Equestris (Nyon), Aventicum (Avenches), Augusta Raurica (Augst) and Vindonissa (Windisch). Evidence has also been found of almost twenty Roman villages (vici) established in the 1st to 3rd century AD, as well as hundreds of villas of varying sizes built in the western and central part of the Swiss Plateau. The Legio XIII Gemina, was based in the permanent camp of Vindonissa (Windisch) and Aventicum (Avenches) was the capital of the Helvetii.

Under pressure from internal and external forces, the Roman Army retreated and Switzerland became a border province in the 4th century. Nyon and Augusta Raurica were permanently abandoned during the 4th century, the stones of their ruins serving to fortify Geneva and Basel. Aventicum never recovered from its pillages: Ammianus Marcellinus noted in around 360 that "the city was once very illustrious, as its half-ruined buildings attest."

There are a number of excavated or rebuilt Roman sites in Switzerland. Some of the ruins of Roman settlements were later incorporated into houses, churches and city walls. All four of the major Roman cities have some relics of the Roman era. Augusta Raurica has parts of the amphitheater, aqueduct, the main forum and a theater. At Avenches the eastern gates and a tower, a thermal bath, the 16,000 seat amphitheater and temple ruins are still visible. At Nyon, the Roman ruins were lost until their rediscovery in the 18th century, which included the amphitheater and basilica. At Windisch the legionaries camp, an amphitheater and an aqueduct are all visible.

Ancient indigenous architecture includes rock shelters called "splüi", grotti and other anonymous architecture using rock.

== Pre-Romanesque ==
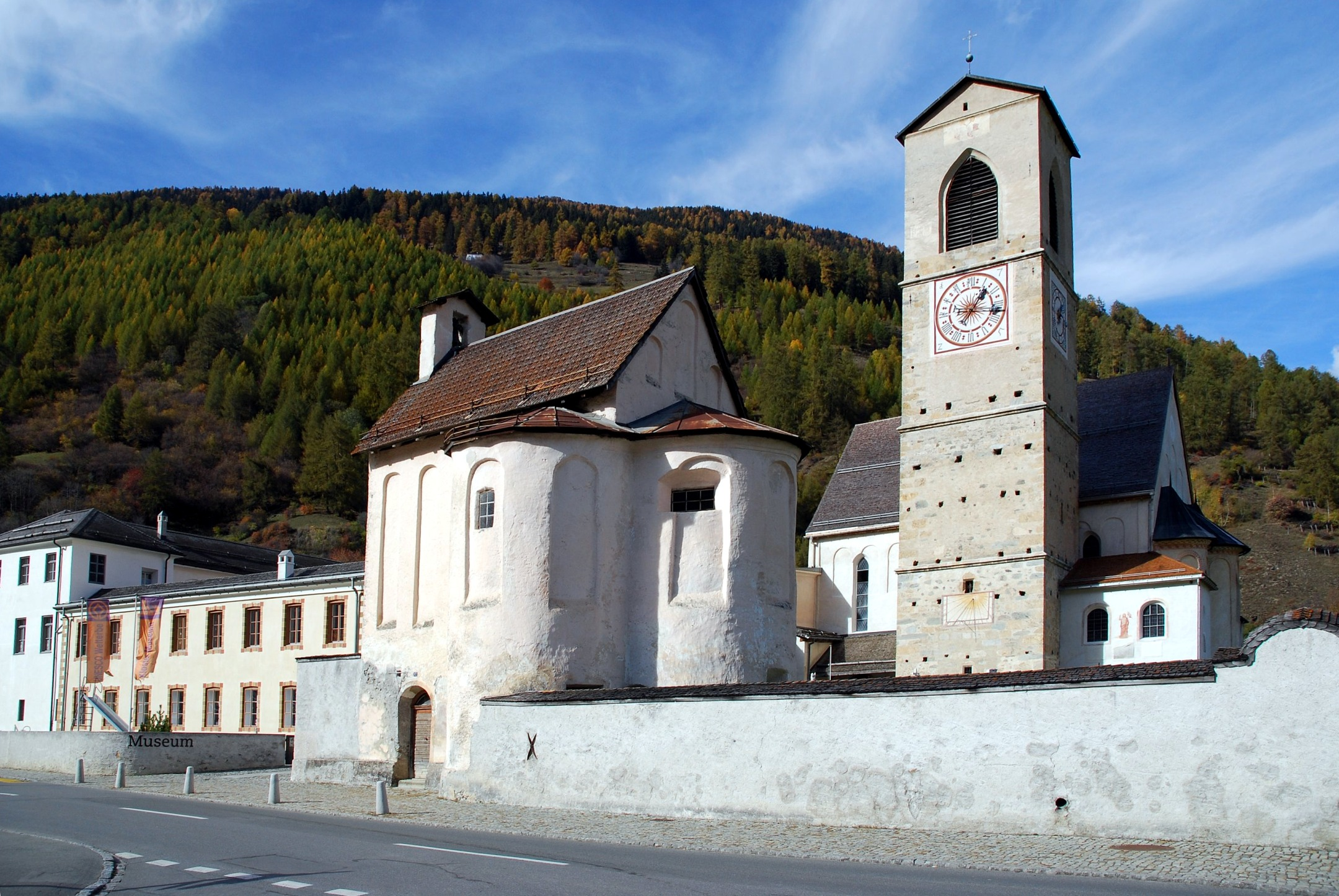
The Saint John Abbey

The Pre-Romanesque period is considered to stretch from the emergence of the Merovingian kingdom in about 500 to the beginning of the 11th century Romanesque period, though there is considerable overlap. During the early centuries of this period, the area that would become Switzerland was sparsely populated and almost nothing remains of any buildings from the period between 500 and the late 8th century. During the Carolingian Renaissance of the 8th and 9th centuries, many new monasteries and churches sprung up across Western Europe. Carolingian architecture borrowed heavily from Early Christian and Byzantine architecture and helped lead to the Romanesque style in the following centuries. To begin expanding their power into the deep forests and isolated mountain valleys, the Carolingian kings established several monasteries in Switzerland.

One well preserved example of this style in Switzerland is Saint John Abbey, a UNESCO World Heritage Site, which was probably founded around 775 either on orders of Charlemagne or his Bishop in Chur. Many of the frescoes in the chapel are from the first half of the 9th century. Another well known example of Carolingian architecture is the World Heritage Site Abbey of St. Gall which, while it was rebuilt in the Baroque style between 1755 and 1768, is based on the much older Carolingian monastery. The Abbey library of Saint Gall contains around 2,100 manuscripts from the 8th to the 15th centuries including the Plan of St. Gall, the only surviving major architectural drawing from the 6th to the 13th centuries. The Plan is a drawing of a proposed, but never built, Benedictine monastery.

== Romanesque architecture ==
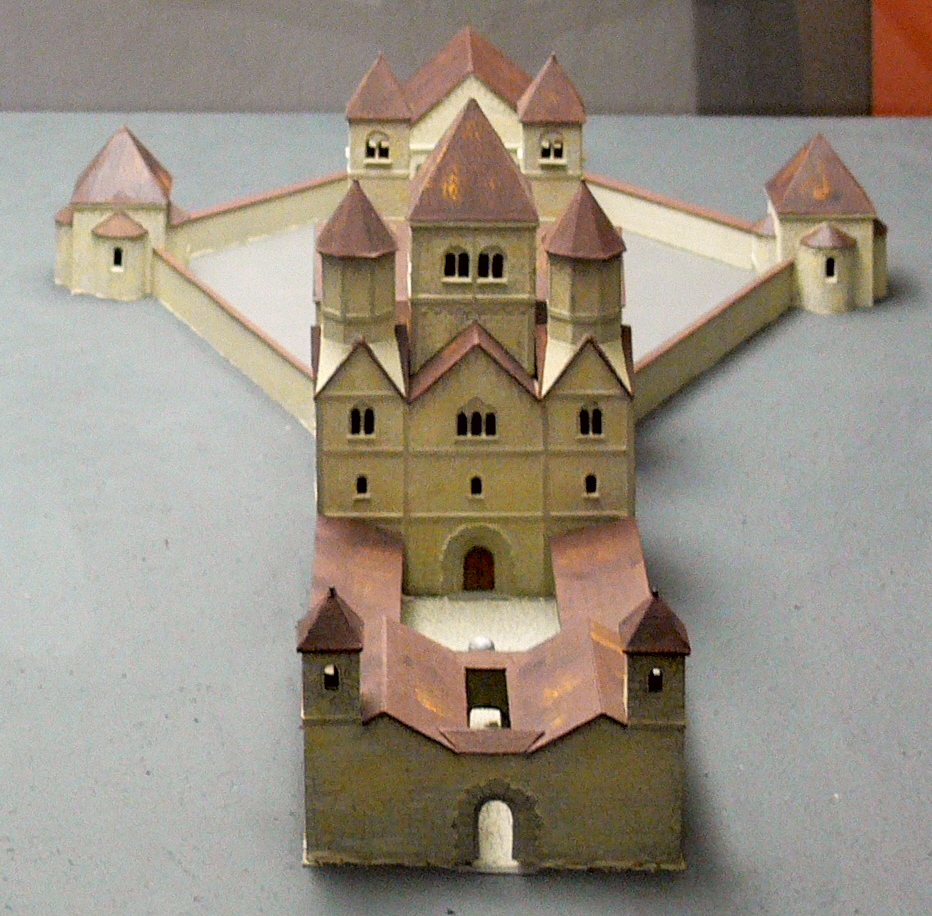
Model of the first church at Schaffhausen

Some of the defining characteristics of Romanesque architecture is solid walls with few, small, semi-circular, paired windows, groin vaults and in religious architecture rows of columns that separate the nave from the aisles. In the 11th and 12th centuries, architecture in Switzerland can be roughly divided into three zones of influence, the Lombards in the south, Burgundy in the west and Germanic in the north and east, though there is significant overlap. The Lombard and Burgundian craftsmen experimented with barrel and groined vaults and carved capitals and friezes. In the Germanic parts of Europe, the ecclesiastical Romanesque style often included an apse on both the eastern and western ends of the nave, such as was shown in the Plan of St. Gall. The western apse was often flanked by two symmetrical, square towers which may include a westwork.

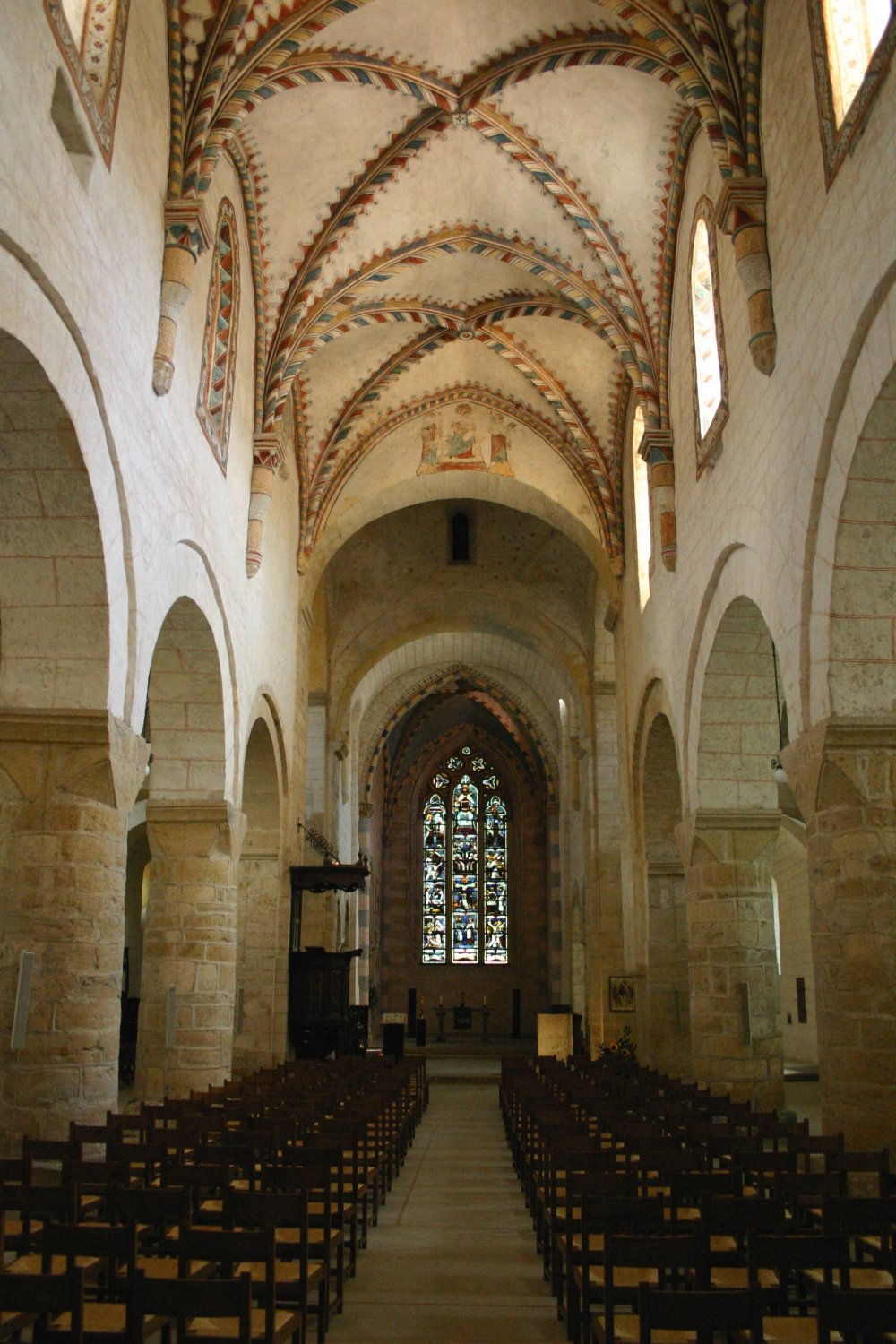
Interior of Romainmôtier Priory church showing the Romanesque massive pillars and groined arches.

When the Cluniac reforms spread through Switzerland in the late 10th and 11th centuries, it triggered a wave of church and monastery construction. All five Bishops in the area (Basel, Chur, Geneva, Lausanne and Sion) built Romanesque cathedrals, which included a full range of Romanesque and later Gothic elements. Romainmôtier Priory and Payerne Priory were both daughter houses of Cluny and were built in the Cluniac inspired Romanesque style. Romainmôtier was built by Lombard trained craftsmen by Odilo of Cluny around the end of the 10th century and has remained generally unchanged since then. The central nave features pillars with simply carved capitals and a groined ceiling.

The cathedrals at Basel and Constance and the monasteries at Schaffhausen and Einsiedeln were all built with two symmetric square towers flanking the main portal like Cluny. Though all four of these examples were later rebuilt in other styles, the Romanesque floor plan is generally still visible. The Grossmünster in Zurich also shows Lombard elements despite being firmly in the Germanic zone.

In addition to church and monastery construction, a number of Romanesque forts and castles were built throughout the country side. In German Switzerland wooden forts were replaced by stone towers, though in the French and Italian areas stone castles had remained common since the Roman era. These new castles featured a large, multi-story tower with thick, heavy walls. The central tower was then surrounded by a ring wall with towers and a gate house. As long-distance trade increased, the castles were placed along rivers and mountain passes to collect tolls and regulate movement. The Counts of Savoy built castles with square ring walls and towers on the corners such as Grandson and Yverdon. The Counts of Zähringen built large donjon like residence towers such as Thun Castle. The Counts of Kyburg built their castles with massive stones, visible in Kyburg Castle.

== Gothic architecture ==
Originating in 12th-century France and lasting into the 16th century, its characteristics include the pointed arch, the ribbed vault (which evolved from the joint vaulting of Romanesque architecture) and the flying buttress. Today, the style is known mainly from numerous Gothic churches and cathedrals scattered across Europe. In Switzerland many Romanesque churches and monasteries were built in the bishop's seat or were supported by the bishops. In contrast, Gothic churches were often built in growing towns and cities as a symbol of their wealth and power. The newly founded mendicant orders built Gothic churches, plague houses and hospitals for much the same reason. By the late Gothic era a number of smaller Gothic parish churches were being built across the country.

The style spread quickly into French-speaking Switzerland with the construction of Lausanne Cathedral beginning around 1170–90. The rose window (1210) and the statue decorated portal (1230), had come from France and in the following centuries would be widely copied throughout Switzerland. Around 1215, the Gothic upper part of Geneva's Cathedral was completed on the Romanesque lower part. From there Gothic spread gradually throughout the region driven by trade and the growing wealth of the mendicant orders. Between 1270 and the 14th century the Franciscans built Gothic churches or monasteries in Lucerne, Fribourg and Basel, the Dominican Order built two in Basel along with complexes in Bern, Zurich and at Königsfelden Monastery and the Augustinians built one in Fribourg.

As the population grew during the 13th to 16th century, a number of new parishes were established. For example, around Zurich in the period between 1470 and 1525 over half of the approximately 100 parishes had a new Gothic church. Many of these new churches included a polygonal choir, lit with large windows and topped with a ribbed roof. The basilica nave had smooth walls and was topped with a flat roof. Many of these new parish churches included rich stained glass windows, some of which are still in place today. A French trained school of fresco painters developed in Waltensburg/Vuorz and decorated churches throughout Graubünden with Gothic frescos.

After the 1356 Basel earthquake, the damaged choir of Basel's cathedral was rebuilt in a Gothic Rayonnant style. The towers and west façade were rebuilt in Gothic style during the 15th century. In 1421 construction began on the Bern Minster, one of the most important late-Gothic buildings in Switzerland. Its size and ornate design were a testament to the growing wealth and power of the new city-state. Throughout Zurich, Graubünden and Valais a number of new Gothic parish churches sprung up throughout the 15th and 16th centuries. However, in Inner Switzerland, the only new construction was the parish church of St. Oswald in Zug.

In contrast to the ornate and distinctive Gothic churches, Gothic secular buildings tended to be understated and include only a few Gothic elements. Wealthy traders and patricians built houses with pointed arch windows or other Gothic decorations. The city halls of newly powerful cities such as Bern, Fribourg and Basel include a few Gothic elements (the ceiling in Bern, the star-ribbed vaulting in Fribourg) but lack a unified motif.

Gothic buildings in Switzerland
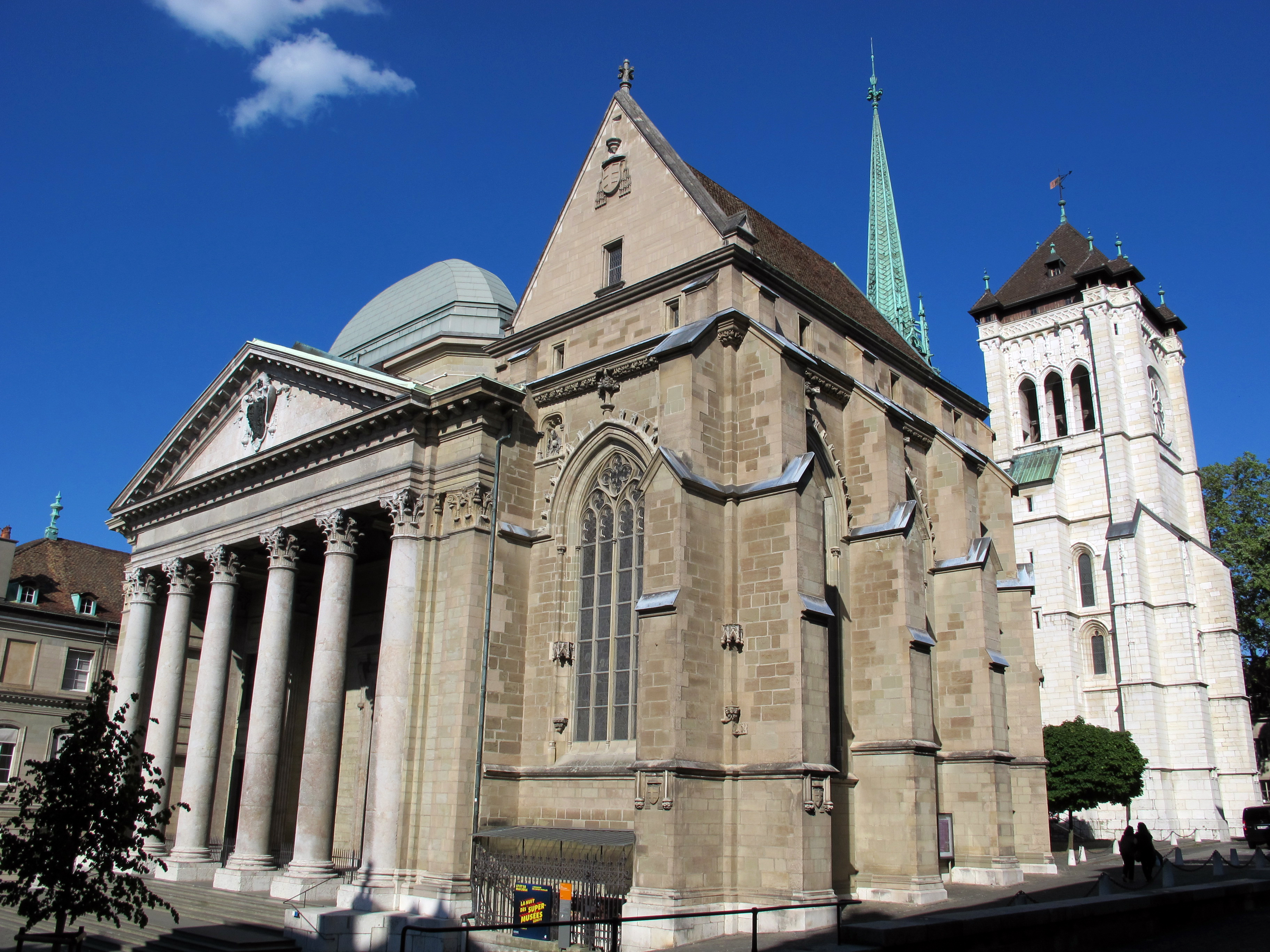
Geneva's Cathedral, Romanesque tower (right), Gothic hall (center), Neo-Classical façade (left)

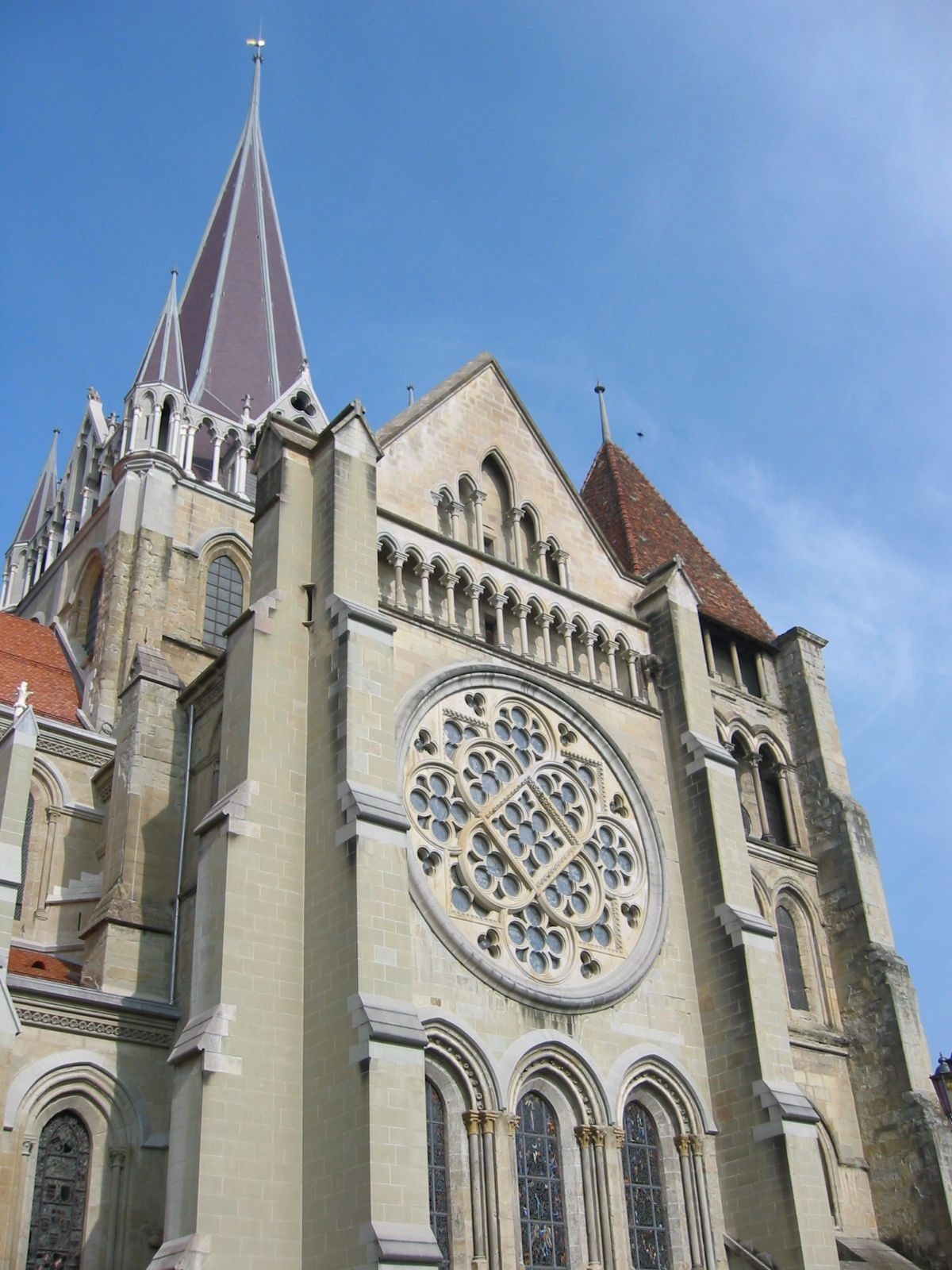
Early Gothic Lausanne Cathedral

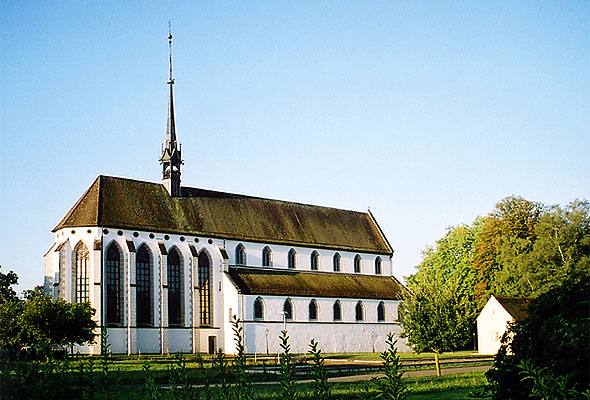
Königsfelden Monastery church

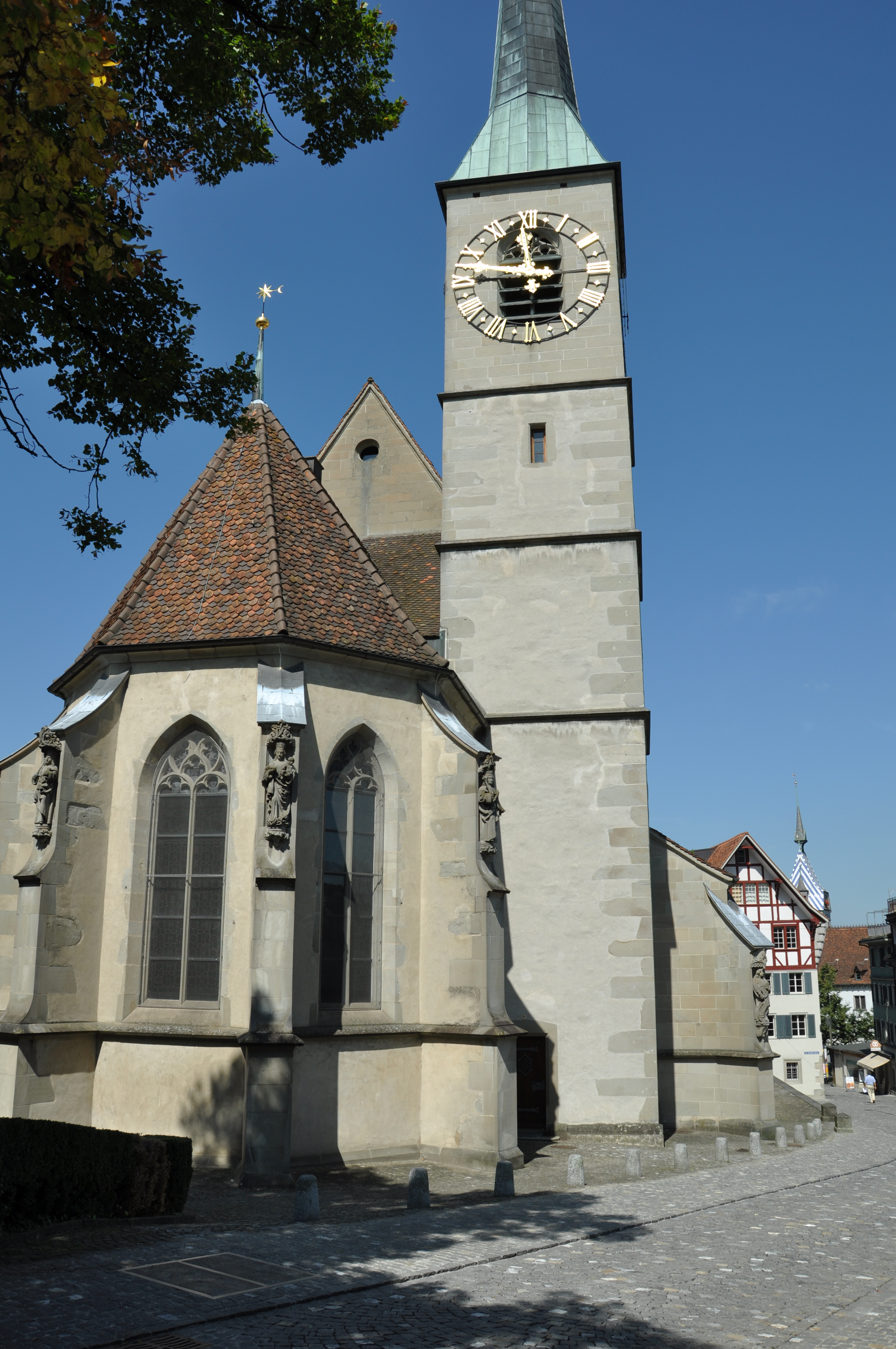
St. Oswald in Zug

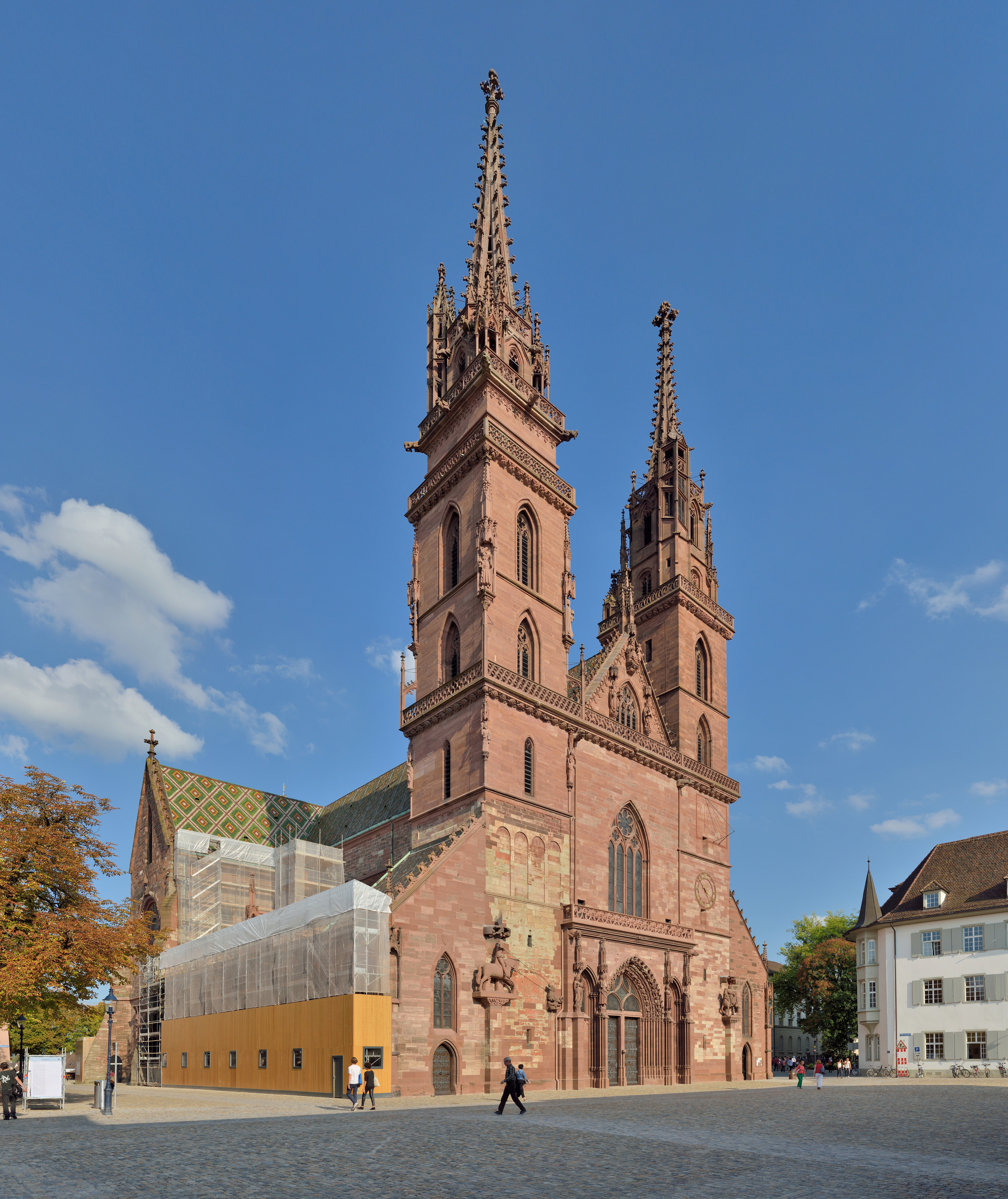
Basel Minster, gothic west façade and towers

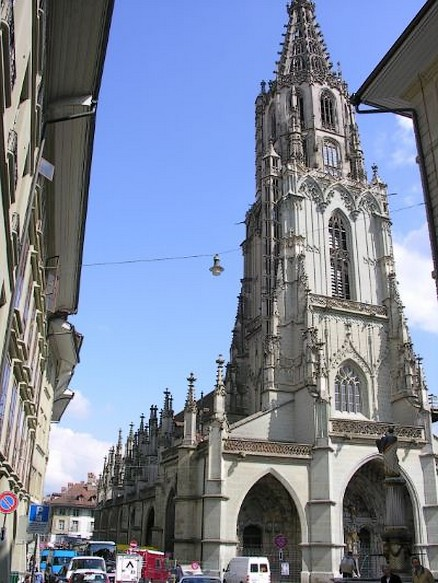
Late Gothic Minster at Bern

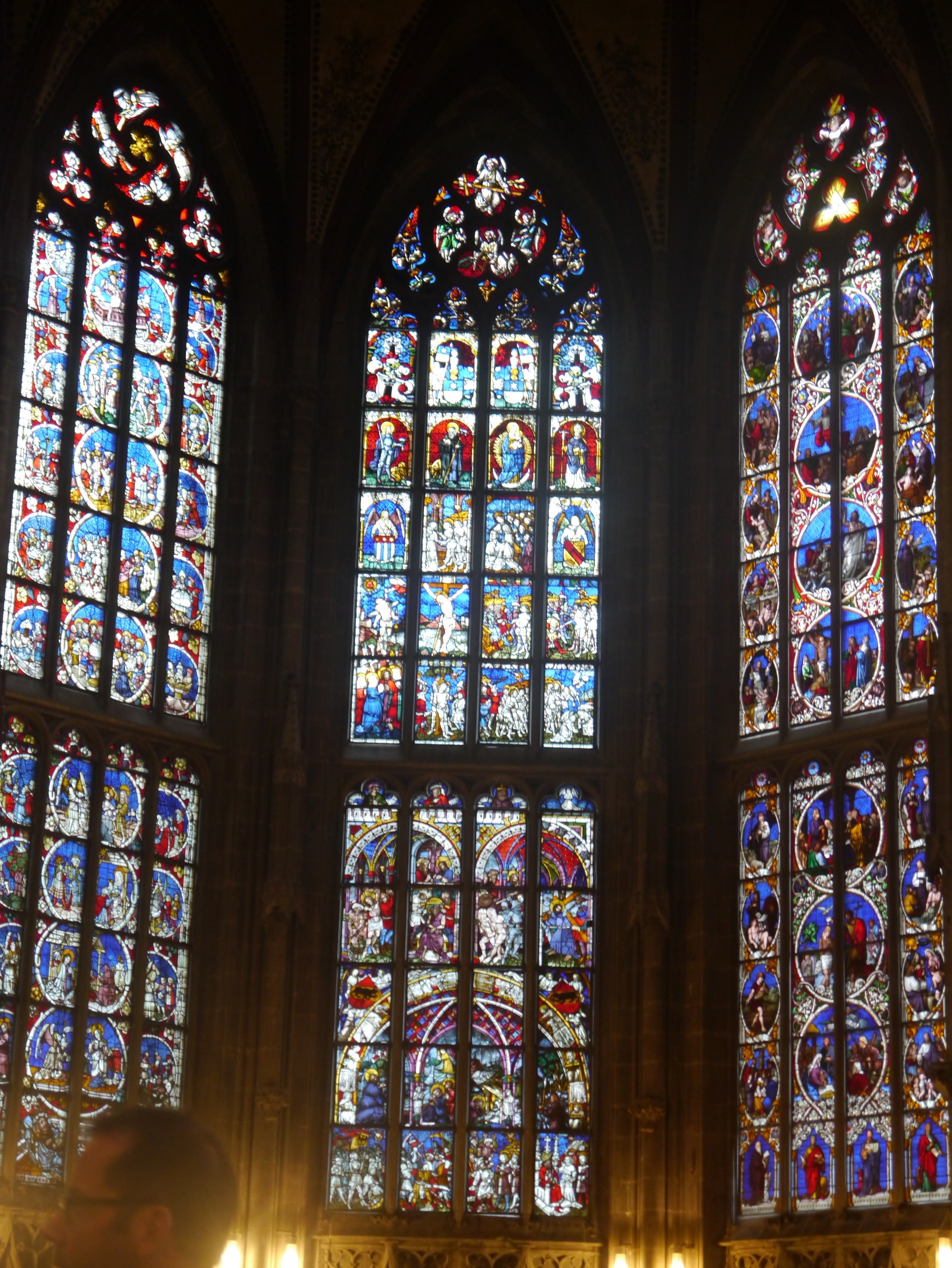
Gothic stained glass in the choir of the Bern Minster

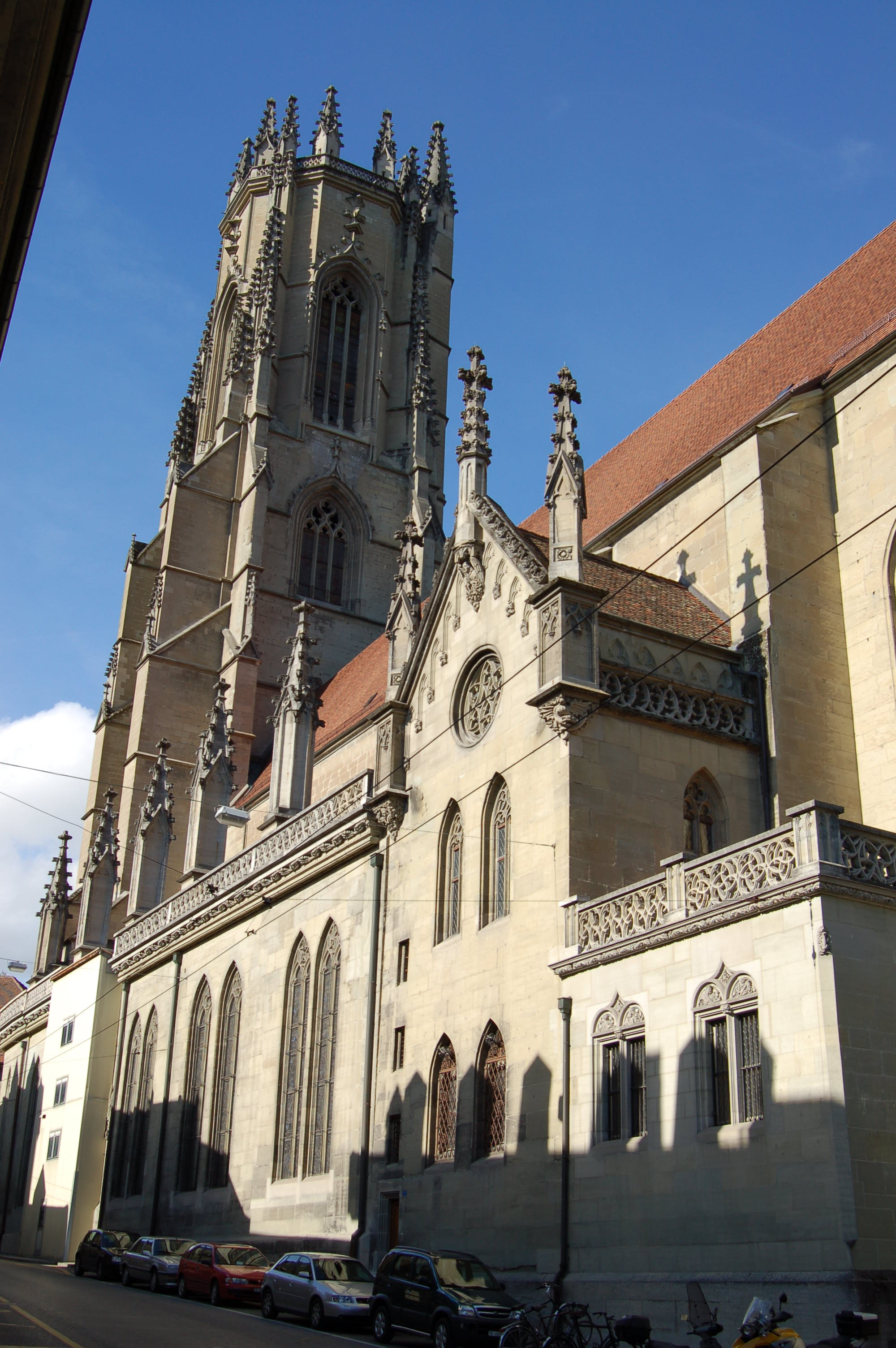
Late Gothic Fribourg Cathedral

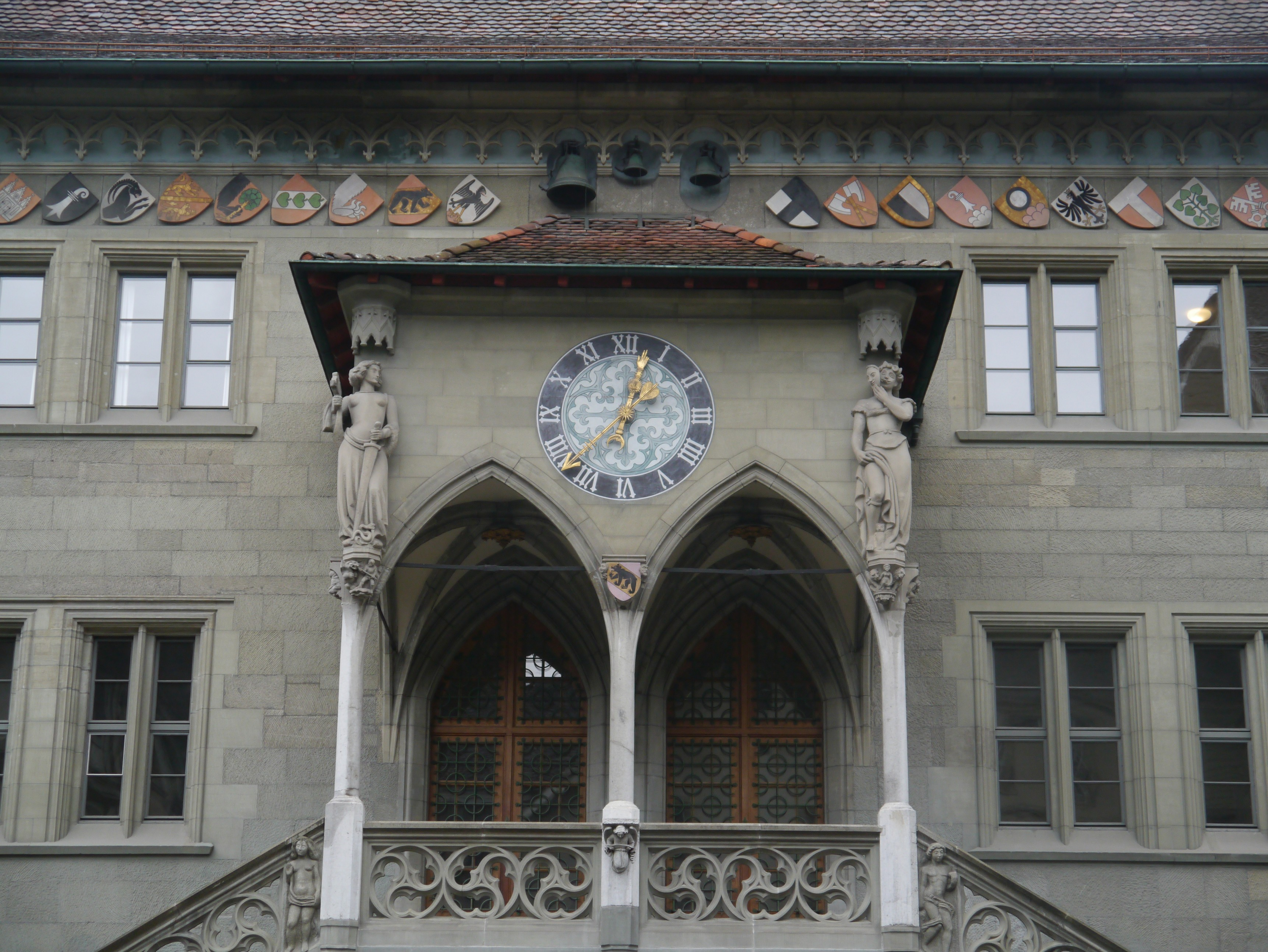
Gothic elements on the staircase of Bern's city council building

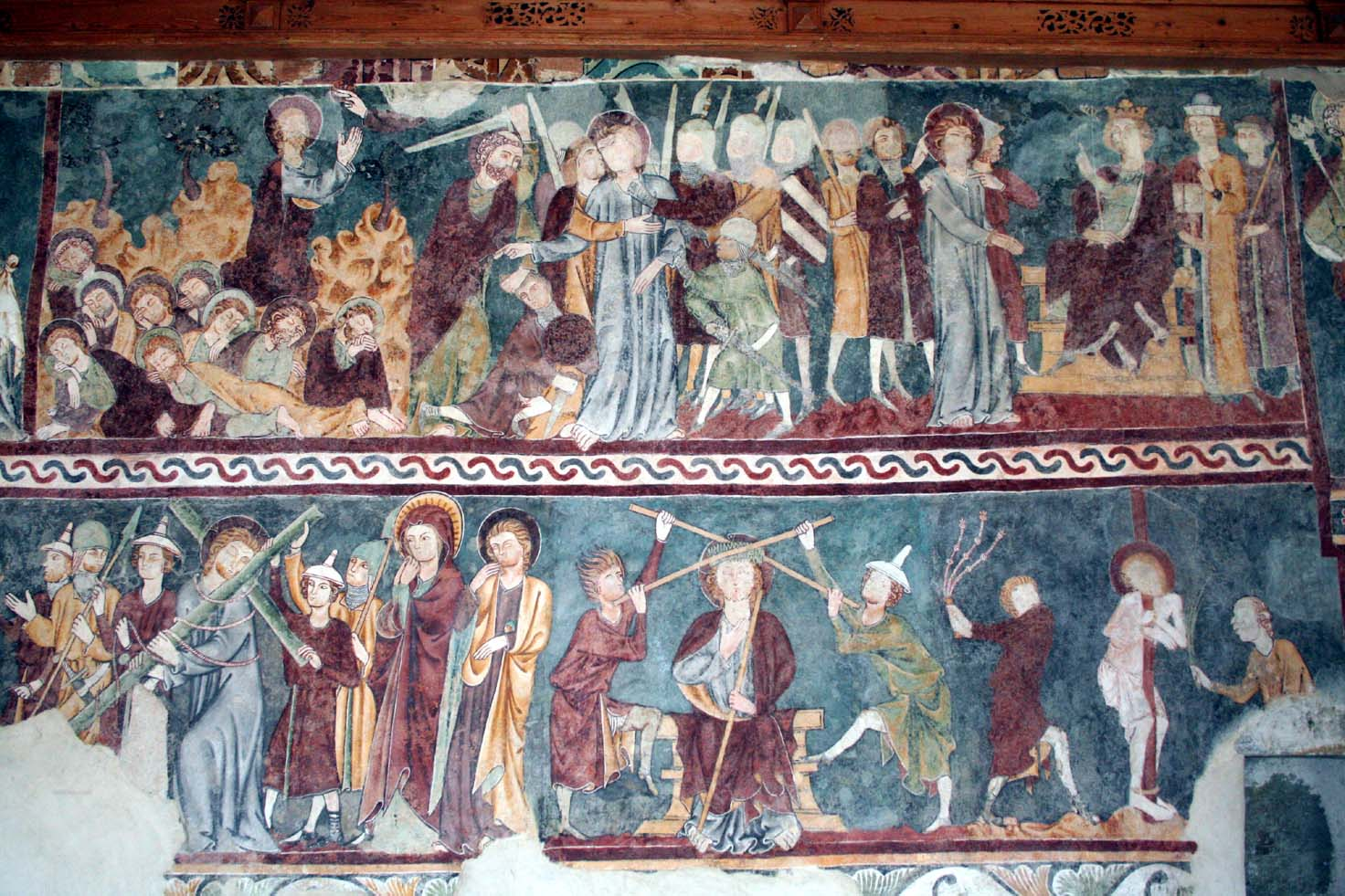
Frescos in Waltensburg/Vuorz

== Renaissance architecture ==
The Renaissance style spread into Switzerland around the 16th century, reaching Ticino earlier than the rest of Switzerland. Renaissance style places emphasis on symmetry, proportion, geometry and the regularity of parts as they are demonstrated in the architecture of classical antiquity and in particular ancient Roman architecture, of which many examples remained. Orderly arrangements of columns, pilasters and lintels, as well as the use of semicircular arches, hemispherical domes, niches and aediculae replaced the more complex proportional systems and irregular profiles of Gothic buildings.

As the Renaissance spread north from Italy, many churches in Ticino were decorated or rebuilt in the new style. In 1517, the Cathedral of Saint Lawrence in Lugano was rebuilt with a massive Renaissance façade. The façade of the Church of Pietro e Stefano in Bellinzona was begun in the Renaissance style, but completed in Baroque. A third major Renaissance work in Ticino is the church of S. Croce in Riva San Vitale. S. Croce was built in the late 16th Century and could be argued to represent either the late Renaissance or early Baroque.

North of the Alps, mostly secular buildings were built in the Renaissance style. The first Renaissance buildings were in Basel in 1556, but were built by master craftsmen from Ticino. This was followed by the Ritter'sche Palast and town hall in Lucerne and a town hall in Zurich. The Munot in Schaffhausen and the fortifications near Bellinzona are the only two large Renaissance structures in Switzerland. The Munot was built in 1564–1589 on a design of Albrecht Dürer, while the fortifications were built in the 15th century by Milan to defend against the Swiss and were later used by the Swiss to defend against Milan.

Renaissance buildings in Switzerland
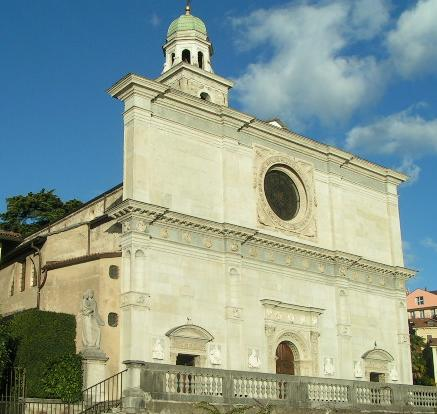
Façade of Lugano Cathedral

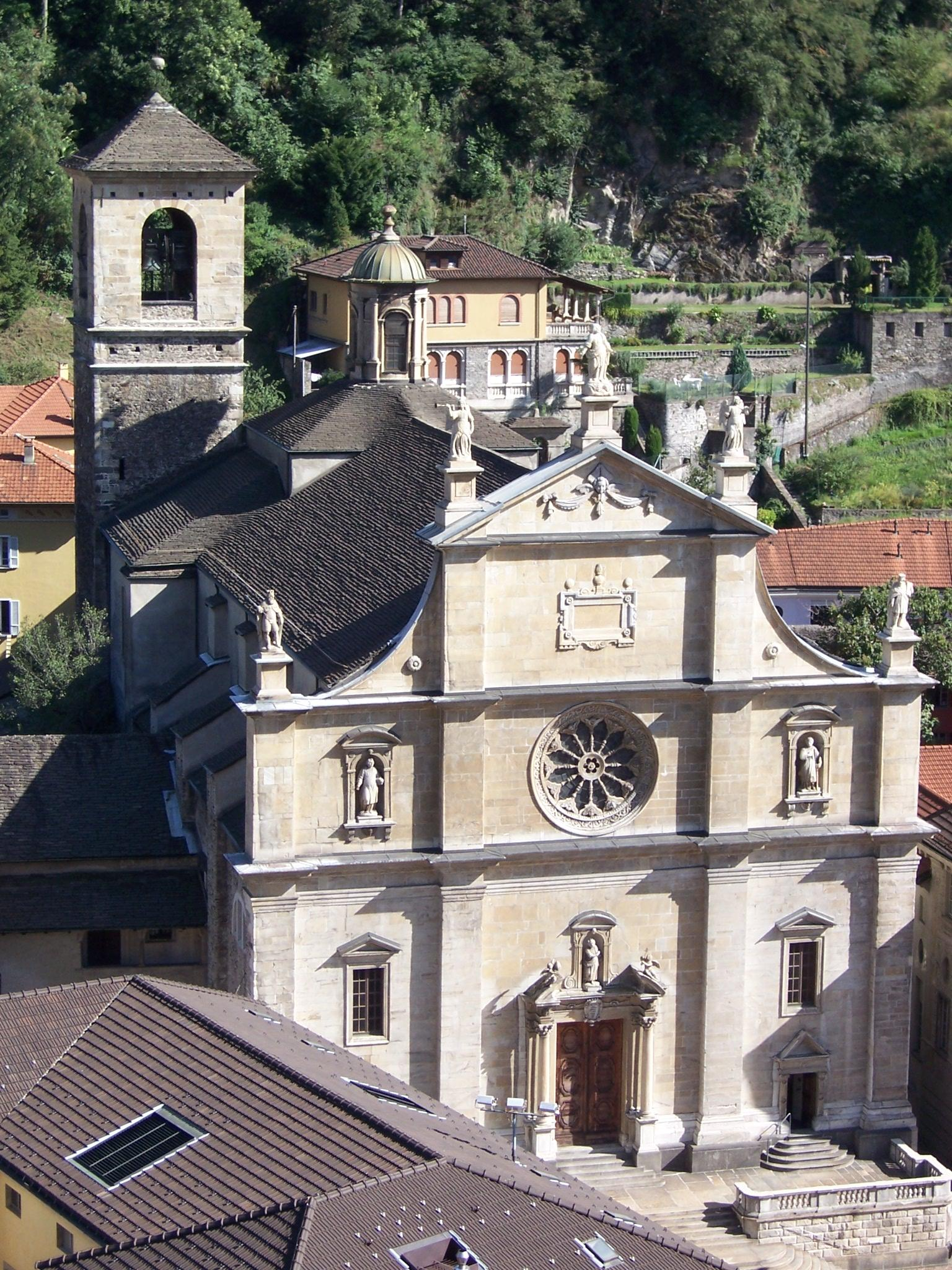
The façade of Pietro e Stefano in Bellinzona shows a Renaissance lower with Baroque upper sections.

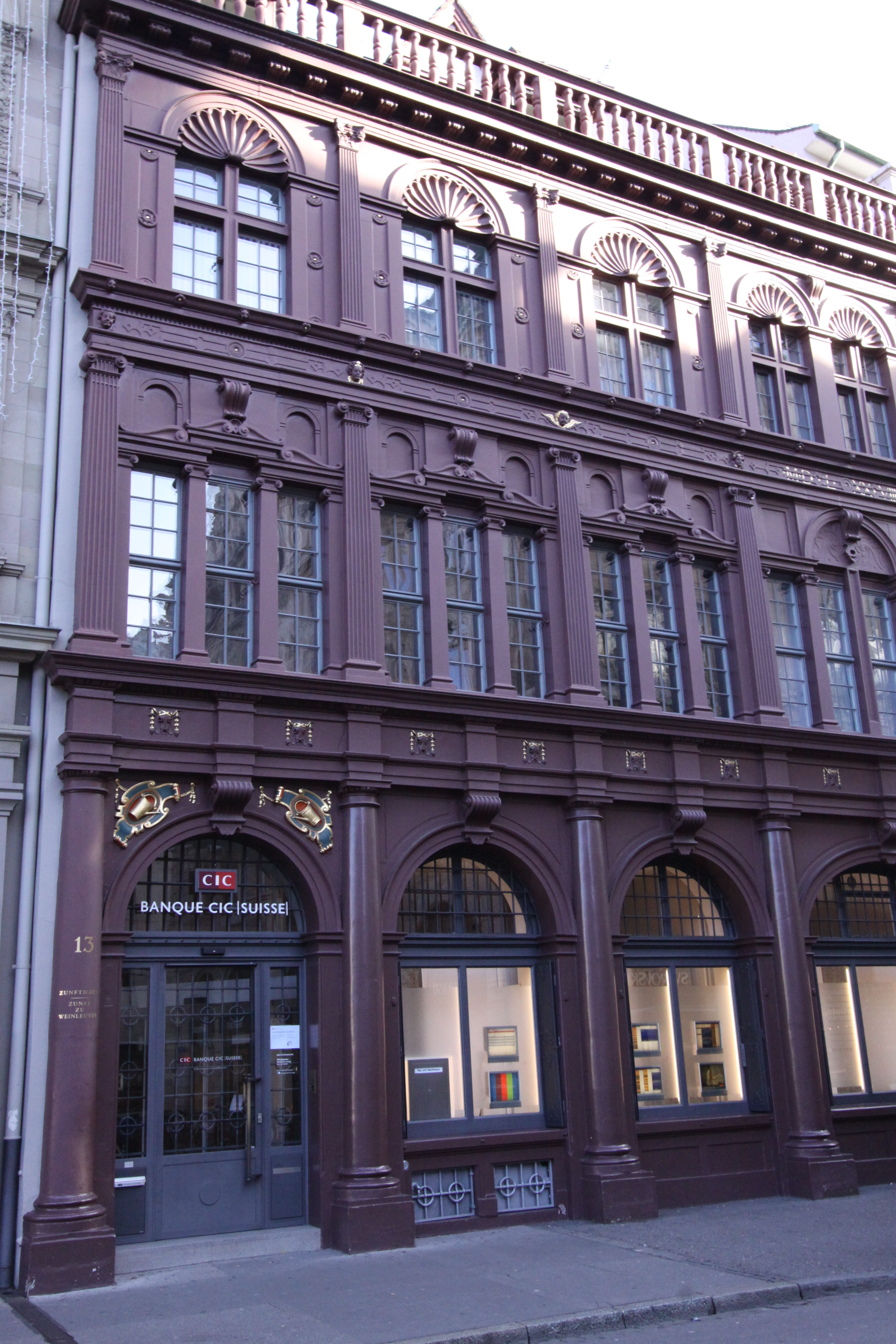
Geltenzunft (Winemaker's guild) building in Basel

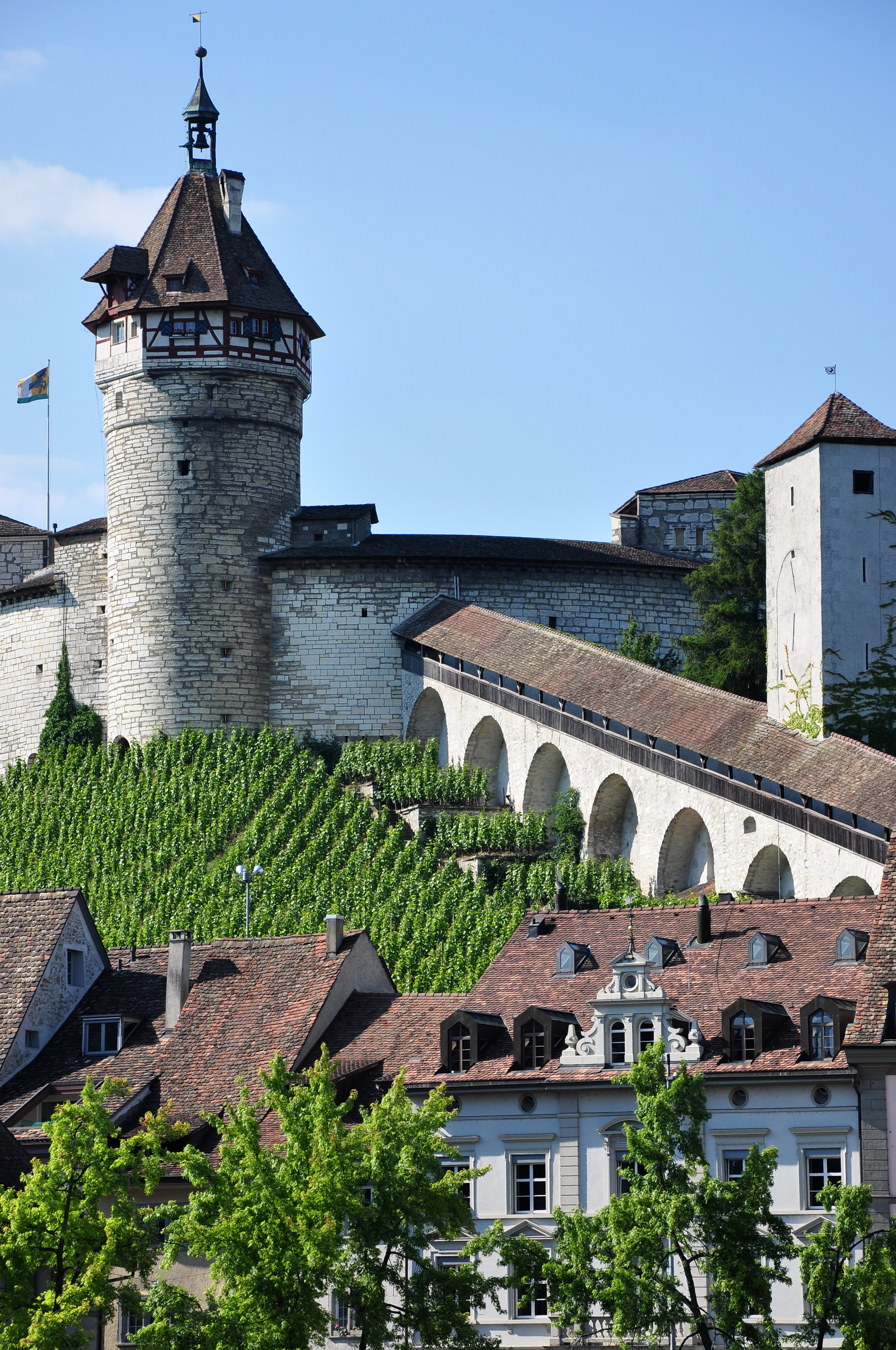
Munot fortification in Schaffhausen

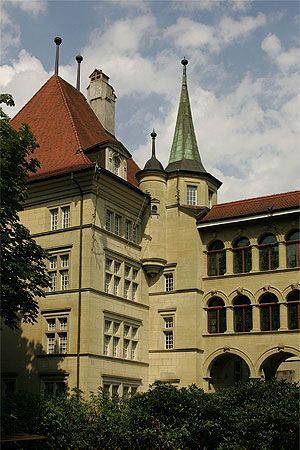
Ratzé Castle in Fribourg (now the Musée d'art et d'histoire)

== Baroque architecture ==
Baroque was a reaction to the changes of the Counter-Reformation within the Catholic Church, and often followed the expansion of the new reform orders, the Jesuits and the Capuchins. It first entered Switzerland from Italy in the Graubünden following the destruction of the Thirty Years' War. Some of the features of the style included broader naves and oval shapes in churches, pear shaped domes, fragmentary architectural elements, dramatic use of light, rich colors and ornaments, large ceiling frescoes, trompe-l'œil illusions and a façade that often included a dramatic projection. By the mid to late 17th century, there were a number of master craftsmen families from Roveredo, San Vittore and surrounding communities in Graubünden, who led construction projects throughout Europe.

To help repair the damage of the Bundner Wirren and the Thirty Years' War, Graubünden craftsmen built numerous Capuchin hospices throughout the Canton before spreading out throughout Switzerland. New parish churches, monasteries, pilgrimage churches, chapels and roadside shrines were built across the country by both local and foreign craftsmen. In addition to religious buildings, hundreds of country manors and city houses along with town halls, hospitals, granaries and fortifications were all built in the new style.

Since a key part of the Baroque style was the use of colors, realistic paintings and frescos and statues, many projects now included specialized artists who finished the exterior and interior as part of construction. Both local and foreign artists were active in Switzerland leading to rapidly spreading ideas. North of the Alps, each area had local families who specialized as sculptors, plaster workers and wood carvers. As they learned of the new style they incorporated its aesthetics into the numerous new churches. In the early 17th century, artists from Ticino began to travel to Rome to learn the Baroque style of painting. Some of them, such as Giovanni Serodine from Ascona and Pier Francesco Mola from Coldrerio, remained in Rome, while others returned to Ticino to work. As the Baroque style spread, it was taken up by artists north of the Alps as well.

Some of the most notable examples of Baroque include the church at Arlesheim, the Jesuit Church in Lucerne, Pfäfers Abbey, Disentis Abbey, Rheinau Abbey, Einsiedeln Abbey and the Abbey of Saint Gall.

Baroque buildings in Switzerland
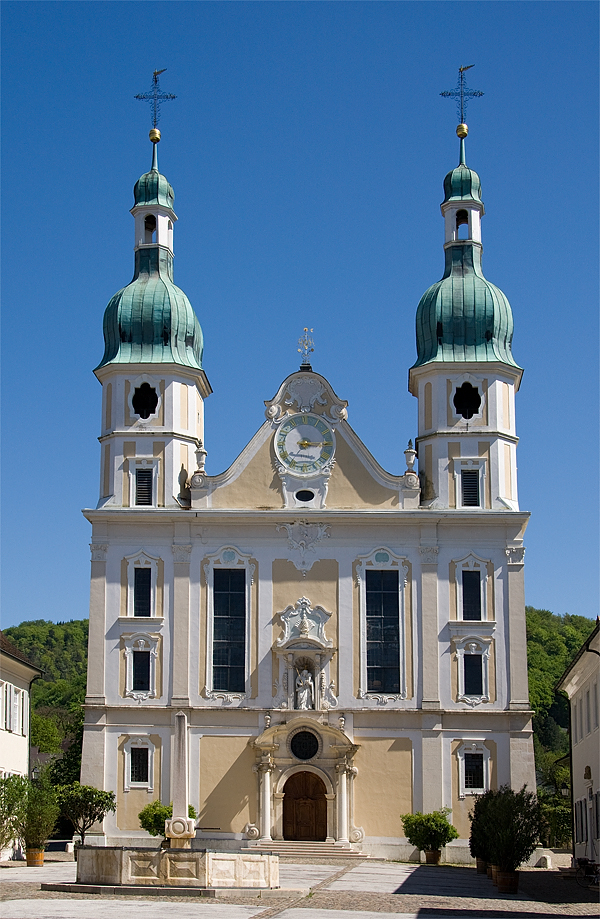
Arlesheim Church

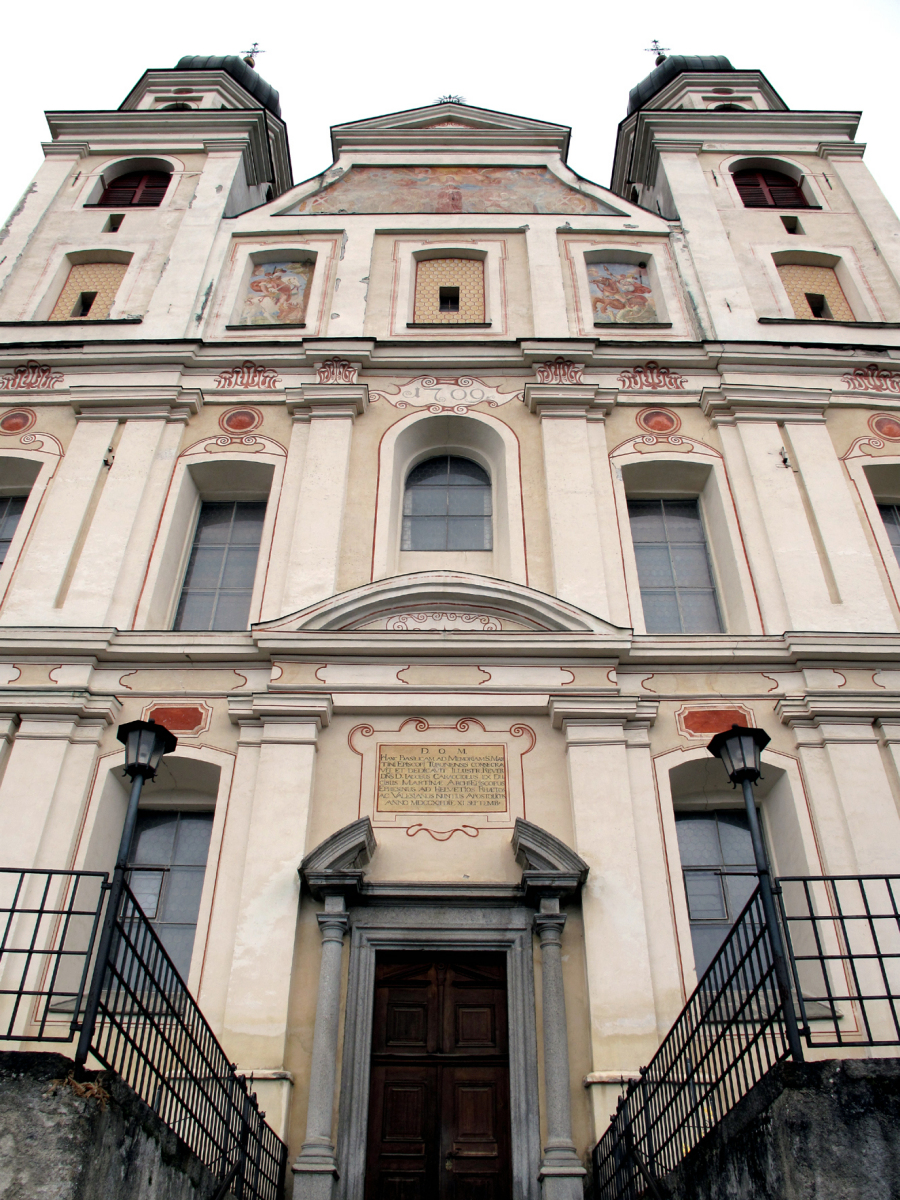
Facade of Disentis Abbey

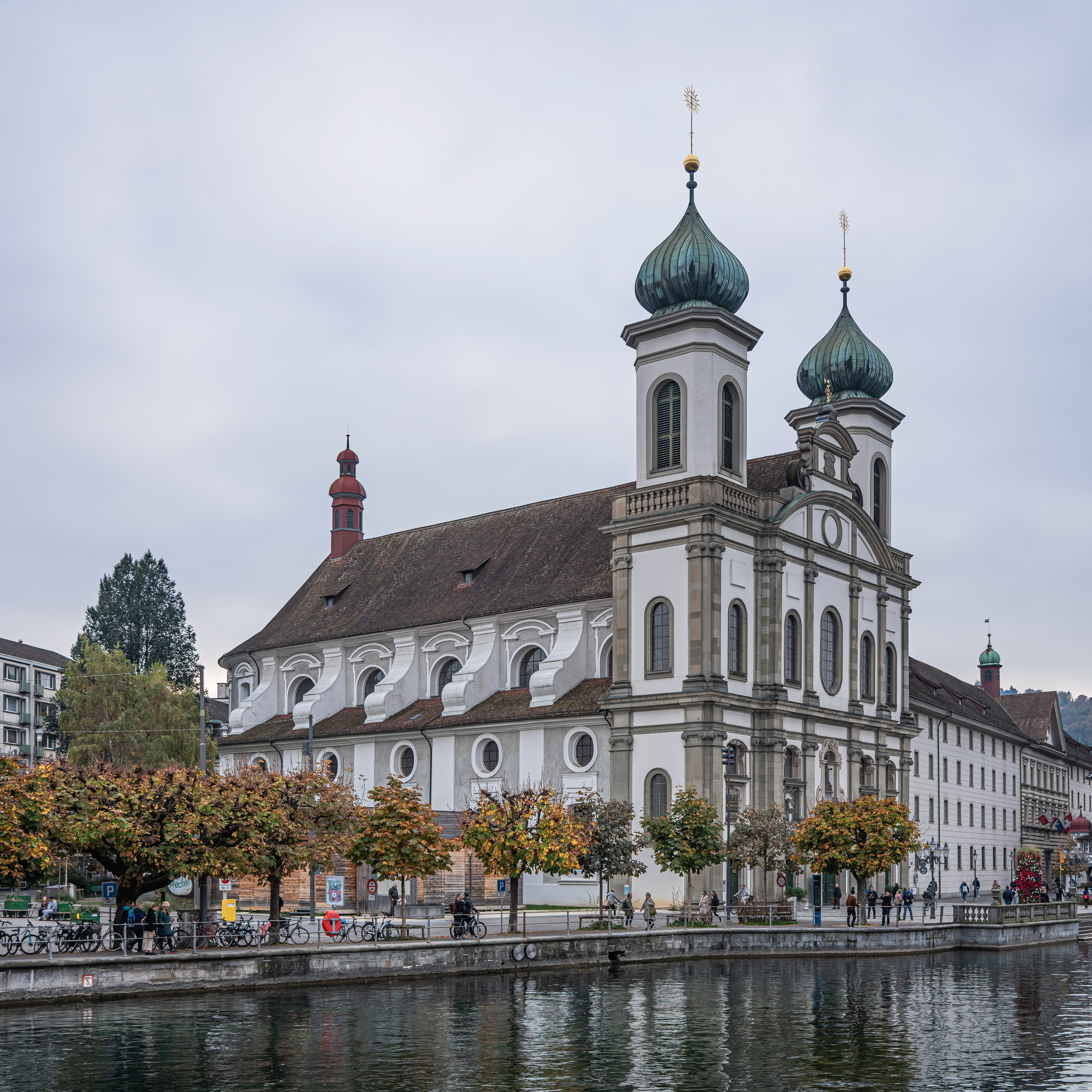
The Jesuit Church in Lucerne's old town

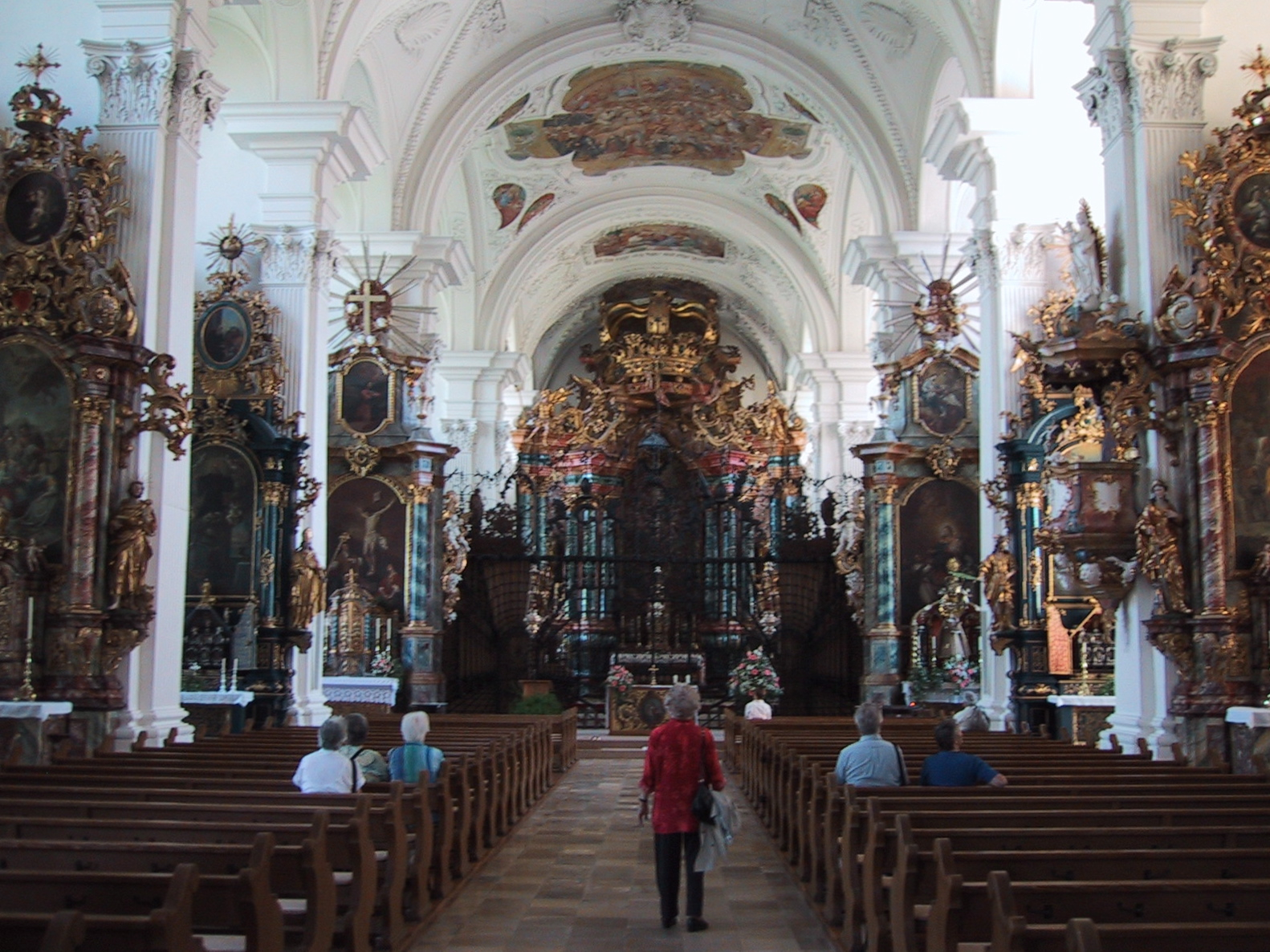
Interior of Rheinau Abbey

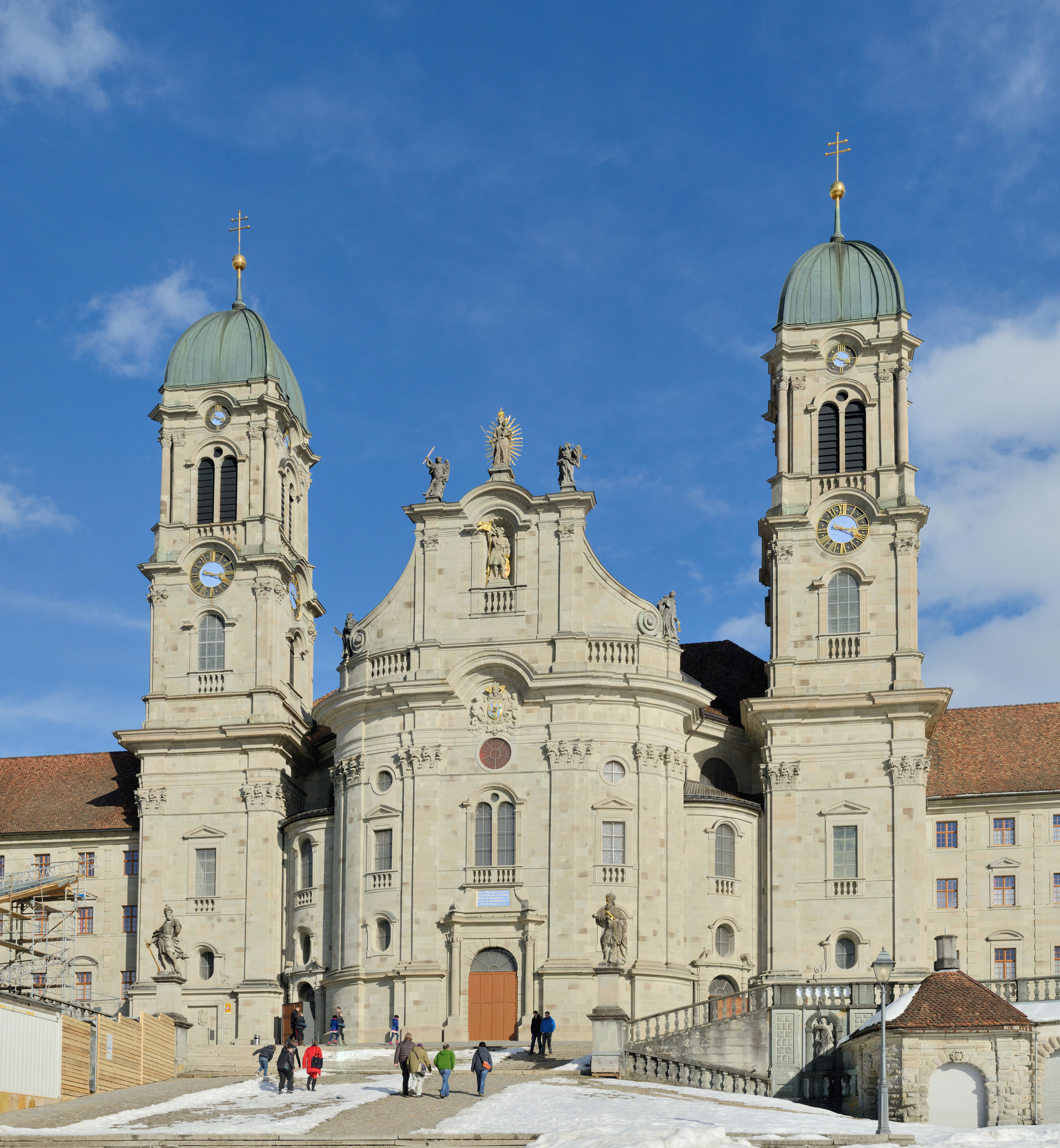
Einsiedeln Abbey

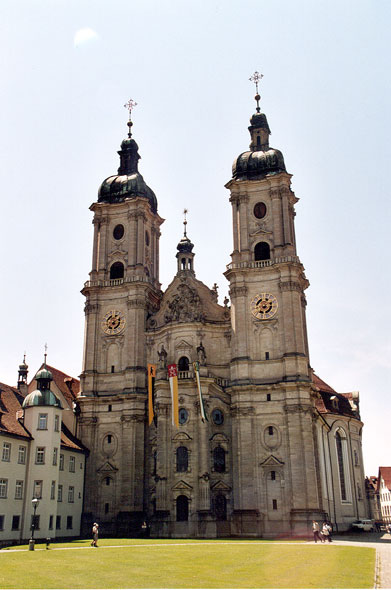
Abbey of St. Gall

== Neoclassical architecture ==
Neoclassicism was a style that grew out of the neoclassical movement of the mid-18th century to around 1850. The style was based on a return to Classical architecture and the Vitruvian architectural principles. It often included pillars supporting pediments and other geometric shapes such as cubes, cylinders and circles.

During the mid to late 18th century, Switzerland was a haven for poets, artists, authors, philosophers, revolutionaries and architects. In Zurich, the German speaking poets and authors Johann Jakob Bodmer, Johann Jakob Breitinger, Johann Kaspar Lavater, Salomon Gessner and Johann Heinrich Füssli wrote letters and shared ideas with their counterparts in Germany. In Geneva, Voltaire and Rousseau developed philosophies that influenced governments and revolutionaries throughout Europe. In Coppet, Madame Germaine de Staël led an influential salon of Parisian exiles. In Italy Swiss artists were exposed to both classical art and architecture as well as Neoclassical works. The ideas of Classicism, Romanticism, Humanism and Sturm und Drang, among others, flooded into the country. At the same time, the foundation of the Helvetische Gesellschaft in 1761 helped develop Switzerland's national identity and unify the country. The idea of a shared foundation of Republicanism (the Landsgemeinde), pastoral life in alpine meadows and the legend of William Tell were all part of the Classicism interpreted in Switzerland.

Beginning in the 1760s many skilled architects, builders and artists from Ticino relocated to Imperial Russia. Over the following decades entire families worked to build many of the buildings in the Russian Empire's two capitals of St. Petersburg and Moscow.

Only a few religious buildings were built in Neoclassical style, but one of the largest is the Cathedral of St. Ursus in Solothurn. The majority of classicist buildings were government, business or mansions for the wealthy. One interesting example of neoclassical sculpture is the Lion Monument in Lucerne, based on the design of Bertel Thorvaldsen. It commemorates the Swiss Guards who were massacred in 1792 during the French Revolution. The monument uses nature to honor Swiss heroes, both elements of Classicism.

During this period the traditional Swiss chalet, a small house tucked away on a high alpine meadow, began to spread outside Switzerland. The chalet first appeared in Jean-Jacques Rousseau's writings where it spread to France and then throughout Europe. The Swiss chalet style became a symbol of a simple, pastoral life built on democracy, freedom and a connection with nature. The wide variety of local styles and building materials was reduced to a wooden cottage with a gently sloping roof and wide, well-supported eaves set at right angles to the front of the house. At first, chalets appeared in the gardens and forests of wealthy European aristocrats, before spreading to spa resorts and other tourist destinations. By the second half of the 19th century, the chalet was a symbol of Switzerland and the word became common throughout the country. The design was well suited to be partially factory built and several companies manufactured chalet kits, which were shipped throughout Europe.

Classicist buildings in Switzerland
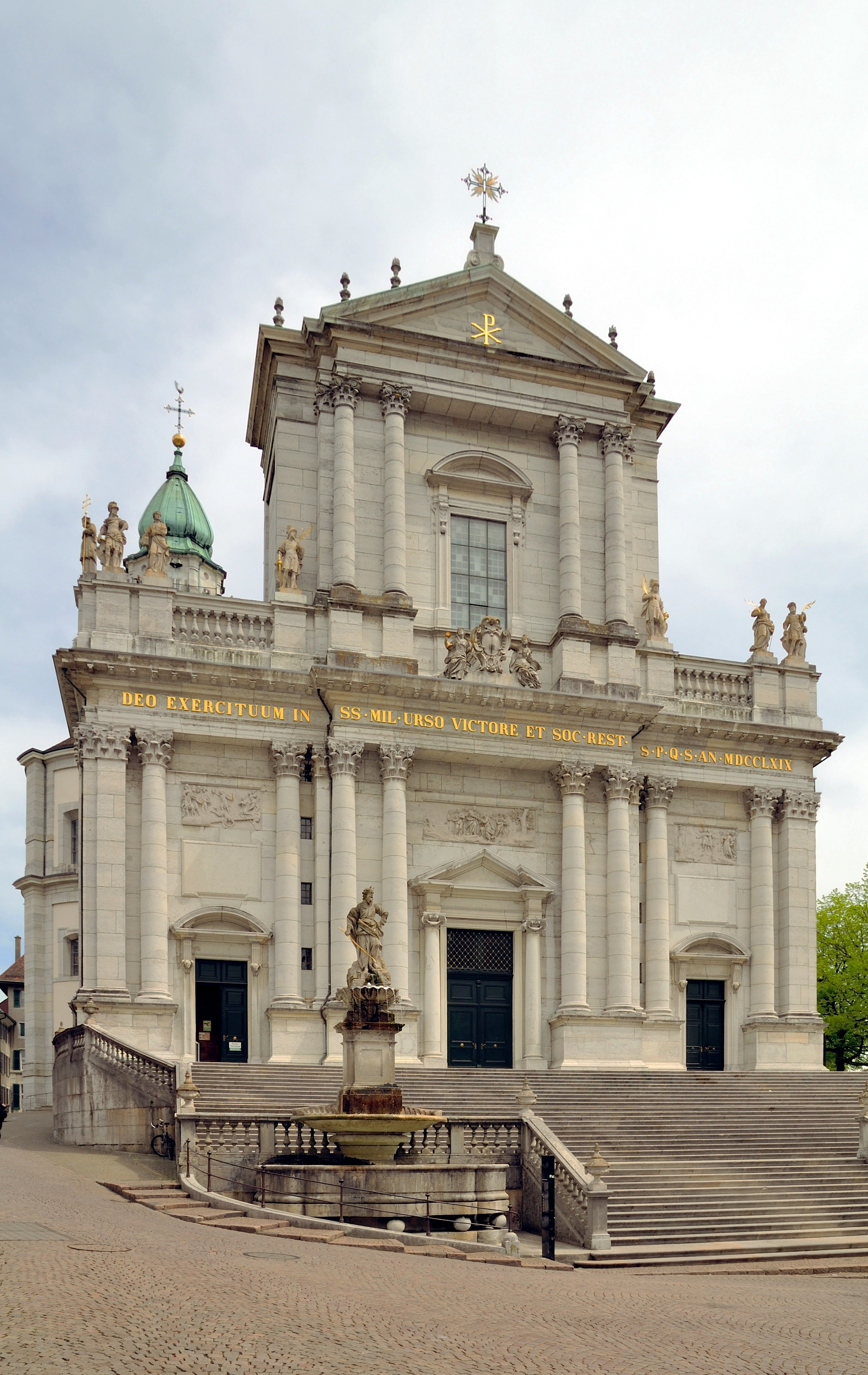
The Cathedral of St. Ursen in Solothurn

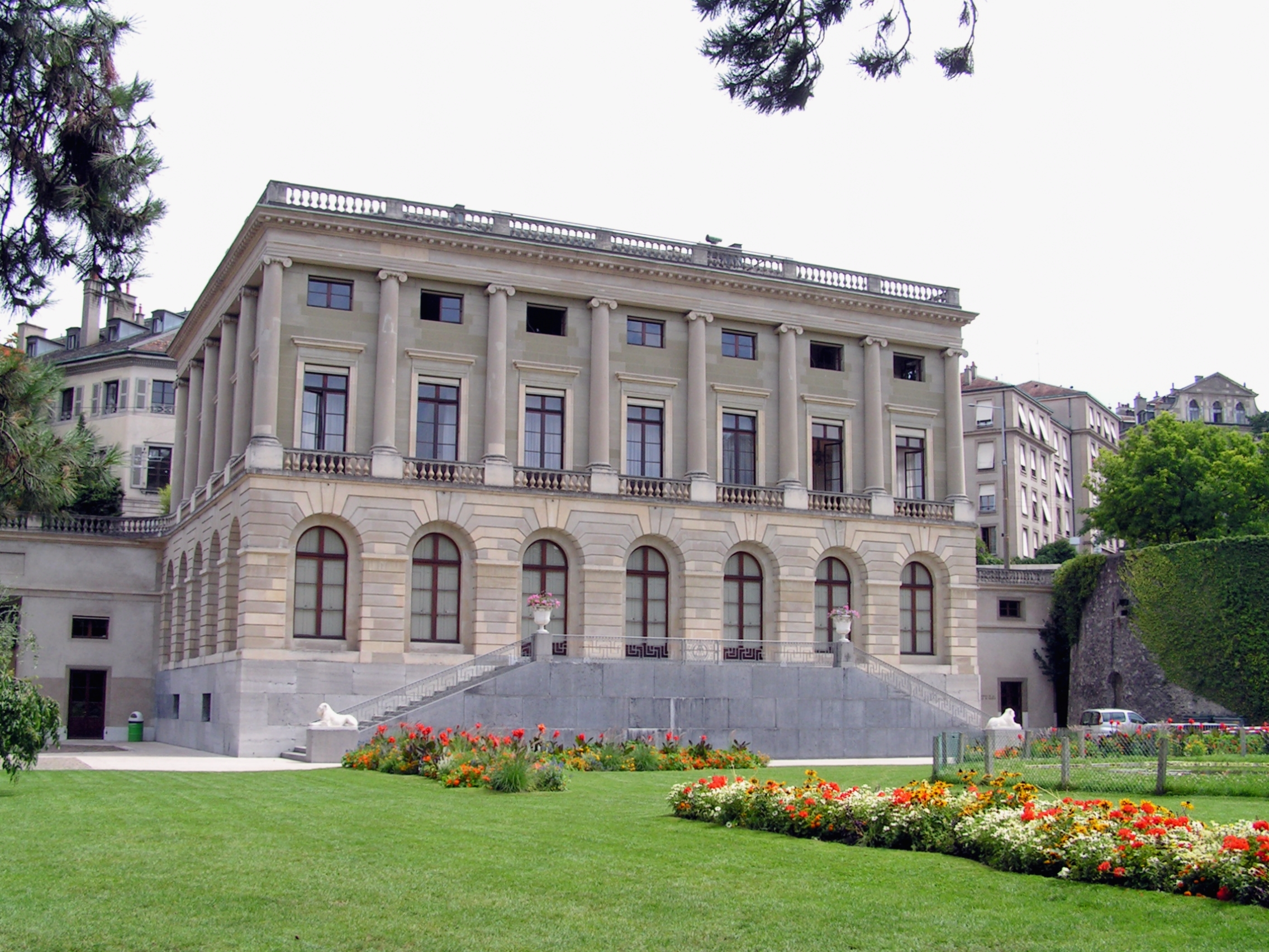
Palais Eynard in Geneva

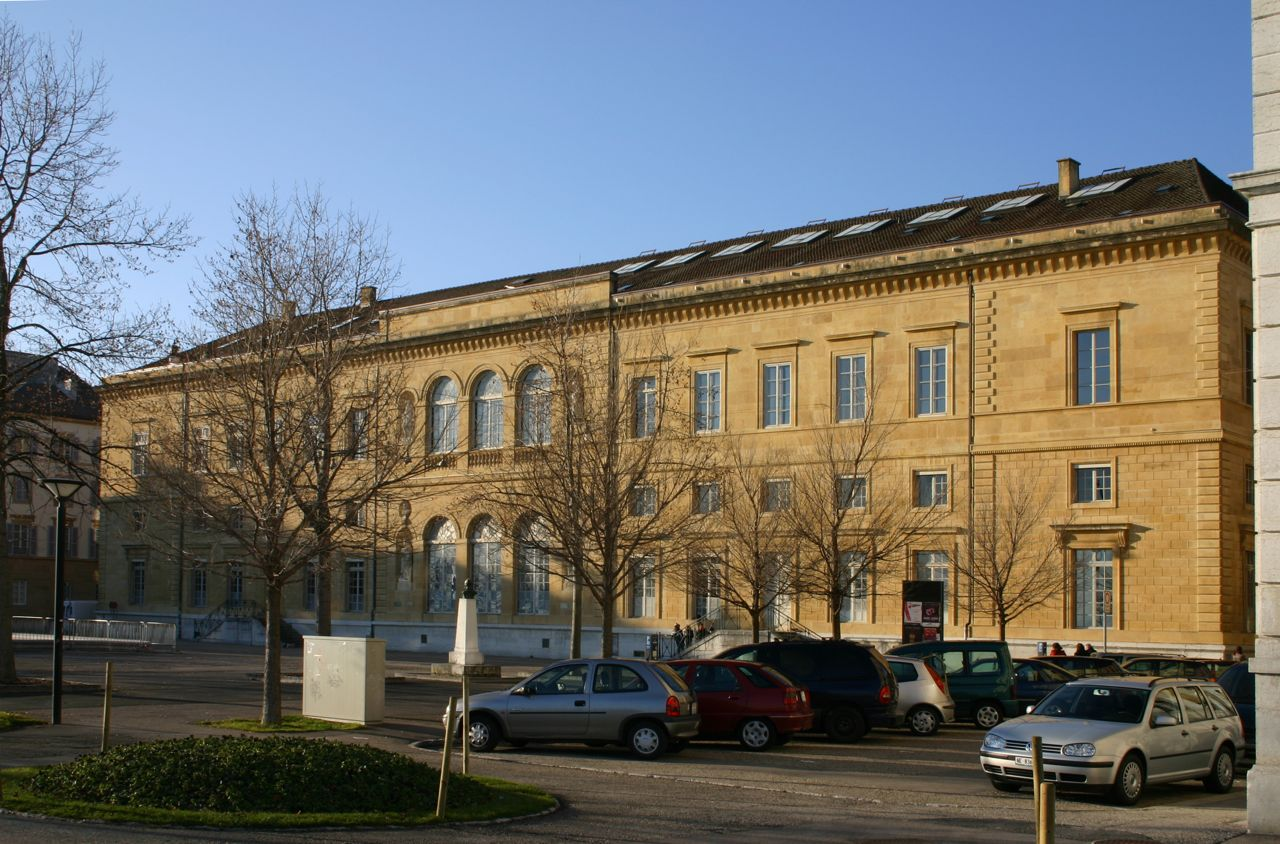
The Collège latin in Neuchatel

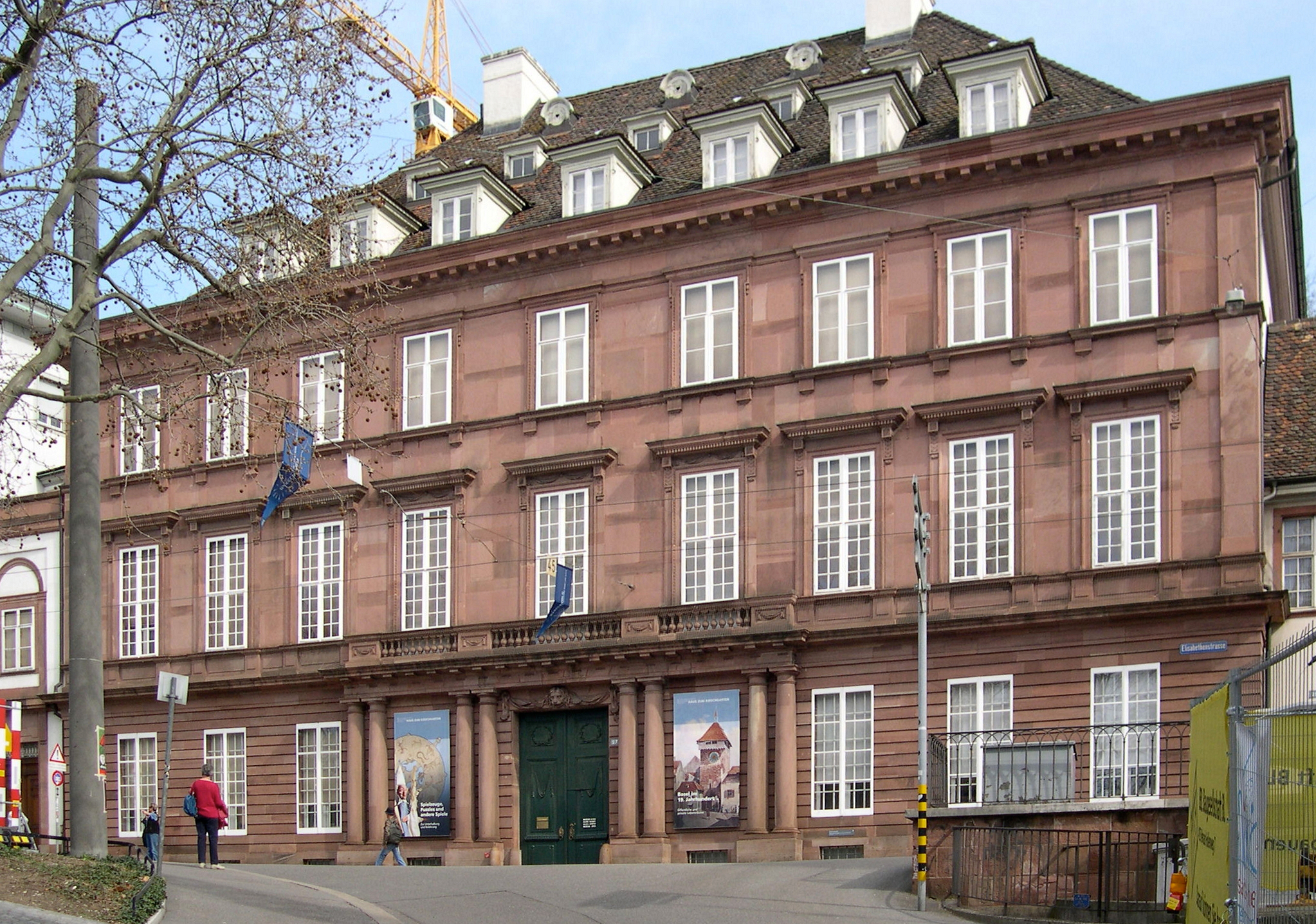
The Haus zum Kirschgarten in Basel

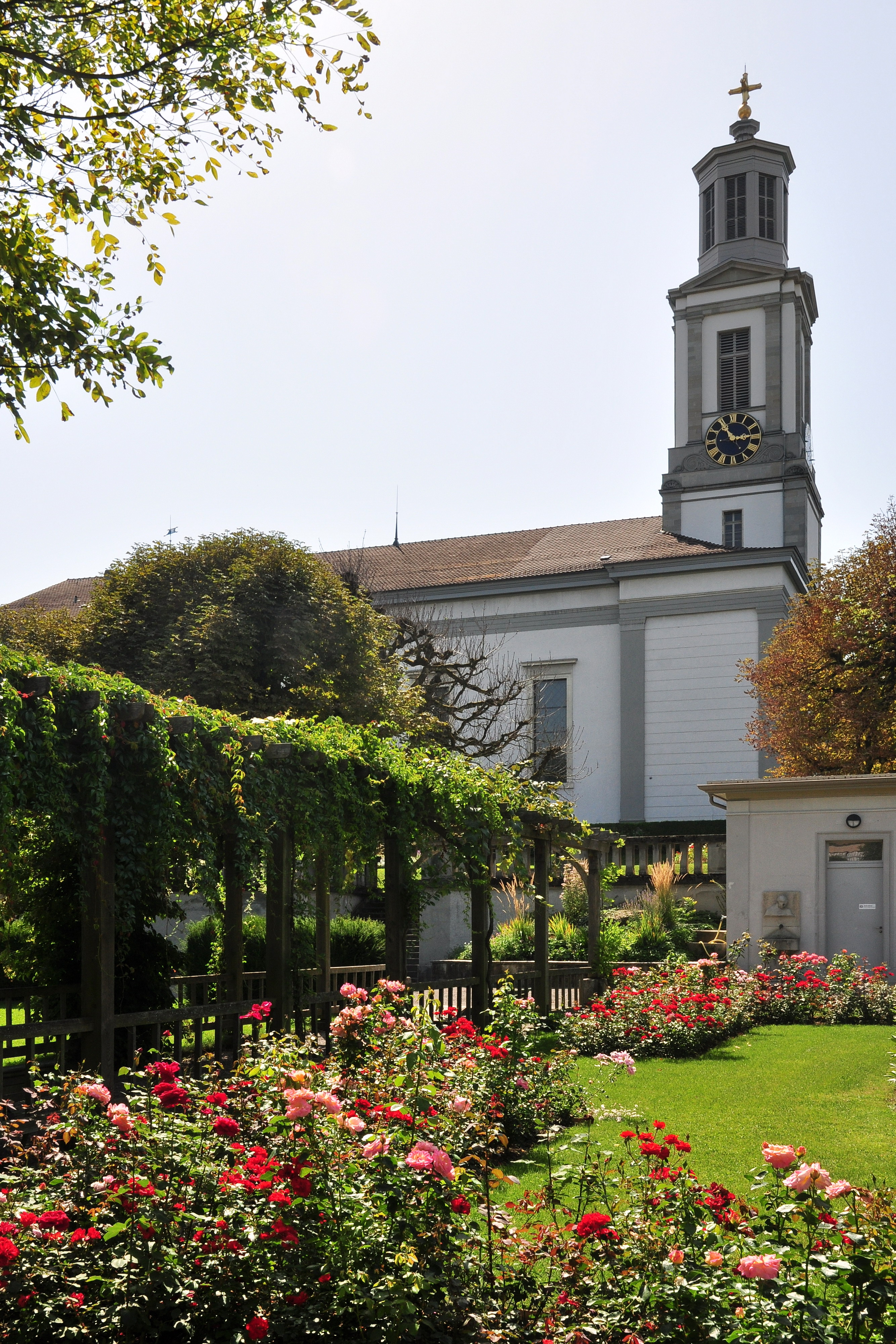
The Neumünsterkirche in Zürich

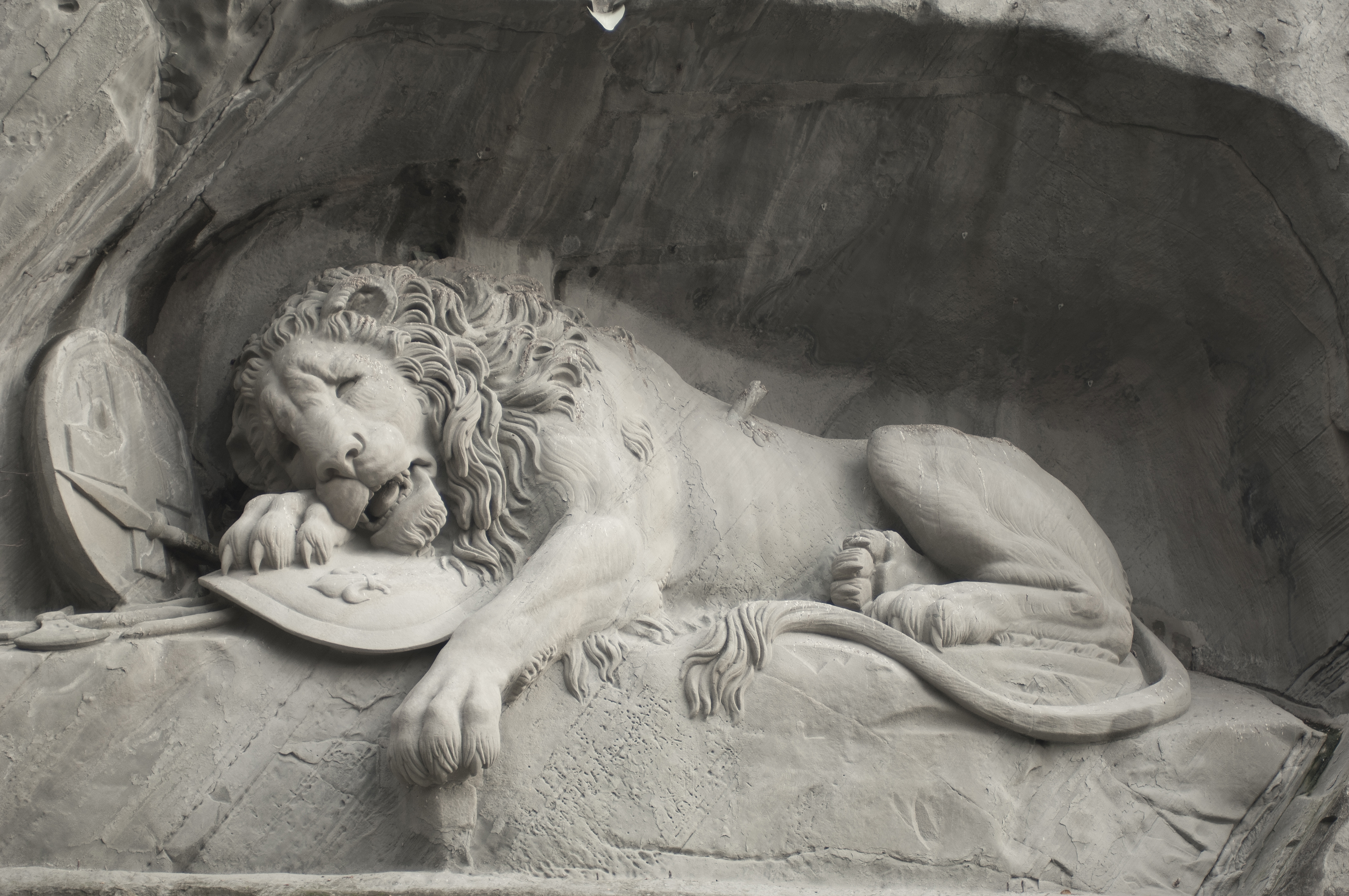
The Lion Monument of Lucerne

== Art Nouveau ==
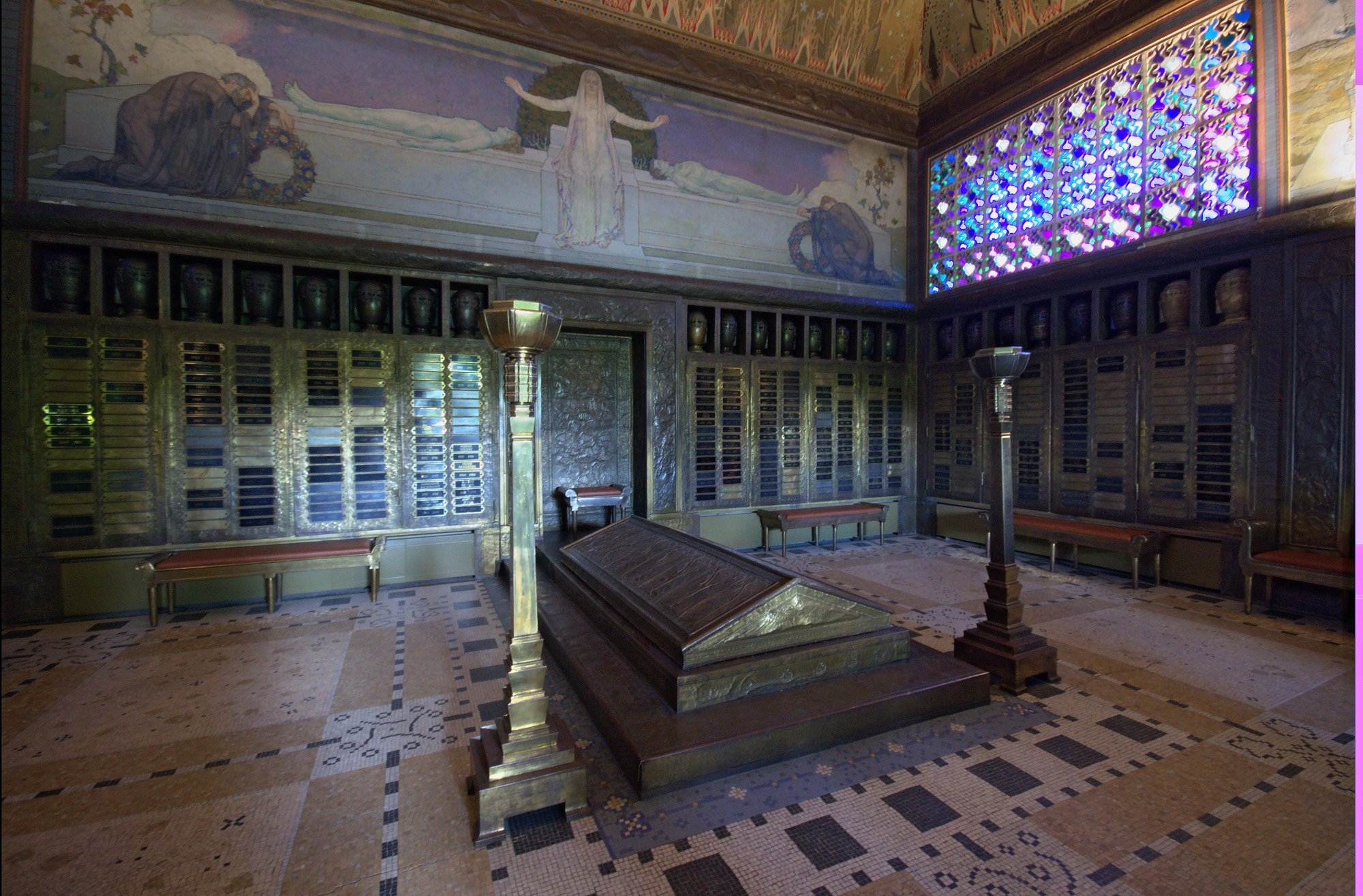
Interior of the La Chaux-de-Fonds crematorium

Art Nouveau was a style of art, architecture and decoration that was popular from the 1880s until about 1914. It was inspired by natural forms and shapes and featured whiplash lines and flowing shapes. It was a "total" art style embracing architecture, fine art, interior design, and the decorative arts, furniture, textiles, jewellery, glass and metal art, ceramics and mosaics. In French Switzerland it was known as Art Nouveau after Siegfried Bing's gallery Maison de l'Art Nouveau in Paris. In German Switzerland it was known as Jugendstil after the magazine Jugend in Munich, while in Italian Switzerland it was the Liberty style after the London department store Liberty & Co.

Art Nouveau was brought to Switzerland by designers from across Europe. The style took hold in the industrial cantons, but also appeared in mountain and spa resorts, which catered to foreign visitors. While a few complete Art Nouveau buildings are scattered across the country, the industrial watch-making city of La Chaux-de-Fonds was the centre of Art Nouveau in Switzerland. One of the leaders of this style in La Chaux-de-Fonds was Charles l'Eplattenier, who helped develop the local Style Sapin or "Pine Tree Style", so called due to its intense study of nature and natural shapes. L'Eplattenier designed the town's crematorium and the Musée des Beaux-Arts de La Chaux-de-Fonds (Beaux-Arts Museum of La-Chaux-de-Fonds).

== Heimatstil ==
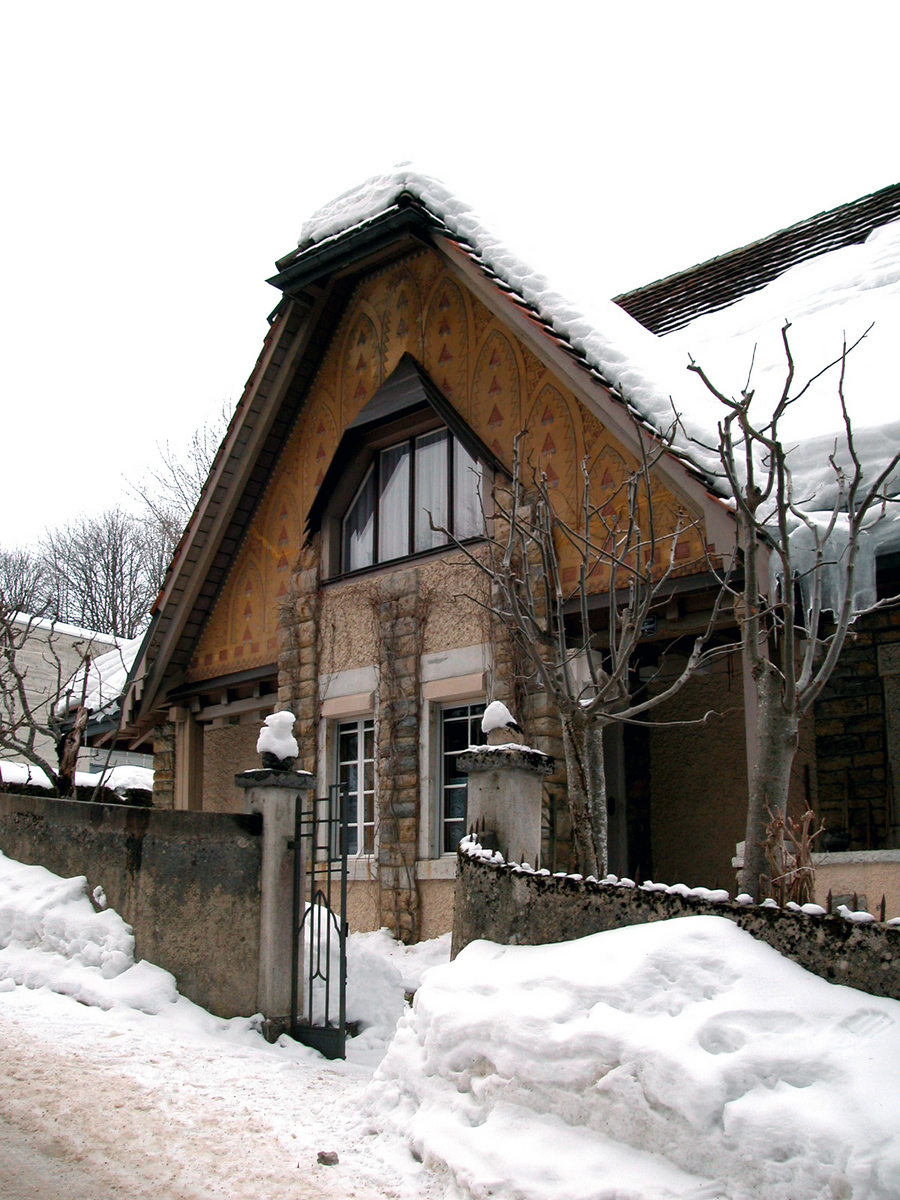
Villa Fallet, Le Corbusier's first commission, an example of Heimatstil and Art Nouveau

At the same time as Art Nouveau was spreading into Switzerland, a branch of Modern architecture known as Heimatstil or Heimatschutzstil was developing in Germany and German Switzerland. In contrast to Art Nouveau, the Heimatstil was a reaction to industrialization and urbanization and wanted to return to traditional living. This style focused on using traditional elements in modern buildings, while preserving historic buildings and cityscapes, traditional rural living and agriculture. Particularly in Switzerland the image of the Alps, alpine herding and agriculture became a key part of the movement.

Each region of Switzerland began to incorporate local traditional materials and designs into modern houses, apartment buildings, hotels, schools and even industrial buildings. Heimatstil architects included Nicolaus Hartmann in Graubünden, Armin Witmer-Karrer in Zürich, Karl Indermühle in Bern, Alphonse Laverrière in Lausanne und Edmond Fatio in Geneva. In La Chaux-de-Fonds, René Chapallaz and his better known pupil Le Corbusier built several buildings that connected Heimatstil and Art Nouveau, including Villa Fallet which was Le Corbusier's first commission.

Out of a desire to preserve the traditional, the Swiss Heritage Society was created on 1 July 1905 and by 1910 had over 7,000 members. The Society published a monthly magazine which included examples of "good" and "bad" architecture, which reinforced the use of traditional designs. Later they led political campaigns against hydroelectric projects and highways and in 1962 were able to include protection of natural and architectural heritage in the Swiss Federal Constitution. Since 1972, the Heritage Society has awarded the Wakker Prize to recognize a community for exceptional preservation work.

== Modern architecture ==
Modern architecture is a group of styles of architecture which emerged in the first half of the 20th century and became dominant after World War II. It was based upon new technologies of construction, particularly the use of glass, steel and reinforced concrete; and upon a rejection of the traditional neoclassical architecture and Beaux-Arts styles that were popular in the 19th century.

The first school of architecture in Switzerland was the ETH Zurich Faculty of Architecture (ETHZ), which opened in 1855. The Zurich school trained architects quickly found work across the country and the world, designing private and public buildings. While the school initially focused on classical architecture, in 1915 Karl Coelestin Moser, an early leader in the Modern movement, was appointed a professor at ETHZ. In 1927, he designed St. Antonius Church in Basel, which was the first concrete church in Switzerland. In the 1920s, Hans Benno Bernoulli built the Wasserhaus housing development, a novel cooperative settlement outside Basel.

Following the model of the Deutscher Werkbund, in 1913 the Schweizerischer Werkbund (SWB) was established in Zurich which helped spread Modern architecture to German-speaking Switzerland. Additionally, one of the founding members of the SWB was the painter Charles L'Eplattenier, who returned to Yverdon-les-Bains and founded a French sister organization known as L'Œuvre (OEV). Both organizations encouraged close cooperation between artists, architects, designers and industry, though they differed in their approach to mass production and traditionalism. Both organizations continued to publish journals and influence design into the 21st century, though in 2003 the OEV was absorbed into the SWB and became a regional chapter.

One of the most influential Modern Swiss architects was Charles-Édouard Jeanneret, known as Le Corbusier. Le Corbusier studied art under Charles L'Eplattenier and René Chapallaz in La Chaux-de-Fonds and was initially influenced by his teachers' involvement in Art Nouveau, Heimatstil, and L'Œuvre (OEV). He was a member of OEV for a few years before leaving in 1918. In the 1920s he developed a style that made use of reinforced concrete to create a weightless, open space with non-weight bearing facades that could be freely designed and decorated. In the 1940s he began working on urban planning and designed large, concrete modular buildings for offices and apartments, culminating in the design of the Chandigarh Capitol Complex in Chandigarh in the newly formed Indian state in the 1950s. Two of Le Corbusier's buildings in Switzerland, the Immeuble Clarté and Villa Le Lac are part of the UNESCO World Heritage Site "The Architectural Work of Le Corbusier, an Outstanding Contribution to the Modern Movement".

Under the leadership of Swiss architects including Le Corbusier, Hélène de Mandrot and Sigfried Giedion, the Congrès International d'Architecture Moderne (CIAM) was organized in La Sarraz in 1928. Over the years that the CIAM was active, they formalized the architectural principles of the Modern movement and developed principles of urban planning that spread throughout the world.

After World War II, Modern architecture became the dominant style throughout the country. At the same time it began to divide into many different forms and regional styles. In Ticino, a group of architects including Tita Carloni, Luigi Snozzi, Bruno Reichlin, Fabio Reinhart and Mario Botta developed a style based on Functionalism and Rationalism and incorporating contrasts often with geometric designs and using local materials. The Graubünden Movement consists of a number of Swiss architects who build modern structures that blend into the local villages. One of the most famous is Peter Zumthor, who builds simple, down to earth buildings with minimal use of resources. Other Graubünden Movement architects include Valerio Olgiati, Raphael Zuber, Andrea Deplazes and Gion A. Caminada.

Modern buildings in Switzerland
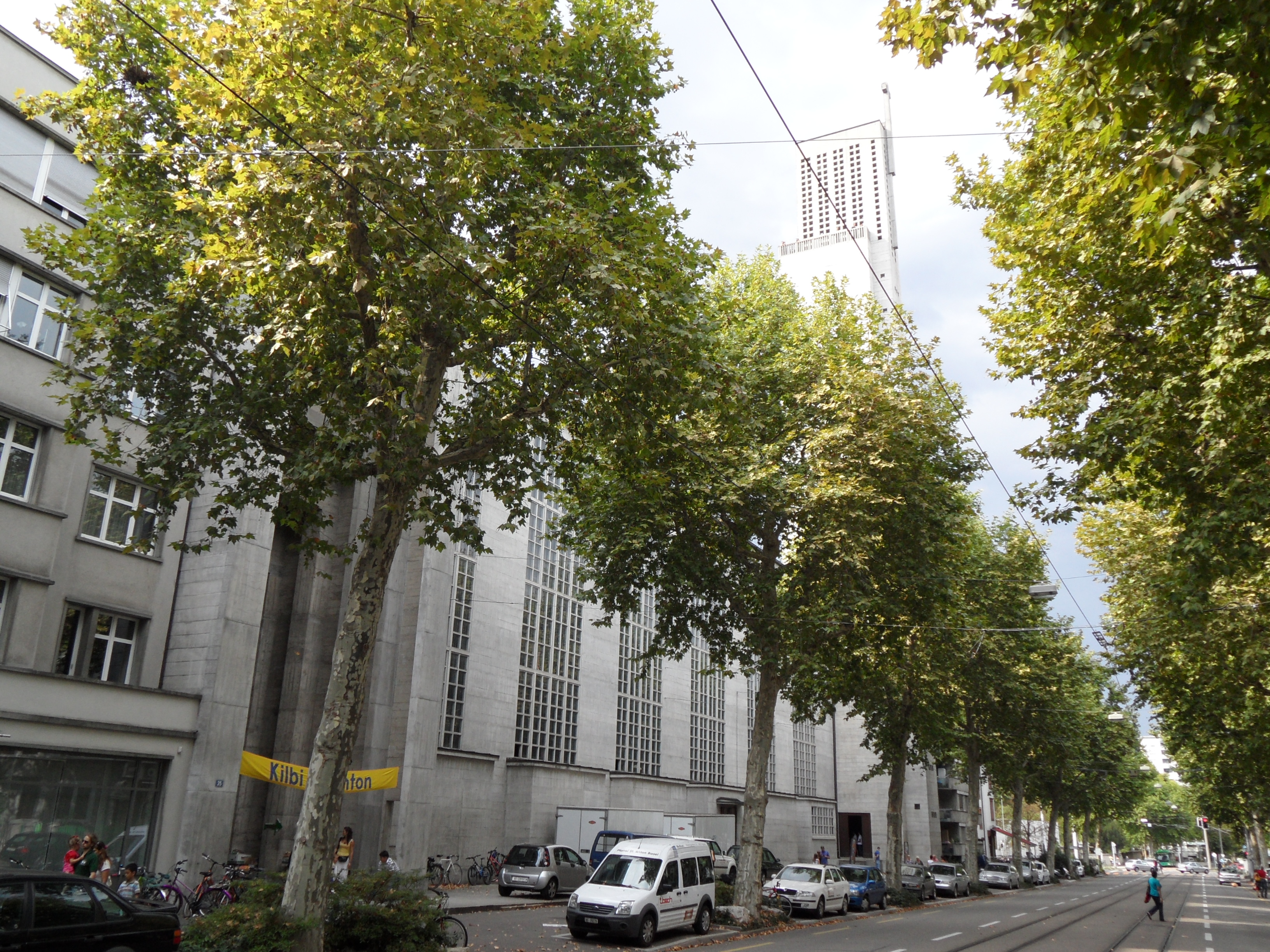
St. Antonius Church in Basel

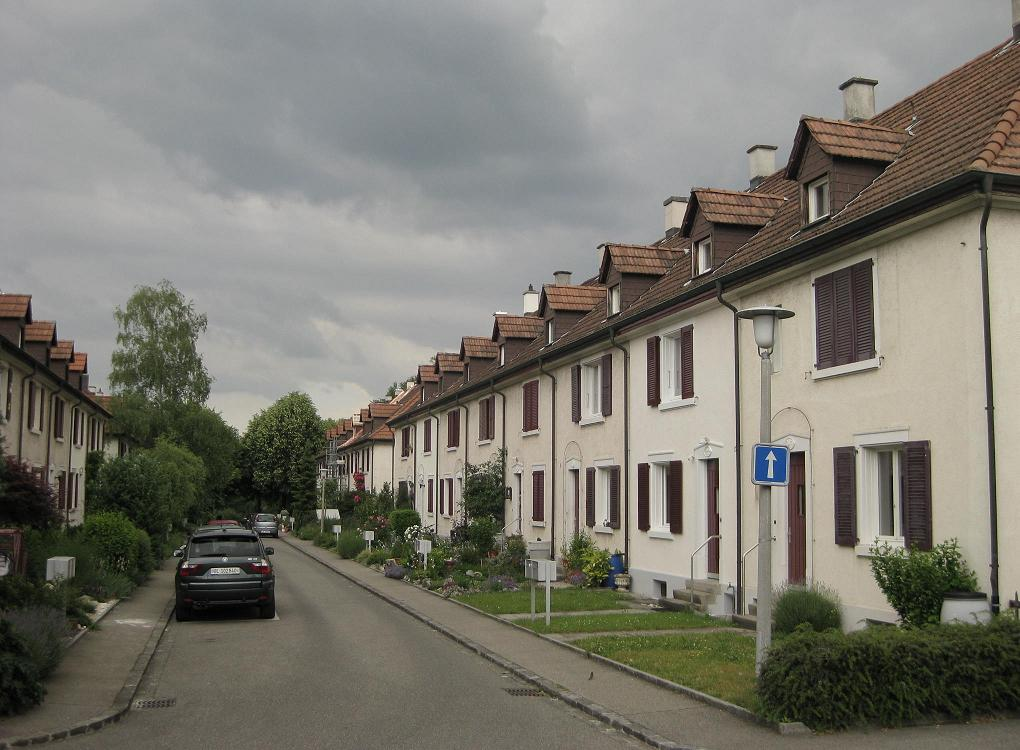
Wasserhaus terraced homes, an early cooperative housing development

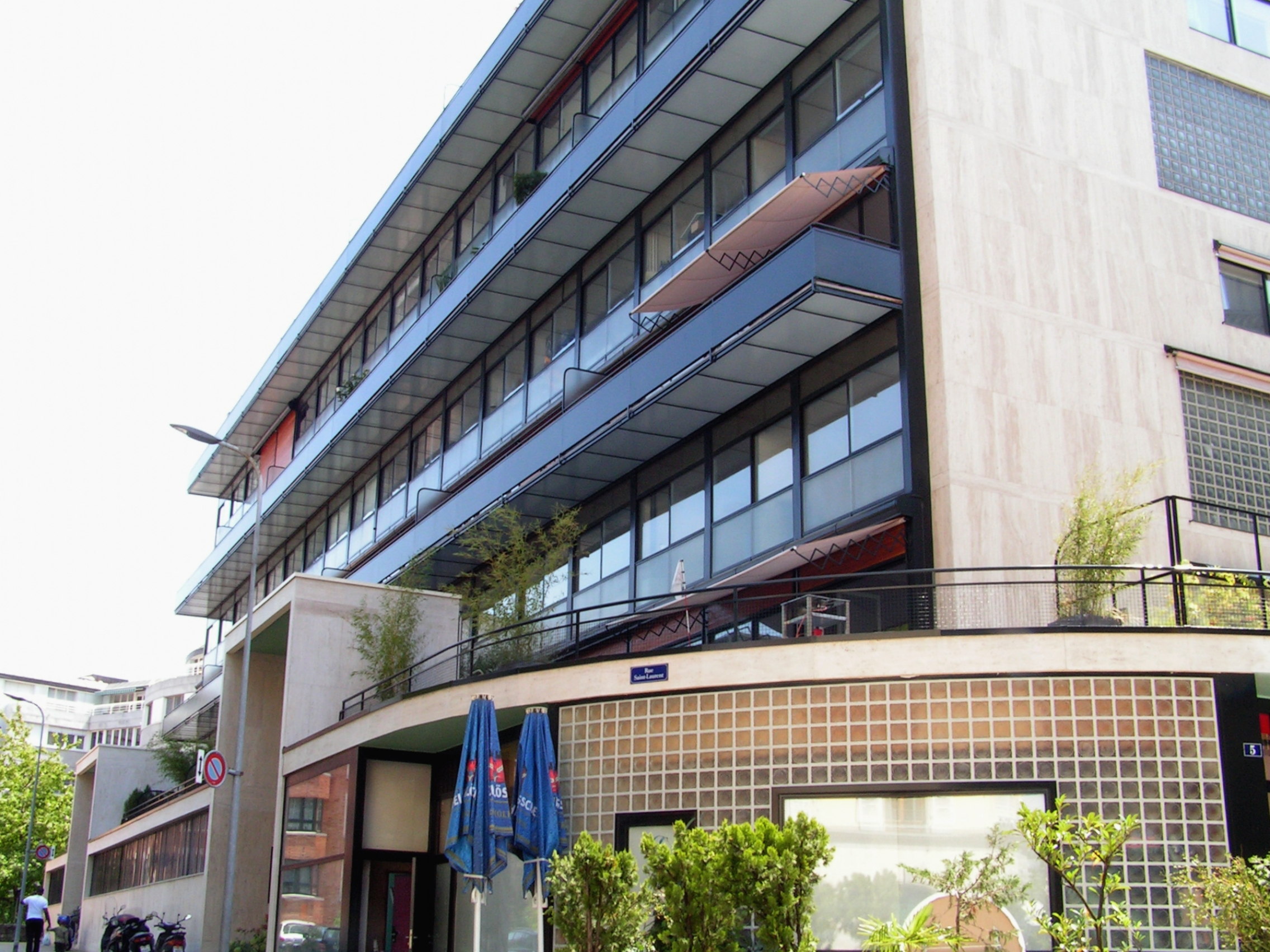
Immeuble Clarté in Genève, designed by Le Corbusier

Church of San Giovanni Battista in Mogno village by Mario Botta

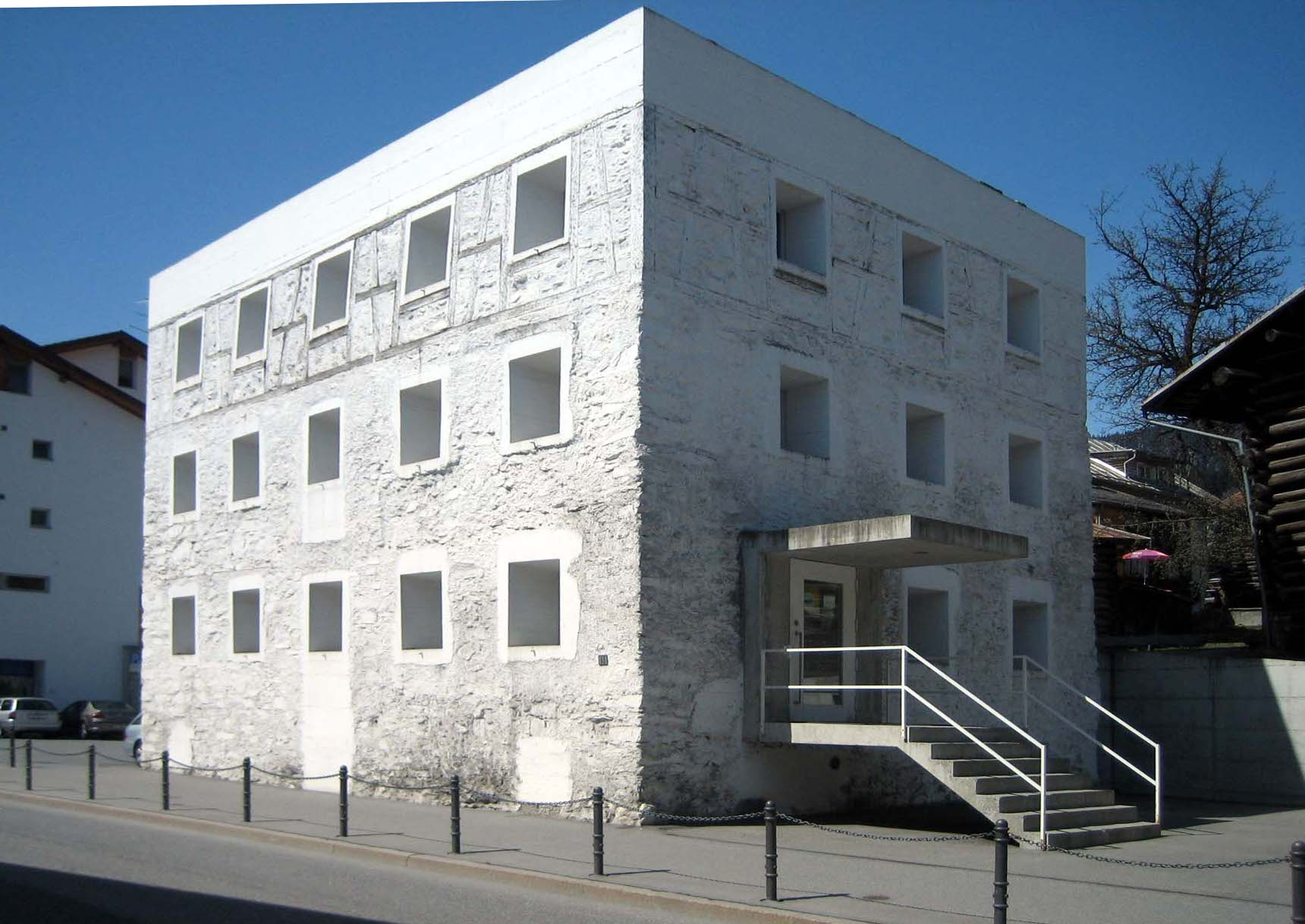
The Yellow House by Valerio Olgiati in Flims

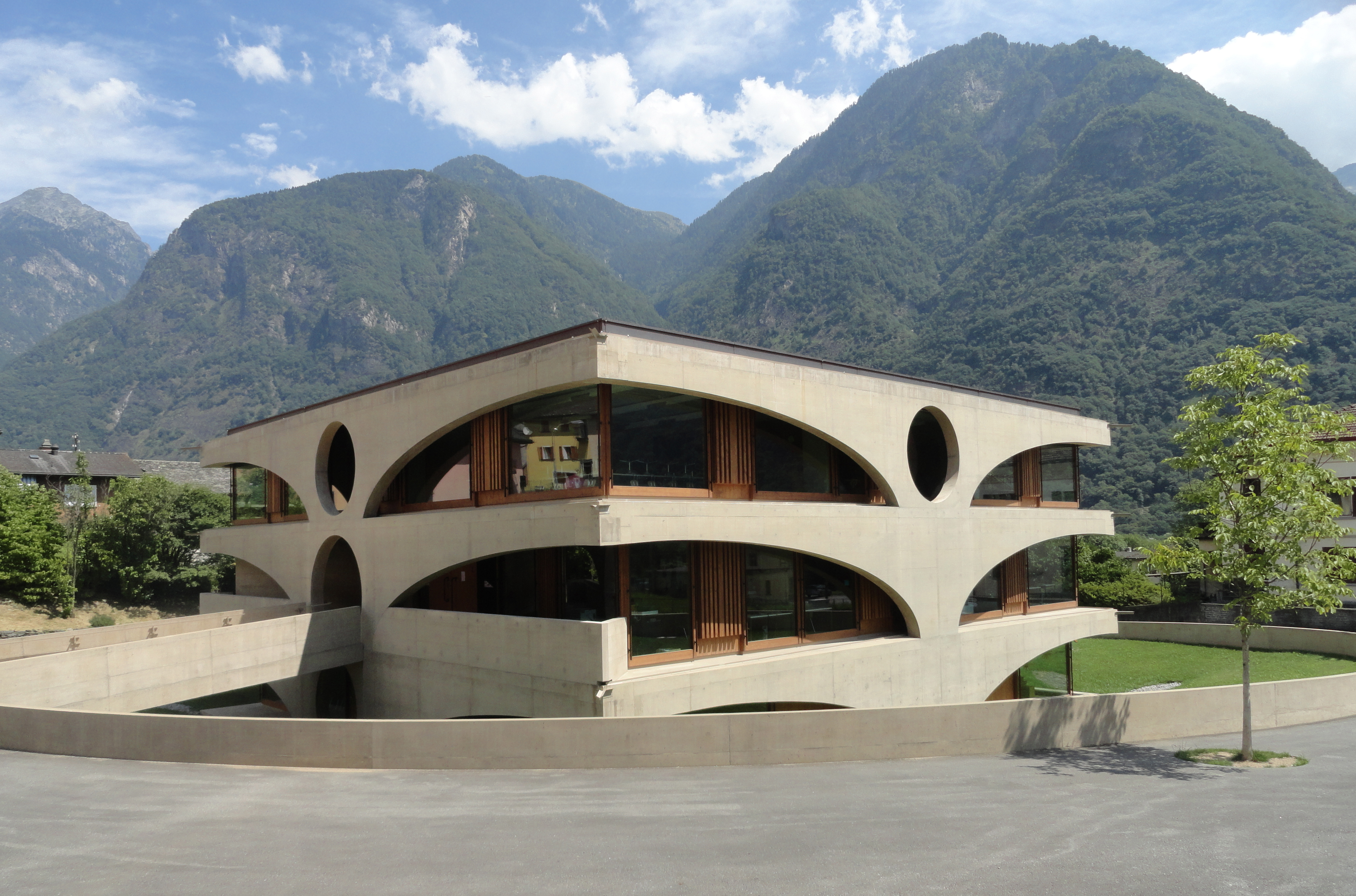
Schoolhouse Grono by Raphael Zuber

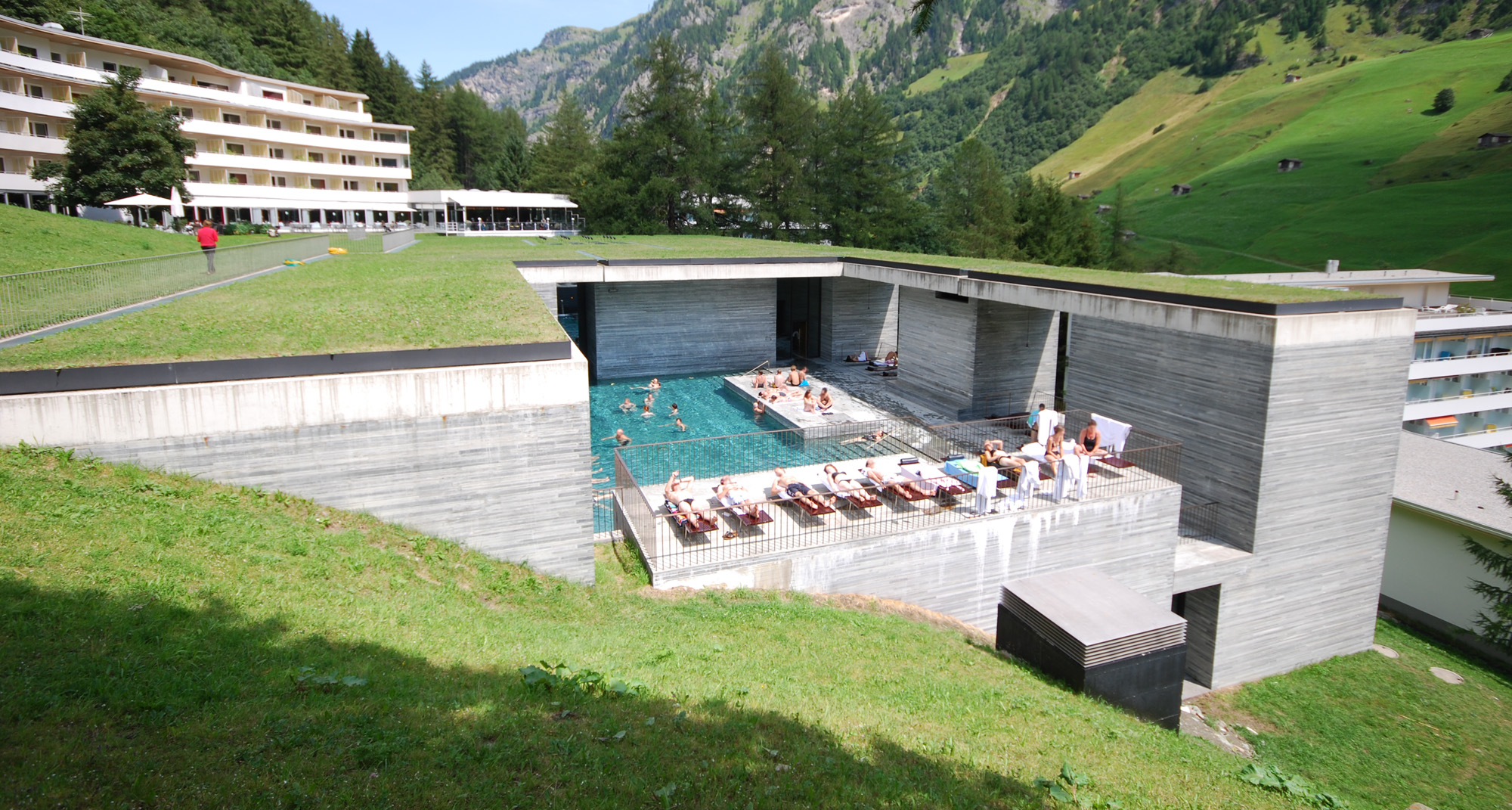
Therme Vals pool by Peter Zumthor

== Vernacular architecture ==
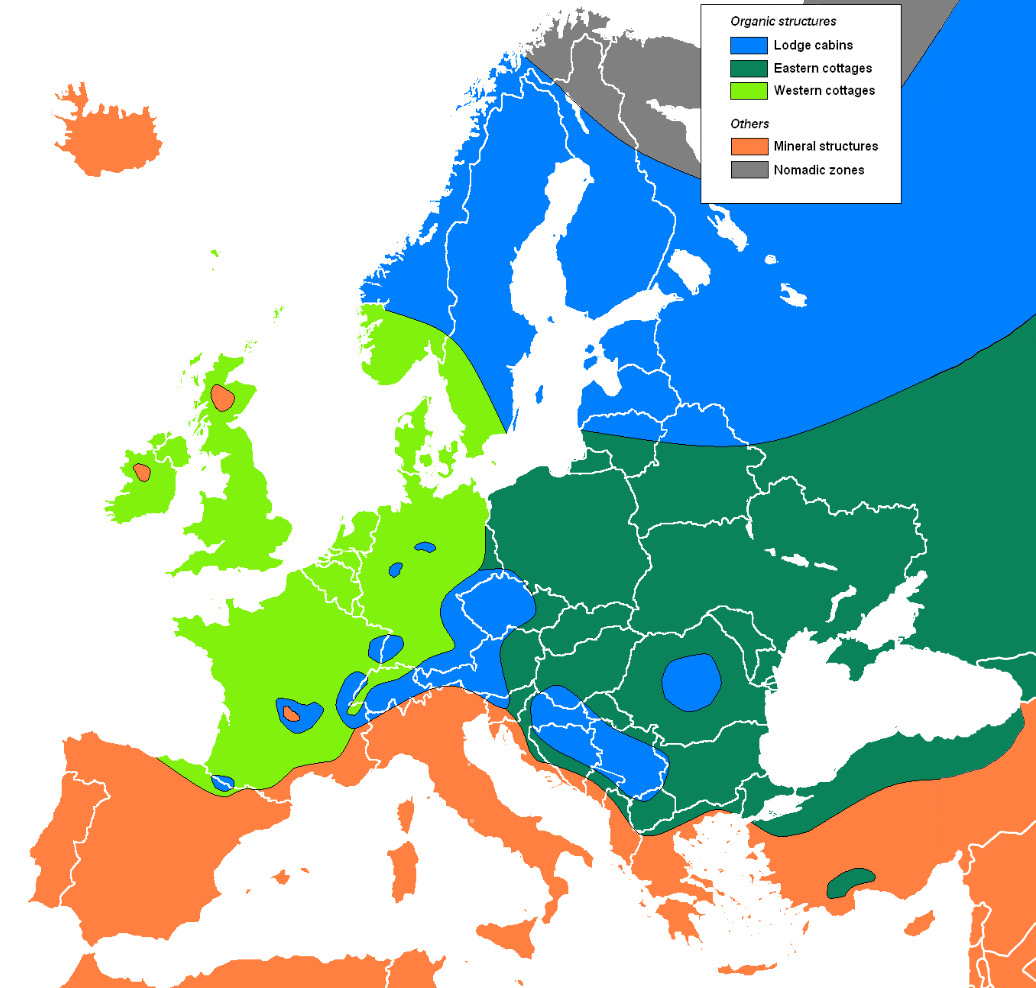
Map of building types used in European farmhouses. Switzerland contains regions that include three of the five broad types.

Traditional Swiss farm and village house design depended on a number of factors including the local climate, type of agriculture, materials available, local tradition and location. Each region in Switzerland developed their own style of vernacular architecture to meet these factors. Migrations such as the spread of the Walser into Valais, the spread of Germanic culture into the Romansh regions of Graubünden and the Swiss invasion of Ticino allowed mixing of different traditional styles. The growth of alpine transhumance, were cattle summered in high alpine meadows and wintered in the valleys, required different designs for housing.

Until the end of the Early Middle Ages most farms consisted of several separate buildings, each with a specific purpose. Beginning in the 11th century many of the out-buildings began to be combined into a single multi-purpose farm buildings. Farm houses now often contained living quarters, larders, stalls and feed storage under a single roof, but isolated by walls. The kitchens were generally chimney free until the 17th century, though in some poorer areas chimneys remained uncommon into the 19th century. However, using stone ovens or fireplaces to heat rooms became common by the 14th century in the northern Alpine foothills and Alpine valleys. External decoration became increasing visible on both wood and stone buildings after 1500. Façade decoration reached its peak in the 17th and 18th centuries before becoming less common and simpler in the following centuries.

=== North-west and Jura ===
In western Switzerland and the Jura Mountains most houses were built of stone due to limited timber supplies. However, in northern Switzerland and the Bernese Mittelland plentiful wood meant that most construction was either all wood or wooden with a stone foundation. In both regions, by the 15th century, the local style had evolved into a multi-story, multi-purpose byre-dwelling with animals, fodder, storage and living quarters under one roof. Houses in the high Jura Mountains were built with small windows to protect them from winter wind and snow, while those in the more temperate Swiss Plateau usually had lighter walls and larger windows. Shallowly sloping shingle roofs were replaced with ones with a steeper, tiled roof beginning in the 16th century. Other farmhouses remained thatched until the introduction of fire insurance in the 19th century after which they gradually disappeared. In the Bernese Oberland, the Stöckli, a residence for the owner's aging parents, became a common sight in the 19th century.

Traditional buildings of the West, North-West and Jura regions
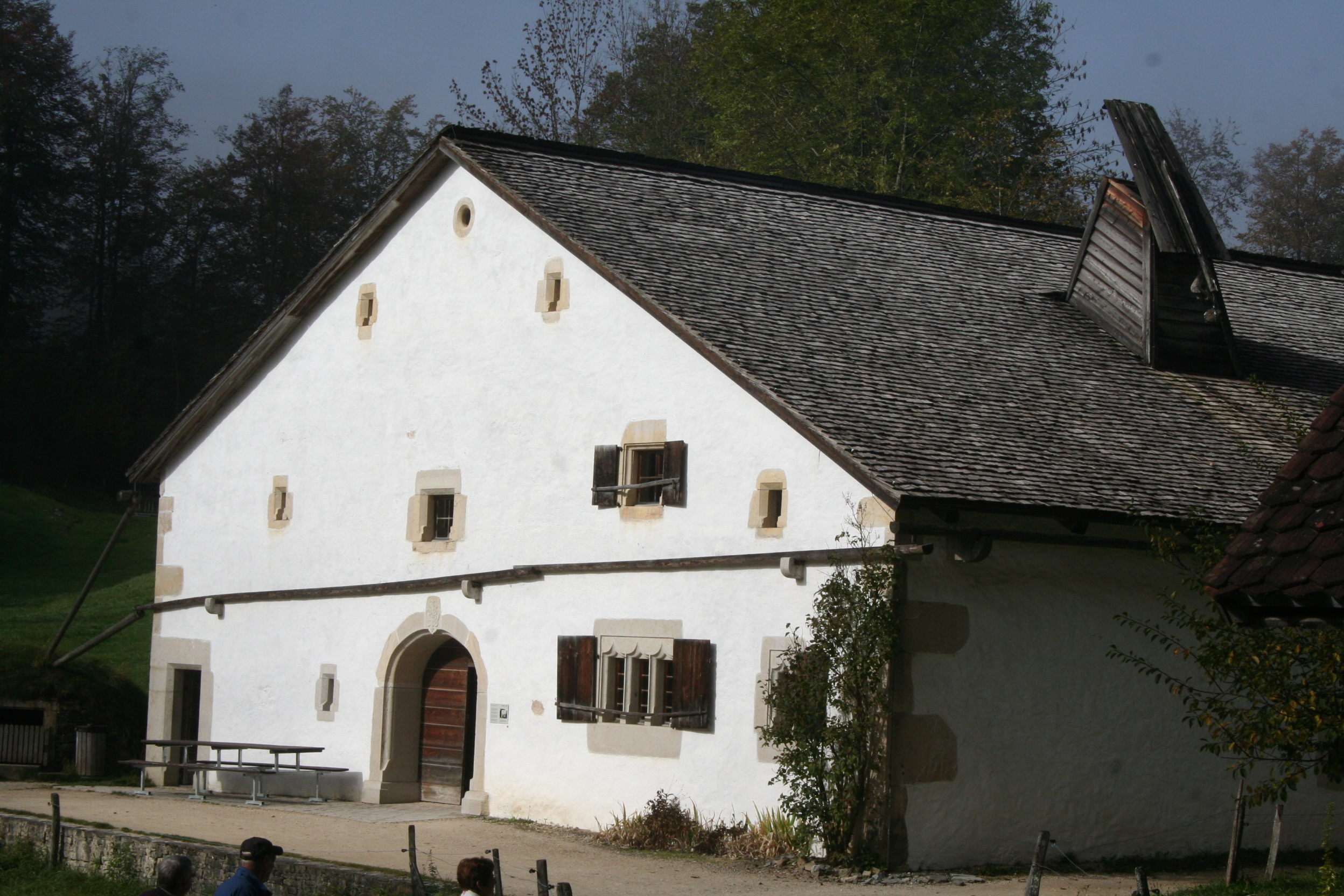
La Chaux-de-Fonds, Neuchatel

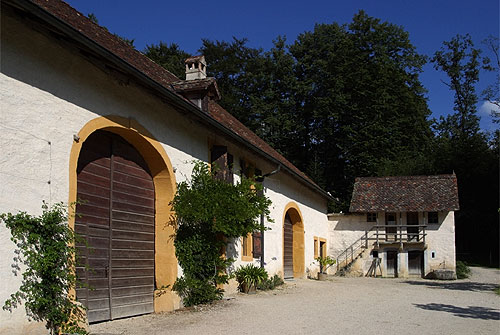
Lancy, Geneva

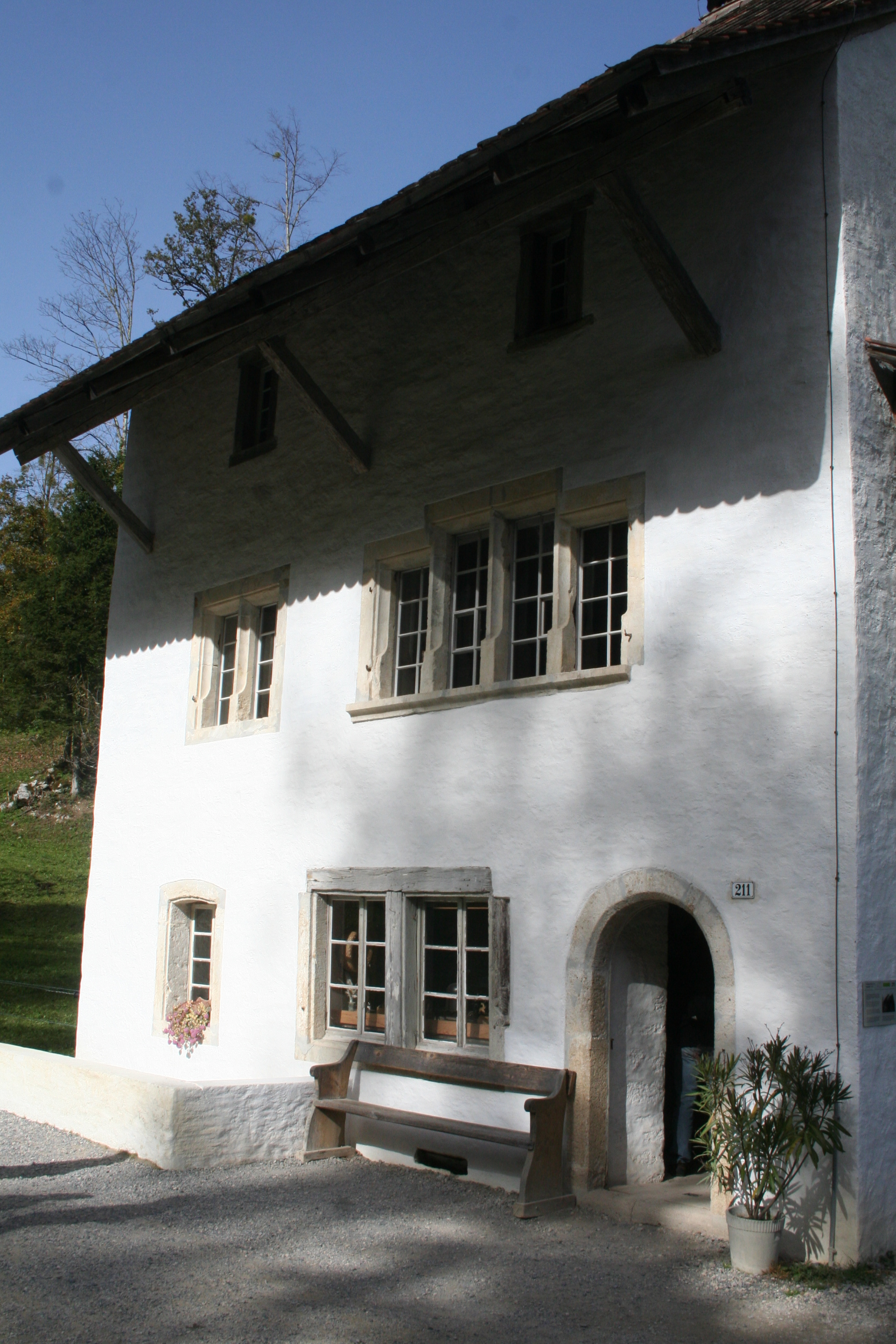
Villnachern, Aargau

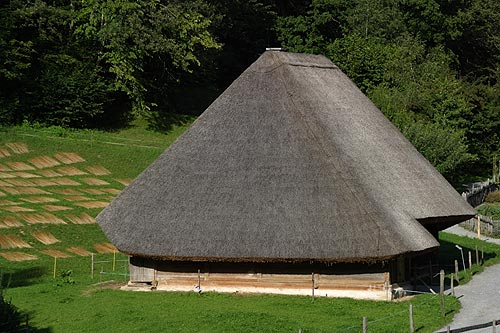
Leutwil, Aargau

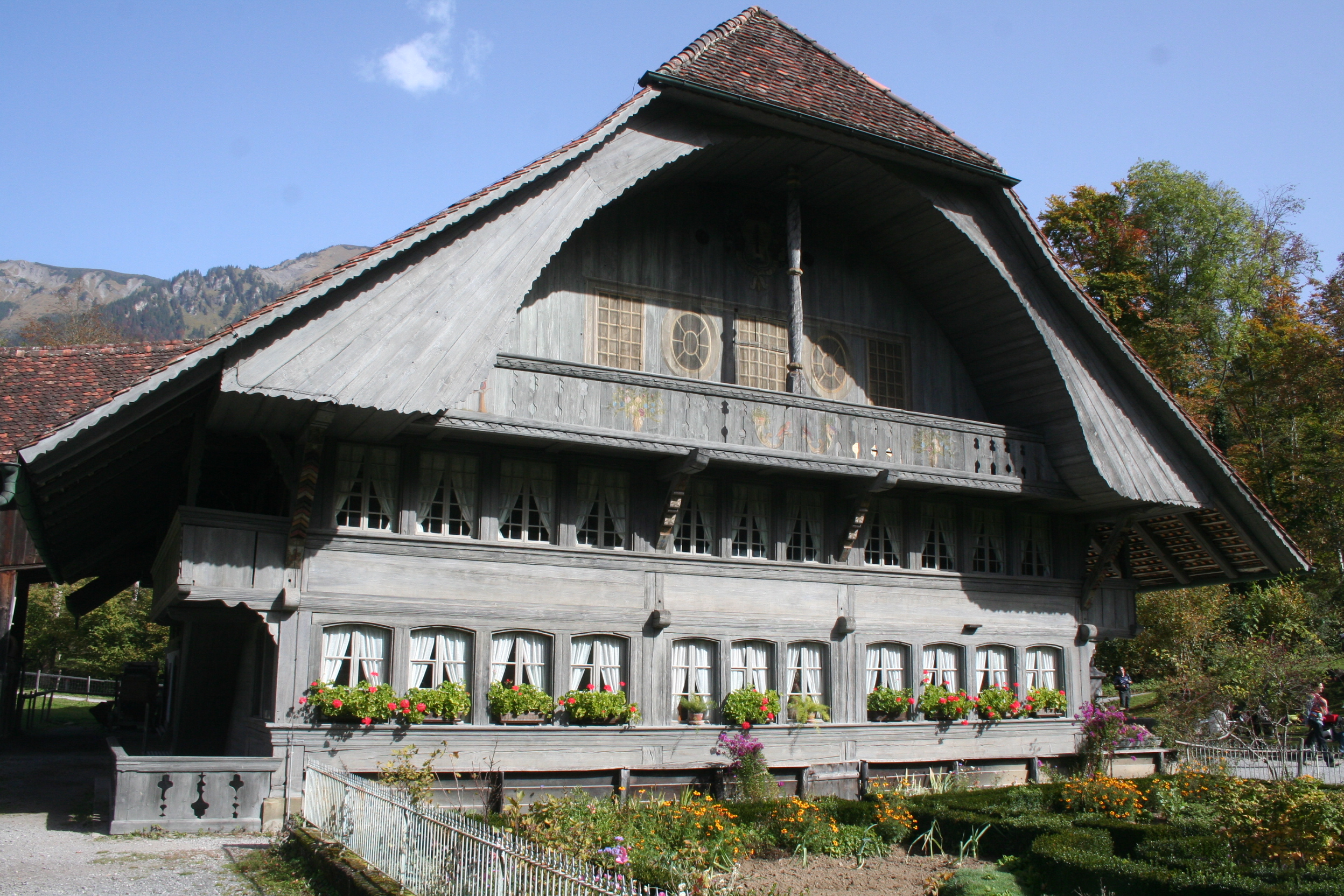
Ostermundigen, Bern

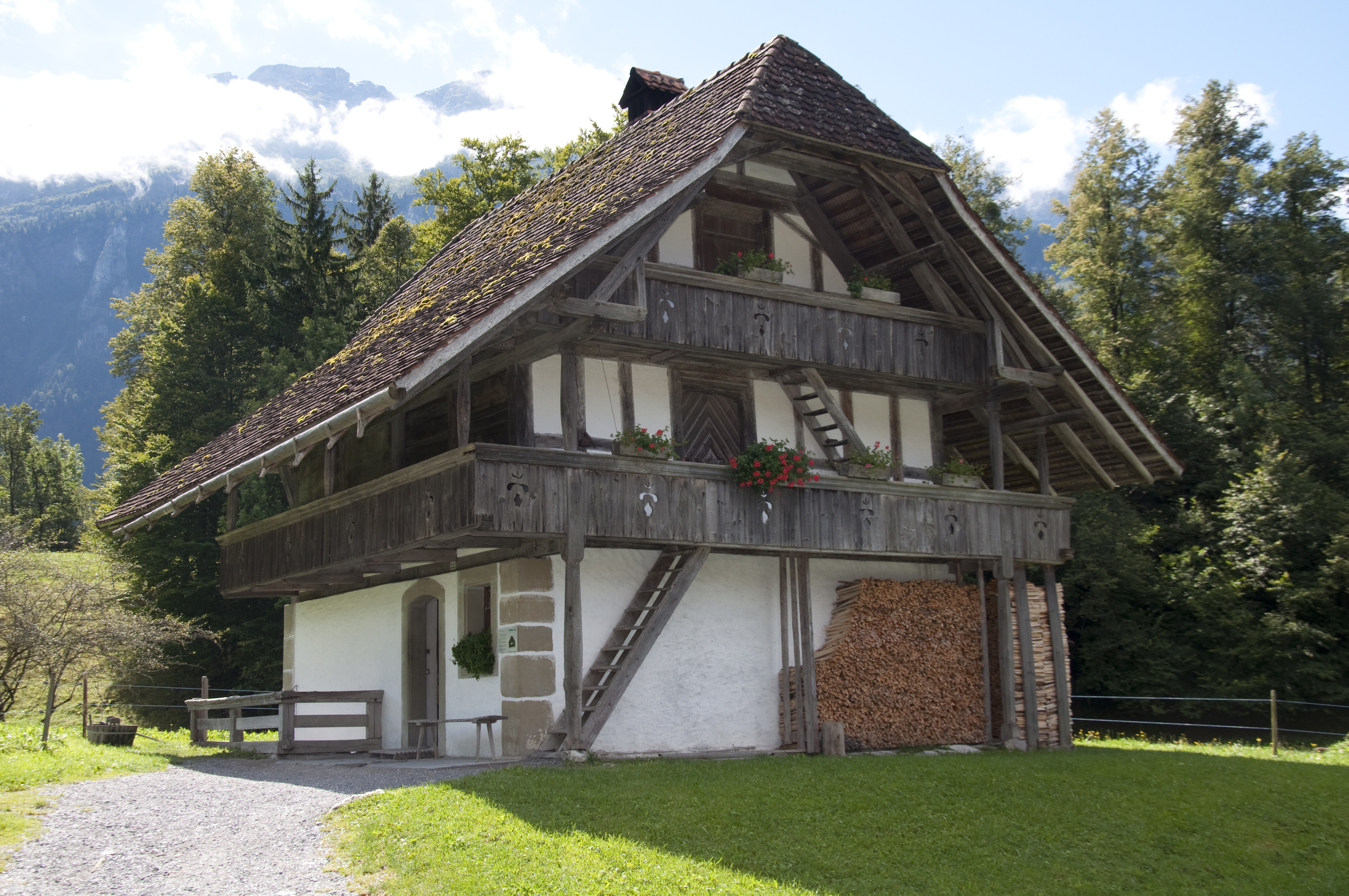
A Stöckli house from Radelfingen, Bern

=== North-east and eastern ===
In the north-east along the Rhine river, half-timbered construction was imported from southern Germany and gradually spread into the eastern Middlelands. Other houses were built with stacked plank construction, such as the example from Wila below. Despite the different building materials, multi-story byre-dwellings developed in north-eastern and eastern Switzerland around the same time as they did in the west. In the 16th century restrictions on building and the rise of the home textile industry (the Putting-out system) led to the creation of the Flarz, a complex of smaller apartments created by expanding existing buildings, in the Zurich Oberland.

Traditional buildings of the North-East and East regions
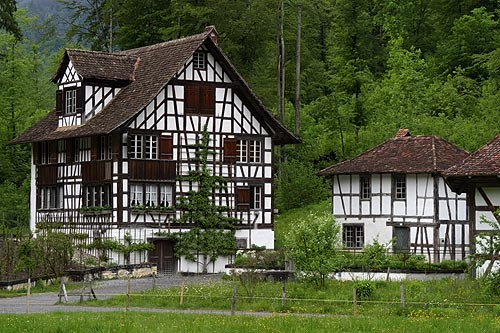
Richterswil, Zurich

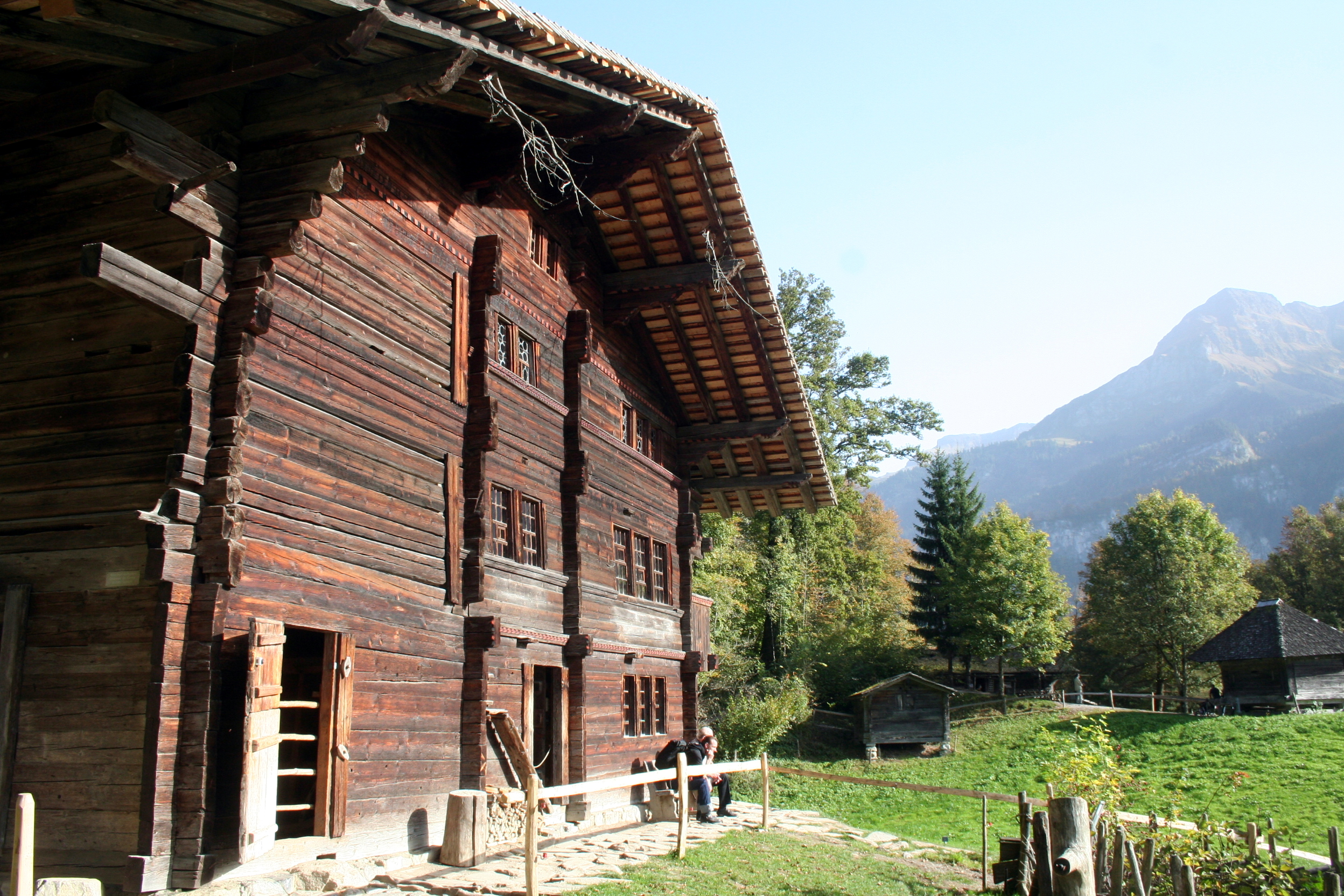
Wila, Zurich

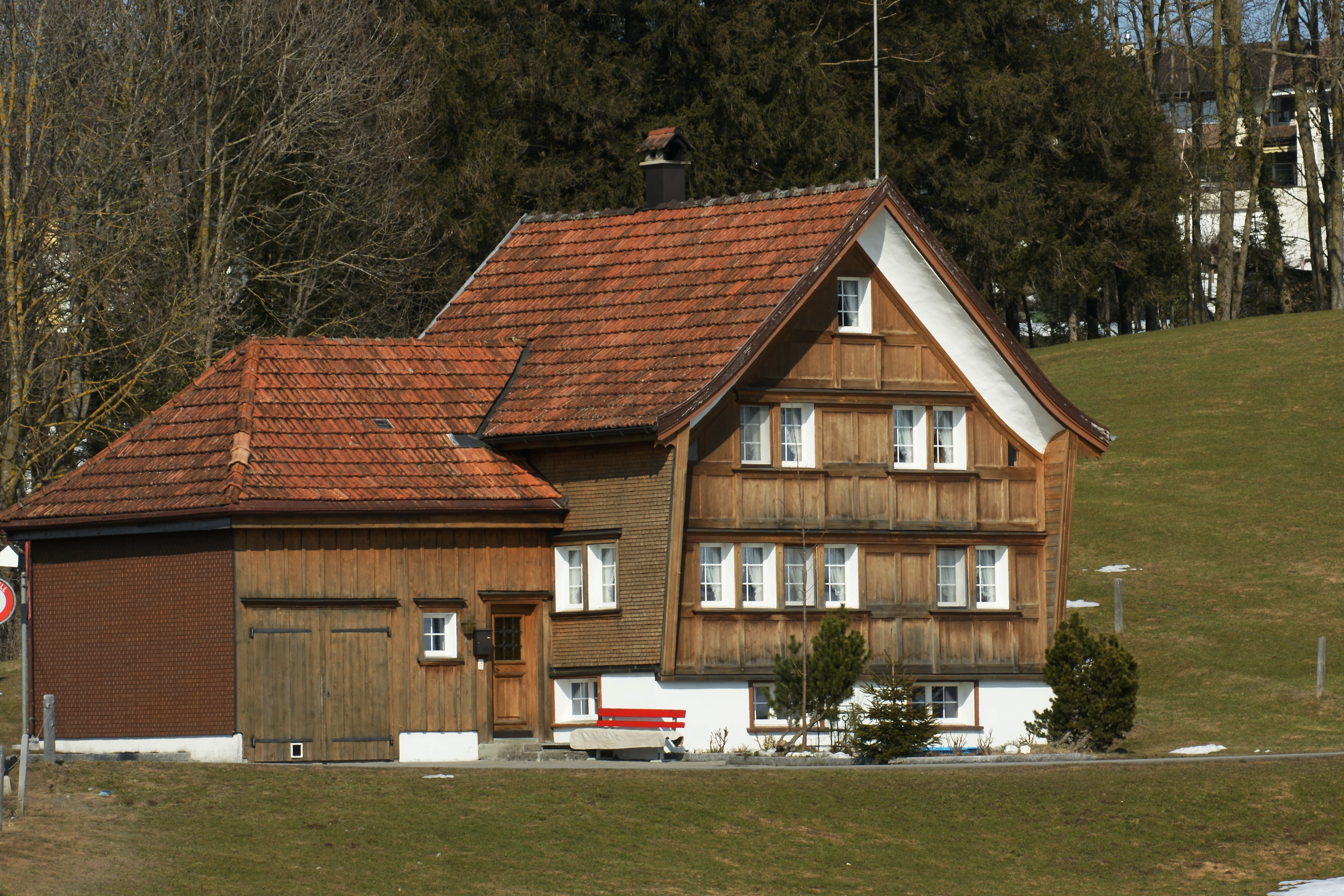
Rüte Appenzell I.r.

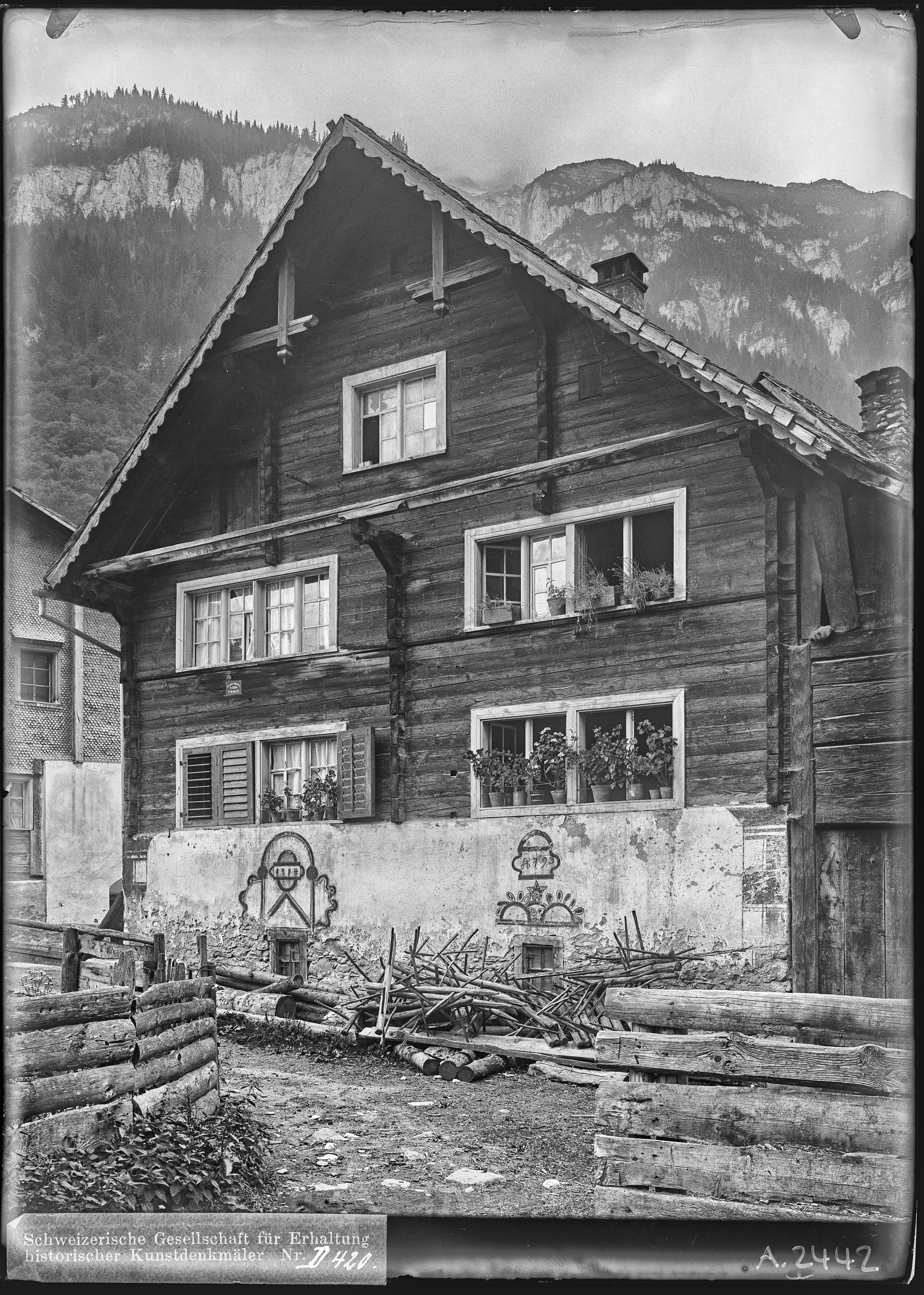
Pfäfers, St. Gallen

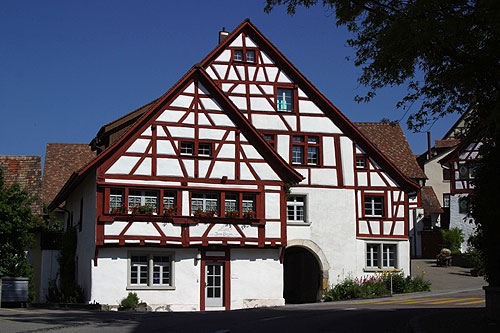
Thayngen, Schaffhausen

=== Alpine foothills ===
In the foothills of the Alps cattle breeding and dairy farming were common after the second half of the 13th century, which led to a different style. Unlike the more northern byre-dwelling, here the house and barn remained separate. Generally, they were each built as simple block structures made of heavy, square beams. The gable ends often have a windows and are protected by large eaves. In the Bernese Oberland the gable ends are often richly decorated. The design remained basically unchanged from the 12th century until the 19th, and is still built today. There is no clearly defined border between the byre-dwellings of the Swiss Plateau and the separate structures of the foothills so both designs may be present in a single village.

Traditional buildings Alpine foothills
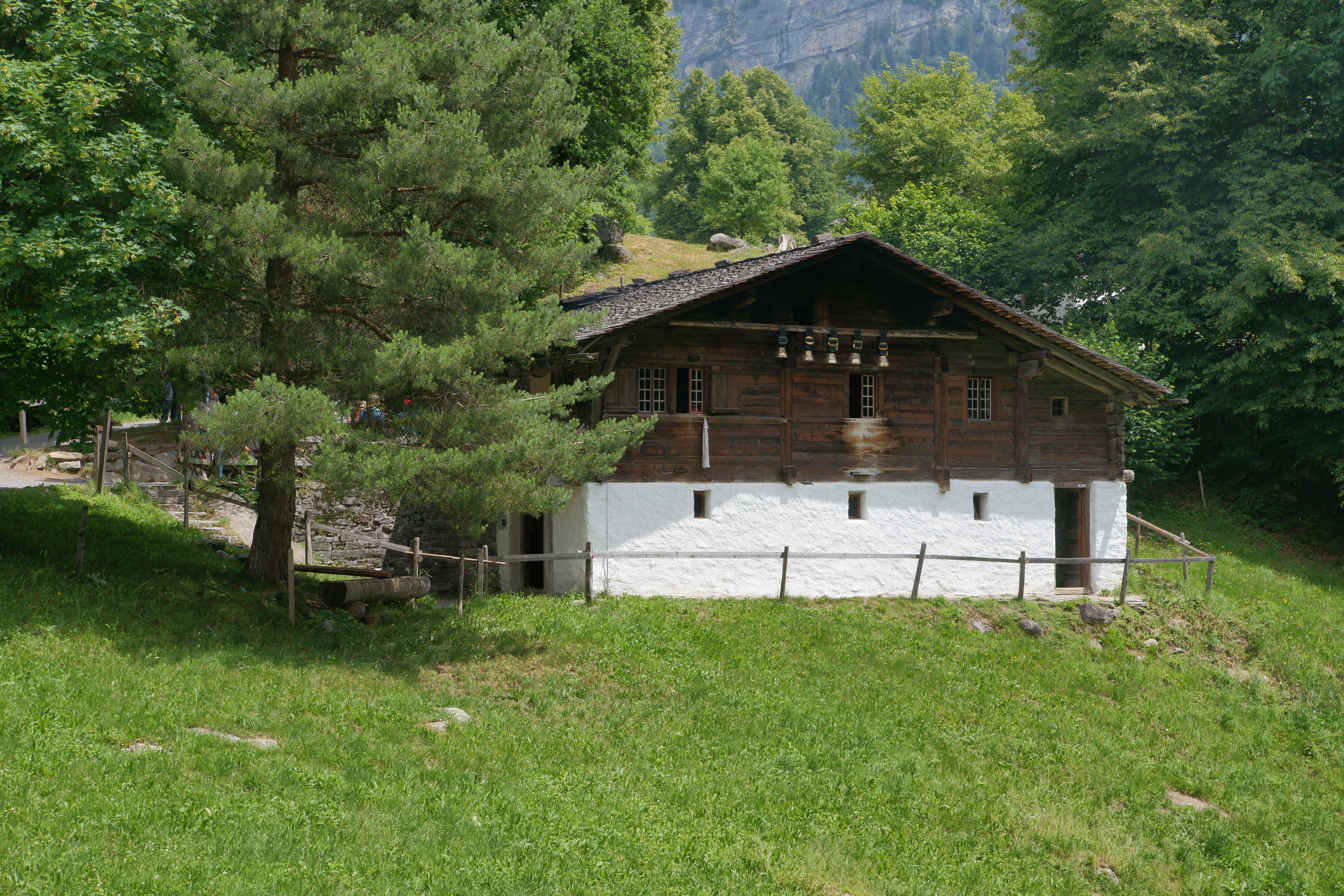
Alpine dairy, Kandersteg, Bern

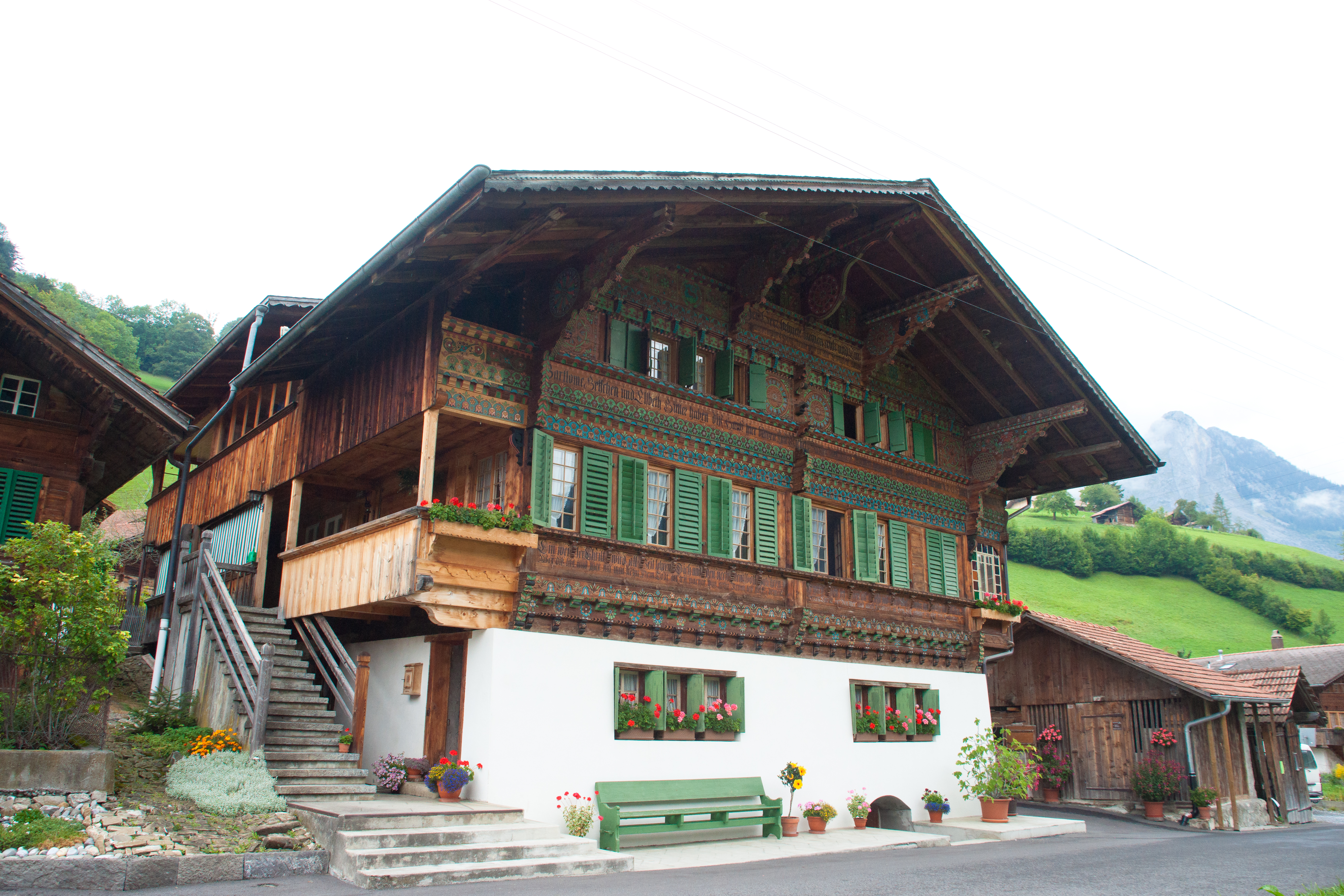
Boltigen, Bern

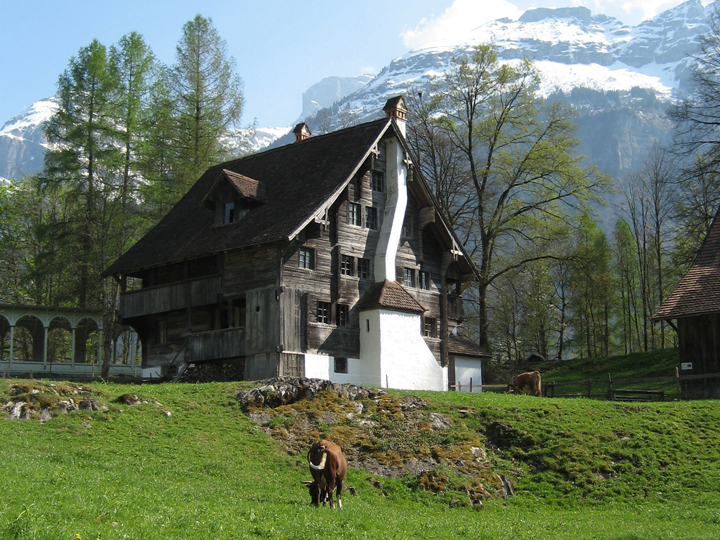
Sachseln, Obwalden

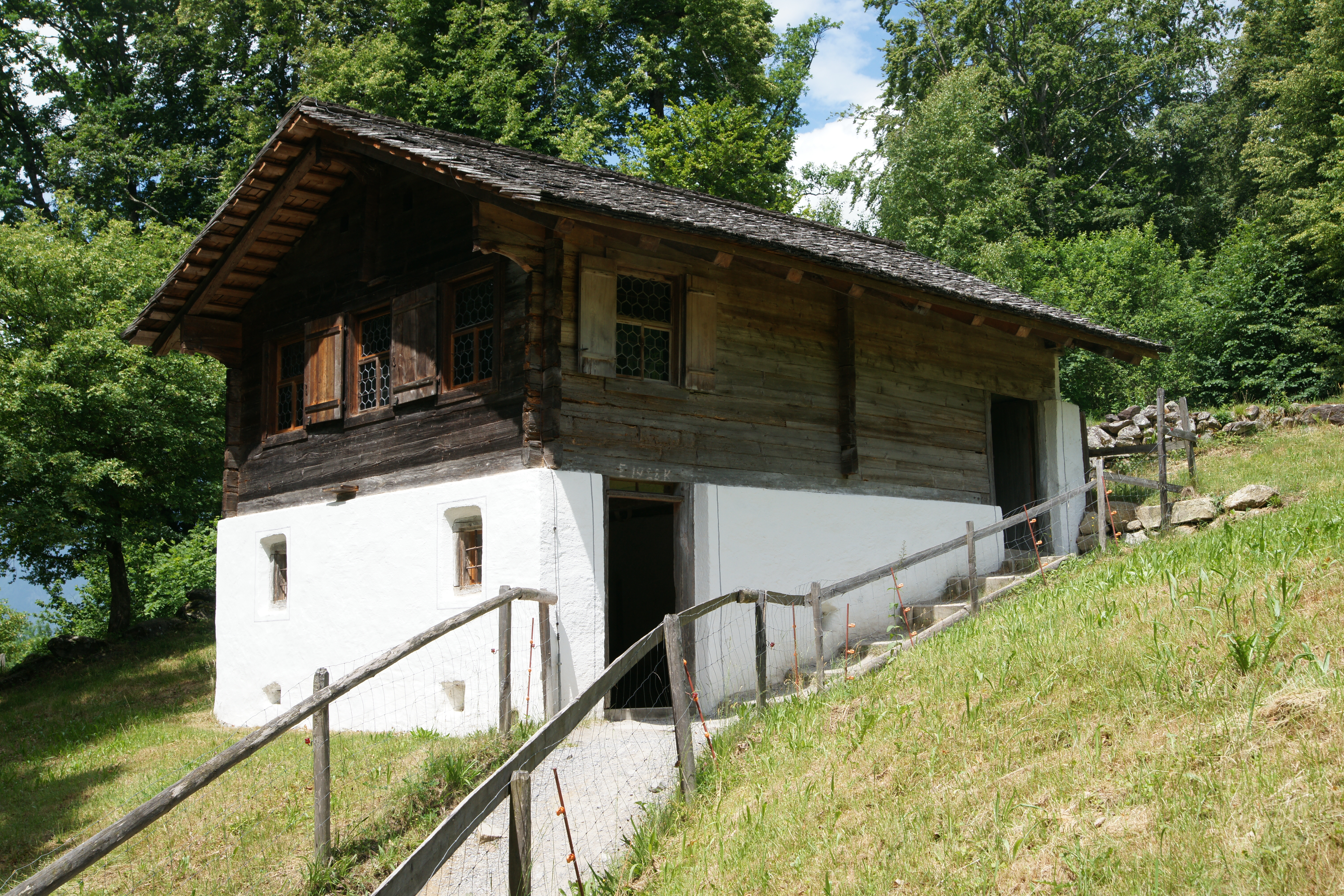
Buochs, Nidwalden

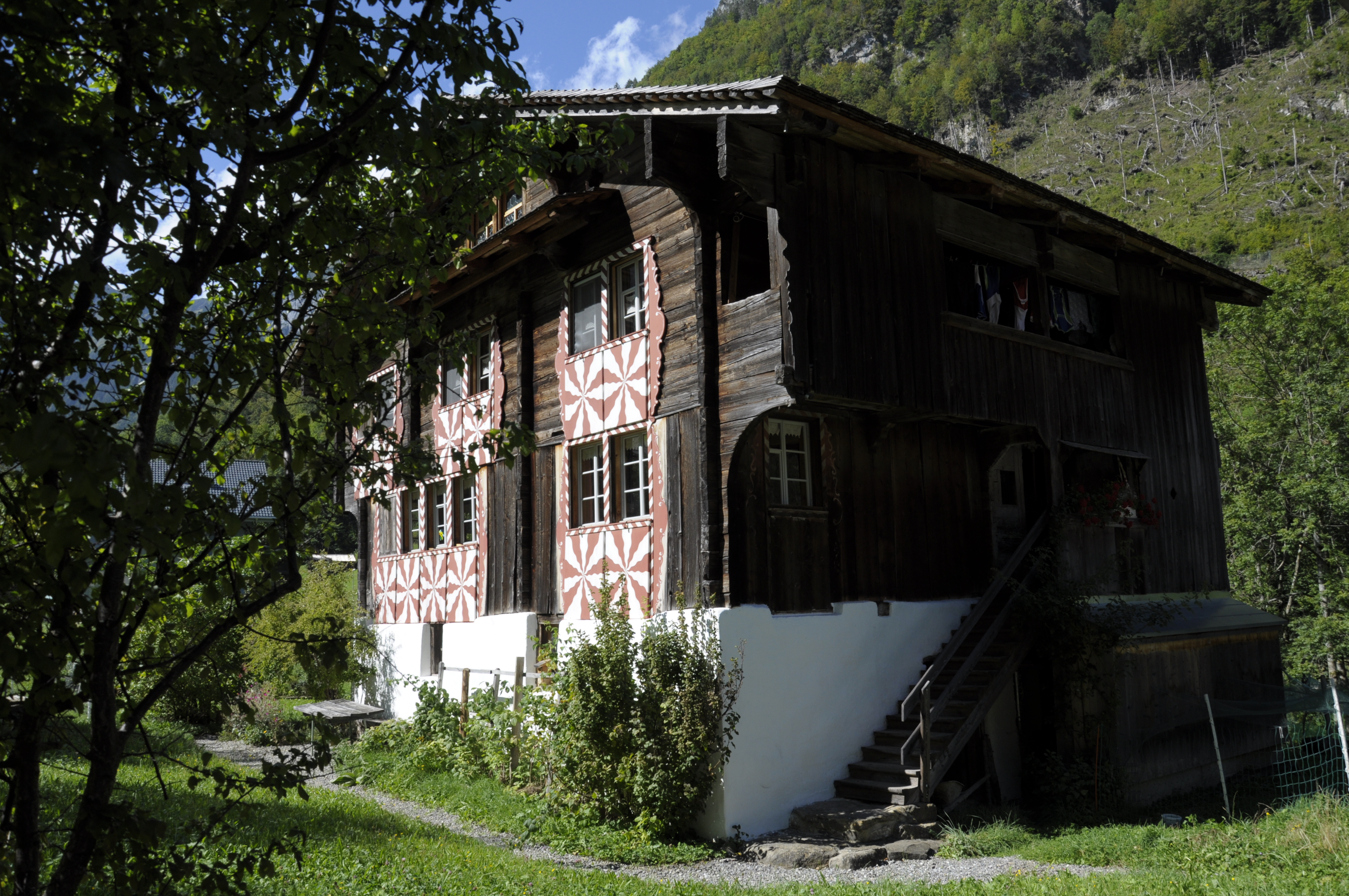
Isenthal, Uri

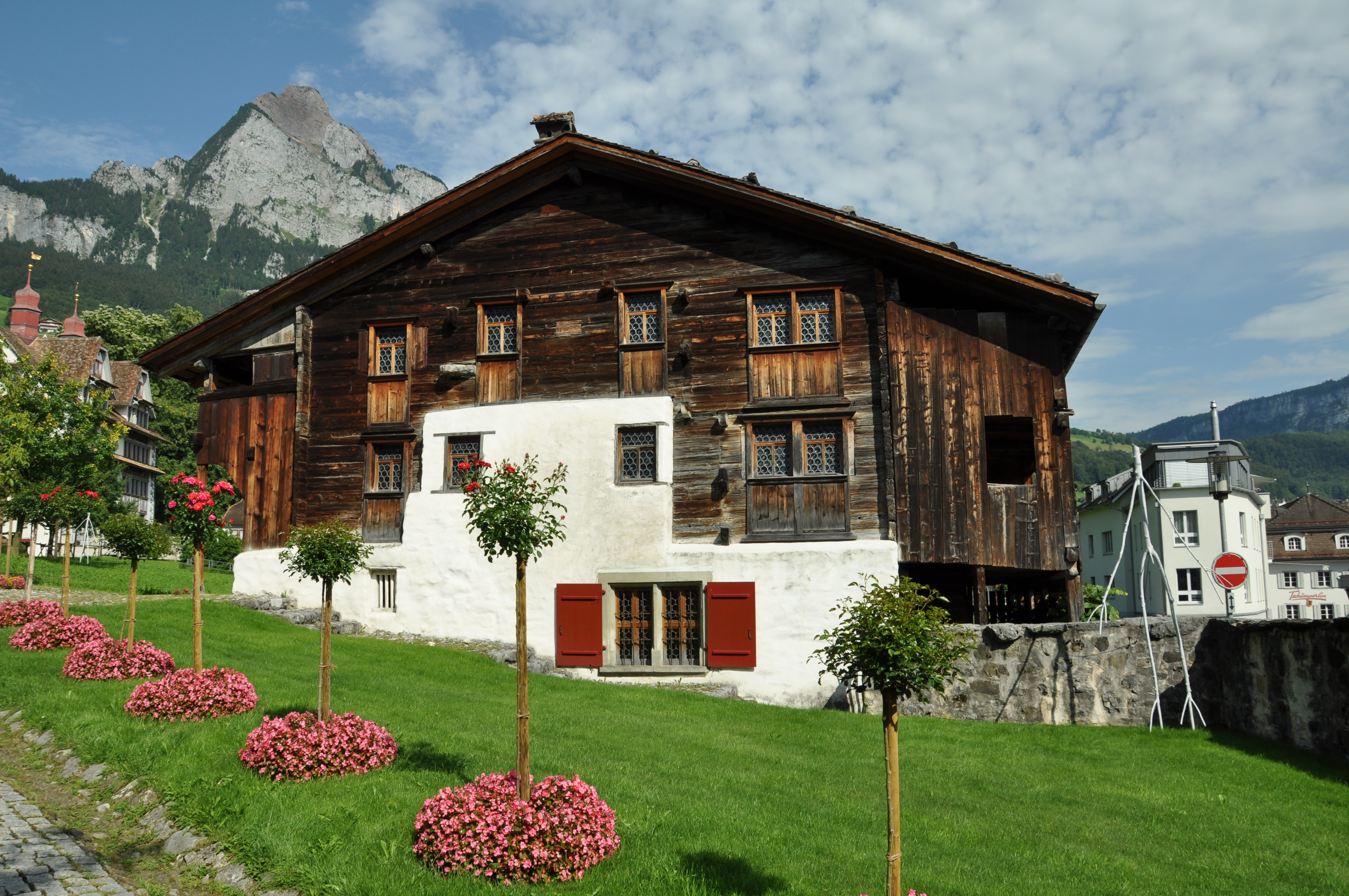
Haus Bethlehem, Schwyz (Europe's oldest wooden house)

=== Valais ===
In Valais the entire valley was originally French speaking until the 13th century when upper valley was settled by German speaking colonists. This led to differing architectural styles as well as extensive borrowing from the other culture. In the French speaking part, stone construction is much more common, while in the German speaking area, wooden beam styles dominate. However, in the Val d'Illiez region the houses are generally wooden, but with a distinctive roof ridge that projects much further forward than the bottom of the roof.

Traditional buildings of Valais
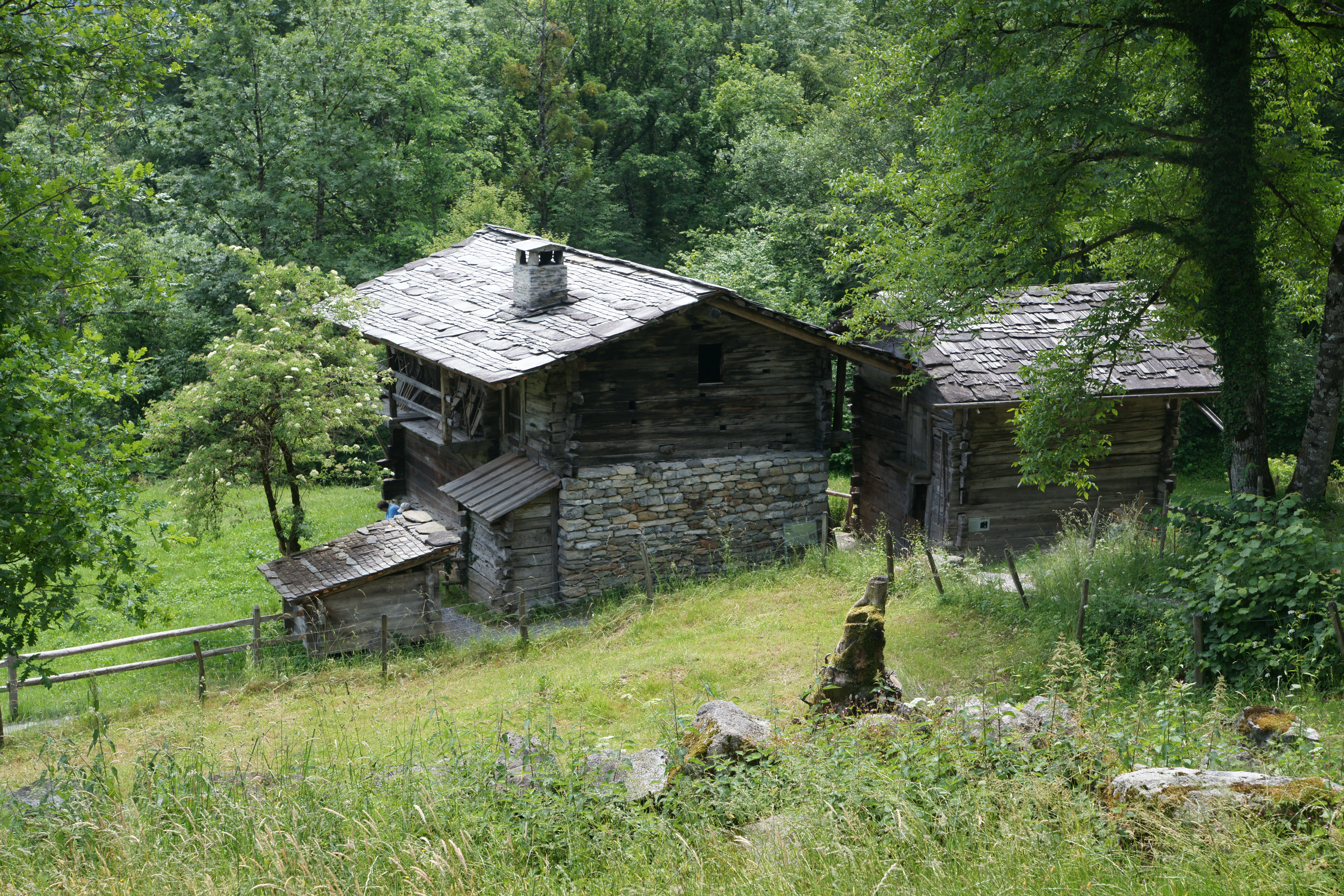
Blatten, Valais

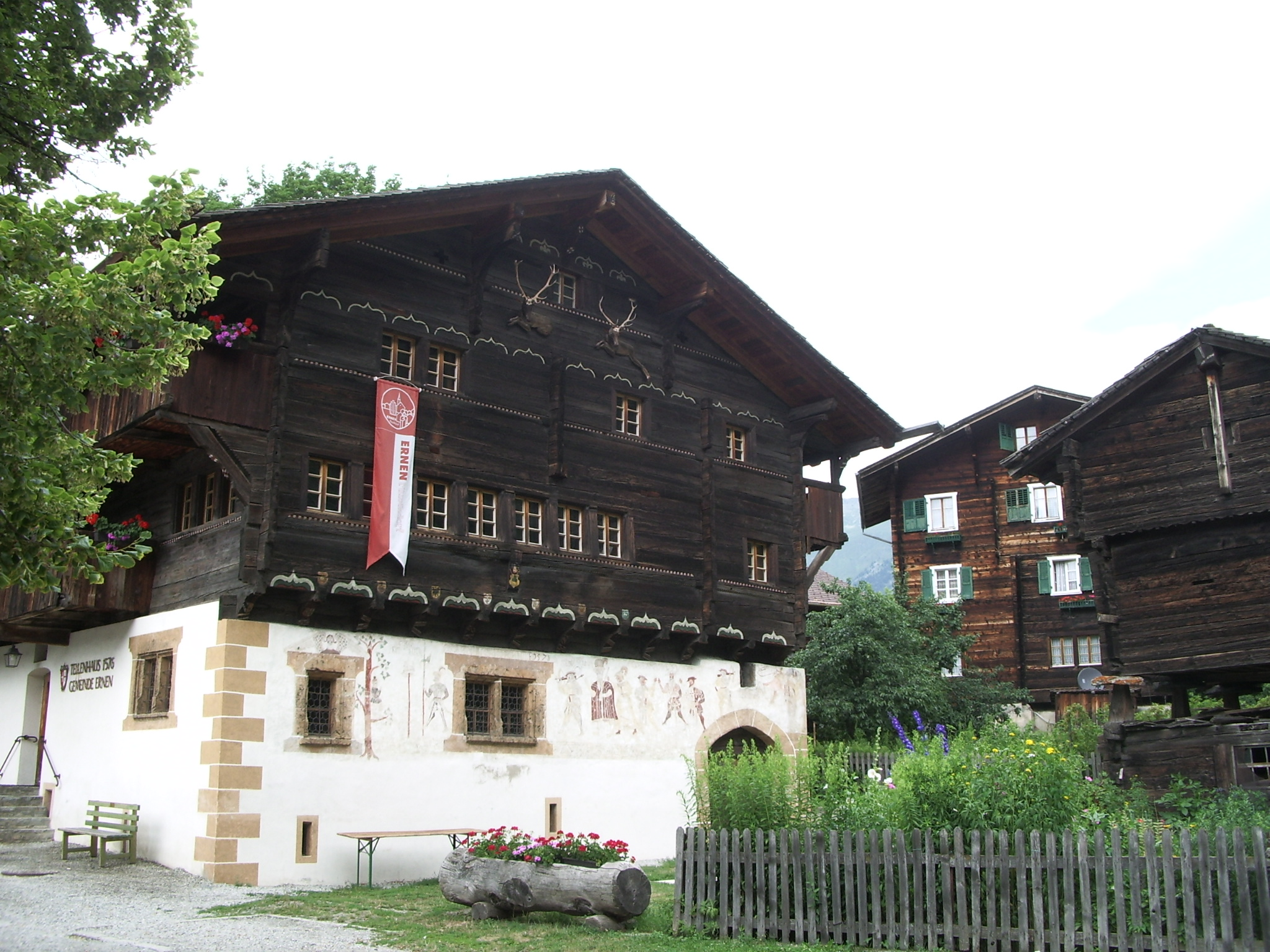
Ernen, Valais

=== Ticino ===
The modern Canton of Ticino was an Italian province conquered by the Old Swiss Confederation in the 15th century. The local architecture is more similar to that of northern Italy, though each small, isolated valley developed their own style. The southernmost parts of the Canton the villages are small and compact while the farms are isolated, sprawling stone and wood complexes that developed over centuries as apartments, storage and production buildings were added. In the northern part, narrow alpine valleys limit the size of fields and villages. Northern Ticino was conquered and administered by Uri, Schwyz and Nidwalden. These foreign overlords brought the wooden block construction from the Alpine foothills into Ticino. In the last 200 years stone construction has replaced the earlier wooden structure in most villages in Ticino.

Traditional buildings of Ticino
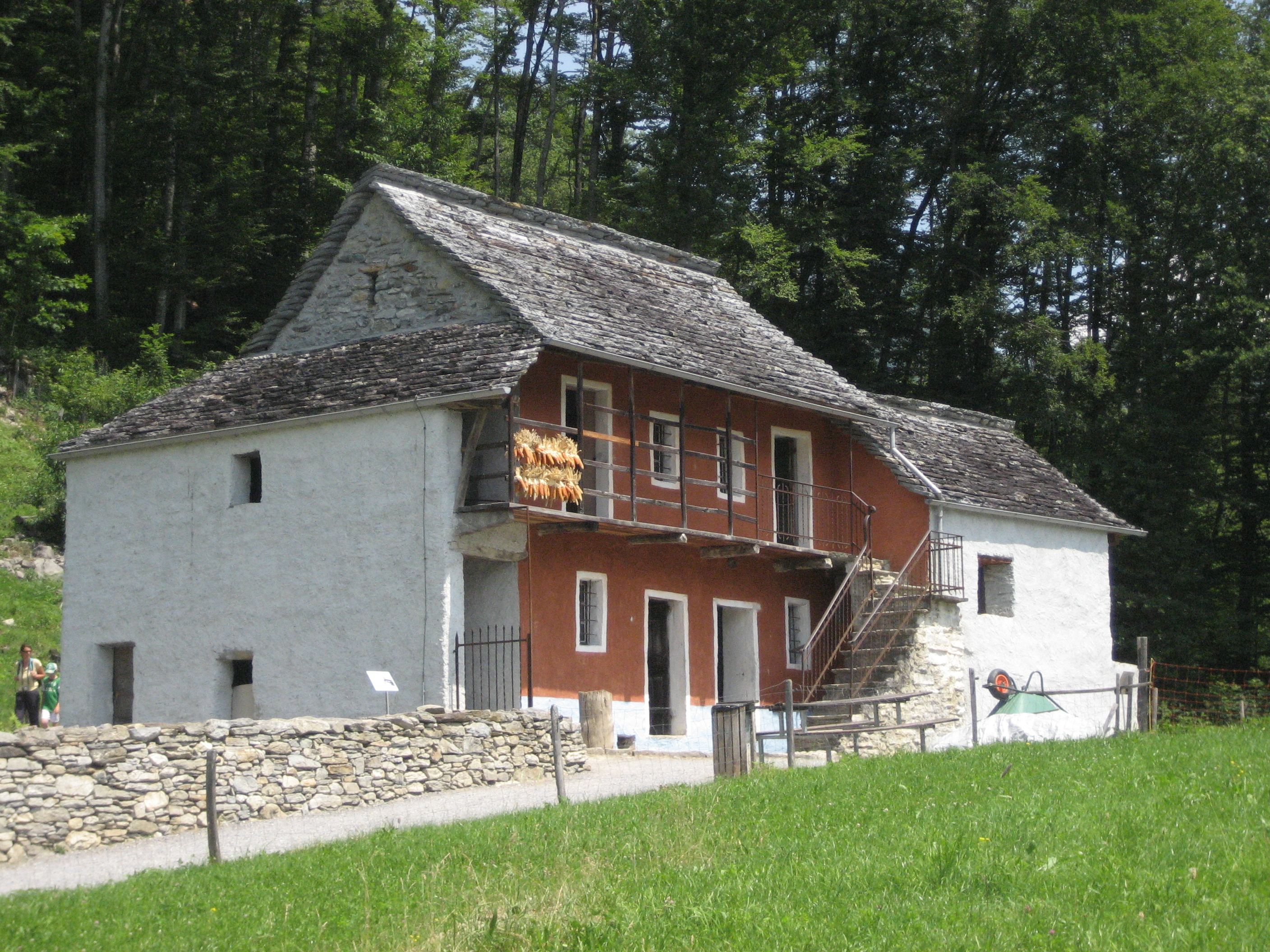
Cugnasco, Ticino

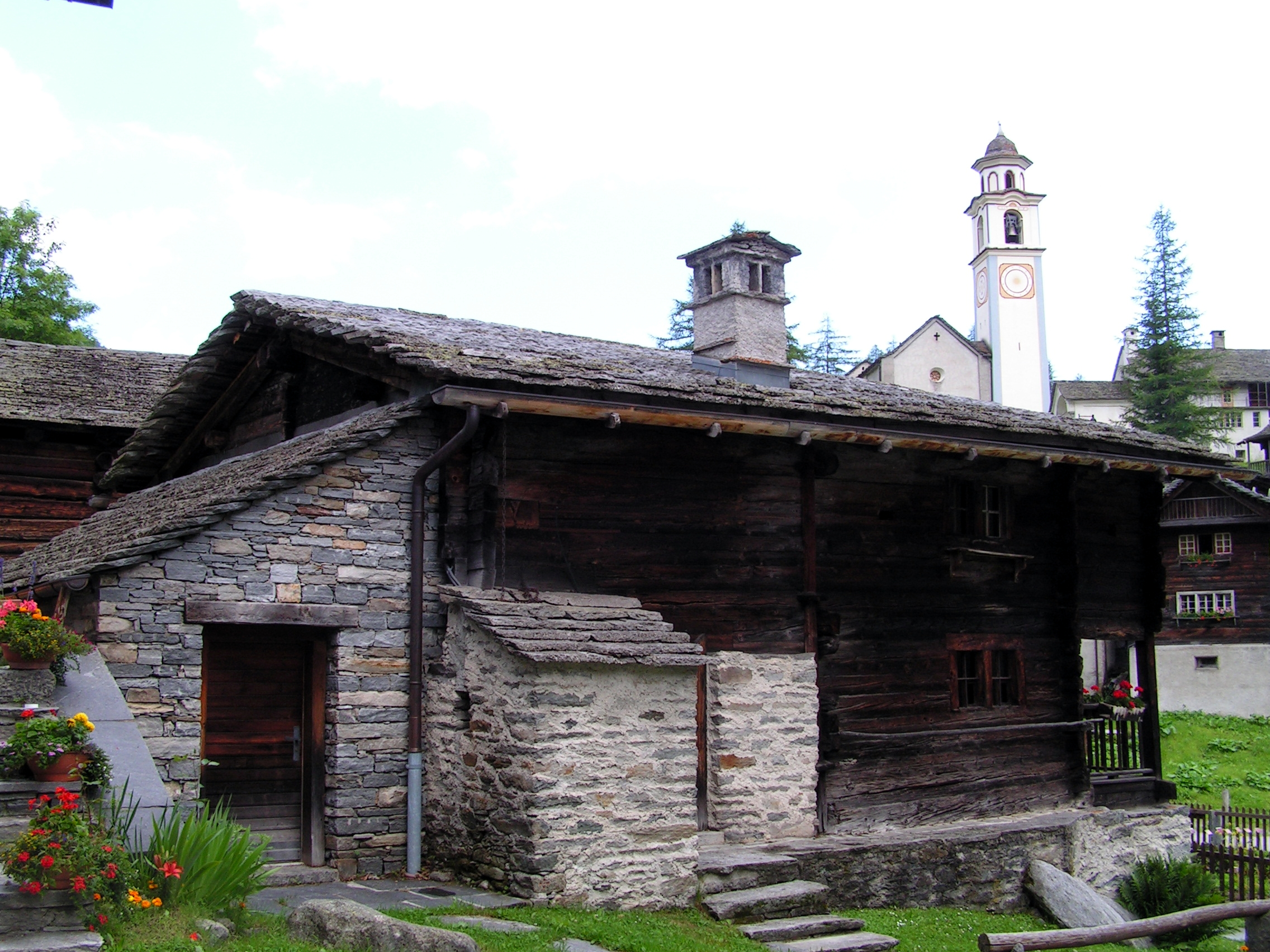
Bosco/Gurin, Ticino

=== Graubünden ===
Following the destruction of the local Bündner Wirren (part of the Thirty Years' War) in the 17th century, many of the houses in Graubünden had to be rebuilt. The new houses were built of stone, often on top of or surrounding an earlier wooden building. In the Engadin valley they built stone byre-dwellings, typically with a Sulèr, a wide passage through the residential section into the hay storage section. The kitchen, dining and storage rooms were branched off the Sulèr. The upper story included a large hall known as the Stuva süra as well as bedrooms. The basement housed the stables. Many of the houses were decorated with sgraffiti.

Traditional buildings of Graubünden
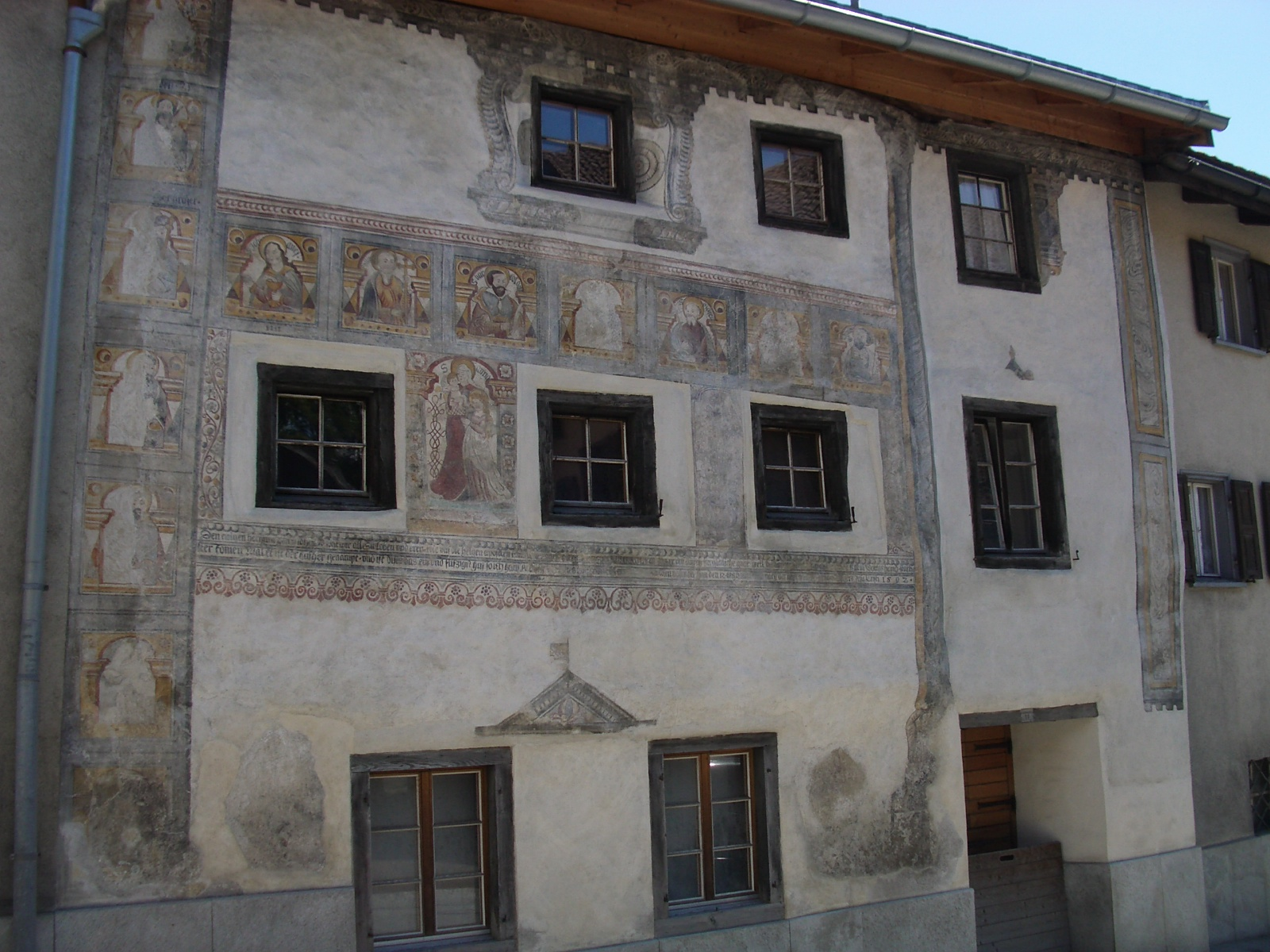
Lantsch/Lenz, Graubünden

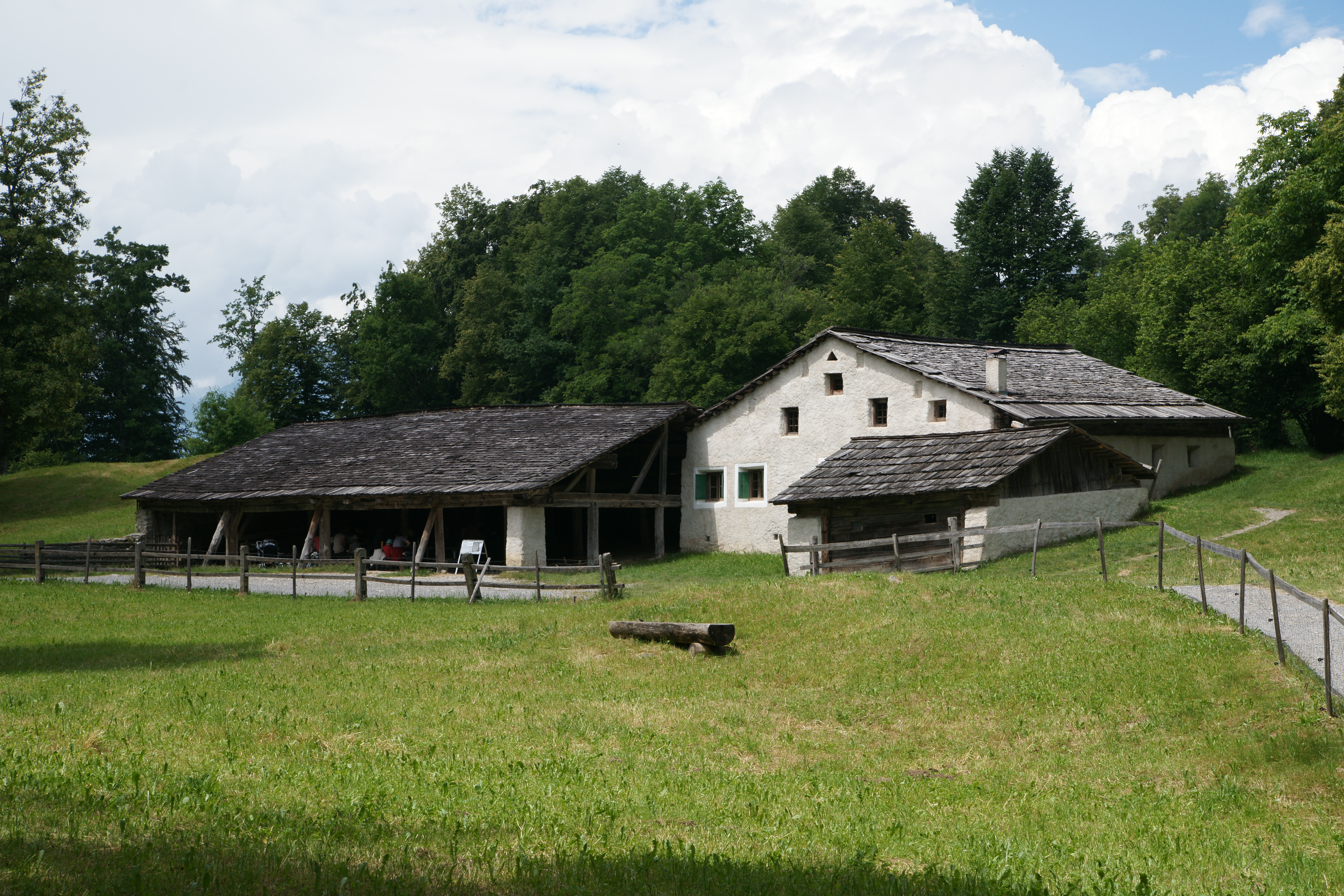
Herdsman's cottage in Alp Champatsch, Valchava, Graubünden

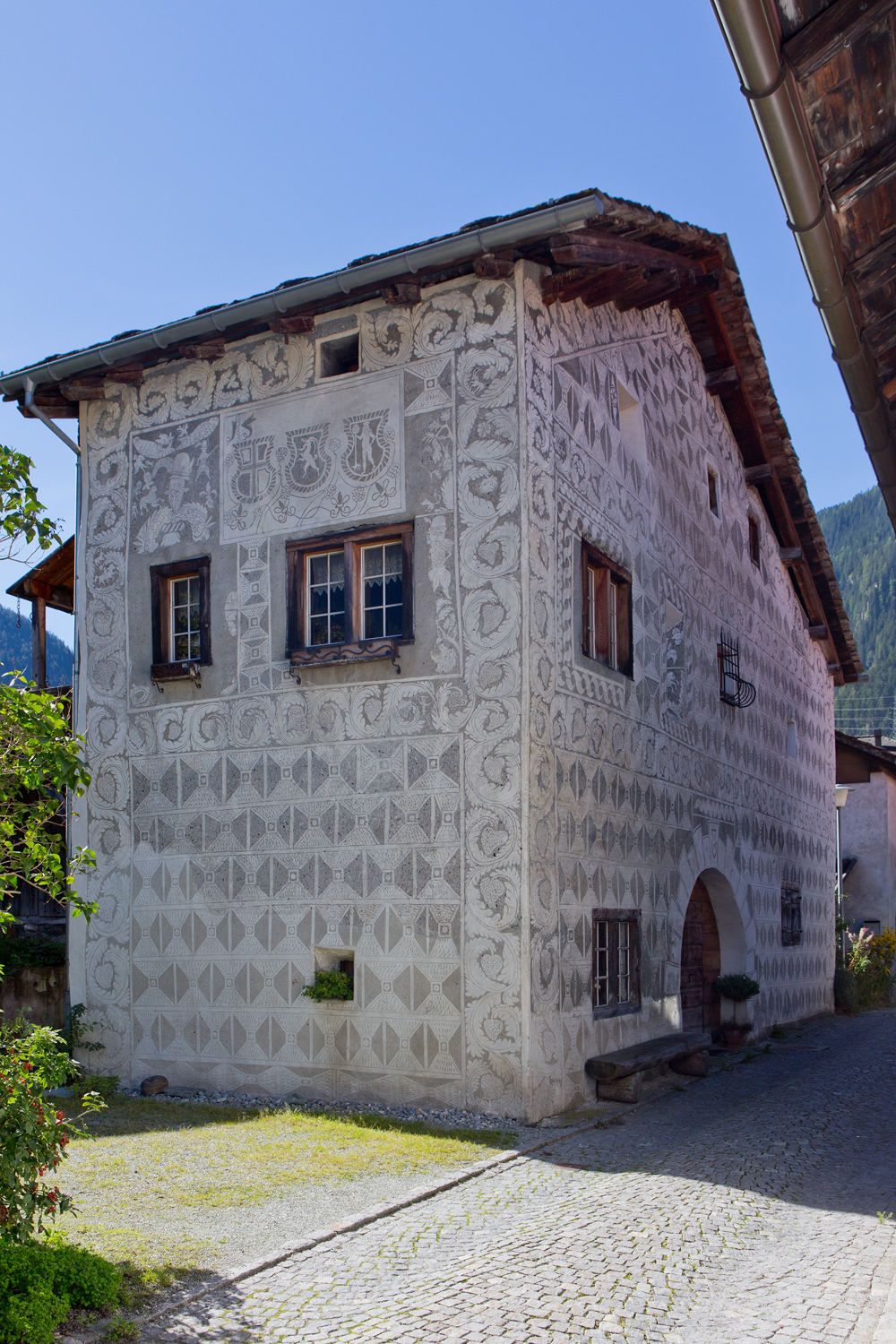
Andeer, Graubünden

== See also ==
- List of Swiss architects
- Swiss Architecture Museum
- Ballenberg
- Swiss Chalet Revival architecture
- Swiss Inventory of Cultural Property of National and Regional Significance
- World Heritage Sites in Switzerland

== Sources ==
- Tietz, Jürgen (1999). The Story of Architecture of the 20th century. Konemann. ISBN 3-8290-2045-7.
