= Léon Gallet =

Swiss watchmaker (1832–1899)

Léon L. Gallet
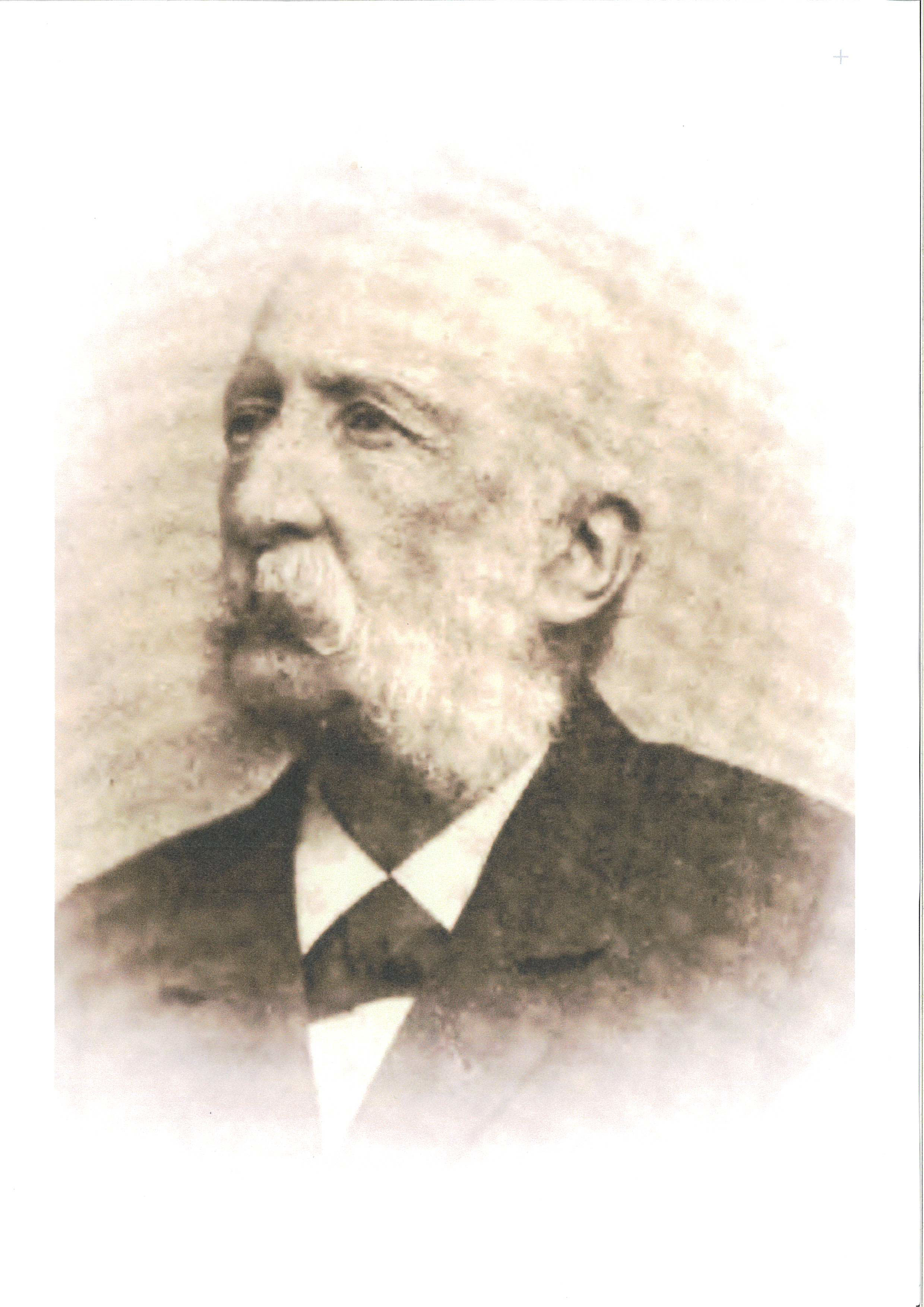
- Born: 31 December 1832; La Chaux-de-Fonds, Switzerland
- Died: 9 May 1899 (aged 66)
- Resting place: La Chaux-de-Fonds, Switzerland
- Occupation: watchmaker / entrepreneur / philanthropist
- Known for: timekeeping innovations
- Predecessor: Julien Gallet
- Children: Henriette Gallet-Courvoisier; Julien Gallet; Georges Gallet (1865-1946); Louis Gallet (1873-1955)

Léon Louis Gallet (1832–1899), watchmaker, entrepreneur, philanthropist, and past family patriarch of the Gallet Watch Company of Switzerland, is considered as one of the primary architects and founders of the 19th century industrialization of the Swiss watchmaking industry.

== Life ==
The son of Julien Gallet (1806–1849), who moved the family watchmaking business from Geneva, Switzerland, to the manufacturing district of La Chaux-de-Fonds in 1826, Léon L. Gallet was responsible for the creation of numerous Swiss and American watch brands. Among these was the prestigious Fabrique Electa, which became the upscale line of the jewelry department at Macy's Department store in New York City during the first quarter of the 20th century. Léon L. Gallet also established the brands National Park, Continental Watch Company, Jerome Park, Bridgeport, Eureka, Commodore, Union Square, and Lady Racine. While the appearance and function of many of Gallet's timepieces were tailored to the tastes of the American consumers, all of the movements in these watches were manufactured in Switzerland.

Léon Gallet played a philanthropic role in the business, cultural, and social life of his native home. As well as his prominent position as a member of both the legislature of Neuchâtel and the Council of La Chaux-de-Fonds, he was for many years, the president of the Société des Amis des Arts (Fine Arts Society) and Grand Master of the Free Masons. Together with Louis & Jules Courvoisier, Ernest Francillon of Longines, and Constant Girard-Perregaux, Léon Gallet founded the Société Intercantonale des Industries du Jura (Intercantonal Society for the Industries of the Jura Area) in 1876. The purpose of this organization was to assist in the promotion and distribution of products from Switzerland's Watch Valley while addressing the growing threat of competition in European markets from American watch manufacturers.

Upon his death in 1899, Léon Gallet bequeathed a sum of 43,000 Swiss Francs (today equivalent to 1,000,000 Swiss Francs or approx. 1,000,000 US dollars) to his hometown of La Chaux-de-Fonds, of which 25,000 Swiss Francs were earmarked to build the Musée International d'Horlogerie (International Watch Making Museum). Donated by Léon Gallet's son Georges, the museum's collection was started with a body of over 100 of Gallet's most complicated and valuable timepieces, including the world's first wristwatch produced for mass consumption in 1892. The balance of the bequeathed funds was used to construct the Musée des beaux-arts de La Chaux-de-Fonds (Beaux Arts Museum of La-Chaux-de-Fonds), designed by renowned painter Charles l’Eplattenier and architect René Chapallaz, Le Corbusier's architecture teacher.

Prior to his passing, Léon Gallet commissioned René Chapallaz, to design "Villa Gallet". Situated in "Parc Gallet" in the southern part of La Chaux-de-Fonds, "Villa Gallet" still retains its original name and is considered as an important historic contribution to the Swiss Art Nouveau movement of the late 19th century.

== Léon L. Gallet & The Industrialization of the Swiss Watch Industry ==
Any study of the 19th century industrialization of Switzerland’s "Watch Valley" is not complete without mentioning the role of watchmaker and entrepreneur, Léon L. Gallet.

In the years following America's Civil War, a powerful shift of that country's concentration moved from agriculture to industry. With this shift came great advancements in manufacturing as centrally located factories replaced small workshops, and large scale production of items with interchangeable parts quickly displaced less efficient hand-crafting. An immediate beneficiary of this progress was America's watch and clock industry, as northern coal powered factories began turning out hundreds of high quality timepieces per day. On the horizon for these newly empowered companies was the inevitable expansion beyond domestic borders to embark in direct competition with the Swiss watchmaking industry.

Léon L. Gallet and Ernest Francillon of Longines, two Swiss watchmakers who were actively selling their wares in North America, saw the writing on the wall. Recognizing the only way that the small workshops of Switzerland's "Watch Valley" could compete against the growing threat posed by larger American manufacturers was to unite. At the prompting of Gallet and Francillon, a new organization was created. The Société Intercantonale des Industries du Jura (Intercantonal Society of the Jura Industries) was formed to bring together the individual strengths of the region's numerous independent watchmaking houses as a powerful cooperative entity.

Yet, in spite of the formation of this new organization, the warnings of Gallet and Francillon were met with skepticism by the other members of the group. Decades of success as the world's primary supplier of fine timepieces had resulted in a self-assured complacency within Switzerland’s watchmaking industry.

Then on 10 May 1876, the great Philadelphia International Exhibition, created to celebrate the 100th anniversary of the signing of America's Declaration of Independence, opened to the public. Among the many displays was the indisputable evidence of the manufacturing superiority of such American companies as Waltham and Elgin, each capable of finishing many hundred watches per day.

Jacques David, Swiss watchmaker and machine designer, was dispatched to America by Ernest Francillon to witness the exhibitions first-hand, and report his findings back to the Intercanonal Society. Léon L. Gallet followed shortly behind, arriving in Philadelphia the next month. What both men witnessed at the exhibition further confirmed the concerns of Gallet and Francillon.

On his return to Switzerland in November, Jacques David wrote a long detailed report on the men's findings to the Intercantonal Society of the Jura Industries. While David's report helped to wake the Swiss watchmaking industry from its comfortable complacency, increased revenues were needed for the Society's members to initiate the developments required to meet these new challenges.

By the time that the Philadelphia Exposition opened to the public in 1876, Léon L. Gallet had already established sales offices in both New York City and Chicago, going back over ten years. He had personally suffered a number of long ocean voyages to deliver his wares and to conduct business. Besides his acute knowledge of the growing threat posed by worldwide competition from US manufactures, Gallet understood the tastes of the American consumer and the opportunities the new world also held for the Jura watchmakers.

With the now available joint resources from fellow manufacturing members of the Intercantonal Society, Gallet decided to take the competitive battle directly to the enemy. Not only could the rapidly expanding base of American consumers provide opportunities for increased sales of Swiss watches, these sales could provide the needed revenues to meet the expected competitive challenges in Europe.

Utilizing his own movements, as well as components by such friends as Auguste Agassiz, Ernest Francillon, Constant Girard-Perregaux, Jules Jeanneret, and Louis and Jules Courvoisier, Gallet began production of 30 new watch brands, most designed specifically to appeal to the taste of the America consumer.

Within a short period, exports of Swiss watches to America rapidly increased, greatly expanding the reach of watchmakers whose previous market was limited only to the local economies. As a result, Leon L. Gallet's American marketing activities helped to provide the needed capital for the watchmakers of the Jura region to industrialize, and successfully meet one of the greatest challenges in Swiss timekeeping's history.

== Léon L. Gallet Gallery ==
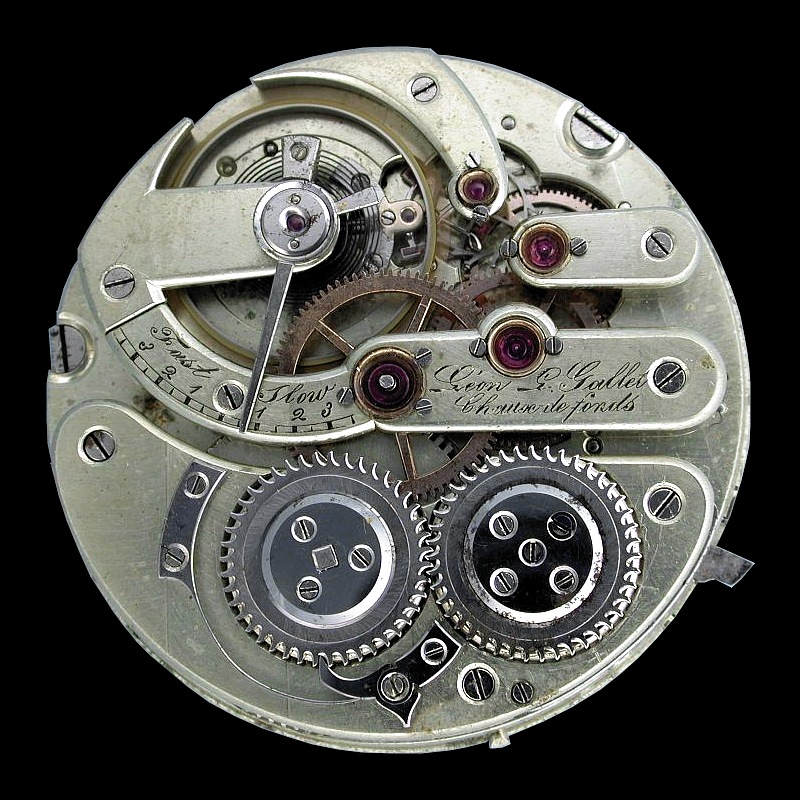
Extra fine pocket watch movement by Léon L. Gallet (ca. 1879) – bi-metallic temperature compensation balance, Breguet style over-coil hairspring, patent chronometer regulator, solid gold jewel settings, wolf tooth winding, jeweled to the center.

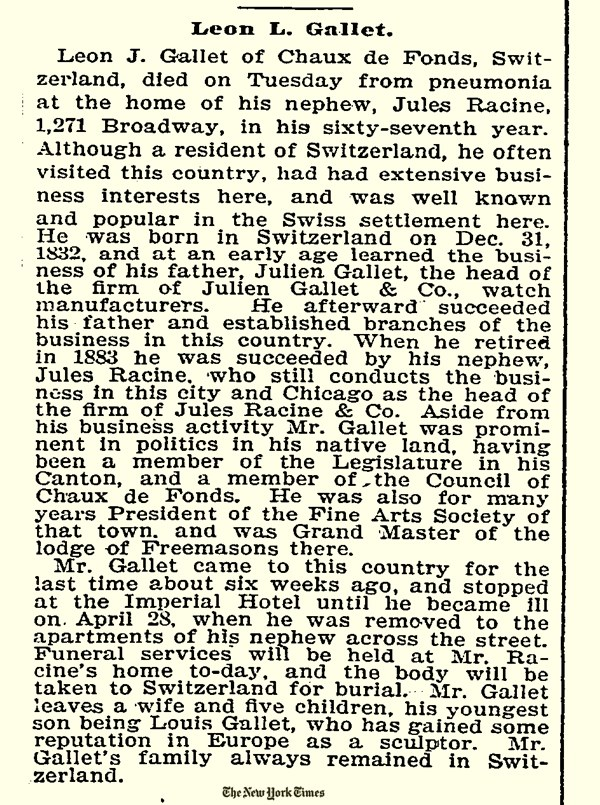
Leon. L. Gallet Obituary - The New York Times, 11 May 1899
