= Charles Tayler =

Charles Tayler may refer to:

- Charles Foot Tayler (1794–1853), English painter of portrait miniatures
- Charles Benjamin Tayler (1797–1875), Church of England clergyman and writer
