= Villa Fallet =

House by Le Corbusier in La Chaux-de-Fonds, Switzerland

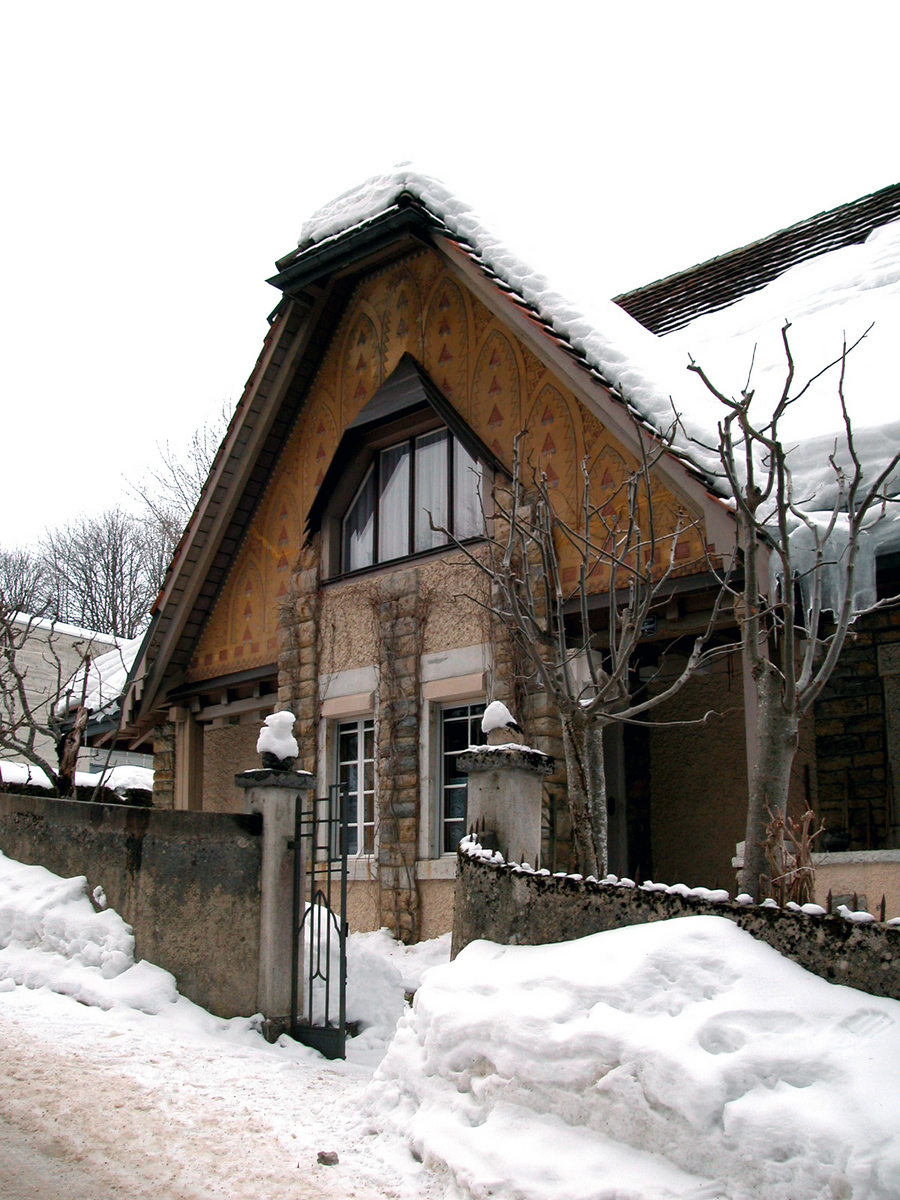
- Interactive map of the Villa Fallet area

General information
- Location: Switzerland, 1 Chemin de Pouillerel, La Chaux-de-Fonds
- Coordinates: 47.105067°N 6.816687°E
- Completed: 1906

Design and construction
- Architect: Le Corbusier

Villa Fallet is a traditional chalet located in La Chaux-de-Fonds, Switzerland designed and built by the eighteen-year-old Charles-Édouard Jeanneret (1887–1965), who later became better known as Le Corbusier. Jeanneret was teaching himself architecture by going to the library to read about architecture and philosophy, by visiting museums, by sketching buildings, and by constructing them. In 1905, he and two other students, under the supervision of their teacher, René Chapallaz, designed and built his first house, the Villa Fallet, for the engraver Louis Fallet, a friend of another of his teachers, Charles l'Eplattenier. The house is in the Style Sapin, the Swiss variant of Art Nouveau.

The chalet on the forested hillside near La Chaux-de-Fonds, is a large traditional chalet with a steep roof in the local alpine style, and is decorated with carefully crafted colored geometric patterns on the façade, with a design of triangular pine trees and pine cones. The success of this house led to his construction of two similar houses, the Villas Jacquemet and Stotzer, in the same area. It was completed in 1905. It is now recognised as a building of cultural significance in Switzerland.

== Bibliography ==
- Journel, Guillemette Morel (2015). Le Corbusier- Construire la Vie Moderne (in French). Editions du Patrimoine: Centre des Monument Nationaux. ISBN 978-2-7577-0419-6.
