= Charles Benjamin Tayler =

English clergyman and writer (1797–1875)

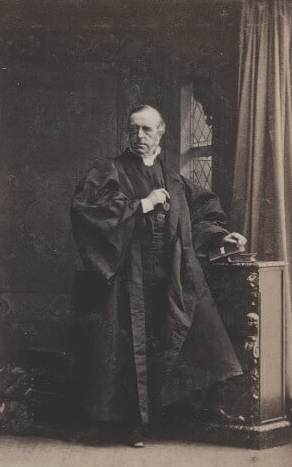
Charles Benjamin Tayler, 1861 photograph

Charles Benjamin Tayler (1797–1875) was a Church of England clergyman and writer for the young.

== Family background ==
The son of John Tayler (or Taylor), a Member of Parliament, and his wife Elizabeth, he was born at Leytonstone, Essex on 16 September 1797 and baptised at St Botolph, Bishopsgate on 11 November that year. His mother Elizabeth Wood was daughter of Ralph Winstanley Wood; the couple were married in 1792 and had six sons and two daughters.

Charles's elder brother Ralph John Tayler (died 1866 at age 71) became a judge in India. Two other brothers were army officers in India, Arthur William Tayler (1807–1843) who died at Ludhiana, and Edward Tayler (1810–1834) who died at Hodnet rectory, where Charles was the incumbent.

John Tayler, an East Indies agent, died in 1820. He was in partnership with Edmund Boehm (died 1822) in the firm of Boehm & Tayler; he left his property in trust with Boehm. The firm later became bankrupt.

== Early life ==
Charles Tayler was educated at the Royal Grammar School, Guildford under the Rev. William Hodgson Cole. Cole was vicar of Wonersh, and in 1827, during the debate on nonconformist rights and Catholic emancipation, published a sermon The Claims of the Established Church.

Tayler was admitted a pensioner at Corpus Christi College, Cambridge in 1813. After an interval, he matriculated at Trinity College, as a fellow commoner, on 23 October 1815, graduating B.A. in 1819 and M.A. in 1822.

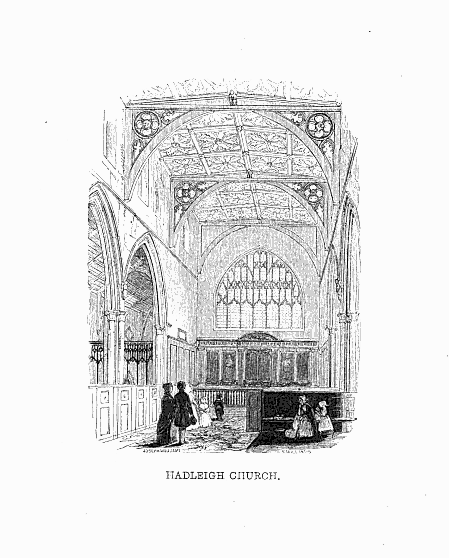
Woodcut of the interior view of St Mary's Church, Hadleigh, by Joseph Lionel Williams, 1853 illustration to Tayler's 1853 book Memorials of the English Martyrs

In 1821 Tayler was ordained deacon by John Kaye. He was licensed that year to a curacy at St Mary's Church, Hadleigh, where the rector was Edward Hay-Drummond, who had been chaplain in ordinary to George III. There he adopted strong Protestant views, and hostility to Roman Catholicism. He was ordained priest in 1823 by William Howley.

Tayler left Hadleigh in 1826, for a curacy in Kent. In 1828 he became curate at Long Ditton in Surrey, where the rector was Brian Broughton; and then had a curacy in Hampshire. From 1831 to 1836 he had the sole charge of the parish of Hodnet in Shropshire.

== Chester ==
In 1836 John Bird Sumner, bishop of Chester, presented Tayler to the living of St. Peter's in Chester. He was also evening lecturer at St. Mary's, a large church in which he usually preached to 1200.

While at Chester Tayler published from 1838 a series of Tracts for the Rich, with titles such as "The Gentleman and the Steward" and "An Ear-ring of Gold". He also edited a monthly publication, The Christian Beacon, from 1839 to 1841.

== Later life ==
Following a breakdown in his health, Tayler left Chester, and was in 1846 appointed rector of Otley, Suffolk, by William Nevill, 4th Earl of Abergavenny, through the good offices of John Tollemache. His nephew George Wood Henry Tayler (born in India, son of George Tayler) was an undergraduate at Trinity College, Cambridge from 1850, said to be "of pious evangelical antecedents". He was on good terms there with James Clerk Maxwell, and when Maxwell in 1853 was experiencing a personal and religious crisis, brought him to Otley to stay with the large Tayler family. A letter Maxwell wrote to Charles Benjamin Tayler in July of that year, from Cambridge, alludes to the care he had received:

I had got into habits with you of expecting things to happen, and if I wake at night I think the gruel is coming.

George Wood Henry Tayler went into the Church, and was a curate at Otley in 1855–7. In 1853 also, Tayler, as a "well-connected author of religious books", gave Sampson Low Jr a letter of introduction to Susan Warner.

Another nephew, Charles Stanley Tayler son of Ralph John Tayler, was educated at Otley, and was admitted to Gonville and Caius College, Cambridge in 1857 (having first been admitted to St John's College in 1856). He also went into the church, and was a curate at Otley in the 1860s.

Charles Benjamin Tayler resigned the Otley living shortly before his death. He died at Chapel House, Worthing on 16 October 1875. In 1876 the Religious Tract Society published a volume of his Personal Recollections, with an anonymous memoir.

== Works ==
Tayler was a prolific author. As a novelist, he has been classed as an evangelical author of anti-Catholic books, with Charlotte Anley, Anne Howard, Stephen Jenner, Lady Catharine Long and William Francis Wilkinson. The New York Times described his works as "intimately colored with High Church or Puseyite doctrines," and "pervaded with the spirit of the most zealous piety, and religious fervor." He wrote a preface to The Confessor: a Jesuit Tale of the Times, Founded on Fact (1854) by Elizabeth Hardy.

His works included:

- May You Like It, by a country curate (1822–3, 2 vols.), anonymous. The first volume was dedicated to his mother; the second explicitly to his maternal grandfather Ralph Winstanley Wood. Charles Lamb, on whom Tayler had called, wrote of it to Bernard Barton in 1824 "His Book I "like." It is only too stuft with scripture, too Parsonish."
- A Fireside Book, or, The account of a Christmas spent at Old court (1828), anonymous; a Christmas story, frontispiece by George Cruikshank.
- The Records of a Good Man's Life (1832, 2 vols.)
- Social Evils and Their Remedy, from 1833, part-published in eight parts, then reprinted in four volumes each containing two parts. The first part was The Mechanic.
- The Child of the Church of England (1834; new edit. 1852)
- Sermons Preached at Chester (1839)
- Edward, or almost an Owenite (1840)
- Dora Melder; a Tale of Alsace. A Translation (1842) by Meta Sander, editor. "Meta Sander" was the pseudonym of Margareta Spörlin, who published a German two-novella volume in 1839/40, the first novella being Die Unvermählten dealing with the Melder family of Alsace.
- Margaret, or, the Pearl (1844), novel.
- Tractarianism Not of God; Sermons (1844)
- Lady Mary: or, Not of the World (1845), fiction
- The Sacred Gift, a series of meditations upon Scripture subjects (1845, 1846), illustrated annual
- Thankfulness: A Narrative comprising Passages from the Diary of the Rev. Allan Temple (1848), fiction
- Mark Wilton, the Merchant's Clerk (1848), fiction
- Facts in a Clergyman's Life (1849)
- Sermons for all Seasons (1850)
- Earnestness: The Sequel to "Thankfulness" (1850), fiction
- The Angels' Song: A Christmas Token (1850), fiction
- Memorials of the English Martyrs (1853). A reviewer wrote "Mr. Taylor [sic] gives the testimony of Fuller and Dr. Blunt to the truth of Foxe's great work, with which he entirely agrees."
- Truth: or, Persis Clareton. A Narrative of Church History in the Seventeenth Century (1853), fiction
- Legends and Records, chiefly historical (1854)
- The Fool's Pence, and Other Narratives of Every-day Life (1859), fiction
- The Tongue of the Swearer: a Suffolk Story (1861)
- The Race Course and its Accompaniments (1867)
- Found at Eventide: the true Story of a young Village Infidel (1870), fiction, Religious Tract Society
- Sacred Records, etc. in Verse (1872).

== Family ==
In 1822 Tayler married Aldine Agassiz, daughter of the merchant Arthur Lewis David Agassiz of Finsbury Square and his wife Susanne Prevost Rouviere (see Agassiz family).
