= Ernest Francillon =

Swiss entrepreneur and watchmaker

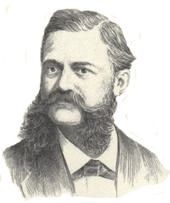
Ernest Francillon

Ernest Francillon (1834 – 3 April 1900) was the Swiss manager of Longines watches and an entrepreneur. He was the nephew of Auguste Agassiz.

Francillon was born in Lausanne in 1834. He studied in his birth town, Vevey and Stuttgart. He subsequently became an apprentice watchmaker in Val-de-Travers. He founded the Longines company in 1866. During the final decades of the 19th century he set up a modern watch factory and undertook action to remain competitive against producers in the United States.

He died on 3 April 1900 in Saint-Imier, where he founded the factory. A monument to his memory was erected on 13 October 1907.
