= Charles L'Éplattenier =

Swiss painter and architect

Charles L'Éplattenier (9 October 1874 – 7 June 1946) was a Swiss painter and architect who created the Swiss version of Art Nouveau, called Style Sapin.

He was born in Neuchâtel. His students and collaborators included Léon Gallet, and the young Le Corbusier (Charles-Édouard Jeanneret). In his study of Corbusier, Kenneth Frampton writes that "one cannot emphasize too strongly the seminal role played in Jeanneret's early life" by L'Éplattenier. He worked almost exclusively in the town of La Chaux de Fonds, where from 1897 he taught at the school of decorative arts.

At the time, La Chaux-de-Fonds was developing into one of the leading centres of the Swiss watch industry. Increasing prosperity created a large demand for property and art in the style of the time among the wealthy citizens of the city. L'Éplattenier and his students developed a local form of Art Nouveau known as Style Sapin ("pine style"), after a frequently recurring motif in their work. Style Sapin is characterised by an intensive study of nature and the artistic stylization of indigenous structures.

L'Éplattenier's works include monuments to the Republic and the politician Numa Droz in La Chaux-de-Fonds, figures and decorative elements in the town's crematorium and at the cemetery, as well as repoussé and enamel watch-case designs for the Gallet Watch Company. Upon funding for construction at the bequeath of Léon Gallet, the Musée des beaux-arts de La Chaux-de-Fonds (Beaux Arts Museum of La-Chaux-de-Fonds) was built to L'Éplattenier's designs.

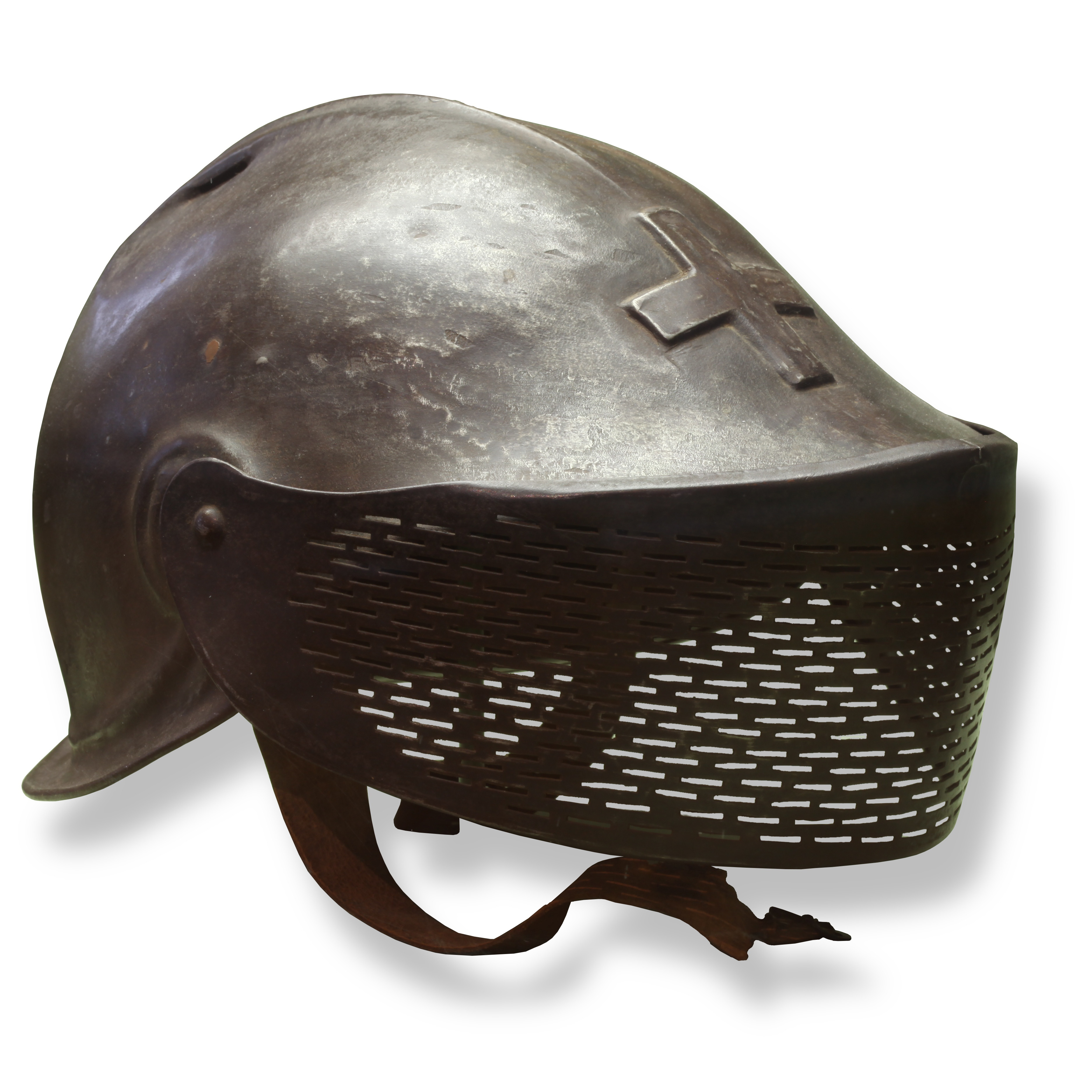
L'Éplattenier helmet, on display at Morges military museum

L'Eplattenier also designed a prototype military helmet, which was shunned in favour of the Imboden helmet. They are now prized collector's items.

L’Éplattenier designed the 'Helvetia Brustbild' postage stamp in 1906 for a new Swiss definitive series issued on November 11, 1907. The new 10, 12, and 15 cent definitive stamps featured a half-length portrait of Helvetia. His work was also part of the sculpture event in the art competition at the 1928 Summer Olympics.

A lover of the outdoors, L'Éplattenier fell to his death from a rocky promontory while hiking along the River Doubs, near Les Brenets, Switzerland.
