= Elizabeth Hardy (novelist) =

Irish novelist

- Born: 16 December 1794; Ireland
- Died: 9 May 1854; Queen's Bench Prison, London, England
- Citizenship: United Kingdom of Great Britain and Ireland
- Occupation: Novelist
- Writing career
- Language: English
- Genre: Fiction; Historical romance
- Subjects: Romance; Religion

Elizabeth Hardy (1794–1854) was an Irish novelist. All of her work was published anonymously. She died while imprisoned for debt in Queen's Bench Prison in London, England after having made a 'credulous' investment in a joint stock bank.

== Works ==
- Michael Cassidy, or the Cottage Gardener. (1845).
- Owen Glendower or The Prince of Wales: A Historical Romance. London: R. Bentley (1849).
- The Fiery Chief, Owen Glendower: A Historical Romance. London: R. Bentley (1851).
- The Confessor: a Jesuit Tale of the Times, Founded on Fact. London: Clarke, Beeton (1854).
