= Agassiz family =

Family of Swiss origin

The Agassiz family is a family of Swiss origin, from the small village of Agiez near Lake Neuchatel. The family has included a number of high-profile members, such as the scientists Louis and Alexander Agassiz, as well as the founder of the Longines watch firm, Auguste Agassiz.

== Family history ==
The early history of the family is sketched out in A Short History of the English Branch of the Agassiz Family, by A.R.N. Agassiz and in Jules Marcou's Life, Letters, And Works of Louis Agassiz.

The family was of the Protestant faith and many of their early members were ministers in the Church. The Rev. Jean Pierre Moise Agassiz (1705–1784) was Pastor of Lucens, Thierrens and Constantine, all of which were near Lake Neuchatel. His fourth son, the Rev. Philippe Louis Agassiz was the father of the Rev. Louis Benjamin Rudolph Agassiz, who was the father of the naturalist Louis Agassiz and Auguste Agassiz. Louis's son, Alexander, was a geologist like his father but his interests also turned to mining operations.

Auguste Agassiz moved to the Swiss town of Saint-Imier and set up his own watch firm in 1833 in partnership with Florian Morel and Henri Raiguel. In 1847 Agassiz became the firm's sole owner and in 1852 his nephew Ernest Francillon joined the firm. In 1866 Francillon acquired two plots of land called Les Longines ('long and narrow fields') and he built a factory there, allowing all the staff to be under one roof for the first time. In 1889 he registered the Longines brand and its famous winged hourglass symbol.

The Reverend Jean Pierre Moise Agassiz had another son, David Louis Agassiz (1737–1807). He left Switzerland with his friend Jacques Necker, moving to Paris to take a job in finance. Necker went on to become minister of finance to Louis XVI, while David Louis moved to England and anglicised his name to Lewis Agassiz. He became a City magnate, amassing a fortune that would be worth many millions today. He married Mary Griesdale.

His elder son Arthur David Lewis Agassiz (1771–1866) managed the family business and lost a great deal of his father's fortune. He married Jeanne Suzanne Prevost Rouviere (1776–1842). Among their many children, was Mary Ann (1799–1850), who married Joseph Frederick Edlmann (1794–1857), born in Hollenburg, Austria, and sent with the blessing of his uncle Reyer, of the Trieste trading company, Reyer und Schlitz, to open an office in London, after the fall of Napoleon. They lived in Peckham and are both buried in Nunhead Cemetery. Their son Frederick Joseph Edlmann (1829–1890), was a partner of the merchant bank Brown Shipley in the City of London, and bought the house Hawkwood, near Bromley, Kent. Another son, Joseph Ernest Edlmann (1831–1895) was a Major in the King's Dragoon Guards, based in Coventry, and lived in Kent House, Leamington Spa.

Arthur's daughter Aldine Agassiz married the clergyman Charles Benjamin Tayler.

David Louis's younger son was James John Charles Agassiz (1772–1858) was a Commander in the Royal Navy and was known for his gallantry in command of HMS Hound off the coast of Étaples, when he sent fire ships in amongst the French fleet. He was praised in despatches by Admiral Lord Nelson.

James John Charles Agassiz's elder son Lewis Agassiz (1793–1866) served in the Royal Marines and was leading one of the firing parties into Washington D.C. as part of the burning of Washington during the War of 1812. The Agassiz family was granted a coat of arms, depicting a torch for this action. He also fought in the Battle of Fort Peter. After he left the Royal Marines, Lewis Agassiz wrote A Journey to Switzerland, a travel book describing his family's travels in Europe back to his ancestral home. He continued to travel widely, becoming a friend of the King of Prussia who was godfather to one of his children and who bought another a commission in the British Army. Lewis Agassiz lived in the last years of his life at Stour Lodge, Bradfield, Essex.

His eldest surviving son, Lewis Nunn Agassiz, also had a military career, but went on to become a pioneer in Canada. He and his family founded the town of Agassiz, British Columbia. Lewis Nunn Agassiz's daughter, Margaret Eliza Florence Askin Agassiz, later wrote an account of pioneer life titled Memories of a Pioneer Life in British Columbia: A Short History of the Agassiz Family.

Lewis Agassiz's other children included the Rev. Rodolph Agassiz (d 1899), Rector of Radnage, who married Matilda Isabella Shafto, granddaughter of Sir Cuthbert Shafto of Bavington Hall, Northumberland, from whom the Canadian mountain biker Graham Agassiz descends, and Alfred Agassiz, who emigrated to New Zealand and has many descendants among the Te Whakatohea tribe of the Māori.

The Agassiz family is now scattered throughout the world, in Switzerland, the United Kingdom, Canada, United States, Australia and New Zealand. However, the name is extremely rare, with only a few dozen Agassiz families existing.
