= Longines =

Swiss watchmaker

Compagnie des Montres Longines, Francillon S.A.

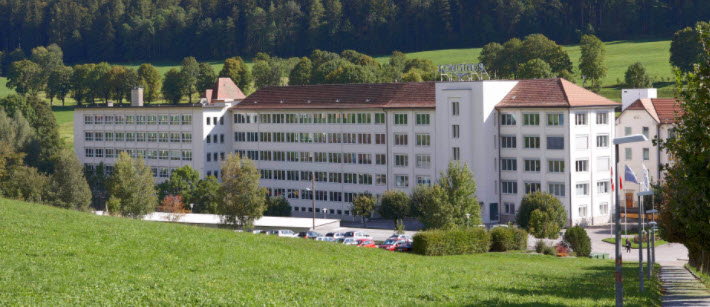
- Factory in Saint-Imier
- Type: Subsidiary
- Industry: Watchmaking
- Founded: 1832; 194 years ago
- Founders: Ernest Francillon & Auguste Agassiz
- Headquarters: Saint-Imier, Switzerland
- Area served: Worldwide
- Key people: Patrick Aoun (President & CEO)
- Products: Wristwatches; Stopwatches
- Revenue: CHF 1.11 Billion (2023)
- Number of employees: 1,300 (2024)
- Parent: The Swatch Group
- Website: Official website

Compagnie des Montres Longines, Francillon S.A., or simply Longines (French pronunciation: [lɔ̃ʒin]), is a Swiss luxury watchmaker based in Saint-Imier, Switzerland. Founded by Auguste Agassiz in 1832, the company has been a subsidiary of the Swiss Swatch Group and its predecessors since 1983. Its winged hourglass logo, registered in 1889, is the oldest unchanged active trademark registered with WIPO.

== History ==
=== 1832–1852 ===
Longines was founded in Saint-Imier in 1832 by Auguste Agassiz, a Swiss watchmaker and brother of biologist Louis Agassiz. Auguste had two partners, lawyers Henri Raiguel and Florian Morel; the company's original name was Raiguel Jeune & Cie. By 1846, Raigeul and Morel had retired from the watch industry, leaving Agassiz as sole company head.

Several years later, Agassiz brought in his nephew, trained economist Ernest Francillon, into the business. Francillon made several innovations that would distinguish the company from its competitors. One early innovation from Francillon was to solely produce crown-wound pocket watches rather than the prevalent key-wound alternative. Later, when Agassiz started suffering from ill health, he passed leadership to Francillon.

=== 1852–1878 ===
Under Francillon, the company began segueing out of the établissage system and moved towards more modern production methods. Francillon solidified his firm's progression to mass production in 1867 by establishing his first factory. Its location, an area in southern St. Imier known locally as Les Longines ("long meadows"), gave rise to the Longines name. To help further his efforts to improve the production at Longines, Francillon brought on Jacques David, a talented engineer. In addition, Francillon appointed David as Technical Director and put him in charge of the new factory. By 1867, it was also marked the year the Longines factory produced its first in-house watch movement, the 20A. The 20A, built with an anchor escapement (usually employed in pendulum clocks), was wound and set via a pendent crown. The innovative movement won an award at the 1867 Universal Exhibition in Paris.

Several years later, the U.S. watchmaking industry was making strides in industrialized watch manufacturing. Francillon sent Jacques David to the 1876 World's Fair in Philadelphia to gather new ideas and strategies from American watchmakers. Upon returning, David wrote a 108-page report detailing what he learned during his trip; the report is considered one of the most significant documents in watchmaking history, detailing the inner workings of American watch factories, including the entire production process, from raw materials to finished watches, and the highly-effective internal structure and quality control measures implemented in American factories. In his analysis, David concluded the Swiss watchmaking industry needed to change significantly to keep pace with its American competitors.

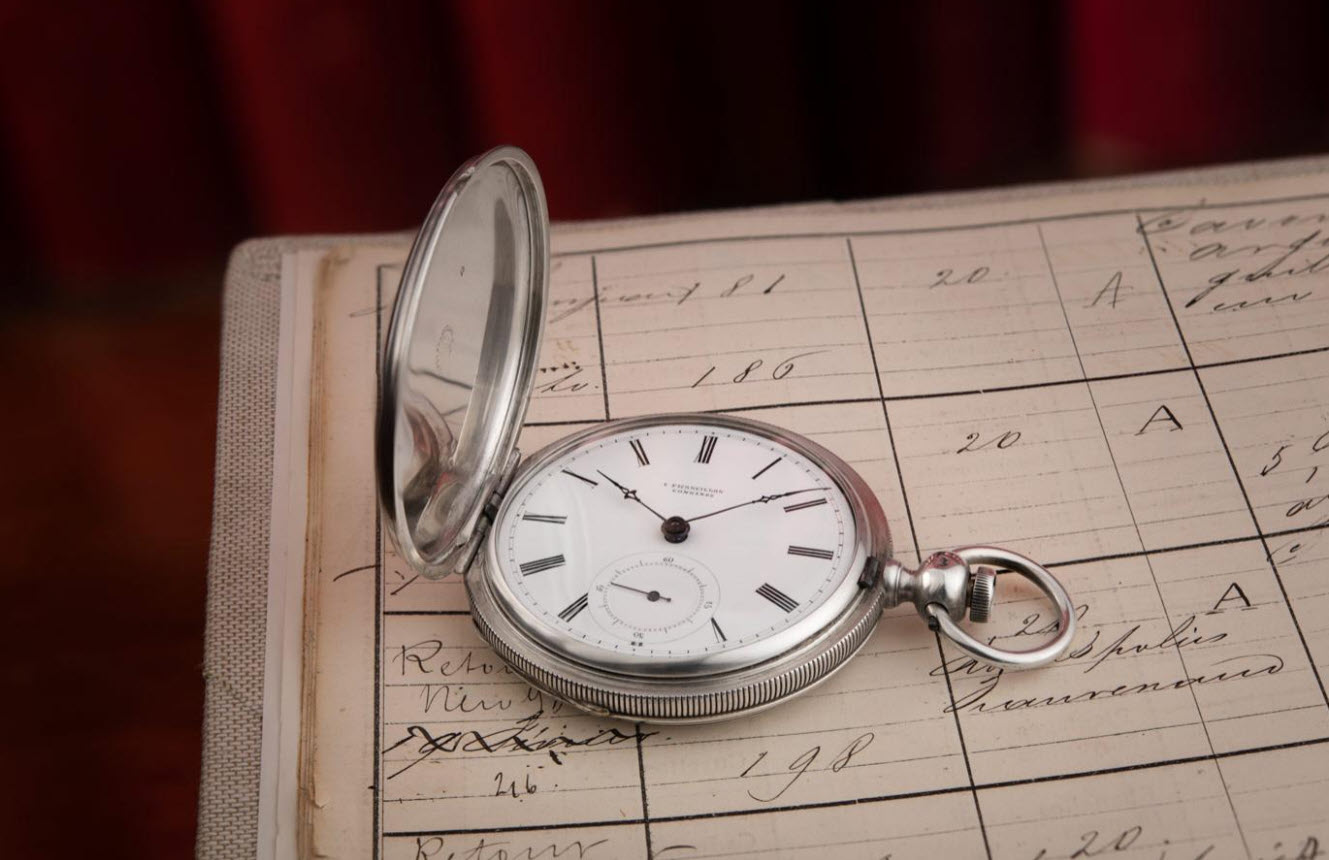
Longines Serial Number 183 "Attesa" date 1867. On 6 November 2018, Longines announced discovery of serial number 183, dated 23 October 1867, currently the Oldest Longines watch known. Its caliber is an August Agassiz 4 (AA4).

Longines was the world's first watch trademark and the first Swiss company to assemble watches under one roof.

=== 1878–1925 ===
In 1878, Longines developed its first chronograph movement, the 20H, a "mono-pusher" chronograph, in which all 3 chronograph functions (start, stop, and reset) were controlled via the crown. With the 20H, Longines could produce stopwatches suitable for precise timing in professional events. This was when Longines began building its reputation in equestrian sports, such as horse racing and jumping.

By 1880, Longines was known for the quality and precision of its timepieces. To Francillon's dismay, the brand became a target for counterfeiters. Longines counterfeits were not only directly stealing business and revenue from Francillon, but also potentially damaging his company's reputation. Francillon trademarked the Longines name in 1880 and its winged hourglass logo in 1889. By 1886, Longines had established itself as a primary supplier of timing equipment for most New York sporting officials.

Notable Longines calibers:

- Longines 20H pocket chronograph
- Longines 18.72 pocket chronograph
- Longines 19.73 pocket chronograph

=== 1925–1971 ===
In 1925, Longines manufactured the Zulu Time, that is the first wristwatch to display a dual time zones for the Royal Canadian Navy. In 1927, P.V.H. Weems collaborated with Longines to produce the first wrist watch, the Weems Avigation watch. The watch was 48 mm in diameter.

In 1931, Longines collaborated with Charles Lindbergh to introduce the Hour Angle aviation watch.

In 1934, Longines released the first Chronograph with Flyback function. Technology that will be patented in 1936.

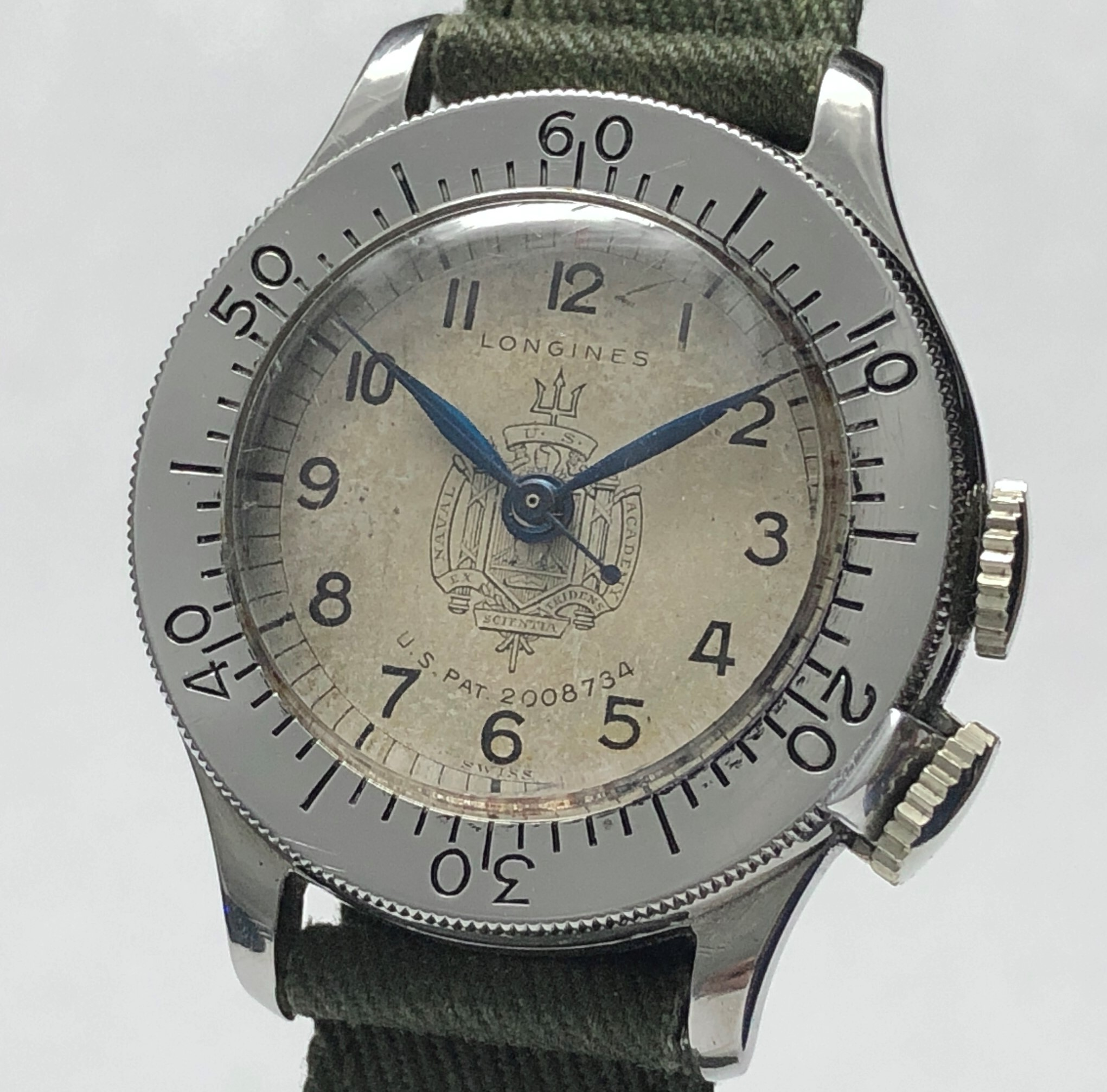
Longines Weems ref 3931 c.1937 US Naval Academy Annapolis Dial

In 1937, P.V.H. Weems again collaborated with Longines to produce a second, smaller (33mm) Weems avigation watch (reference 3930, 3931, and 4036).

In 1969, Longines developed its first quartz movement.

In 1954, Longines introduced a timekeeping instrument called Longines Chronocinegines.

Notable Longines calibers:

- Longines 12.68z time only or wrist watch chronograph
- Longines 13.33z wrist watch chronograph
- Longines 13ZN wrist watch chronograph
- Longines 30CH wrist watch chronograph
- Longines 37.9 time only
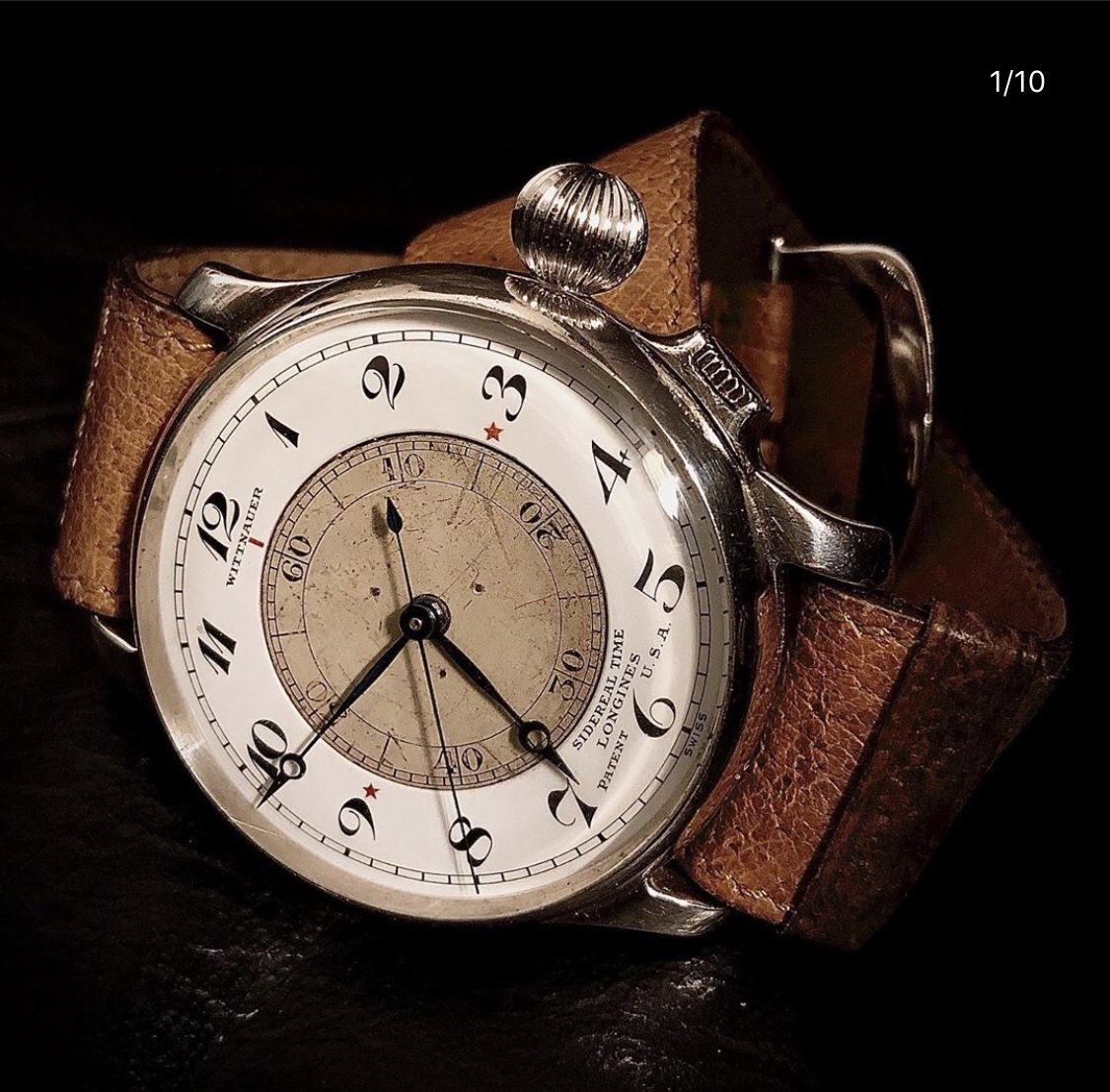
  Longines Seconds Setting Watch. Sidereal Time ref 4356

=== 1971–present ===
In 1983, Longines' owner ASUAG merged with SSIH (which owned Omega SA) to form the Société Suisse de Microélectronique et d'Horlogerie (SMH). SMH became The Swatch Group in 1988, and Longines continued without R&D and production activities of its own. In the 1990s, Swatch differentiated and repositioned its various brands in order to better compete in all market segments, with Omega becoming the high-end brand intended to compete with Rolex and Cartier, while Longines was positioned in a less-expensive segment, its watches redesigned as objects of elegance and classicism, emphasizing the historical tradition of manufacture, as opposed to the craft of watchmaking. In 2019, Longines licensed its name and branding to Marcolin for a collection of men's and women's optical frames and sunglasses.

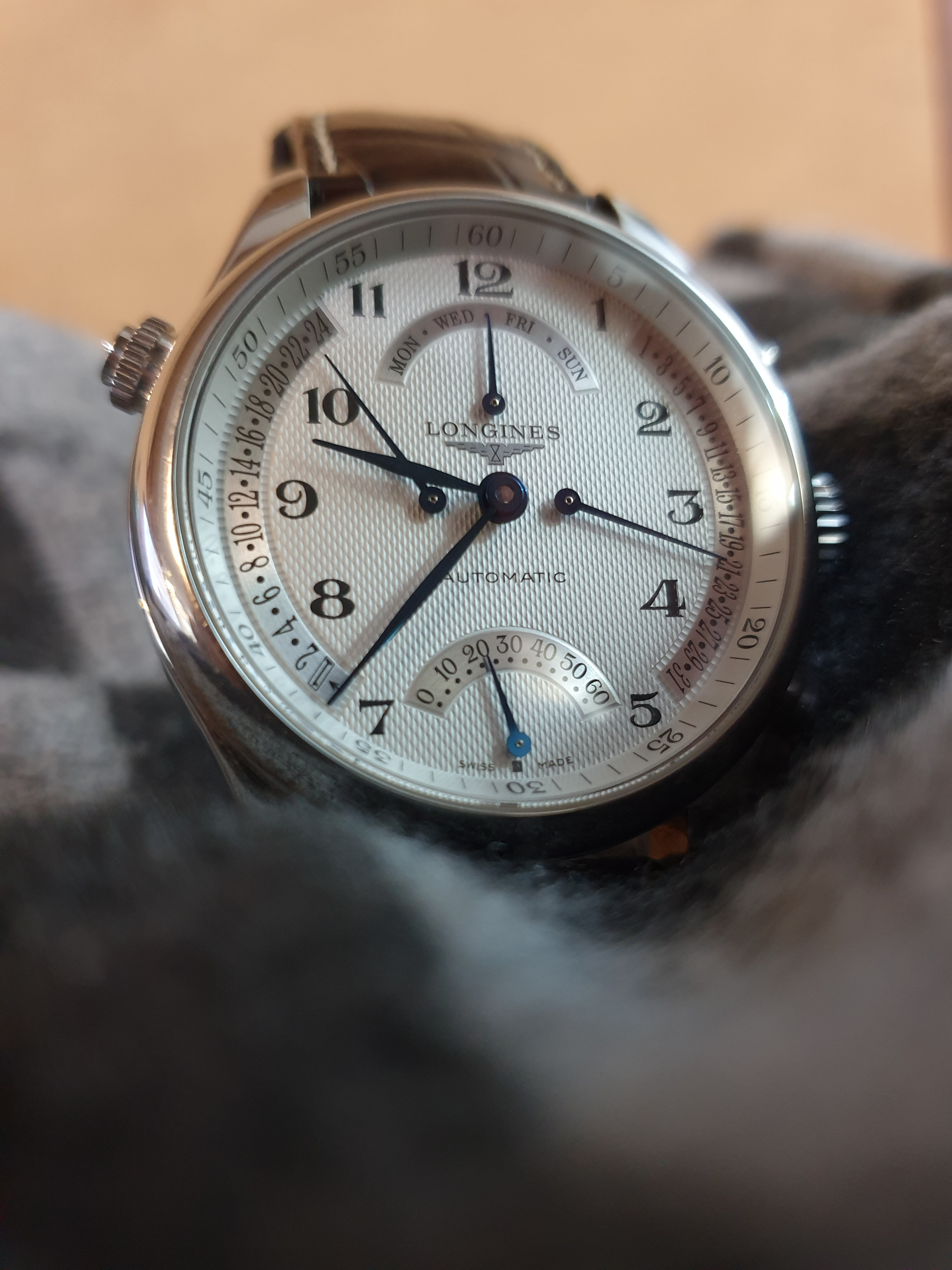
Longines Master Retrograde Small Seconds

== Intellectual property and marketing ==
Longines began using the slogan "Elegance is an Attitude" in 1999. Their previous slogan, "The World's Most Honoured Watch" was used for most of the 20th century.

The Longines Logo is the oldest registered trade mark still in use in its original form registered with the World Intellectual Property Organization.

=== Sponsorships ===
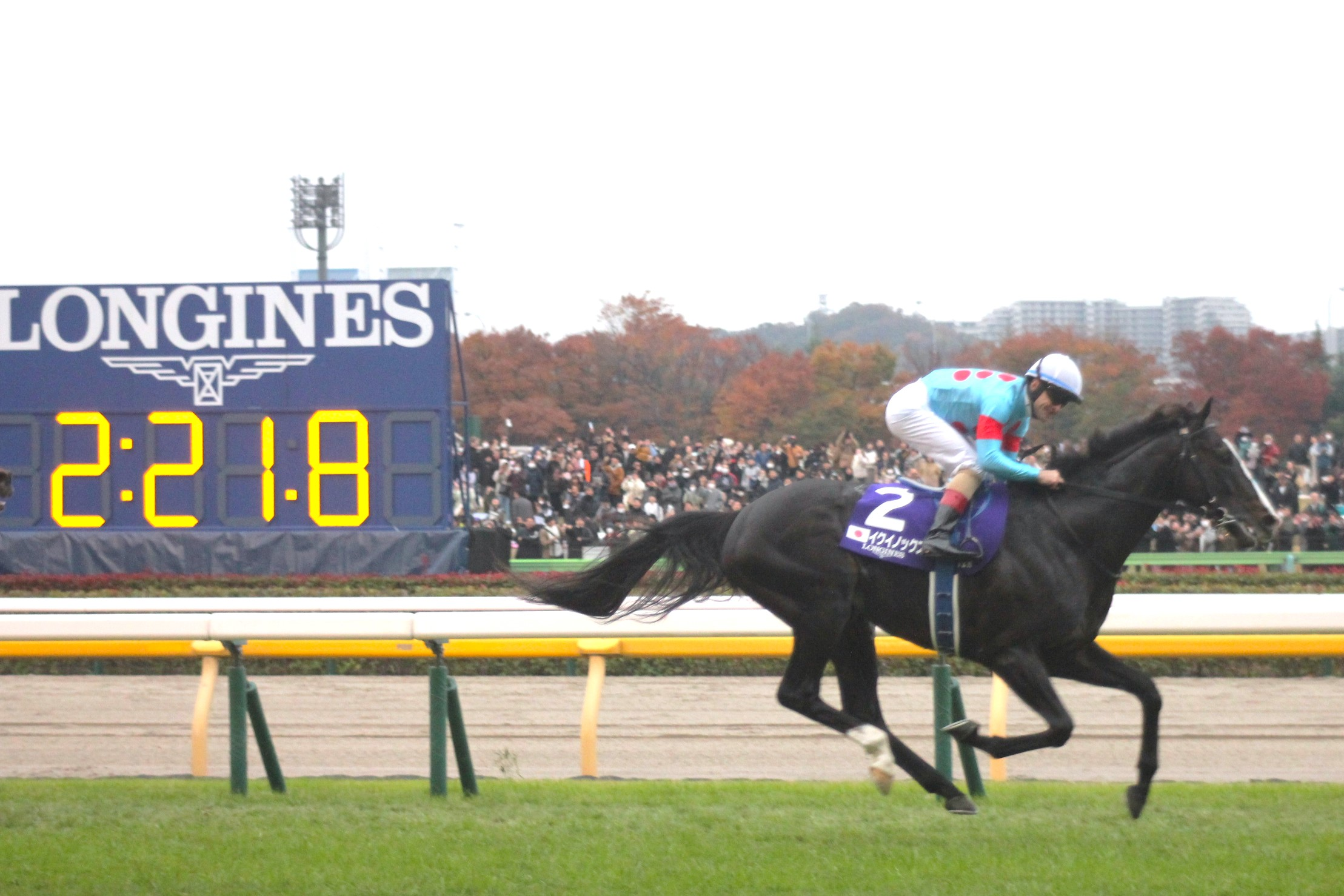
Longines logo at the 2023 Japan Cup

Since Longines developed its first chronograph movement in 1878, the brand has steadily built strong relationships with various sporting organizations, events and teams worldwide. First came horse racing, then additional equestrian sports such as show jumping, endurance riding and eventing (a "triathlon" of dressage, cross-country, jumping).

Today, Longines is designated as official timekeeper, partner, and watch for competitions worldwide including:

- Formula One World Championship (1980s)
- Archery World Cup
- Commonwealth Games
- French Open
- World Artistic Gymnastics Championships
- FEI Show Jumping World Cup
- FIS Alpine Ski World Cup
- Hong Kong International Races
- Kentucky Derby
- Japan Cup
- Longines Global Champions Tour

== Notable patrons and owners ==
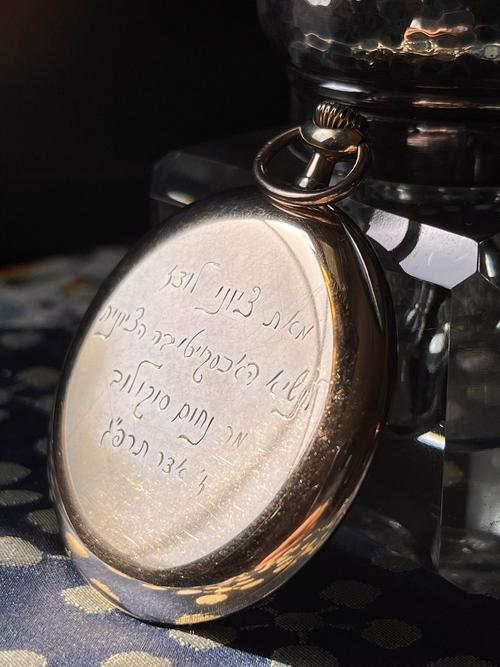
A Longines pocket watch, enscripted: "From the Lodz Zionists To The President Of the Zionists Executive Board, Mr. Nahum Sokolow"

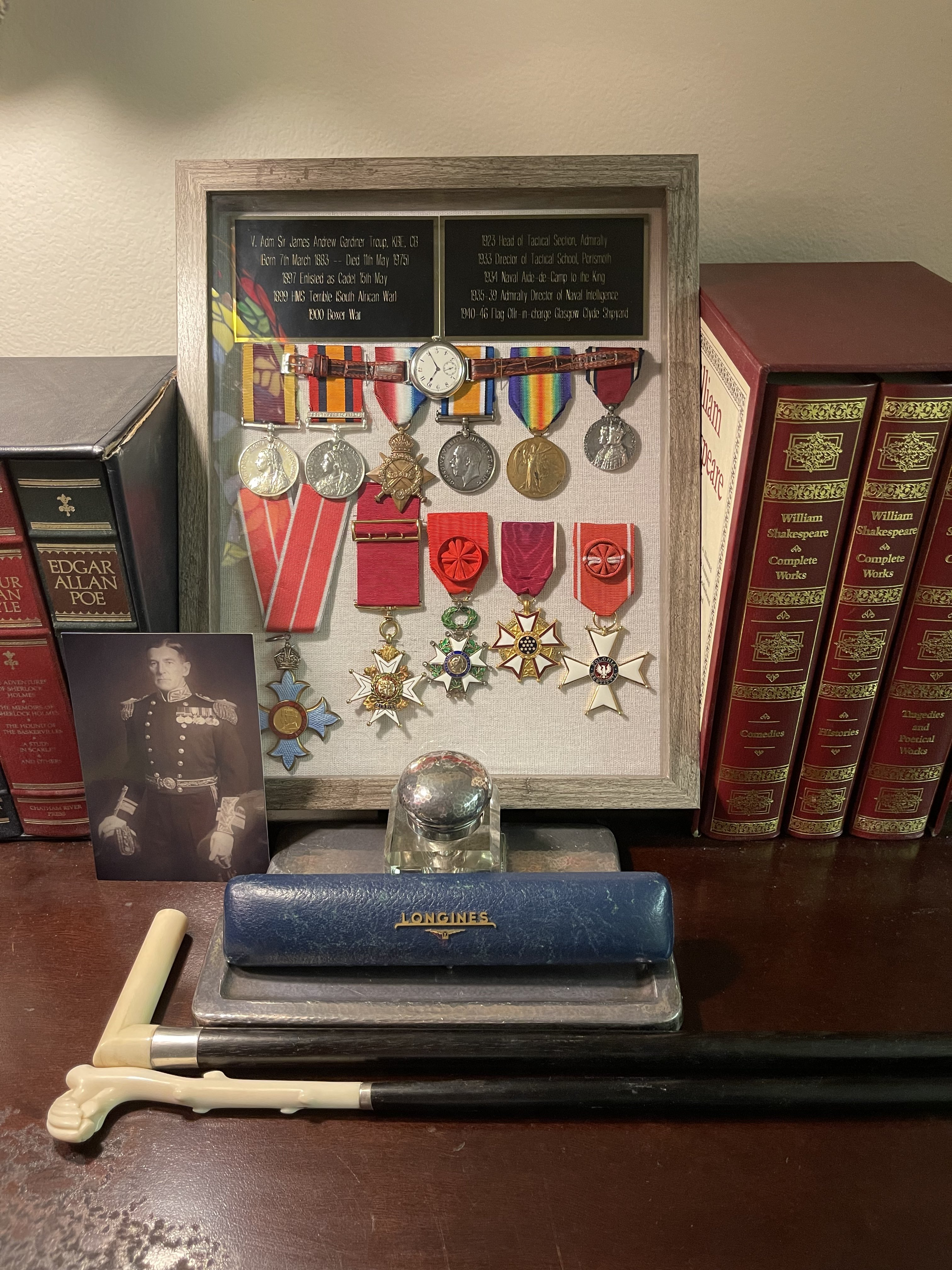
A Longines watch among the medals of Sir James Troup.

Notable Longines brand ambassadors and timepieces owners include Henry Cavill, Humphrey Bogart, Harry Connick Jr., Audrey Hepburn, David Lynch, Dr Nahum Sokolow, Aaron Kwok, Lin Chi-ling, Eddie Peng, Steffi Graf, Andre Agassi, Aishwarya Rai, Kate Winslet, Mikaela Shiffrin, Simon Baker, Jung Woo-sung, Bae Suzy, Barbara Palvin, Yana Kudryavtseva, Evgenia Kanaeva and Jennifer Lawrence.

Notable Longines historical figures include

- Albert Einstein owned two timepieces from Longines, one 1943 silver pocket watch and one 1929 gold wristwatch. (Note: In addition to the two timepieces from Longines, Albert Einstein also had a Patek Philippe pocket watch, which he ordered in 1915 (the year he completed his theory of General Relativity) and is now kept in the Patek Philippe Museum in Geneva, and a possibly German-made, unknown-brand pocket watch (circa 1900), which was auctioned by Christie's for GBP 266,500 in London on 13 July 2016.) His Longines' wristwatch, which was presented to him by Rabbi Edgar Magnin in 1931, was auctioned by Antiquorum for US$596,000 in New York on 16 October 2008, making it the most expensive Longines' timepiece ever sold at auction. His Longines pocket watch is now kept in the Bern Historical Museum in Switzerland.
- United States Navy Captain Philip Van Horn Weems also known as P. V. H. Weems
- United States Army Air Corps Reserve Charles Lindbergh
- United States Navy Admiral Richard E. Byrd
- United Kingdom Royal Navy Vice-Admiral Sir James Troup
- Amelia Earhart
- Howard Hughes
- Amy Johnson
- Ruth Nichols
- Elinor Smith
- Wiley Post
- Walter Mitterholzer
- Paul-Emile Victor
- Bailey Girling
- Auguste and Jacques Piccard
- Thor Heyerdahl

== See also ==
- The Longines Symphonette
- List of watch manufacturers
