= Mühle Glashütte =

German watchmaker

Nautische Instrumente Mühle Glashütte
- Industry: Manufacturing
- Founded: Glashütte (Sachsen)
- Founder: Hans-Jürgen Mühle
- Headquarters: Glashütte, Germany
- Area served: Worldwide
- Products: Watches and Nautical Instruments
- Website: www.muehle-glashuette.de

Mühle-Glashütte GmbH nautische Instrumente und Feinmechanik (“nautical instruments and precision engineering”) is a German maker of nautical instruments, marine timepieces and wristwatches based in Glashütte, Saxony. The family business was founded in 1869. The brand was re-started in 1994 after the Iron Curtain fell.

== History ==
The Mühle family has more than 140-year history of instrument-making craft in and around the area of Glashütte. The roots of the family business date back five generations - from the year 1869, when Robert Mühle founded his own company in Glashütte, manufacturing precision measuring instruments for the local watch industry and watchmaker school. Mühle-Glashütte S.A. was founded in 1994 by Hans-Jürgen Mühle, father of the current CEO Thilo Mühle whose children have joined company as well.

=== 1869-1921: Robert Mühle ===
Robert Mühle was born in 1841, in Lauenstein and completed a training as toolmaker at the watch manufacturer Moritz Grossmann. In 1869 he founded his own company in Glashütte. He manufactured precision measuring instruments for the Glashütte watch company and the watchmaking school with such storied companies as A Lange & Sohne using his tools.

The measuring instruments produced by Robert Mühle were of great importance for the Glashütte area watchmaking industry, which needed precise measuring instruments for the production of their clockworks. Besides this, they developed leading-edge technology, because the Glashütte factories used the new metric system of measurement, not the standard for the Swiss watchmaking typical Paris line used. With its precise measuring instruments in the tradition of Robert Mühle, the Mühle, the family feels obligated to the present: the precise measurement. The lineage of the company was cemented early on when Robert Mühle was awarded the Gold Medal of the City of Dresden in 1896 for his precise measuring instruments.

=== 1921-1945: Rob. Mühle & Son ===
Under the leadership of Paul, Max and Alfred Mühle, the sons of Robert Mühle, the company could expand its product range. And so from about 1925 onward, speedometers, rev counters and car clocks were made. These not only are used in cars of the brands Maybach and DKW, also BMW motorcycles were equipped with Mühle-tachometers.

The WWII caused a deep cuts in the corporate's manufacturing industry. Shortly before the end of war the Soviet Air Force bombed and destroyed large parts of Glashütte and the Mühle company.

=== 1945-1970: Hans Mühle ===
While the names of most Glashütte area watch factories have disappeared, the name "Mühle" still was connected to the center of the German precision watchmaking and a precise measurement industry. Hans Mühle founded a new company in December 1945 which manufactured dial trains for pressure and temperature measuring instruments.

=== 1970-2007: Hans-Jürgen Mühle ===
After the death of his father, Hans-Jürgen Mühle (b. 1941), took over his father's business. In 1972 the Mühle family suffered dispossession for a second time. The company was initially transformed in a national enterprise and in 1980 converted into the Glashütte Watchmaking Plants (VEB Glashütter Uhrenbetriebe).

Hans-Jürgen Mühle was still in active operation, and later became sales manager of the Glashütte Watchmaking Plants. The German unification enabled him to revive the company of his ancestors, so in 1994, he founded "Mühle-Glashütte GmbH nautische Instrumente und Feinmechanik" (nautical instruments and precision engineering).

At the beginning Mühle produced professional marine chronometers, ship's timepieces and other nautical instruments such as Barometer or hygrometer. Two years later the production was extended to mechanical wristwatches, which quickly became the main business of the company. Mühle used in house refined Swiss movements for production of its watches. In 2005 it came into a legal dispute with a different manufacturer (Nomos Glashütte) about whether the movements go along with the so-called "Glashütte rule" (i.e., 50% of the adding value of the movement has to be realized in Glashütte). The dispute escalated and Mühle was forced to reoriganize in 2007.

=== 2007-2011: Thilo Mühle ===
Thilo Mühle (b. 1968) joined the family business in 2000. In October 2007, he took over the management of the company to pull it back from bankruptcy.

Under the leadership of Thilo Mühle, the watchmaker expanded its vertical integration. This included the development of the woodpecker regulation in 2003 (later patented), the Glashütte three-quarter plate and the Mühle rotor. The company introduced two movements with their own caliber name: the chronograph movement MU 9408 and then in March 2011 introduced manual winding movement MU 9411. In 2010 the company expanded their business by entering into the USA market with Duber Time as its exclusive distributor. In 2012, the S.A.R Flieger-Chronograph received the best 'Active Lifestyle Watch' award from an international jury of watch experts. Several models, including the Teutonia II series and related sports models, have also received design awards at international competitions in 2017 and 2021.

== Watch models ==
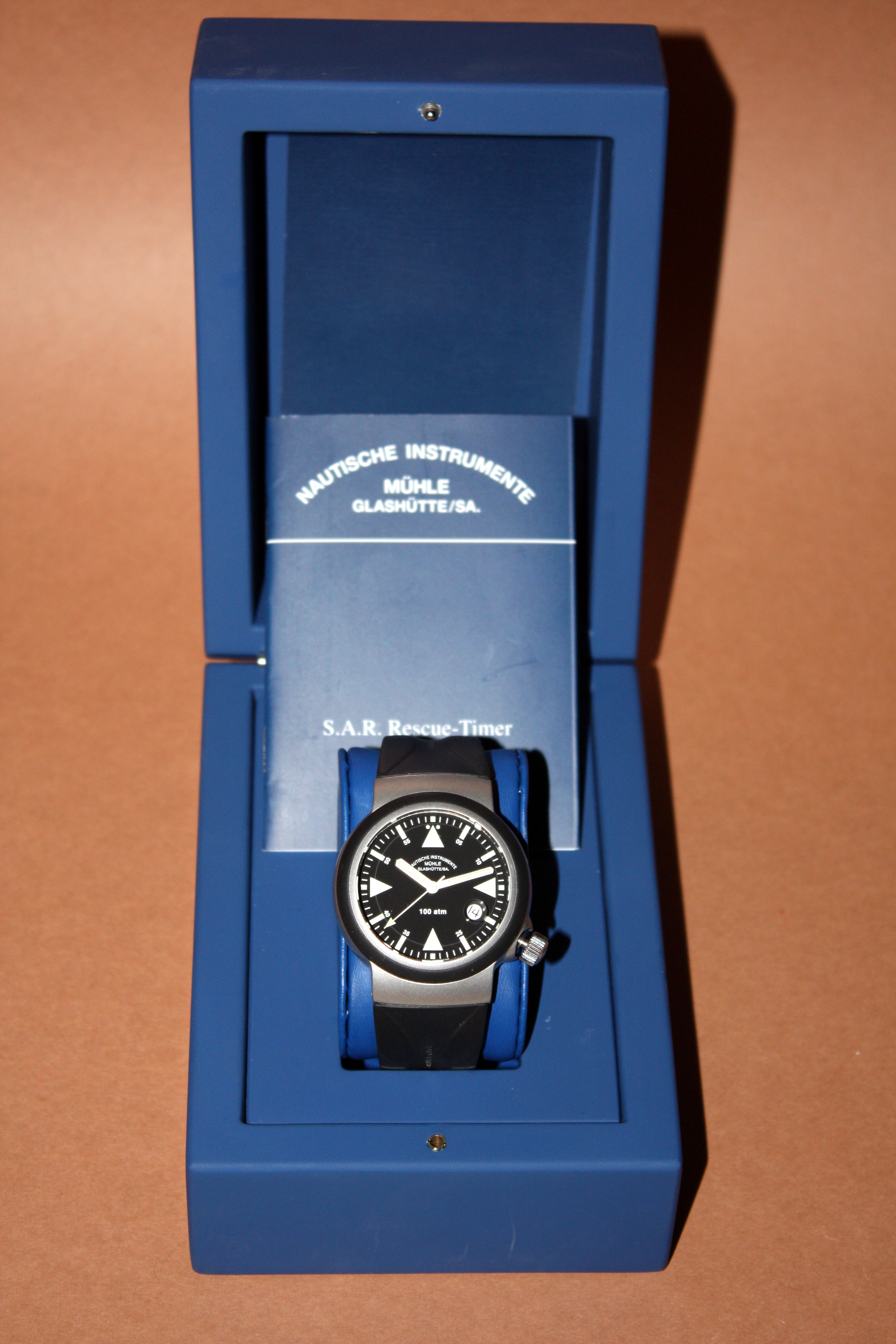
SAR Rescue-Timer

Mühle-Glashütte, in contrast to vendors such as Glashütte Original or A. Lange & Söhne produces entry-level luxury watches, focusing on the entry-level luxury market segment with high-quality steel watches with sober and restrained no-nonsense Bauhaus design. Most models are available with stainless steel bracelets or leather bands, for divers watches rubber bands are available.

In 2022 they produced a limited edition of only 20 18k gold S.A.R Rescue Timers to celebrate the 20 years of the model which has been proven to be one of their most enduring creations, as it is currently sold out in all quantities. In 2018, they produced a limited edition in conjunction with AOPA.

The timepieces of Mühle-Glashütte are divided into four product lines. Currently models are available in the following lines:

- Nautical Wristwatches: Marinus, Marinus GMT, Rasmus 2000, Seebataillon GMT, S.A.R. Flieger-Chronograph (Pilot's Chronograph), S.A.R. Rescue-Timer - the watch of the captains of the rescue cruiser of the German Maritime Search and Rescue Service.
- Classic Timepiece: Teutonia III Handaufzug (with the new movement MU 9411), Teutonia II Chronograph, Teutonia II Kleine Sekunde, Teutonia II Chronometer, Teutonia II Quadrant Chronograph, Teutonia II Quadrant Medium, Teutonia II Medium, Antaria Chronograph, Antaria Kleine Sekunde, Antaria Datum, Antaria Medium
- Sporty Instrument Watches: Terranaut Trail I to III, Terrasport I to III, 29er Chronograph, Big 29er, 29er, City 99, Lady 99, M 29 Classic, Sportiva
- Limited Special Editions: S.A.R. Anniversary-Timer, Marinus Chronograph, AOPA.

== See also ==
- List of German watch manufacturers
