= Moritz Grossmann =

German luxury watch manufacturer

Grossmann Uhren GmbH
- Industry: Watches
- Founded: 2008
- Founders: Christine Hutter
- Headquarters: Glashütte, Saxony, Germany
- Products: Watches and timepieces
- Number of employees: 46
- Website: www.grossmann-uhren.com

Moritz Grossmann is a manufacturer of luxury wristwatches based in Glashütte, Germany. Annual production is approximately 200 pieces.

== History ==
During the 2008 financial crisis, Christine Hutter (who had previously held positions at Wempe, Maurice Lacroix, Glashütte Original, and A. Lange & Söhne) founded her own luxury watch brand, Moritz Grossmann, after acquiring the right to use the name of 19th century founder and director of the German School of Watchmaking, Karl Moritz Grossmann. Initially the company operated from her personal residence in Dresden, but shortly afterwards moved into a former hardware store in Glashütte. In 2010, having grown to 16 employees, the company released its first production model and acquired land to build a new factory. By 2013 the construction was complete.

== Models ==
The Benu Tourbillon, designed by Jens Schneider, was the world's first watch to use a human hair as an integral part of its movement. Other models as of 2015 are the Benu, Benu Power Reserve, Atum, Tefnut and Tefnut Lady. All models take their names from Ancient Egyptian deities.

== See also ==
- List of German watch manufacturers
