= David Lee (businessman) =

American businessman

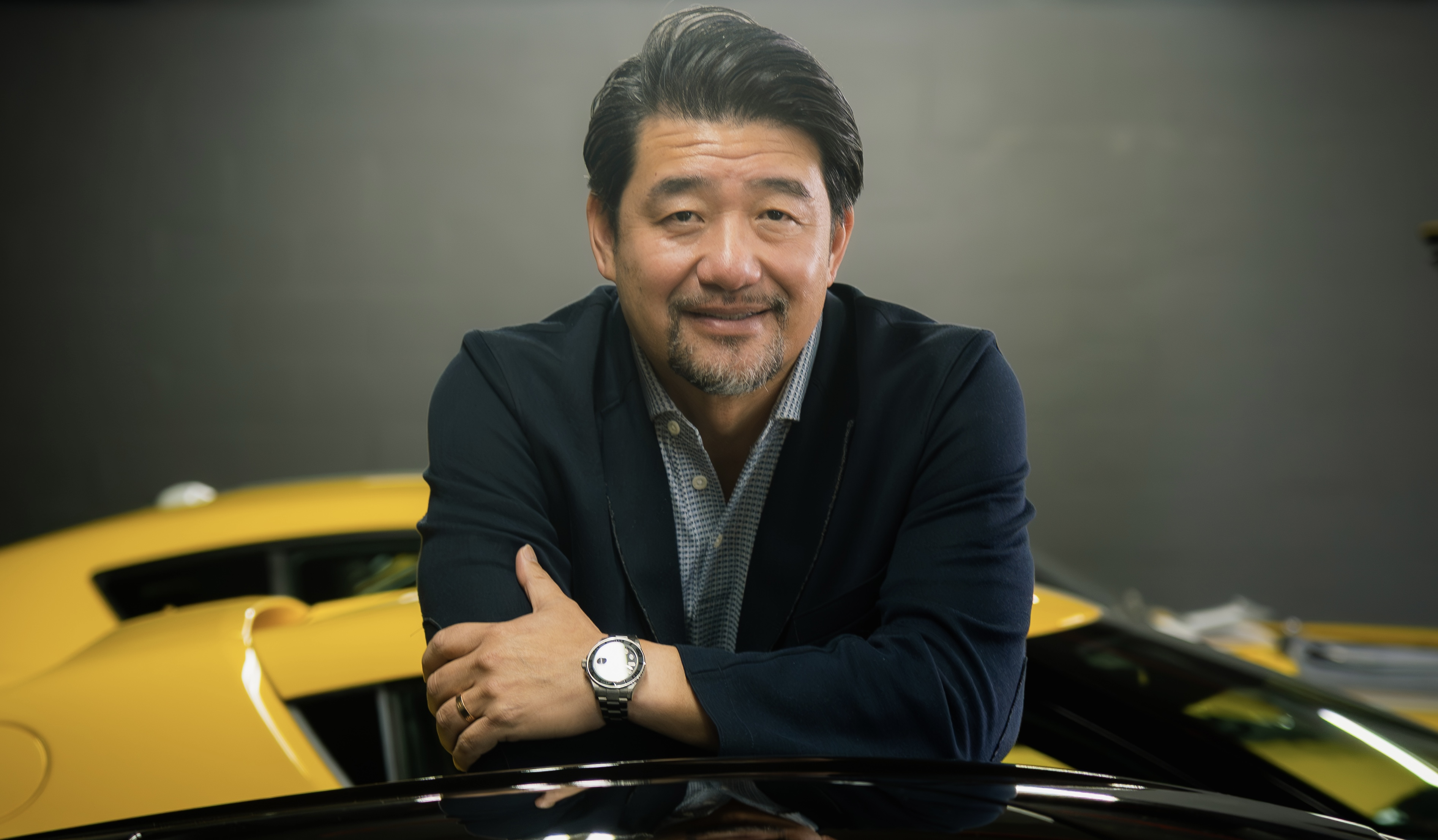
- Occupations: businessman, investor, automobile collector, and philanthropist

David SK Lee is an Asian American businessman, investor, automobile collector, and philanthropist. He serves as Chairman and CEO of the Hing Wa Lee Group, which includes Hing Wa Lee Jewelers, HWL Development & Real Estate Holdings, and Collectible Exotic Motors.

== Early life and education ==
Lee was born in Hong Kong. His father, Hing Wa Lee, founded a gemstone carving and jewelry business in 1965 that later became Hing Wa Lee Jewelers. In the early 1970s, his father assisted the Smithsonian Institution in the restoration of Chinese antique carvings. He subsequently obtained permanent residency in the United States and immigrated with his family.

The family initially settled in Bethesda, Maryland, where Hing Wa Lee established a wholesale business importing gemstone carvings and distributing them to retailers and galleries in the United States. In 1980, the business relocated to Los Angeles, California, where it imported and sold jade and other gemstone jewelry to retail jewelers across the US.

Lee attended the University of Southern California and graduated in 1992 from the USC Marshall School of Business.

== Career ==
After completing his undergraduate studies in 1992, Lee entered the family business. During the 1990s, Hing Wa Lee Gallery transitioned from a wholesale jewelry operation into a retail-focused enterprise. Hing Wa Lee Jewelers later developed into an authorized dealer for several international watchmakers and luxury jewelry houses including Rolex, Cartier, Breitling, Blancpain, Breguet, Bvlgari, Chopard, Girard-Perregaux, Glashutte Original, Hublot and Piaget. Lee later opened the Larchmont Jewelers, a jewelry store located in Larchmont Village. The property housing Larchmont Jewelers, originally constructed in 1923, received the Windsor Square Hancock Park Historical Society's 2024 Landmark Award in recognition of its restoration and adaptive reuse.

He has served on advisory bodies connected to the University of Southern California's Marshall School of Business and has participated in guest lectures and mentorship initiatives. In 2006, Lee founded the CEO Club, a private peer advisory group for Chinese-speaking chief executives.

=== Automotive collecting ===
Beginning in the 2000s, Lee became active in the collector automobile community, with a particular focus on Ferrari models. His collection includes Ferrari vehicles produced between 1962 and 2026. The collection includes the five Ferrari flagship supercars, 288 GTO, F40, F50, Ferrari Enzo, and LaFerrari, in both red and yellow specifications, and a restored 1972 Ferrari Dino. In 2026, Lee acquired a 1962 Ferrari 250 GTO for $38.5 million. It was built for British racing team owner John Coombs.

His collections also include Ducati motorcycles, timepieces, and signed guitars. He has participated in vintage and classic car racing events. A Ferrari 330 GTS from Lee's collection won Best in Show at the San Marino Motor Classic concours.

=== Film and entertainment activities ===
In the 2020s, Lee became involved in short film production as an executive producer and actor. He was associated with the short film Night Shift, which received awards and nominations at the Los Angeles Film Awards, the Accolade Global Film Competition, the New York International Film Awards, the Indie X Film Festival, the Golden State Film Festival (2025), the Hollywood International Golden Age Festival, and the International Auto Film Festa in Tokyo (2025). Screenings included presentations at the TCL Chinese Theatre during the Beverly Hills Film Festival.

== Philanthropy ==
In September 2024, Lee and his wife, Katherine Lee, contributed a $1 million lead gift to support homelessness initiatives by establishing the David and Katherine Lee Home, the fifth shelter funded by Door of Hope.

Lee is a member of the Widney Society at the University of Southern California (USC), contributing to scholarship and academic programs related to entrepreneurship. He has also served on the USC Marshall School of Business Board of Leaders.

== Personal life ==
Lee resides in California with his wife, Katherine Lee, and two children, Rachel and Ryan.
