= Herbert Collum =

German organist, harpsichordist and composer (1914–1982)

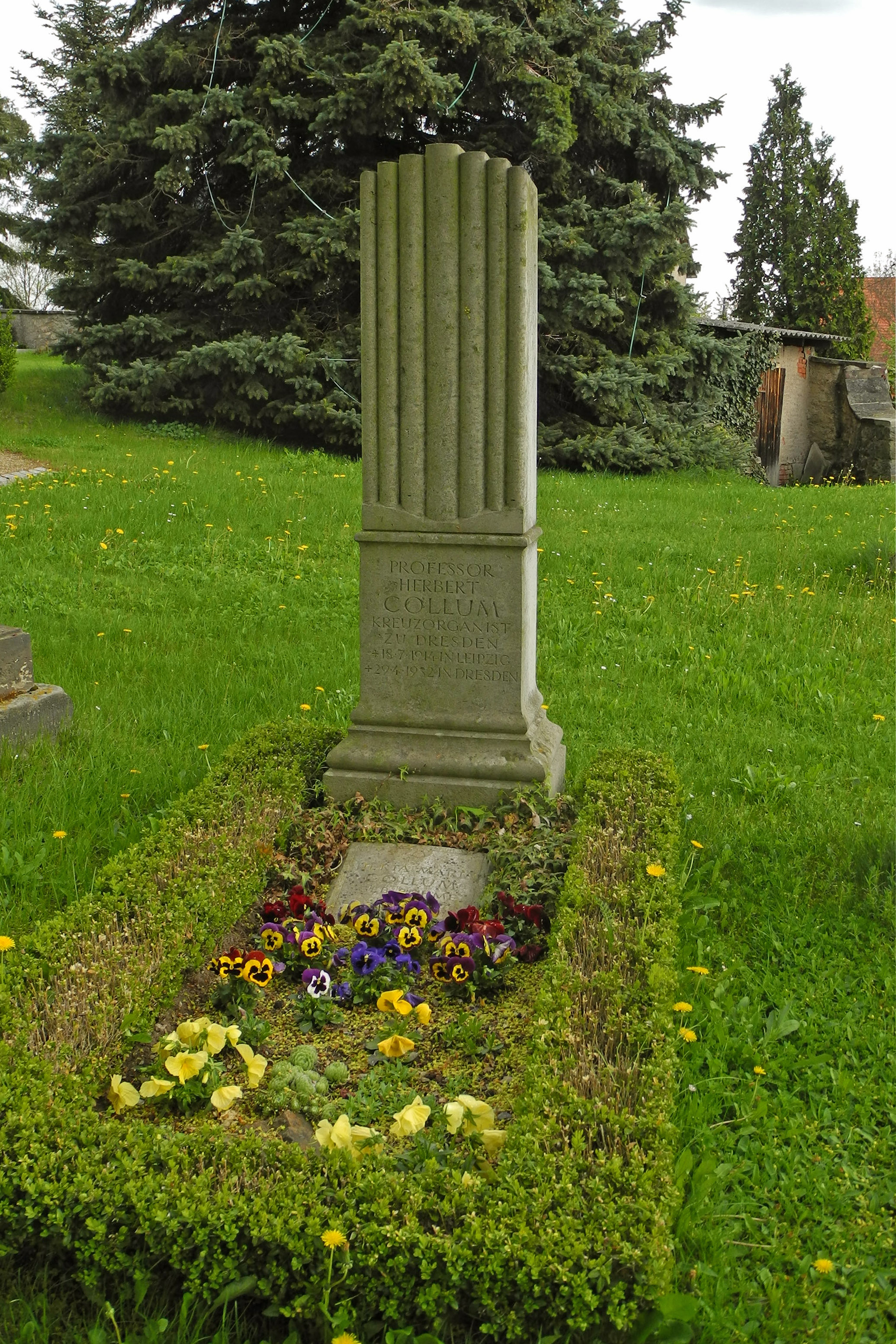
Gravestone of Herbert Collum in the village church of Reinhardtsgrimma

Herbert Collum (18 July 1914 − 29 April 1982) was a German organist, harpsichordist, composer and conductor.

== Life ==
Herbert Collum was born in Leipzig, Germany on 18 July 1914. He received high school education between 1921 and 1929. He continued from 1930 to 1934 at the Church Music Institute in Leipzig, where he studied organ with Karl Straube and Günther Ramin, piano with Carl Adolf Martienssen, choral conducting with Kurt Thomas, and musical composition with Johann Nepomuk David and Fritz Reuter. Already by 1927 he had become deputy organist at the St. Matthäikirche Leipzig. From 1932 to 1935 he served as assistant to Ramin, Thomaskantor at the Thomaskirche. His appointment in 1935 as principal organist at the Kreuzkirche, Dresden, signalled the beginning of his creative period; he remained in that post until his death in April 1982 at the age of 67. His successor as organist was Michael-Christfried Winkler.

At the end of World War II, Collum founded his own choir in 1946, with a dedicated set of concerts. To mark the 200th anniversary of J S Bach's death, he organised 24 concerts between September 1949 and August 1950, featuring the Collum Choir and members of the Staatskapelle Dresden. The performances took place at the Martin Luther Church in the Neustadt and the Reformed Church, because the Kreuzkirche had been damaged by fire after bombing in 1945.

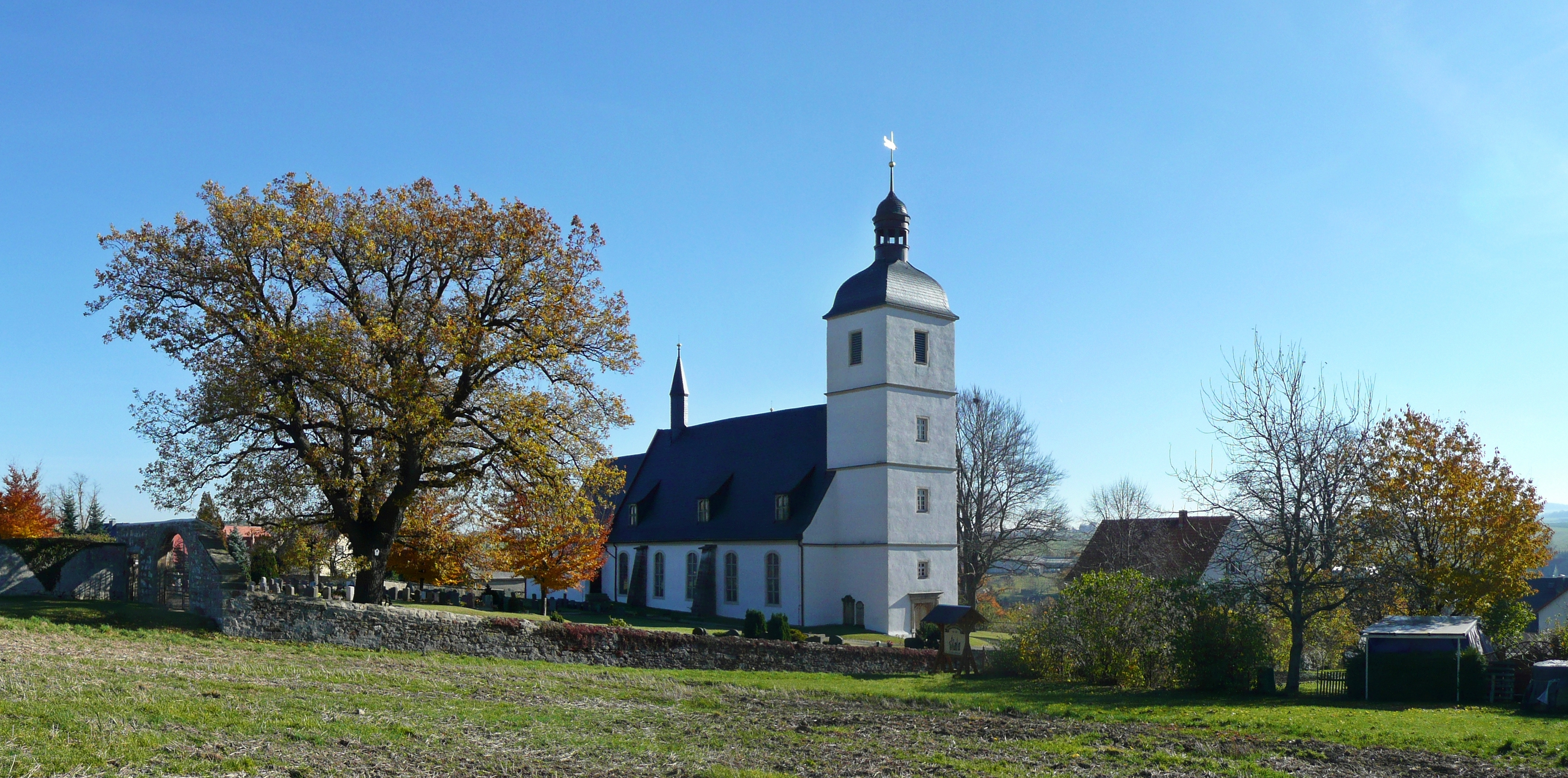
The village church of Reinhardtsgrimma in Saxony, where Collum regularly performed on the Silbermann organ and was later buried

Collum, 1965
Great Fantasia and Fugue in G minor, BWV 542, on the Silbermann organ, Reinhardtsgrimma

As organist at the Kreuzkirche, Collum also took on various teaching roles. From 1942 to 1945 and again between 1954 and 1956, he was a lecturer at the Dresden Conservatory, teaching organ there from 1956 to 1958. He also taught organ at the Spandauer Kirchenmusikschule from 1949 to 1961, with a professorship in 1960. He began reaching harpsichord at the Musikhochschule Dresden in 1964, the same year as his appointment to the jury of the International Johann Sebastian Bach Competition.

In 1942 he married the singer and teacher Herta Maria Böhme-Collum. After one year Christian Collum was born: following in the footsteps of his parents, he became an organist and church musician.

Collum died in Dresden on 29 April 1982 at the age of 67. He was buried according to his last wishes in Reinhardtsgrimma. He frequently gave concerts on the Silbermann organ in the village church and made a recording in the series Bach on Silbermann Organs. The concert tradition founded by him has been continued under the direction of the current Kreuzkirche organist, Holger Gehring, resulting in the organ becoming one of the best known in Saxony.

== Honours and legacy ==
In 1973 Collum received the Art Prize of the German Democratic Republic. In Dresden, the Herbert-Collum-Straße was later named after him. The archives of Herbert Collum are kept in the Saxon State and University Library Dresden.

== Compositions ==
=== Orchestral music ===
- Symphony No. 1, 1939
- Symphony No. 2, 1940
- Concerto for flute and chamber orchestra, 1944
- Concerto in C major for orchestra, first performance on July 1, 1953 by the Dresden Philharmonic Orchestra, conducted by Franz Jung
- Concerto in E for String Orchestra, premiere on 28 May 1955 by the Staatskapelle Dresden, conducted by Franz Konwitschny
- Concertante music no. 1, 1961
- Concertante music no. 2, 1964
- Moritzburg Concerto No. 1, 1965
- Moritzburg Concerto No. 2, 1968
- 5 concertos for harpsichord and chamber orchestra
- Sinfonietta for chamber orchestra, 1974

=== Organ works ===
- Totentanz – Variations on an old folk song: "Es ist ein Schnitter, heißt der Tod", 1944
- Organ book of the Dresden Kreuzkirche, 1950
- Suite, 1952
- Organ Suite, 1962
- Toccata, 1964
- Leksand Suite, 1966
- Fantasia, 1969
- Siljan Suite, 1970
- Metamorphosis, 1970
- Fantasy about Bells of the Cross Church (EGAHD), 1973
- Concerto for Organ and Orchestra, 1975 – premiere April 10–12, 1975 by the Dresden Philharmonic, conductor: Hartmut Haenchen
- Fantasy – Triptych, 1975
- 2 concertos for organ and vibraphone, 1978
- "Media in vita" for vibraphone and organ – premiere on 11 June 1979 at the Kreuzkirche, Dresden

=== Chamber music ===
- Suite for piano, 1945
- Sonata for flute and piano, 1954
- New piano pieces (223 movements), 1960–1962

=== Vocal music ===
- 3 Christmas carols, 1943
- St. John Passion, 1953
- Wie liegt die Stadt so wüst, 1956
- Denn wir haben hier keine bleibende Stadt, 1959
- Te Deum, 1959
- Great Psalter, 1961
- German Magnificat, 1962
- Fantasy on B–A–C–H, 1964
- Spiritual motets and chants

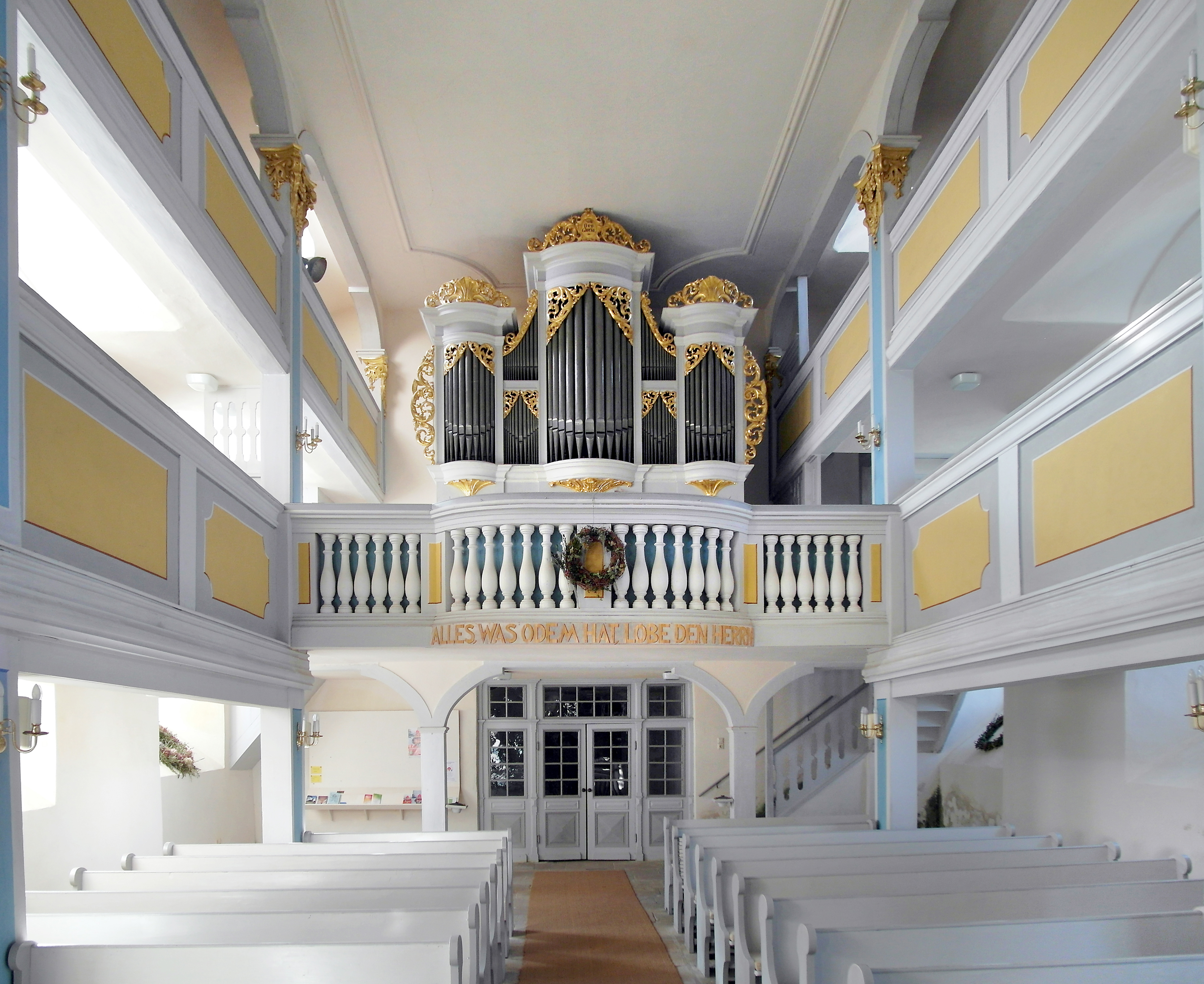
Silbermann Organ in the village church of Reinhardtsgrimma, used by Collum in his recordings of Bach's works

=== Theatre music ===
- The Prince of Homburg (Heinrich von Kleist), incidental music conducted by Fritz Wendel, Staatsschauspiel Dresden, 1955

== Recordings ==
- Metamorphose für Orgel (1970)
- Kleine Messe für Positiv
- Totentanz: Variationen über ein altes Volkslied für Orgel "Es ist ein Schnitter, heißt der Tod" (1979)
- Christum wir sollen loben, Christmas Motet; small choral partita for mixed choir a cappella
- Bach: Französische Suiten (1–6)
- Bach: Das Orgelwerk auf Silbermann-Orgeln
- List of 71 compositions by Collum in the German National Library.
