= Church of Reinhardtsgrimma =

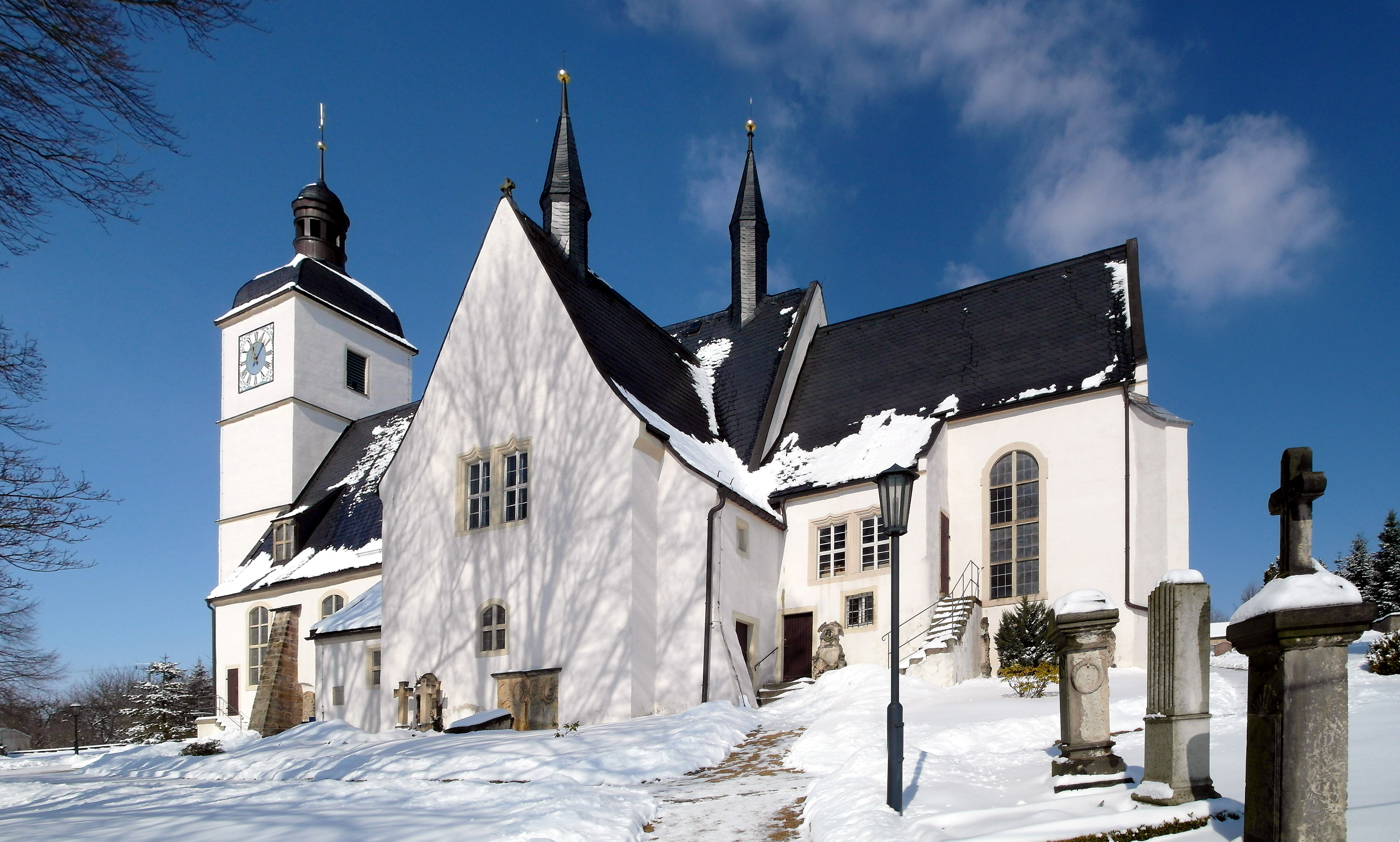

- 50°53′38″N 13°45′12″E
- Location: Reinhardtsgrimma, Saxony
- Country: Germany
- Denomination: Lutheran

History
- Status: Parish church

Architecture
- Style: Baroque
- Completed: 1742

The Church of Reinhardtsgrimma is a Lutheran parish church in Reinhardtsgrimma, a part of Glashütte in Sächsische Schweiz-Osterzgebirge in Saxony, Germany. It contains a pipe organ built in 1731 to the designs of Gottfried Silbermann.

== Architecture ==
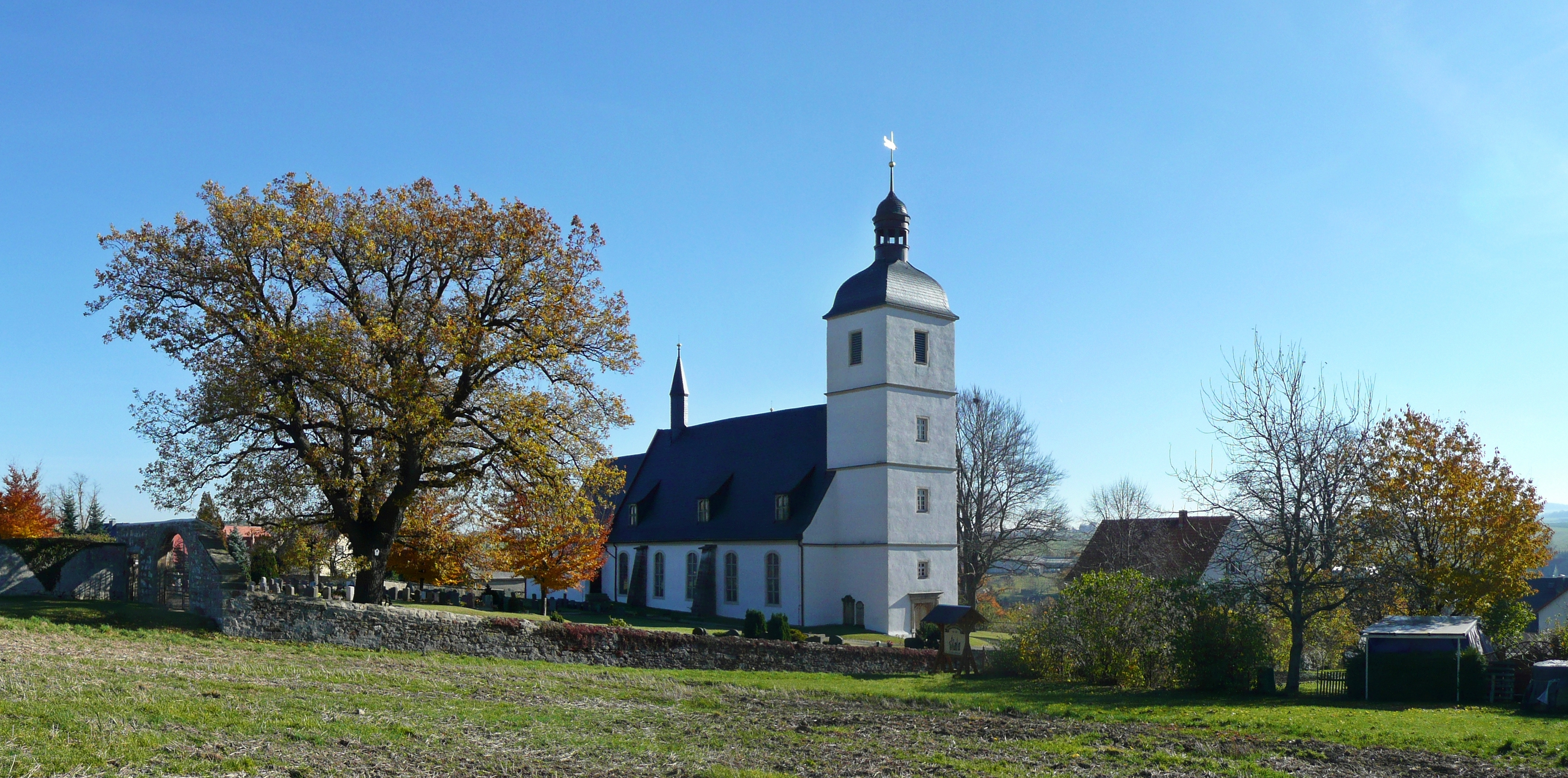
Bell tower

The church was refurbished in 1742. The building consists of a long, narrow nave, two small ridge turrets and a massive bell tower in the west. The choir is covered by two late Gothic fan vaults.

== Interior ==
The altar with the relief of the Last Supper was carved in 1602 and refurbished in 1836. The pulpit was built around 1670, and its stairway was decorated with paintings by Jacob Hennig from Pirna in 1672.

== Pipe organ ==
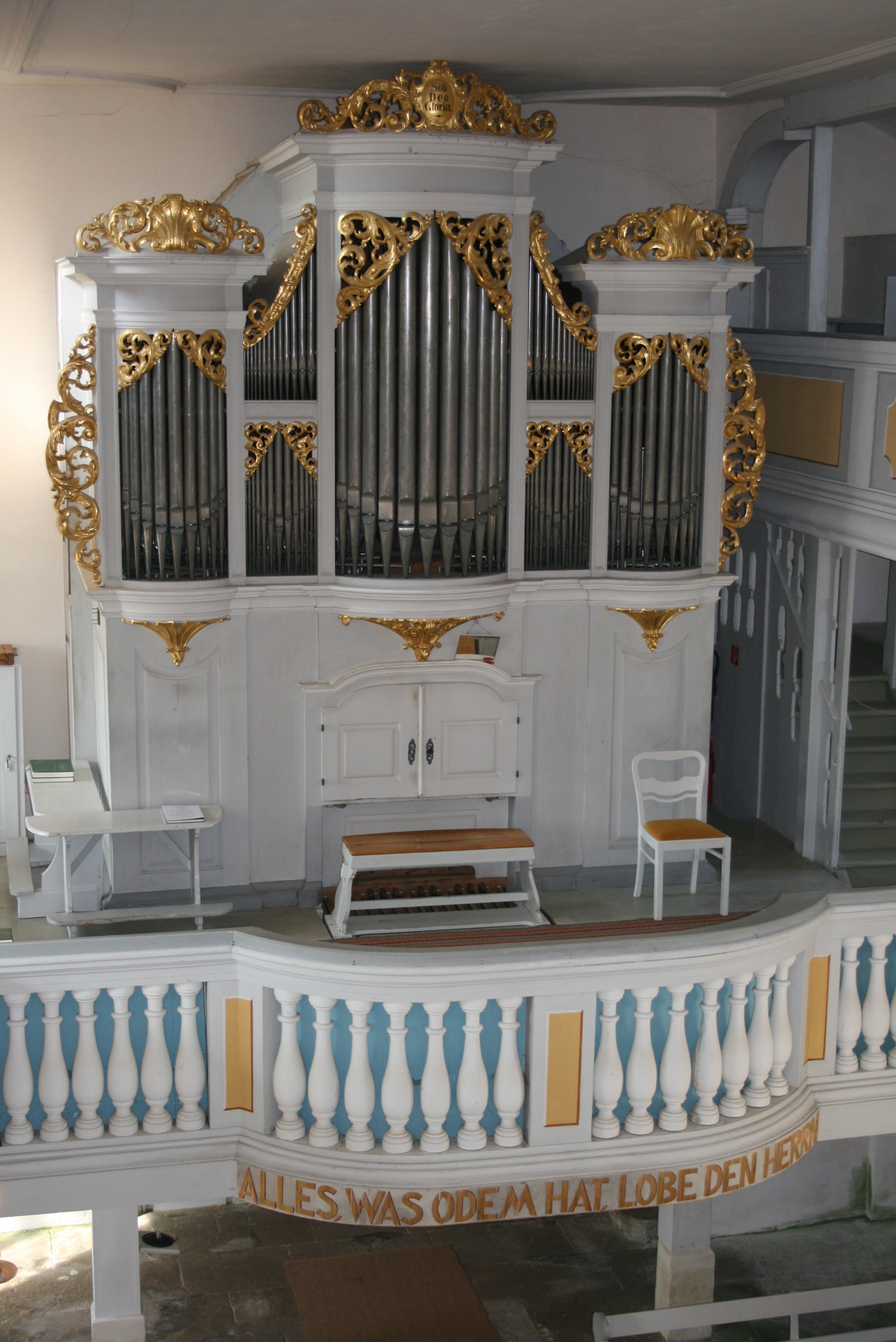
Organ of Gottfried Silbermann in Reinhardtsgrimma

The masterpiece of the church is the organ by Gottfried Silbermann, which was inaugurated in 1731.

Fugue by J S Bach
Fugue in G minor, BWV 542 performed by Herbert Collum on the Silbermann organ, Reinhardtsgrimma

Gottfried Silbermann investigated the old organ in October 1725, as requested by Christiane Eleonore von Trettau née von Berbisdorf, who was the widow of the chamberlain of Schloss Reinhardtsgrimma. The old organ stood in an inappropriate position in the choir and was still tuned with the non-equal division of the octave. Silbermann concluded that the organ was beyond repair and offered in his proposal of 17 October 1725 a concept of a new instrument, an only slightly larger organ with two manuals. He estimated the cost at 800 thaler excluding painting and carpentry, which at that time was an amount equal to the salary of a medium to senior civil servant. Additionally, he wanted to be reimbursed for transport and lodging. The contract was probably signed in June 1729, when Silbermann agreed to provide a guarantee during his lifetime, and accepted to be paid in six rates until the end of 1732.

The organ had Gottfried Silberman's serial number op. 21. It was sanctified on 6 January 1731. Its approval was granted by Emanuel Behnisch, then the organist of the Kreuzkirche, Dresden, who commented that he found the new organ good in all parts ("[für] allenthalben tüchtig befunden").

Refurbishments were conducted in 1852 by the organ builder Karl Traugott Stöckel of Dippoldiswalde and in 1940 by Gebr. Jehmlich in Dresden. The last large restoration was carried out in 1997 by Kristian Wegscheider. The most important tasks were the new intonation of the organ pipes, the reconstruction of the V-shaped bellows of the wind system and tuning according to the meantone temperament.

The following table list the organ stops in the original nomenclature of Gottfried Silbermann:

I Hauptwerk CD–c^{3} [Great]
Principal	8′
Rohr=Fleute	8′
Qvinta dena	8′
Octava	4′
Spiz=Fleute	4′
Qvinta	3′
Octava	2′
Cornett III (ab c^{1})
Mixtur IV

II Hinterwerk CD–c^{3} [Swell]
Gedacktes	8′
Rohr=Fleute	4′
Naßat	3′
Tertia	2′ (1 3/5′)
Qvinta	1 ½′
Suffleute	1′
Zÿmbeln II

Pedal CD–c^{1} [Pedal]
Sub Baß	16′
Octaven Baß	8′
Posaunen Baß	16′

- Couplers: II/I (Manualschiebekoppel), I/P
- Additional organ stops: Tremulant
- Pitch: Chorton, a^{1}=465 Hz
- Tuning: Originally "well tempered"; since 1997 a newly developed temperament by Kristian Wegscheider

The organist Helmut Walcha wrote about this organ in 1933:

I got the strongest impression on my trip by the Silbermann organ in Reinhardtsgrimma. This work of Silberman with two manuals, which I had not known before, is one of the nicest organs that I know. The sound of this really enchantingly beautiful organ actually cannot be properly described. ("Den stärksten Eindruck auf meiner Reise erhielt ich mit einer Silbermann Orgel in Reinhardtsgrimma. Dieses mir bisher unbekannte, zweimanualige Werk Silbermanns zählt zu den schönsten Orgeln die ich kenne. Der Klang dieser geradezu bezaubernd schönen Orgel ist eigentlich unbeschreiblich…") Source: Zeitschrift für Kirchenmusik, 1933.

The main organist of the Kreuzkirche, the Kreuzorganist Herbert Collum, so admired this "little miracle in the art of organ building" ("das kleine Wunder der Orgelbaukunst"), that he initiated an annual series of Collum Concerts in the church, always beginning on Ascension Day.
