= Tutima =

German watchmaker

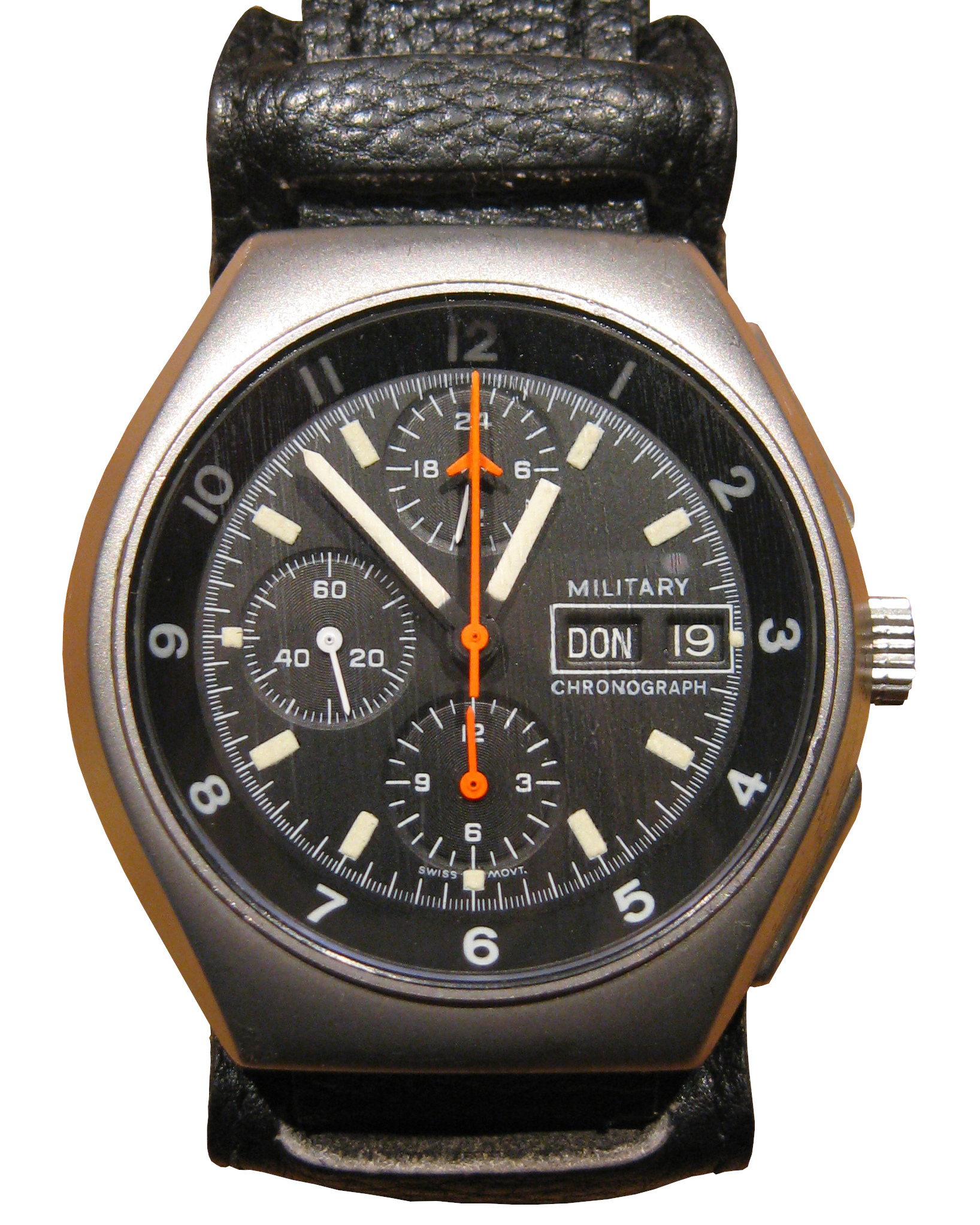
Tutima "Fliegerchronograph", the official NATO pilot watch

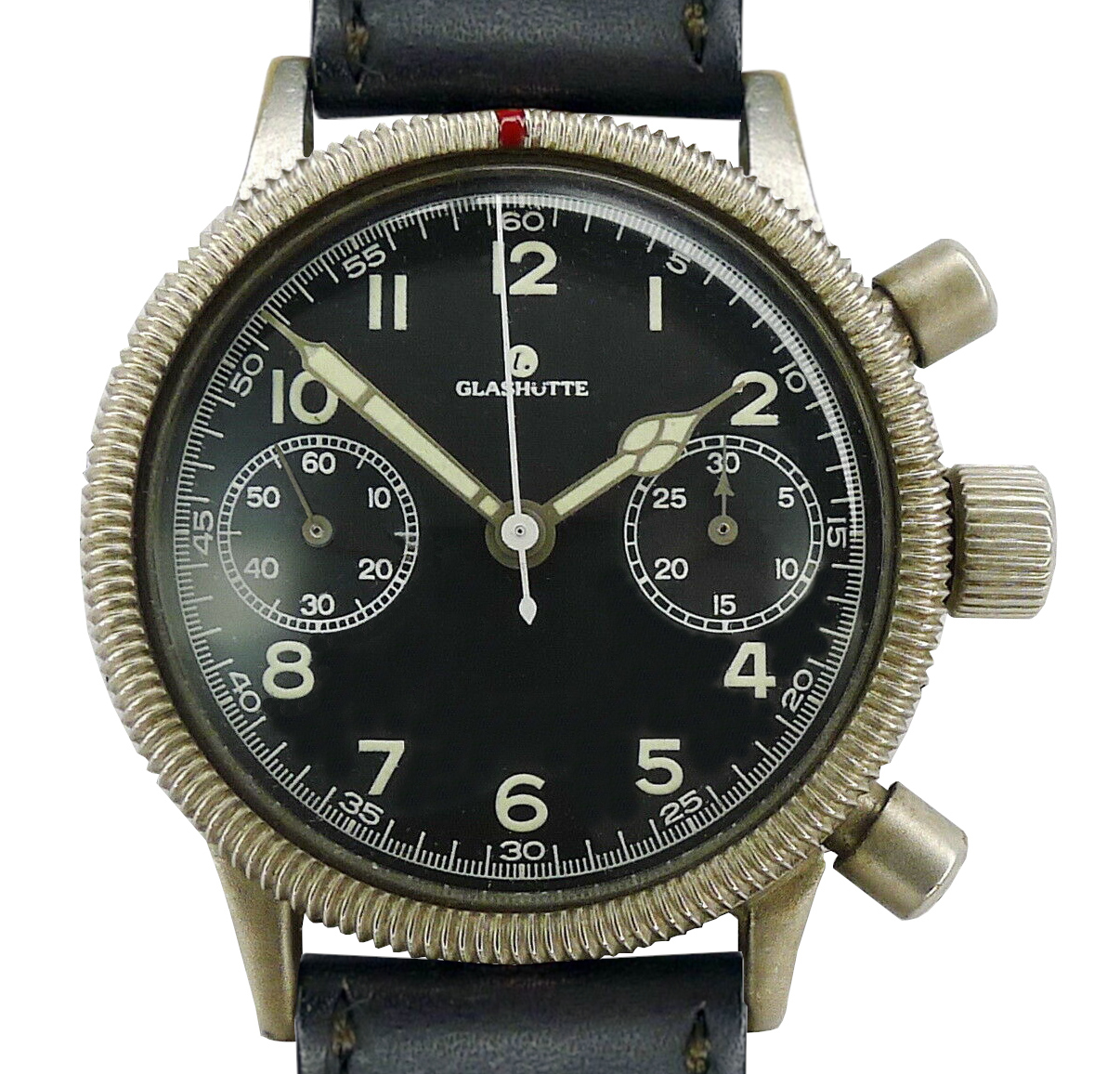
Tutima Glashütte Fliegerchronograph, which was produced during WWII for the German military, then named the Wehrmacht

Tutima Uhrenfabrik GmbH Ndl. Glashütte is a German watchmaker established in 1927 in Glashütte, Saxony.

Their products include analog chronographs of high precision, including pilot's watches (Fliegerchronograph), which are standard military equipment of NATO and Luftwaffe pilots.

Tutima has five product lines made in Glashütte: Patria, M2, Saxon One, Grand Flieger, and Sky.

Tutima Germany is registered with HRB 140173 at Amtsgericht Delmenhorst and is a member of Industrie und Handelskammer Oldenburg. The brand Tutima has been registered since 7 April 1970. Tutima USA, Inc., an independent company, is based in Torrance, California. Since 1991, quartz watches with skin-friendly titanium cases have also been manufactured under the name Boccia Titanium for a lower price segment.

== See also ==
- List of German watch manufacturers
- Glashütte Original
