= Reinhardtsgrimma =

- Village of Glashütte
- Coat of arms
- Interactive map of Reinhardtsgrimma
- Location within Germany Location within Saxony
- Coordinates: 50°53′33″N 13°45′15″E
- Country: Germany
- State: Saxony
- District: Sächsische Schweiz-Osterzgebirge
- Town: Glashütte
- Subdivisions: 7

Area
  - Total: 53.81 km^{2} (20.78 sq mi)
- Elevation: 332 m (1,089 ft)

Population (2006-12-31)
  - Total: 3,002
  - Density: 55.79/km^{2} (144.5/sq mi)
- Time zone: UTC+01:00 (CET)
  - Summer (DST): UTC+02:00 (CEST)
- Postal codes: 01768
- Dialling codes: 03504, 035053
- Vehicle registration: PIR
- Website: www.reinhardtsgrimma.de

Reinhardtsgrimma is a former municipality in the district of Weißeritzkreis in Saxony in Germany located near Dresden. On 2 January 2008, it merged into the town Glashütte. Its church features an organ by Gottfried Silbermann.
