= Glashütte Original =

German luxury watch brand

Glashütter Uhrenbetrieb GmbH
- Trade name: Glashütte Original
- Type: Subsidiary
- Industry: Watchmaking
- Founded: 1994 (in current form)
- Owner: The Swatch Group
- Website: www.glashuette-original.com

Glashütte Original is a German producer of luxury watches founded in 1994 by the privatization of VEB Glashütter Uhrenbetriebe (GUB), an East German conglomerate formed in 1951 from the watch companies based in Glashütte. Glashütte Original uses its own movements, and has 10 proprietary movement innovations. Glashütte Original is currently owned by the Swatch Group.

== History ==
=== Origins ===
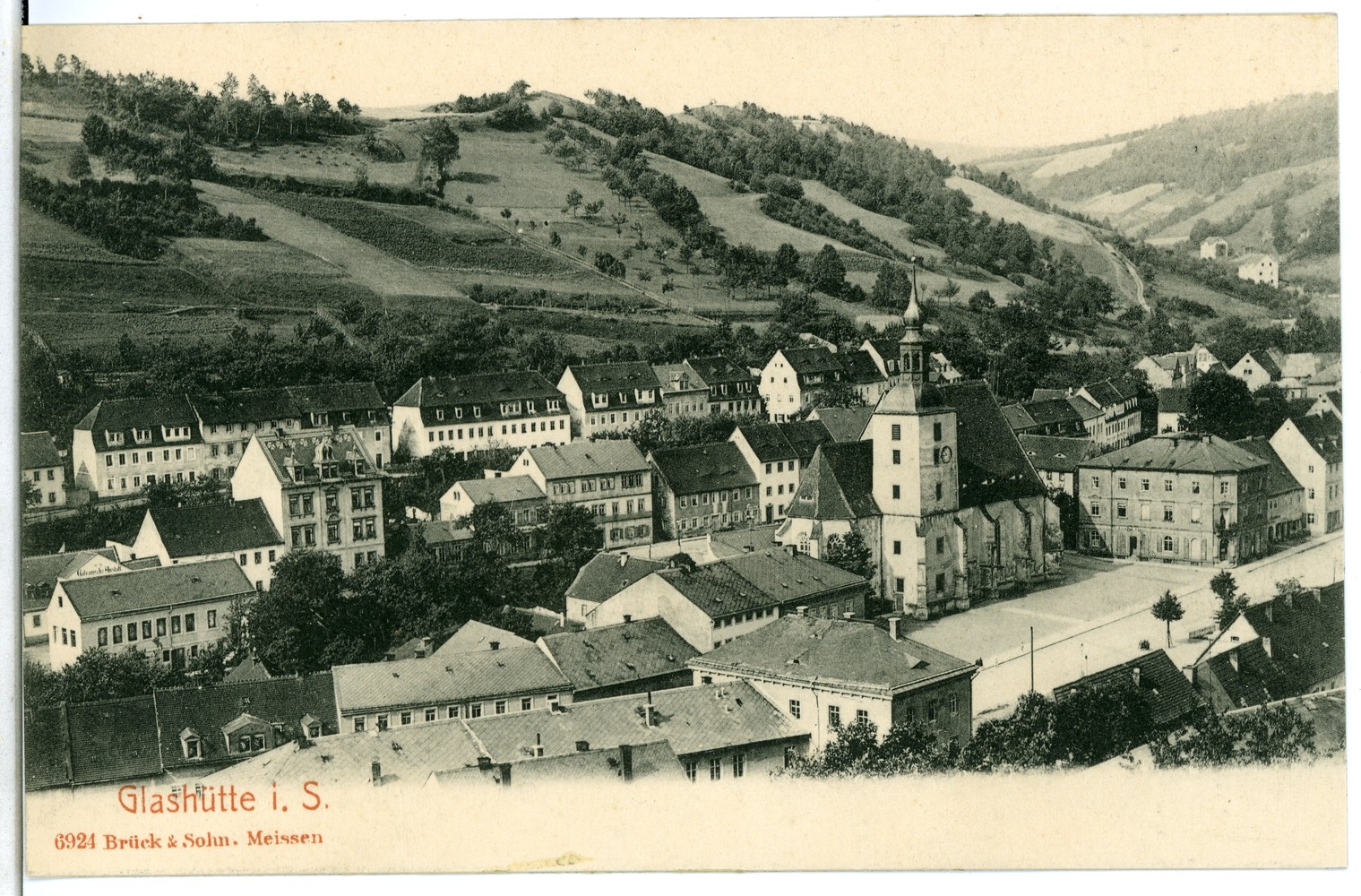
Glashütte in 1906

Glashütte Original has roots dating back to 1845 when watchmakers Ferdinand Adolph Lange (of A. Lange & Söhne fame), Moritz Grossman, Julius Assmann, and Adolf Schneider came to Glashütte to manufacture watch parts and pocket watches. They chose this area for its proximity to Dresden's already established clockwork fame. The work of these founders led to innovations that became signature components of Glashütte watchmaking and are continued to this day, such as the Glashütte three-quarter plate, gold lever wheels, and chatons, all developed in 1865 and all increasing timekeeping precision. After successfully petitioning the King of Saxony for a business loan, Moritz Grossman founded the German School of Watchmaking in the town of Glashütte in 1878.

Various independent watchmakers rose to prominence in the town of Glashütte, aided by the constant influx of talent from that nearby School of Watchmaking. Known for their high quality, Glashütte timepieces grew in popularity until World War I and the depression caused by hyperinflation in Weimar Germany that followed, which dramatically affected sales.

The issue worsened when World War II broke out, leaving the town of Glashütte in rubble after a devastating bombing in the final days of the war, which leveled the town.

=== GUB-Era ===
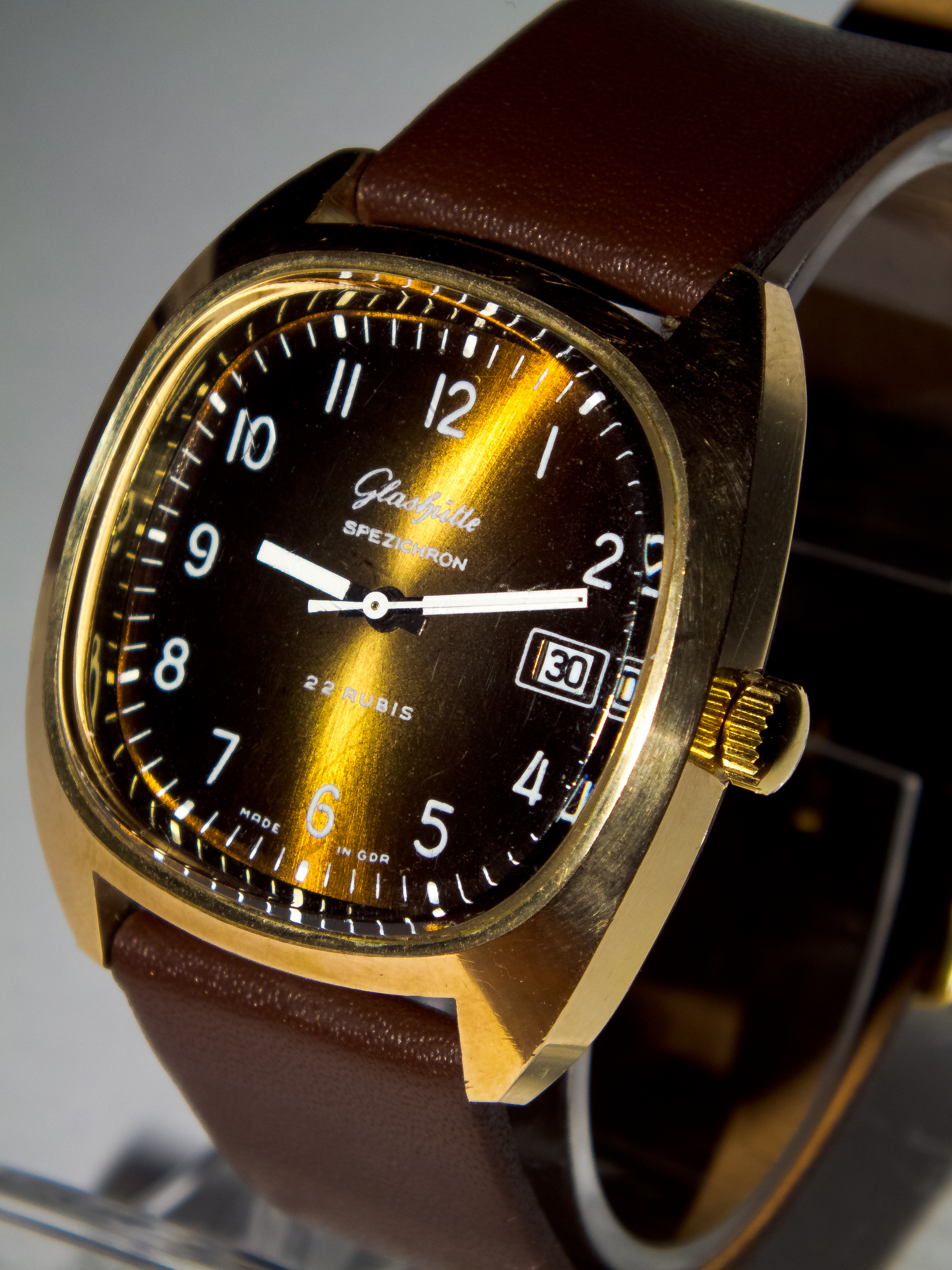
GUB-era Spezichron from 1979-'85 (note that the dial says "Made in GDR" instead of "Made in Germany")

In addition to the wartime destruction, the partition of Germany in 1949 meant that the town of Glashütte was now part of communist East Germany. With many wartime reparations mandated by the Western Allies, the Soviet Union seized much of the remaining watchmaking machinery from Glashütte.

Under this East German (also known as the German Democratic Republic, or GDR) government the only horological company allowed to operate was the state-run VEB Glashütte Uhrenbetriebe (GUB), formed in 1951 as a forced collectivization formed by all seven of the horological companies of Glashütte. Among these seven companies, UROFA and UFAG (now Tutima) and A. Lange & Söhne (resurrected by the great-grandson of Ferdinand Adolph Lange in 1990) were the most noteworthy, with A. Lange & Söhne having provided timepieces for royalty and dignitaries around the world.

While Western watchmakers were developing technology related to and weighing the impact of the quartz crisis of the 1970s and 1980s, GUB, significantly insulated from capitalist market demands by the Iron Curtain, instead continued to focus on traditional mechanical movements. Some of the mechanical movements (calibers) produced during the GUB era are:

- Automat (GUB 67 and GUB 68) 1960–1968
- Spezimatic (GUB 74 and GUB 75) 1965–1979
- Spezichron (GUB 11–25, GUB 11–26, and GUB 11–27) 1979–1985
- Spezimat (GUB 10–30) from 1990 (some products with this movement were released under the labels Glashütte Original or Union Glashütte)

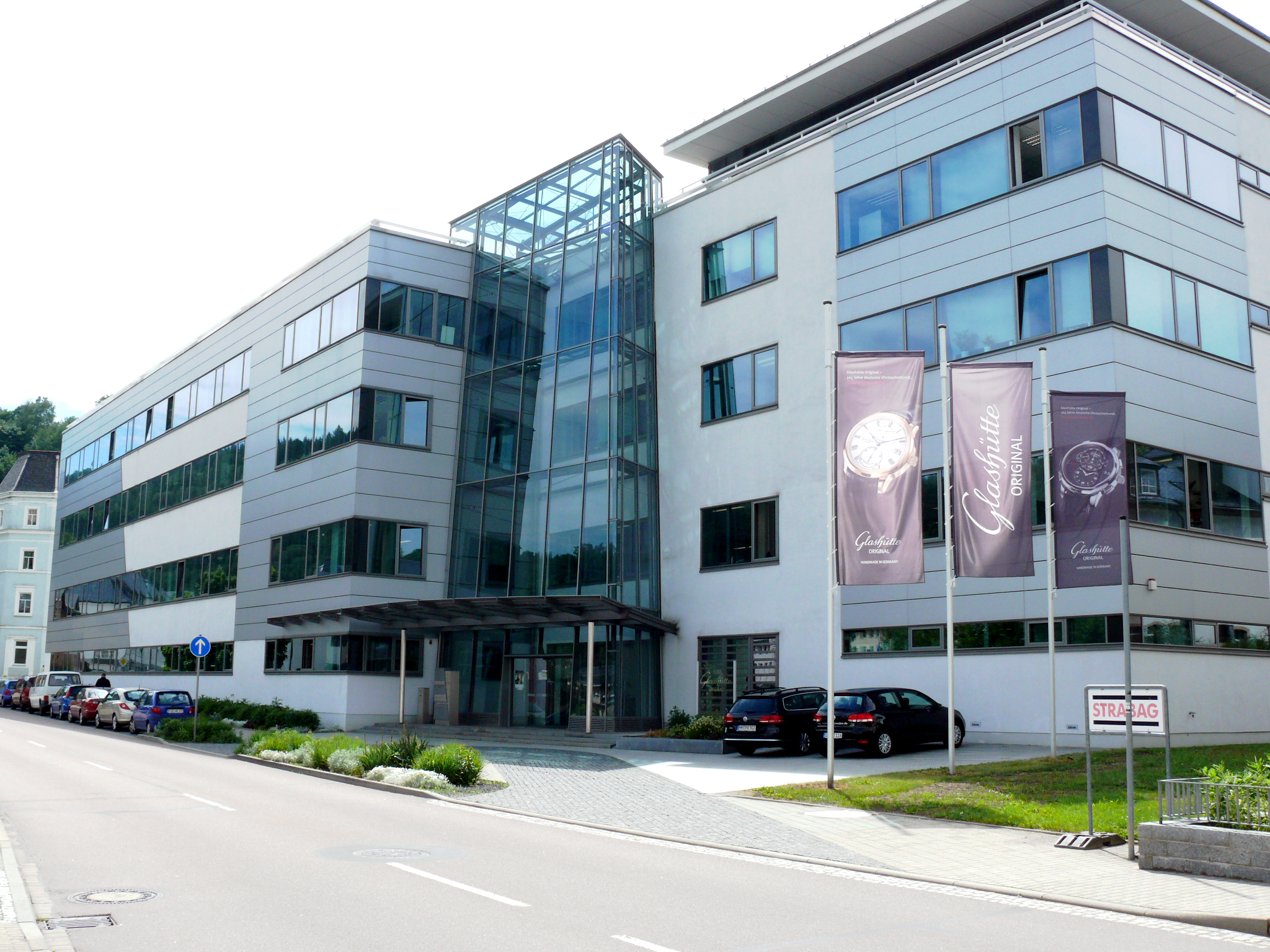
Glashütte Original Headquarters in 2012

=== Post-Reunification ===
After the reunification of Germany and the return of market economics to the former East Germany, the remaining components of Glashütter Uhrenbetrieb GmbH (GUB) were registered as a private business once again in 1990. In 1994, Heinz W. Pfeifer bought the now tiny company of 72 employees, renaming it Glashütte Original and bringing back the traditional Glashütte watchmaking handiwork. Having succeeded in this effort, in 2000 the reinvigorated Glashütte Original was bought by the Swatch Group, the largest watch group in the world.

Even today, due to its unique history in the watchmaking world, Glashütte Original is known for making nearly 95% of all components in-house. Since 2002, Glashütte Original has also run the Alfred Helwig School of Watchmaking to keep the Glashütte tradition alive. This school is named after the Glashütte-based watchmaker, Alfred Helwig, who invented the flying tourbillon in 1921, a major horological innovation that can be seen on extremely high-end timepieces.

== Name ==
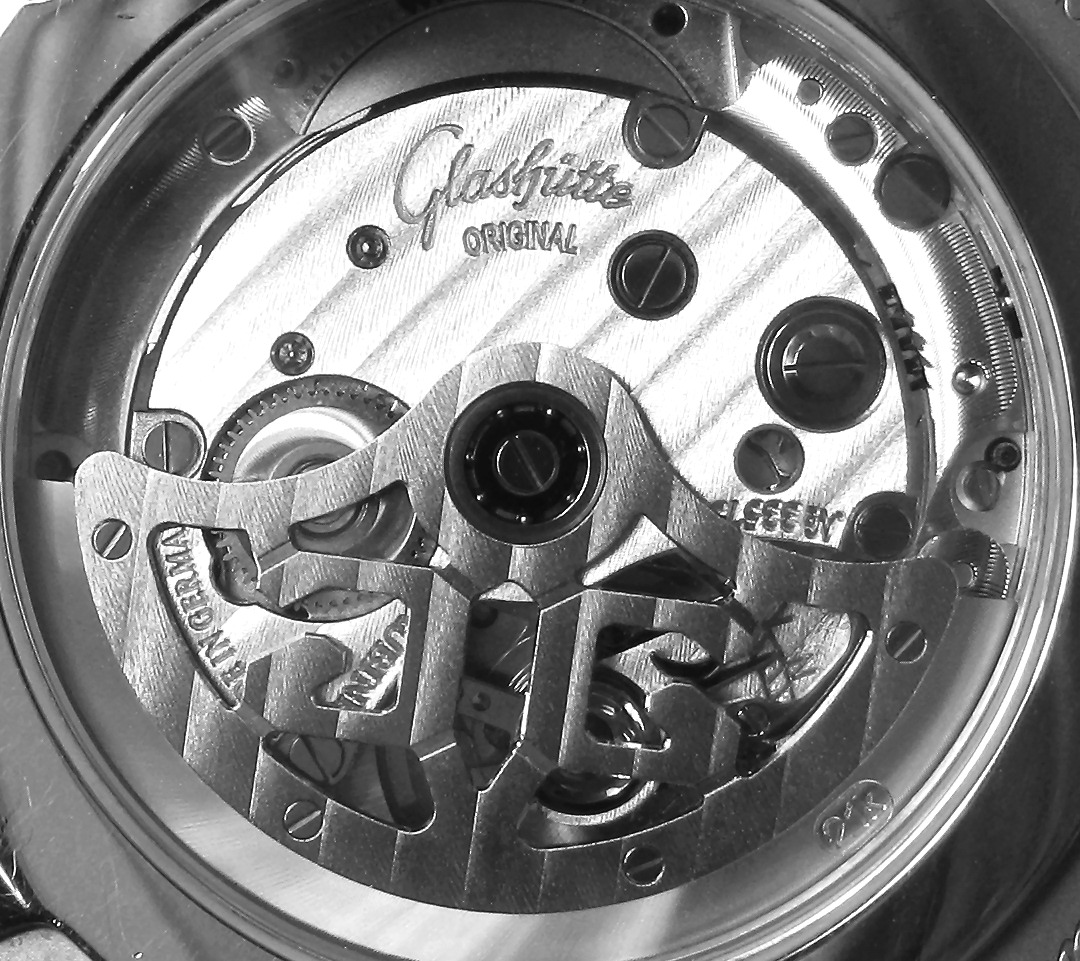
"Glashütte Original" inscription on a modern movement

Glashütte is the German town where the watch factory is based. It is pronounced [ˈɡlaːs.hʏtə]. By German orthographic convention, this would be written Glashuette, if an umlaut ü is not available, but it often appears internationally as Glashutte.

The modern name "Glashütte Original" is a reference back to the early days of watchmaking in the Glashütte region. In an attempt to sell inferior movements for a premium price, less renowned watchmaking areas were adding the term "System Glashütte" to their timepieces and often simulating traditional Glashütte decoration and finishing work. As a response, the watchmaking houses in Glashütte started inscribing the word "Original" to their watch movements and clockwork to indicate that a given timepiece was really from Glashütte.

== Products ==
The products offered by Glashütte Original now includes five model ranges, each subdivided into different models. These model series are:

- Senator
- Pano
- Specialist
- Vintage
- Ladies

Each Glashütte Original wristwatch is provided with an exclusive four-digit serial number. This contributes to exclusivity, since a maximum of 9,999 pieces per model are possible, as well as prevents counterfeiting where, in the event of theft, a specific timepiece can be returned to the original owner.

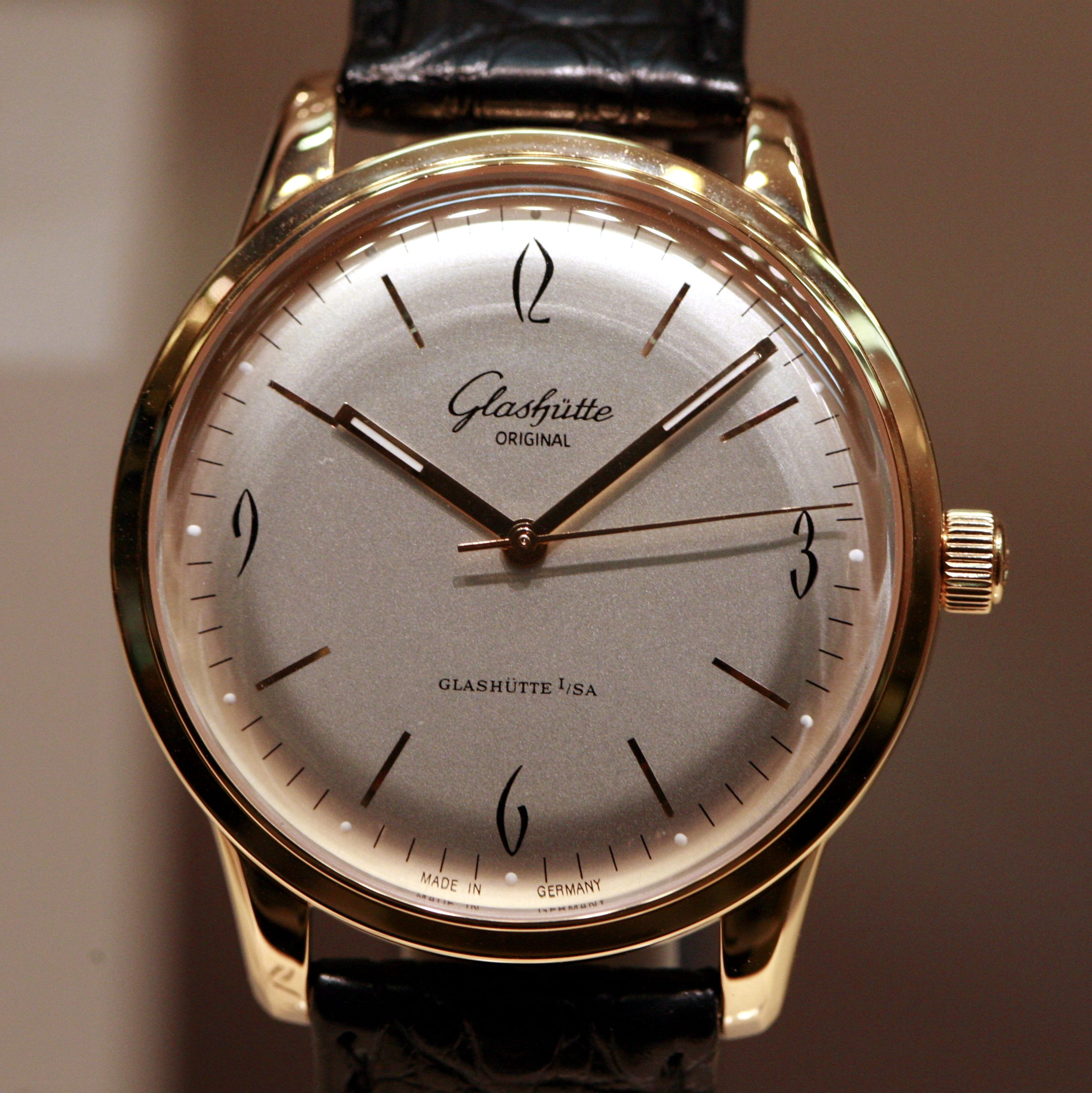
The Senator Sixties model

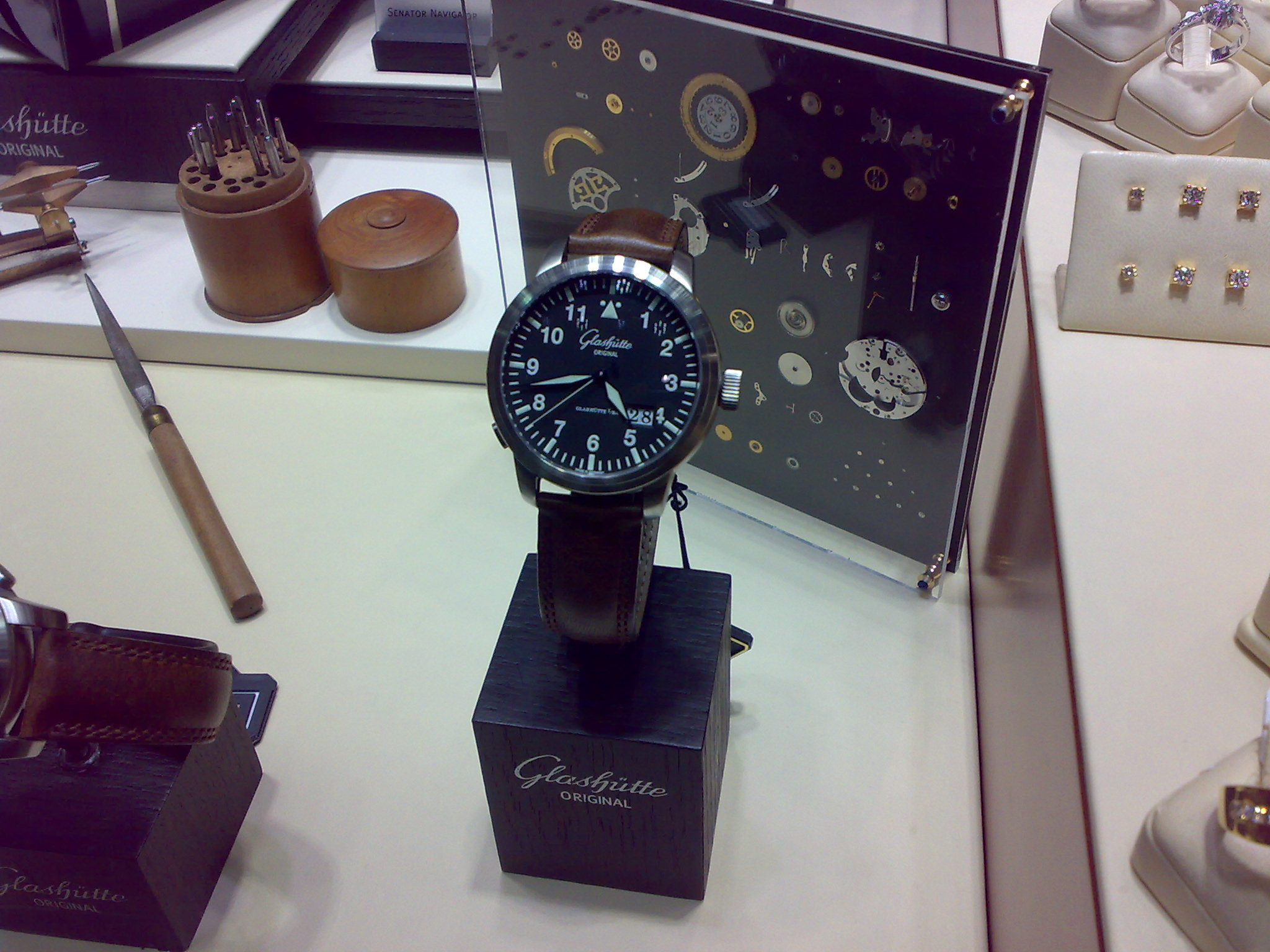
The Senator Navigator model with traditional Glashütte Panorama Date

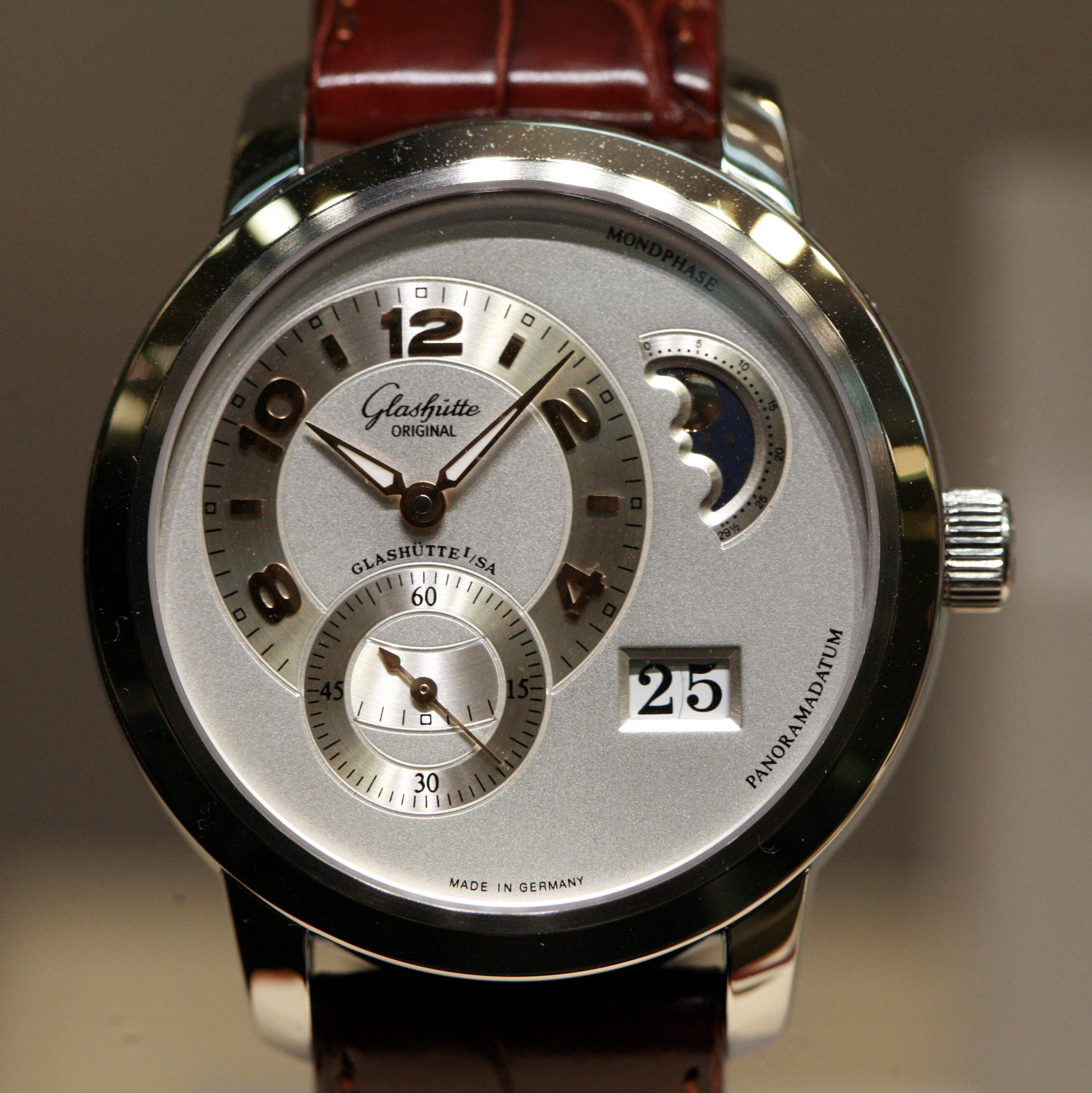
The Panomatic Lunar model

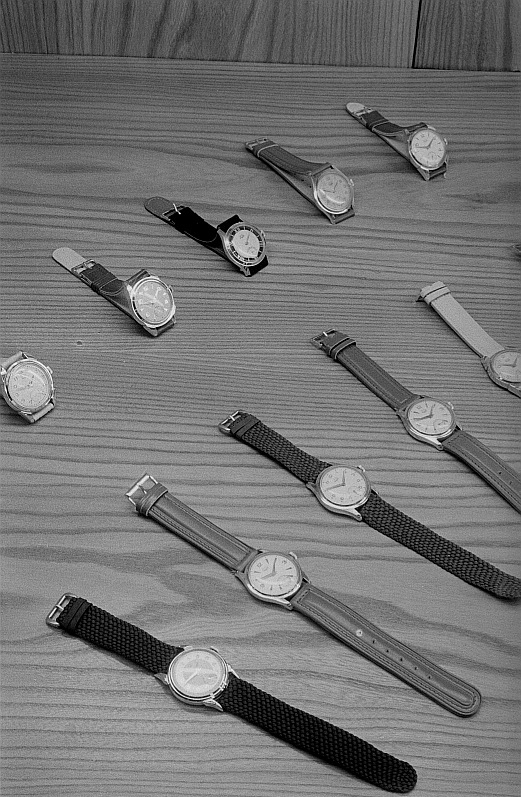
GUB-era models from the 1950s (Cal. 60)

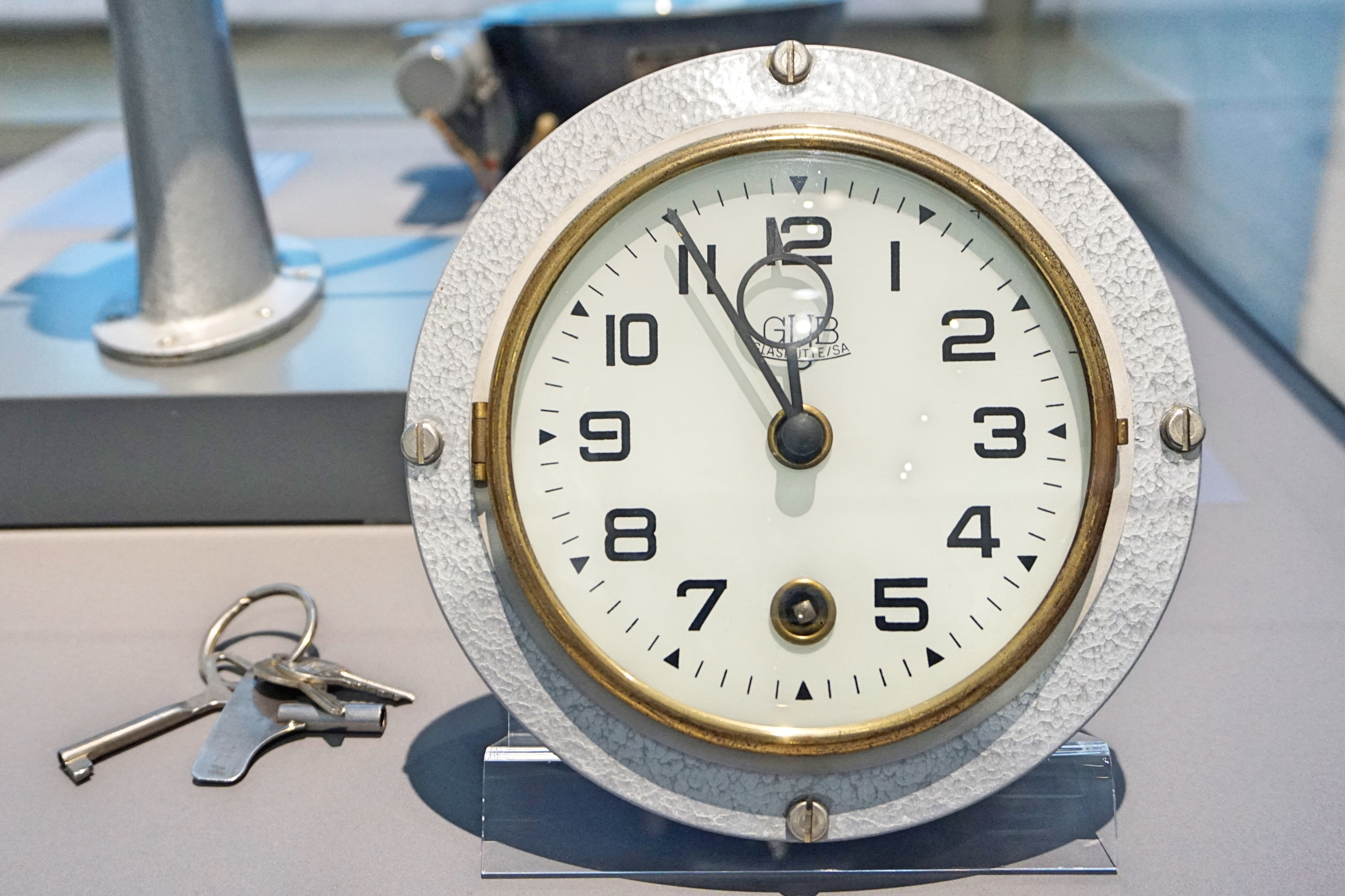
GUB-era desk clock from the late 1950s

== See also ==
- List of German watch manufacturers
- A. Lange & Söhne
- Tutima
- Nomos Glashütte
- Mühle Glashütte
