= Glashütte =

Town in Saxony, Germany

- Town
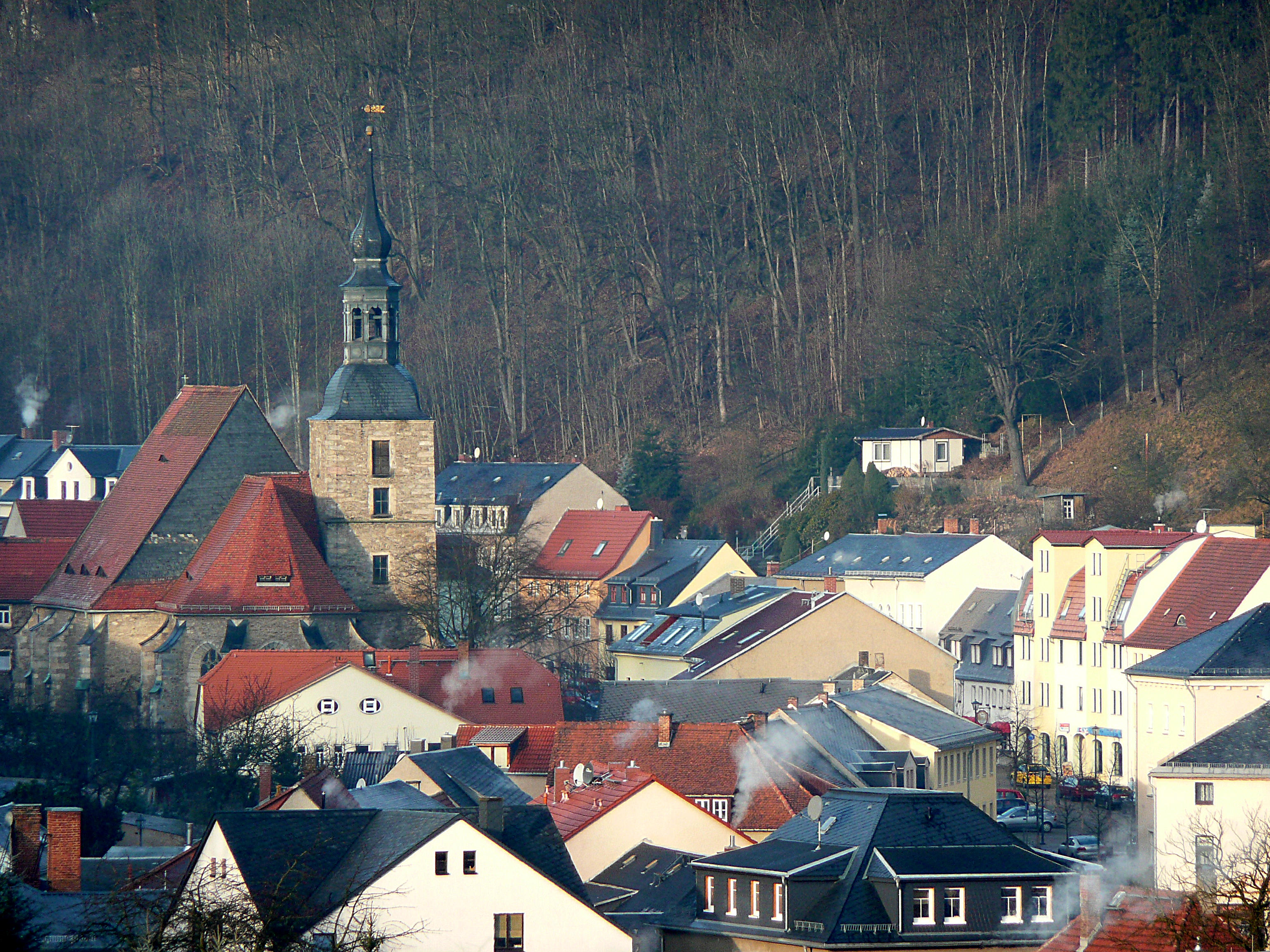

- Coat of arms

- Location of Glashütte within Sächsische Schweiz-Osterzgebirge district
- Interactive map of Glashütte
- Location within Germany Location within Saxony
- Coordinates: 50°51′N 13°47′E
- Country: Germany
- State: Saxony
- District: Sächsische Schweiz-Osterzgebirge
- Subdivisions: 13

Government
  - Mayor (2021–28): Sven Gleißberg (CDU)

Area
  - Total: 95.64 km^{2} (36.93 sq mi)
- Elevation: 340 m (1,120 ft)

Population (2025-12-31)
  - Total: 6,304
  - Density: 65.91/km^{2} (170.7/sq mi)
- Time zone: UTC+01:00 (CET)
  - Summer (DST): UTC+02:00 (CEST)
- Postal codes: 01768
- Dialling codes: 035053
- Vehicle registration: PIR
- Website: www.glashuette-sachs.de

Glashütte (German pronunciation: [ˈɡlaːsˌhʏtə]) is a town in Saxony, Germany, known as the birthplace of the German watchmaking industry and has a population of about 7,000. Historically, it was first mentioned in a document circa 1445. In January 2008, the former municipality Reinhardtsgrimma was merged into Glashütte.

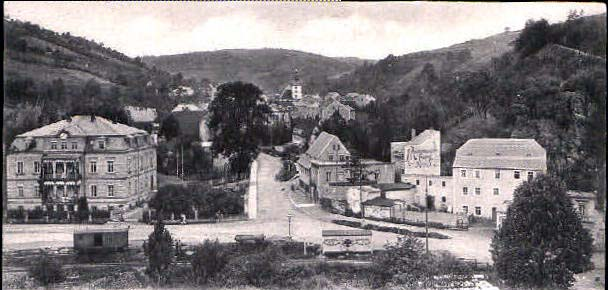
Glashütte around 1910

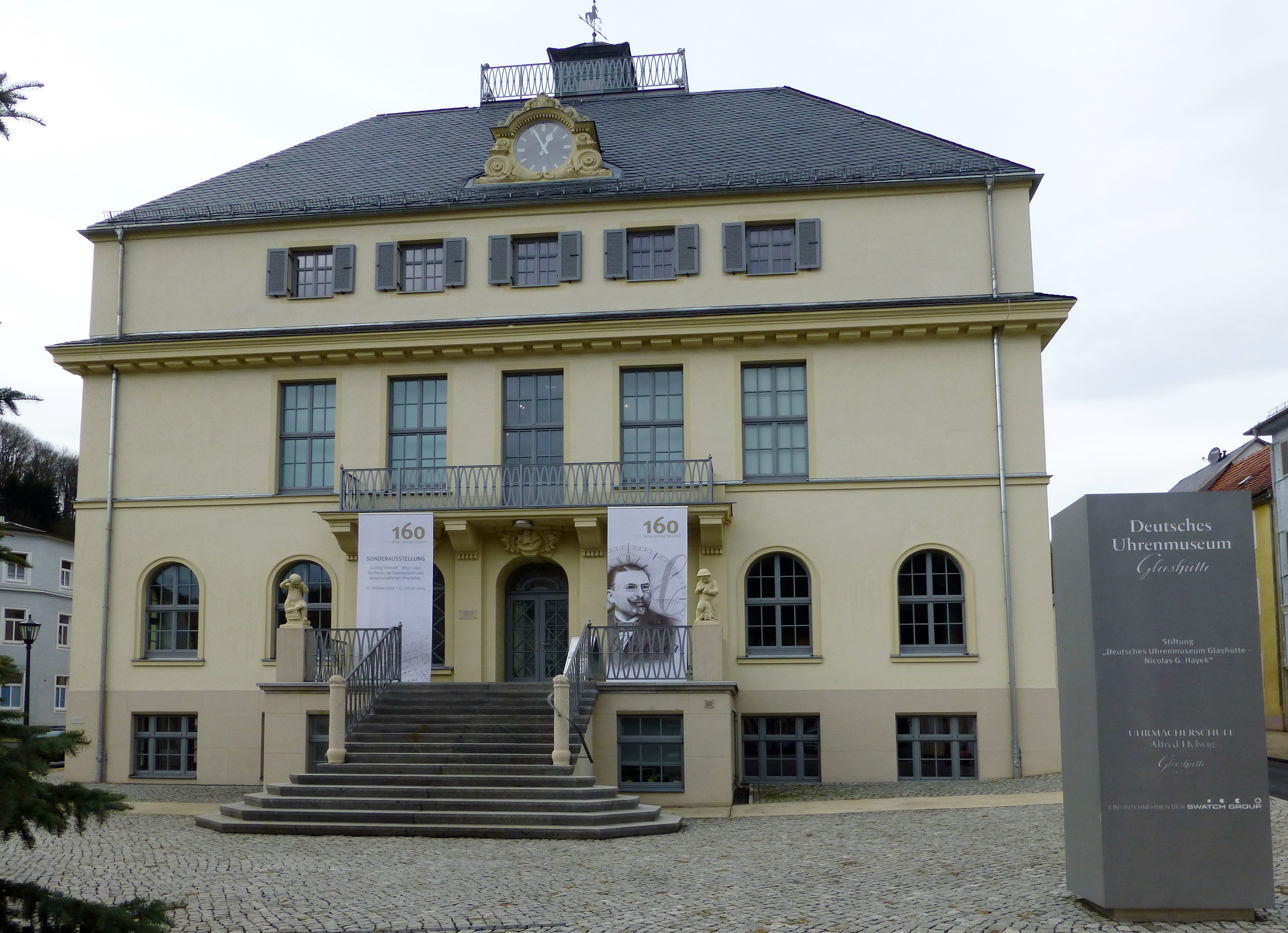
Watch museum Glashütte

Watches currently made in this location include:

- A. Lange & Söhne
- Bruno Söhnle
- C. H. Wolf
- Glashütte Original
- Mühle Glashütte
- NOMOS Glashütte
- Wempe Chronometerwerke
- Tutima
- Union Glashütte
- Moritz Grossmann

== Notable people ==
- Ferdinand Adolph Lange (1815–1875), watchmaker, founder of A. Lange & Söhne, Member of Saxon Landtag 1857–1875, mayor of Glashütte 1848–1866
- Arthur Burkhardt (1857–1918), engineer and manufacturer
- Hans-Peter Kaul (1943–2014), judge, international lawyer and diplomat
