= A. Lange & Söhne =

German luxury watch brand

Coordinates: 50.851498°N 13.781242°E

Lange Uhren GmbH
- Type: Subsidiary
- Industry: Luxury watchmaking
- Founded: 1845; 1990 (Re-launched)
- Founder: Ferdinand Adolph Lange
- Fate: Nationalised 1948, reformed 1990
- Headquarters: Glashütte, Germany
- Area served: Worldwide
- Key people: Wilhelm Schmid (CEO)
- Products: Watches
- Production output: Around 5,000
- Number of employees: 770
- Parent: Richemont
- Website: www.alange-soehne.com

A. Lange & Söhne is a trademark of Lange Uhren GmbH, a German manufacturer of luxury and prestige watches. The company was originally founded by Ferdinand Adolph Lange in Glashütte, Kingdom of Saxony, in 1845. The original A. Lange & Söhne was nationalized and ceased to exist in 1948, following the occupation by the Soviet Union after World War II. The current A. Lange & Söhne trademark was re-registered when Lange Uhren GmbH was founded in 1990 by Walter Lange, the great-grandson of Ferdinand Adolph Lange.

A. Lange & Söhne is a highly regarded watch manufacturer. Notable early patrons and timepieces owners of Lange included German Emperor Wilhelm II, Abdul Hamid II of the Ottoman Empire, and Alexander II of Russia. Since 2000, Lange Uhren GmbH has been a subsidiary of the Swiss Richemont Group. Lange watches boast distinctive Glashütte style in appearance and design, which is different from and more "Teutonic" than Swiss styles. The company's current model families are Lange 1, Zeitwerk, Saxonia, 1815, Richard Lange and Odysseus.

== History ==
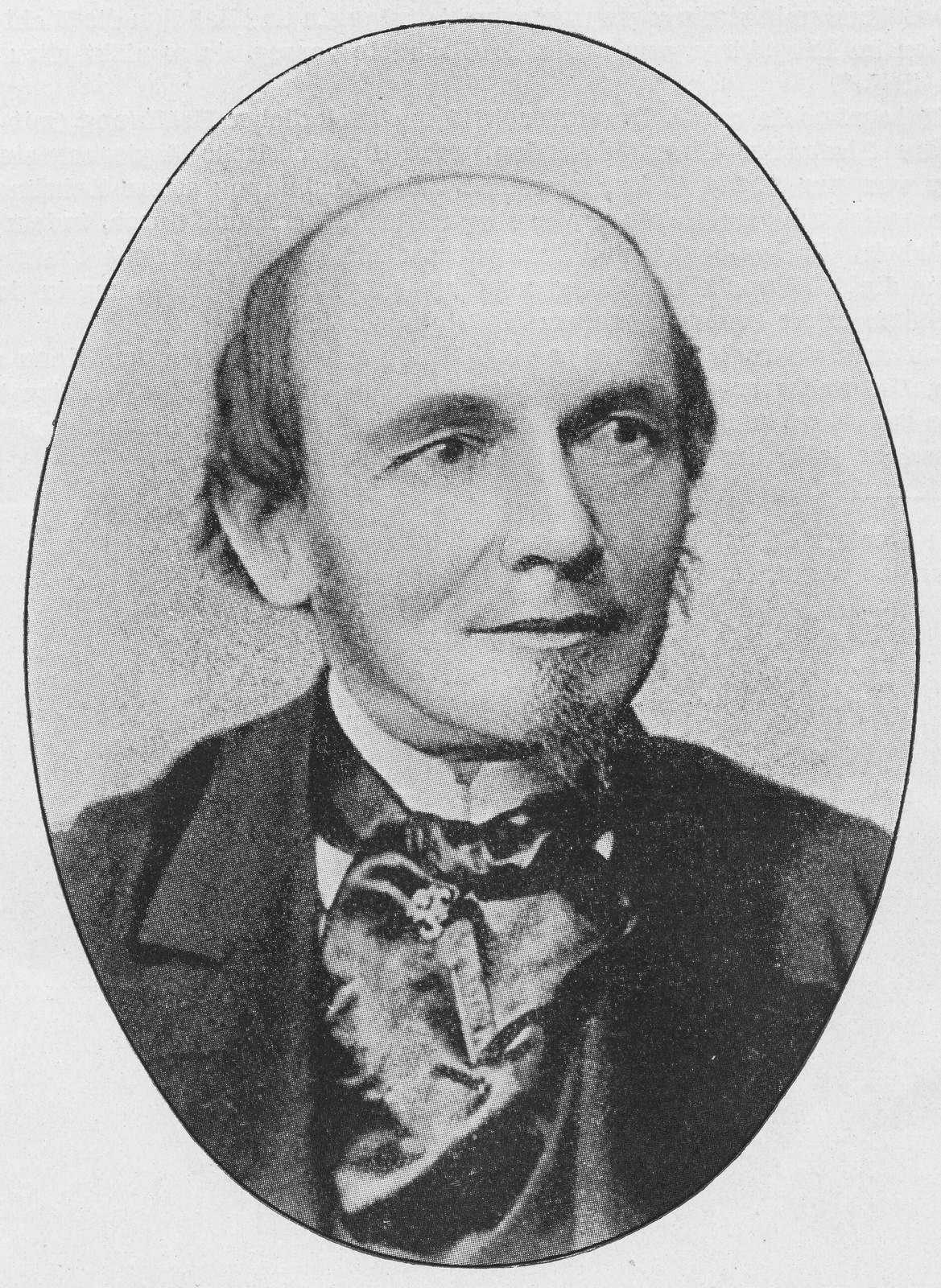
Ferdinand Adolph Lange

=== Early history ===
Ferdinand Adolph Lange, son of Johann Samuel Lange, was born in Dresden on 25 February 1815. When his parents were separated, he was adopted by a foster family, who luckily offered him a chance of proper education. In 1829, he entered the Technische Bildungsanstalt (technical education institute) of Dresden. The training in the school was accompanied by three days of theoretical studies and the other three days were devoted to manual craftwork with a student's master. Ferdinand Adolph Lange's master was Johann Christian Friedrich Gutkaes (the maker of the famous Five-Minute Clock at Dresden's Semperoper), who at the time was second mechanic at the Mathematics and Physics Salon providing an astronomical clock with a mercury compensation pendulum for his service observatory.

After finishing his apprenticeship with honours in 1835, Ferdinand A. Lange worked for Gutkaes for more than two years. In 1837 Lange embarked on his journeyman years, which took him to France, England and Switzerland. In Paris, he spent four years working as workshop manager of Austrian watchmaker Joseph Thaddäus Winnerl (inventor of the split-seconds chronograph). The lectures given by the physician and director of the Paris Observatory Dominique François Arago extended his knowledge of astronomy. After France, he went to Switzerland and Great Britain to improve his knowledge and skills even further with well-known watchmakers. However, Lange's intention was to set up a watchmaking industry in Saxony. He returned to Dresden in 1841 and became partners with his master's business.

Lange wasted no time in building complicated watches to put into practice what he learnt through his journey years, which all noted in his notebook. His main ambition was the industrialization of the area as he made verbal proposals in a letter he sent to the government minister Von Lindenau and councillor Weissenbach. His ambition was to found a watch manufactory in Saxony. He asked a commission from the government to grant him a business licence in the less economically fortunate region, “Erzgebirge” (Ore Mountains) in Glashütte. Mentions in the letter as follows:

“...Should the high council be able and willing to grand the wherewithal for the establishment of an institution and the welfare of 10-15 young people, and to entrust me with its leadership, I am certain that in a near future, livelihood and prosperity will spread among a large number of these unfortunate people...”

On 7 December 1845, he founded A. Lange & Cie, which later became A. Lange & Söhne in Glashütte. Lange founded not only a watchmaking factory that would bear his name; he also established his vision for an entire industry. Starting with a team of 15 apprentices, to whom he taught the basics of watchmaking. Later on, when they had thoroughly mastered the crafts, he encouraged them to leave his company to start their own small supplier firms. Thus, he established a watchmaking cluster, which provided the region with a new means to make a living.

As Ferdinand Adolph Lange travelled through France he saw French watchmakers still used duodecimal ligne as length unit instead of the new metric system. Accordingly, he recorded detailed calculations for each individual gear-wheel size. Returning from his travels, he started to use the metric system in watchmaking instead of the traditional norm, ligne. Soon after, he built his first micrometer in Dresden from the plans in his journey book. It could measure millimeters to the thousandth. Along with a measurement system, he invented various tools like hand-powered face-lathe to slide-rules and dixieme gauges.

=== Rise to fame ===
In 1868, Ferdinand A. Lange's elder son Richard entered the company, and the company name changed to A. Lange & Söhne (A. Lange & Sons). He had seven children and also took on political responsibility in his home town: He was the mayor of Glashütte for a period of 18 years. After retiring from this position, he was awarded with the honorary citizenship. Additionally, the citizens of Glashütte established the Lange Foundation, which provided pensions for local watchmakers. He died in 1875.

At the time when Emil and Richard Lange joined the company, the name A. Lange & Söhne was already growing and the company needed new premises. In 1873, the company moved to the Stammhaus, which is being used as the company's headquarters today. The new building gave Lange senior the opportunity to realize his idea, a clock with a pendulum of almost 10 meters, the longest in the world. Emil and Richard Lange were complementing each other. While Emil was interested in business, Richard Lange followed his father's path. He advanced his father's inventions and patents such as quarter repeater and chronograph. Some of his notable patents include an up/down power reserve indicator (patent No. 9349), improved chronometer restraints, pocket watch with minutes counter, and addition of beryllium to improve the rate characteristic of balance spring

Emil Lange was awarded the cross of the Knight of the French Legion of Honor for his services as a juror at the Paris world fair and the presentation of the “Jahrhunderttourbillon” (tourbillon of the century). The model was auctioned in 1990 and sold for 1,500,000 Marks. Furthermore, Emil Lange was given the honorary title of “Kommerzienrat” (commercial councilor) by King Frederick Augustus III of Saxony for his success as businessman. In 1898, German Emperor Wilhelm II commissioned A. Lange & Söhne to make a pocket watch that would be presented to Sultan Abdul Hamid II during an official visit of the Ottoman Empire. The watch is in the collection of the Topkapı Palace.

The turn of the 20th century came with a change in fashion. Flat watches for men were increasing in demand. A. Lange & Söhne came up with a new design and registered it in 1898 as “Glashütte caliber” pocket watch. However, in the beginning of the century, in 1904 “Glashütte Präzisons-Uhrenfabrik Akt. Ges.” was founded and then in 1906 “Nomos-Uhr-Gesellschaft” came up. Both companies offered machine-made watches or movements imported from Switzerland and cased up in Glashütte. By contrast, A. Lange & Söhne was still offering hand-made watches and operating with high costs.

=== World Wars I & II ===
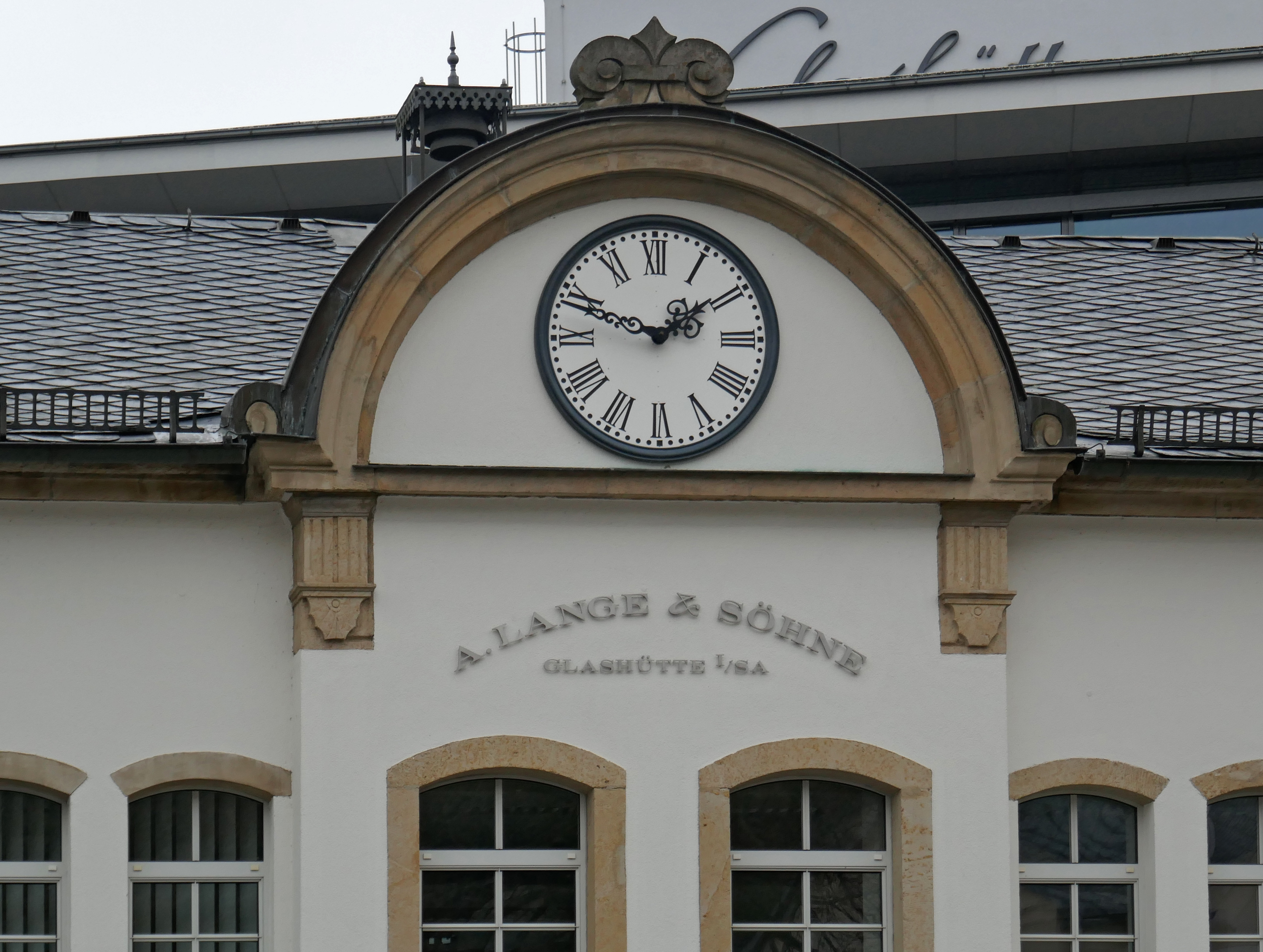
A. Lange & Söhne Stammhaus, Glashütte.

Due to World War I, demand for precious gold watches fell sharply. Many companies had to let go most of their workforce. At the same time, Germany closed its borders to Swiss watches and movements forcing firms dependent on Switzerland out of production. Shortly after the war, German watchmakers founded “Deutsche Präzisions-Uhrenfabrik Glashütte in Sachsen GmbH” (German precision watch factory Glashütte in Saxony), known by its acronym DPUG. The idea was to go to mass production using latest technological machinery. Emil Lange decided not to follow this direction. In 1919, he retired and left the company to his three sons: Otto, Rudolf and Gerhard Lange.

To counter inexpensive production of DPUG, Otto Lange launched a new brand “OLIW” (Original Lange Internationales Werk) and designed a 43mm diameter movement. It was protected in Germany under registered design No. 748 972. It took years to complete the OLIW and serial production did not start until the late 1920s. Between 1921 and 1923, hyperinflation in the Weimar Republic triggered a wave of corporate bankruptcies. Prices ran out of control, for example a loaf of bread, which cost 250 marks in January 1923, had risen to 200,000 million marks in November 1923. At A. Lange & Söhne, sales of OLIW remained behind expectations. In the Glashütte watch industry, most of the workforce was laid off during 1920 and 1930s. Walter Lange describes the situation as follows:

“I was born in the Weimar era; then came the crash in 1929 and the great unemployment. I can still see it today; it was a childhood trauma for me, when I looked out the living room window and saw all the unemployed men lined up, waiting across the street. I will never forget that view.”

Germany's military buildup of the 1930s brought the demand for precision watches back to Glashütte. From the second half of the thirties to the end of World War II, A. Lange & Söhne was one of five watch manufacturers (the others being Stowa, Laco, Wempe and IWC) that built B-Uhren for Germany's air force (Luftwaffe). B-Uhren is an abbreviation of Beobachtungsuhren, literally: observation watches. The total military production amounted to about 13,500 precision watches, equipped with caliber 48 (small seconds) and caliber 48.1 (sweep seconds) with a movement diameter of 48mm.

A. Lange & Söhne, as well as other Glashütte watchmakers, used slave labour to build chronometers, timers, and fuses. During this time Glashütte contained more prisoners than residents; most were women from other European countries.

On 8 May 1945, the last day of the war, the Lange headquarter and main production building was almost completely destroyed in a Soviet air raid. The Glashütte watch companies were nationalized in 1948. At the time, Lange was working on a new movement: Caliber 28, a wristwatch format of the caliber 48. It went into production in 1949 as the last movement developed by A. Lange & Söhne. Watches from this period were signed “Lange VEB” (Volkseigener Betrieb - publicly owned enterprise). When the seized watch companies were merged in 1951 to form VEB Glashütter Uhrenbetriebe, the Lange name disappeared from the dials.

=== Recent development ===
On 7 December 1990, following German reunification, Walter Lange and Günter Blümlein, a watch industry executive, restored the company as Lange Uhren GmbH, with the assistance of several Swiss watch manufacturers, including IWC and Jaeger-LeCoultre. It was re-established on the exact date 145 years after Walter's great-grandfather Ferdinand Adolph Lange founded the original company. The new company re-registered A. Lange & Söhne as its trademark, and was again based in Glashütte. It presented its first range of wristwatches in 1994.

Since 2000, A. Lange & Söhne has been a member of the Richemont group, and only manufactured around five thousand watches every year. In 2017, Walter Lange died at age 92.

== Pronunciation and spelling ==
A. Lange & Söhne is pronounced [aː ˈlaŋə ʊnt ˈzøːnə], approximately "ah LAHNG-eh unt ZUR-neh" (according to non-rhotic English pronunciation). Where the Umlaut "ö" is not available, it is rendered as a digraph by German convention ("Soehne"), but often as "Sohne" internationally (even though that would imply a different pronunciation in German).

== Motto and slogan ==
One of A. Lange & Söhne's company slogans is "State-of-the-art Tradition". In addition, a notable personal motto of Walter Lange is "Never Stand Still".

== Watch manufacturing ==
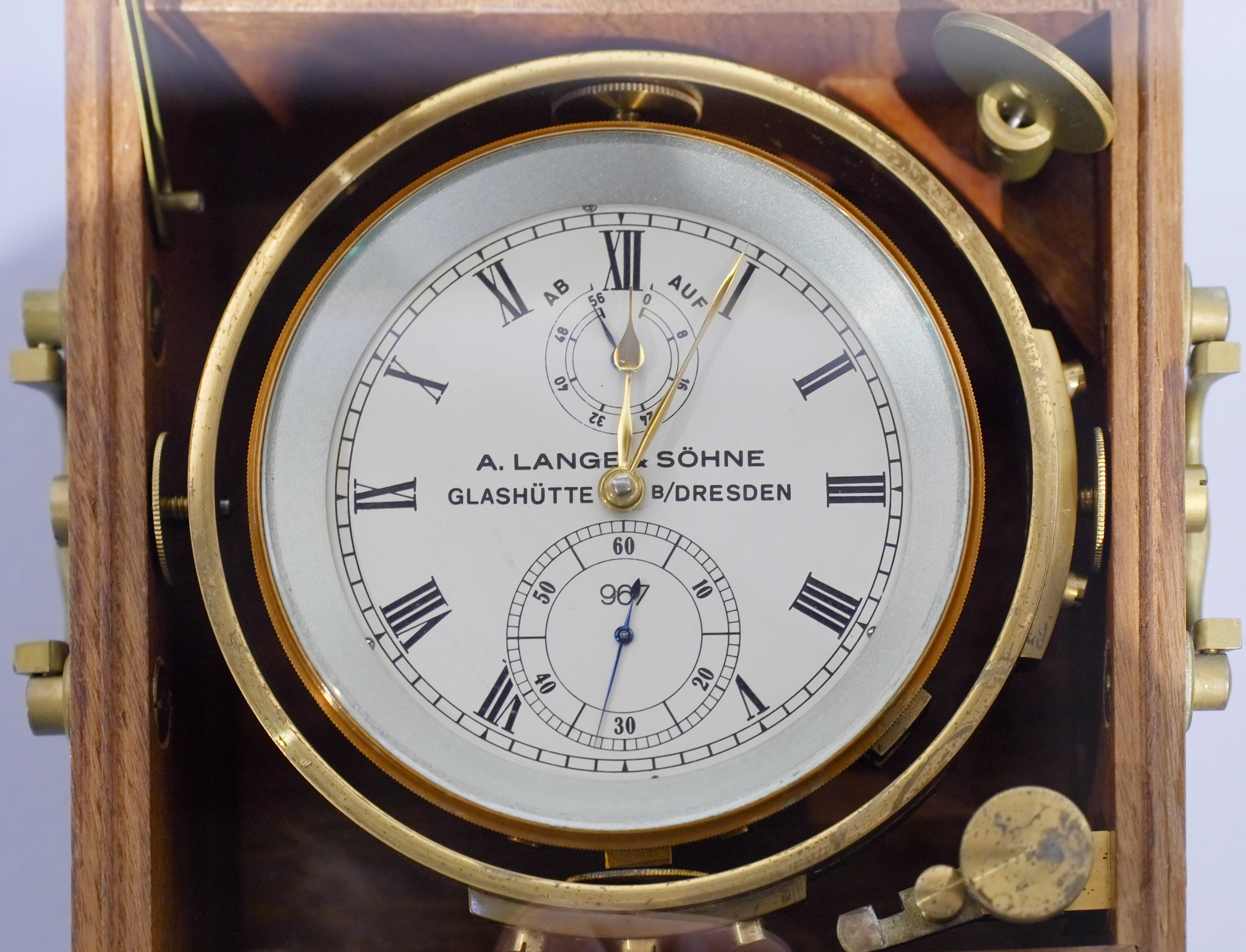
A. Lange & Söhne marine chronometer

All A. Lange & Söhne watches contain mechanical rather than quartz movements, and, with the exception of a very few special edition watches and the Odysseus model, Lange watch cases are made of yellow gold, rose gold, white gold, or platinum. Lange's movements are developed, produced, and assembled by Lange itself. In addition to time-only watches, both manually wound and automatic, Lange is known for its complicated watches, including chronographs and split-seconds chronographs, and perpetual calendars.

=== Design and finishing ===
The design philosophy of A. Lange & Söhne was established in 1990 when the company was re-established, and it draws from heritage. Lange's watches are often described as more "austere" or "Teutonic" in appearance than watches produced by comparable Swiss firms. Case and dial design are straightforward, confident, solid and comforting. Recurrent design elements are the outsize date, inspired by the stage clock of Dresden's Semperoper, solid gold or platinum cases, the shape of the soldered lugs, the galvanized solid-silver dials and the customized typography based on the “Engravers” font from 1899.

The company employs hand-finishing for all their pieces. A. Lange & Söhne applies same level of top hand-finishing on all their pieces from the basic Saxonia to Grand Complication. The hand-engraved balance cock is the brand's signature technique. A. Lange & Söhne uses a multitude of different surface decorations. The most frequent finishing techniques are chamfering, circular graining, contour grinding, engraving, mirror polish, linear finish, perlage, Glashütte ribbing, sunray finish and black polish.

=== Movements ===
Lange's movement design and decoration is distinctively Glashütte in appearance, eschewing typically Swiss features, such as multiple bridges and cocks, or perlage, "Glashütte stripes", hand-engraved balance cocks and screwed gold chatons. The movements are made from a metal known as German silver, as opposed to the plated brass typically used for Swiss movements. It requires extra care and attention of the watchmaker. One wrong move carries the risk of tainting and tarnishing the material.

Each watch movement is designed and made entirely in-house. Since 1994, the brand has developed 63 different movements. Many of the movements feature patented constructions and advancements. The brand is especially known for its chronograph mechanisms. According to Lange's director of product development, Anthony de Haas, it takes four to five years to develop a watch with a new caliber.

The movement numbers are named regarding their development years. For example, L043.1 (Zeitwerk) indicates that work on this particular Lange (L) movement started in 2004 (04), that it is the third project of that year (3) and that it is the first version of this caliber (.1). Prototypes undergo rigorous load tests before going into series production. The testing routine includes a shaking test, a hammer test, which simulates a free fall from a height of one meter onto a hardwood floor, a pusher test, during which each pusher is pressed 50,000 times and a climatic chamber, where the watches are exposed to temperatures from minus 20 degrees to 80 degrees.

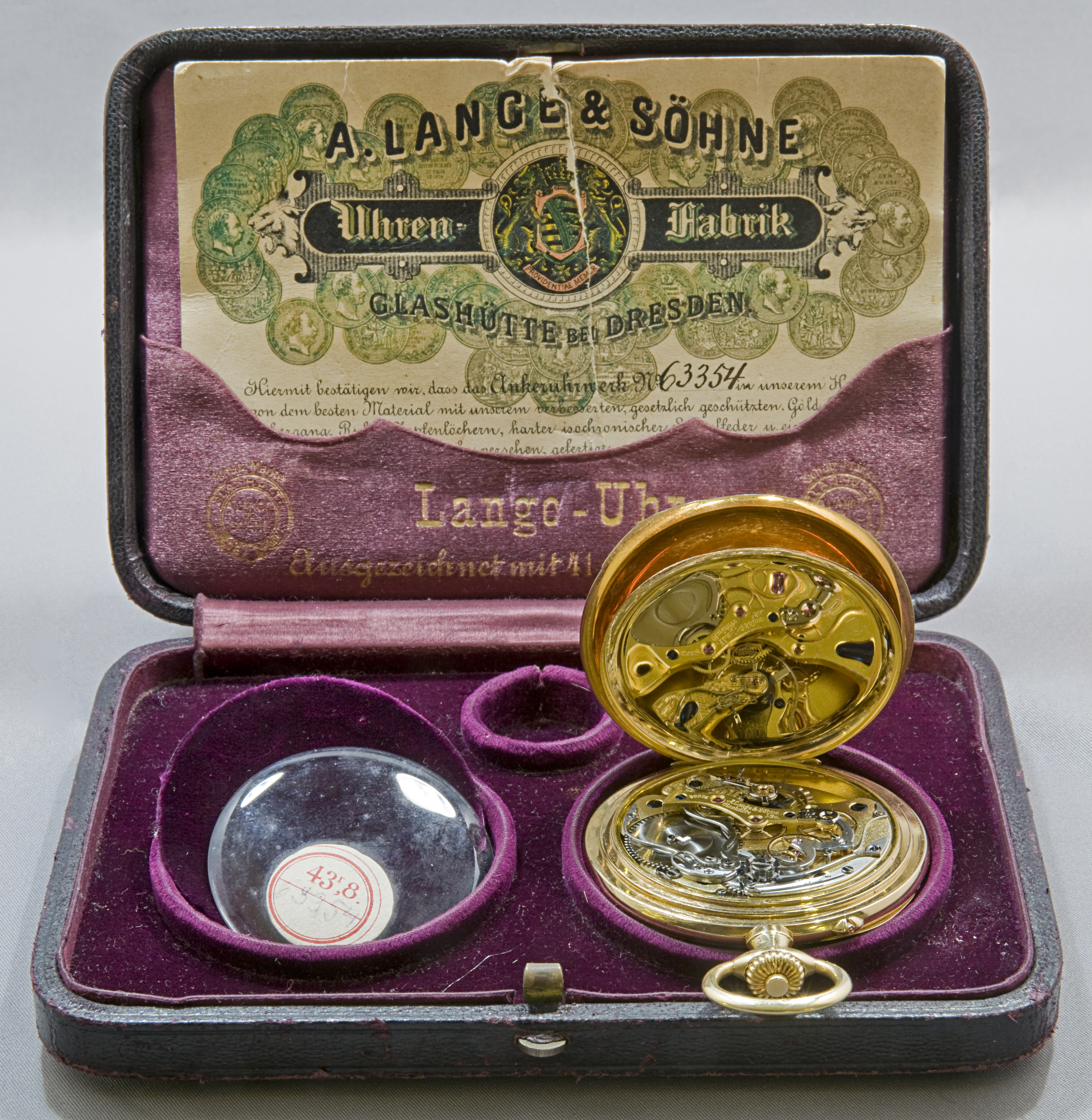
A. Lange & Söhne pocket watch (No. 63354)

=== Notable inventions and patents ===
- 1864, Stable three-quarter plate. In 1864, Ferdinand Adolph Lange introduced the three-quarter plate in his pocket watches. It replaced the many separate bridges which until then held the arbors of the going train. While this requires more time and effort during the assembly phase, it clearly improves the stability of the movement. Only the balance cock with the oscillation system remained exposed, located beneath a cock.
- 1867, Jumping seconds hand. In 1867, Lange developed a jumping-seconds mechanisms for a pocket watch, which his sons Richard and Emil adapted slightly and filed for patent ten years later. Further patents include a keyless winding and hands-setting, a system for the removal of the mainspring barrel, a constant-force escapement, a chronograph, an aluminium balance-spring29 and a quarter repeater.
- 1902, Grand Complication No. 42500. The Grand Complication was made in 1902 as a unique piece. It was sold to Heinrich Schäfer of Vienna for the price of 5600 Marks which at the time was the equivalent of a villa in Dresden, Germany. The watch houses 833 individual parts and features the following complications: chiming mechanism with grand and small strike (grande et petite sonnerie), minute repeater, split-seconds chronograph with minute counter, perpetual calendar with moon phase, flying seconds (seconde foudroyante), and so on. In 2001, the watch came back to Glashütte during a manufacture visit from customers who left it to the hands of the restoration workshop to be repaired. It took a team of five experts and almost seven years to renovate the watch as it was in 1902. In 2010, the restored piece was first exhibited at the Salon International de la Haute Horlogerie (SIHH). The watch is now on permanent loan in the Mathematisch-Physikalischer Salon (Royal Cabinet of Mathematical and Physical Instruments) in Dresden.
- 1931, Richard Lange's balance spring patent. Elinvar balance spring's introduction was revolutionary because it was removing the effects of temperature over the elasticity of the spring. After Emil Lange's introduction of the nickel-steel balance to Germany, Richard Lange's interest in the metallurgical aspect of watchmaking was awoken. He was the first to realise that adding beryllium to nickel and steel lessened the sensitivity of hairsprings to temperature fluctuations and magnetic fields on the one hand, while improving their elasticity and hardness in comparison with the Elinvar alloy springs. His patent application “Metal alloys for watch springs” in Germany and was granted in 1931. His invention created the base of the Nivarox balance springs that are still in use today.
- 1997, Zero reset mechanism. In 1997, A. Lange & Söhne introduced an advanced and elaborate self-winding movement: the Sax-0-Mat calibre features an integrated Zero-Reset mechanism that stops the balance when the crown is pulled and instantaneously moves the seconds hand to the zero position, much like in a chronograph.
- 2005, Disengagement mechanism. With this invention, Lange's split-seconds chronographs – Double Split and Triple Split – can be activated without causing a decline in amplitude. The mechanism prevents friction loss encountered in conventional solutions by separating the interlocking connection between the rattrapante hands and the chronograph hands on the chronograph centre arbor and on the minute counter arbor when the rattrapante button is actuated.
- 2008, Stop-seconds for tourbillon. A. Lange & Söhne is the only brand to find a way to stop the oscillating balance inside the revolving tourbillon cage to allow precise time setting in watches endowed with this complication. Pulling the crown triggers a complex lever ensemble that pivots a movable V-shaped spring into the balance rim. It instantly stops the balance. When the crown is pushed, the “brake” is released, and the balance instantly begins to oscillate again.
- 2018, Triple-split chronograph. In January 2018, Lange introduced the triple-split chronograph, an advancement from Lange's double-split chronograph introduced in 2004. The new chronograph can compare the times of two concurrent events, of up to twelve hours' duration and to the accuracy of one-sixth of a second. Being the world's first mechanical split-seconds chronograph that allows multi-hour comparative time measurements, the watch also features Lange's patented isolator mechanism to preserve the amplitude of the balance wheel while the chronograph is running to ensure precision at all times.

== Notable models ==
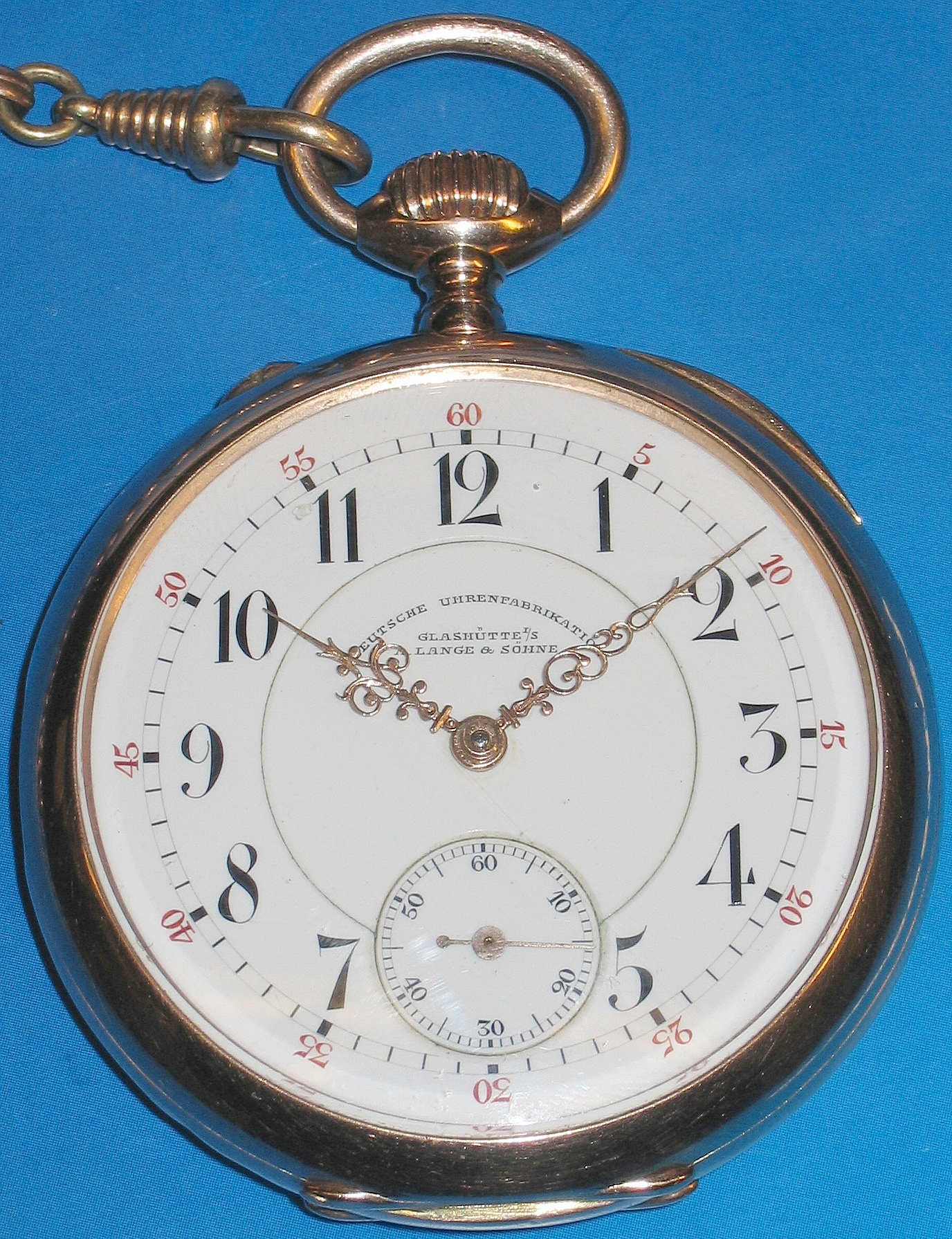
A. Lange & Söhne pocket watch

=== Most expensive pieces ===
- On November 12, 2007, an 18K-pink-gold A. Lange & Söhne pocket watch (No. 46177) manufactured in 1904 was auctioned by Christie's for around 0.95 million US dollars (1,057,000 CHF). The pocket watch contains complications such as minute repeater, perpetual calendar, split-second chronograph, and so on.
- On May 12, 2018, a unique A. Lange & Söhne 1815 "Homage to Walter Lange" made in stainless steel was sold for US$852,525 in Phillips' Geneva auction. This is one of the auction records for Lange timepieces. The proceeds went to Children Action, a Swiss children's relief organization. The watch model was introduced in 2018 to pay tribute to the late Walter Lange. It was limited to 263 pieces in total in the following metals: pink gold (145), white gold (90), yellow gold (27) and steel. Notably, it was the first 1815 model that included a jumping seconds hand, a complication first devised by the founder himself.
- In 2013, Lange introduced the Grand Complication, which boasts multifarious complications including a chiming mechanism with grand and small strike (grande et petite sonnerie), a minute repeater, a split-seconds chronograph with minute counter, and a perpetual calendar with moon phase and flying seconds (seconde foudroyante). Upon release, the piece was the most complicated wristwatch ever made in Germany. The retail price for the watch was US$2.6 million, and only six pieces have been produced. It took about a year for a master watchmaker to assemble the mechanism.

=== 1815 ===
In general, Lange 1815 is a family of wristwatches that pays a tribute to the legacy of Ferdinand Adolph Lange, who was born in the year 1815 and founded the company in 1845. The Lange 1815 family consists of watch models with complications such as chronograph, annual calendar, tourbillon, perpetual calendar and so on. The watches in this line take their roots from Lange pocket watches to the present time by using traditional elements like railway minute track, Arabic numerals and clubs-shaped markers on the 15-minute intervals. Additionally, a couple notable models of the Lange 1815 include the "1815 'Homage to Walter Lange,'" limited in production to just 263 time pieces, and the "1815 Rattrapante Perpetual Calendar in Platinum," winner of the Grande Complication Prize and the Public Prize at the Grand Prix d'Horlogerie de Geneve.

=== Zeitwerk ===
Introduced in 2009, the Zeitwerk is the first mechanical watch that displays the time from left to right in a digital looking manner. Its designers had challenged everything, except mechanical principles, to come up with a patented mechanism that drove three precisely switching hour and minute discs. In November 2009, it was awarded the “Aigulle d’Or” at the Grand Prix d’Horlogerie de Genève. Encouraged by the success, the watch was turned into a family of its own. The Zeitwerk range includes several watches with striking complications as well as a model featuring a ring-shaped date display.

=== Lange 1 ===
The Lange 1 is one of the first watch models introduced after A. Lange & Söhne trademark was re-established in 1990s. It is a family of watches that boasts a unique decentralized and asymmetrical dial design, as well as the outsize date display. Specifically, the "Lange 1" model features an asymmetric layout with no overlap among its key indicators: a dial displaying the hours and minutes, a smaller subsidiary dial displaying seconds, an oversized double window date display, and a power reserve indicator. The Lange 1 family is often regarded as one of the most iconic watch designs and has won 45 prizes since 1995.

At the Salon International de la Haute Horlogerie (SIHH) 2012 in Geneva, A. Lange & Söhne unveiled new watches including a take on the classic Lange 1. The Lange 1 watch family is to be headed by the Lange 1 Tourbillon Perpetual Calendar, with two large complications and a new type of instantaneously jumping month ring. The company also issued a reworked Grand Lange 1. In addition, there was a luminous Lange 1 Time Zone in white gold. Over the years, the Lange 1 has been evolved into a watch family composed of 15 models. They come in various case diameters and as manually wound or self-winding versions. The portfolio has been enriched with additional functions such as a moon-phase displays that are designed to remain accurate for 122.6 years, a second time zone, or as a combination featuring a tourbillon and a perpetual calendar (Lange 1 Perpetual Calendar Tourbillon). In 2019, the brand celebrated the Lange 1's 25th anniversary with a series of limited editions.

== Notable patrons and owners ==
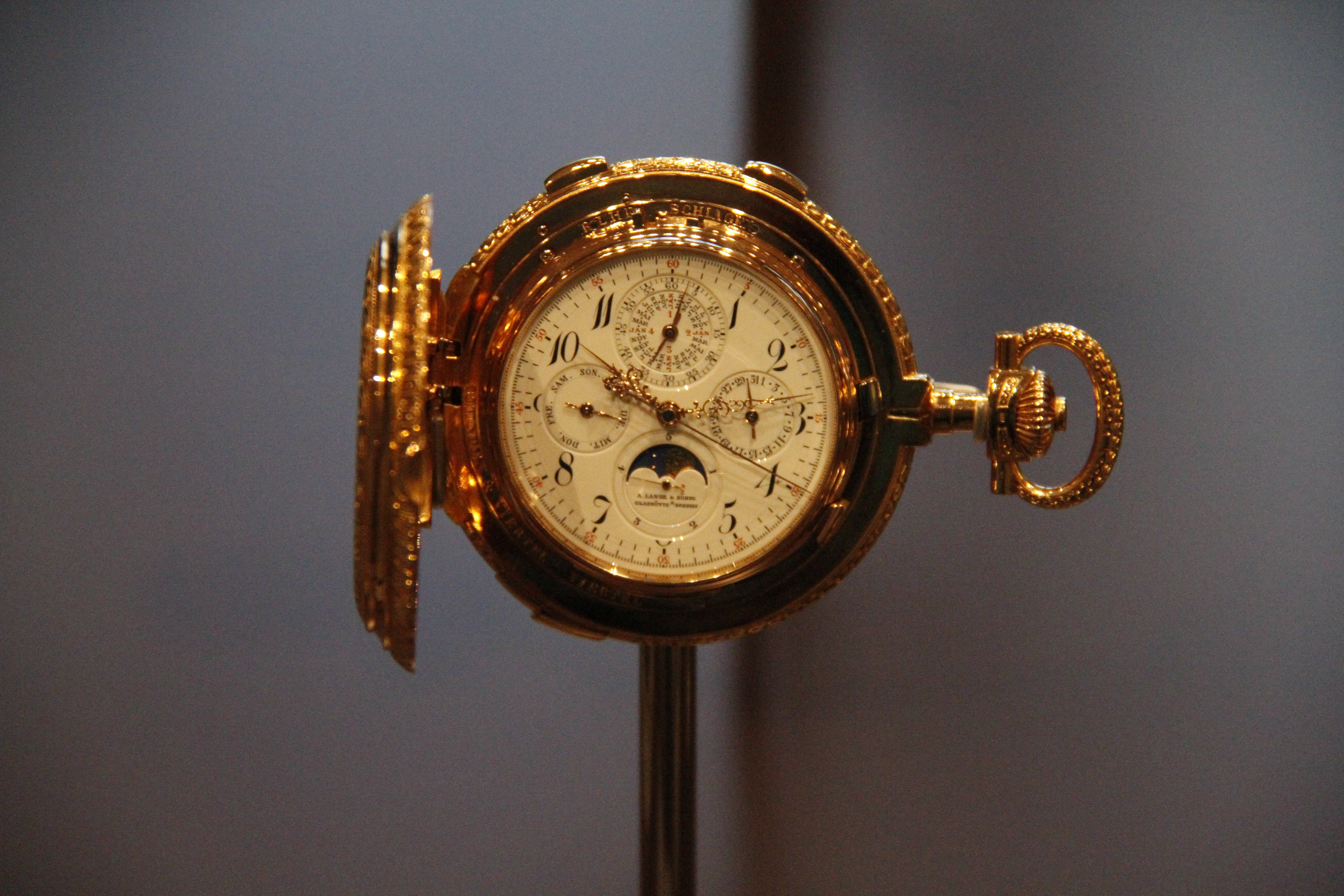
A. Lange & Söhne pocket watch No. 42500 (1902). With 833 components, it is possibly the most complicated watch ever manufactured by the company.

=== Athletes ===
- Michael Jordan, American basketball player

=== Celebrities ===
- Brad Pitt, American actor
- Ed Sheeran, English singer

=== Politicians ===
- Vladimir Putin, President of Russia
- Bill Clinton, 42nd President of the United States

=== Royalty ===
- Alexander II of Russia, Tsar of Russia
- Abdul Hamid II, 34th Sultan (Emperor) of the Ottoman Empire. The pocket watch was commissioned by German Emperor Wilhelm II as a gift to Sultan Abdul Hamid II during Emperor Wilhelm II's official tour of the Ottoman Empire.

== See also ==
- List of watch manufacturers
- List of German watch manufacturers
- Manufacture d'horlogerie
