= Laco Uhrenmanufaktur =

German watchmaker

Laco Uhrenmanufaktur GmbH (Lacher & Co.)
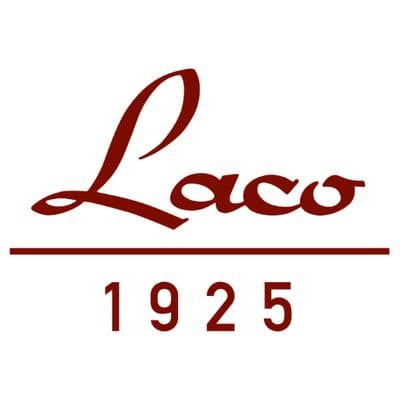
- Industry: Watch manufacturing
- Founded: 1925
- Founder: Frieda Lacher, Ludwig Hummel
- Headquarters: Pforzheim, Germany
- Products: Wristwatches, accessories
- Owner: LACO GmbH
- Website: www.laco.de/en

Laco Uhrenmanufaktur GmbH (formerly Lacher & Co) is a German watch manufacturer founded in 1925 in Pforzheim by Frieda Lacher and Ludwig Hummel.

== History ==
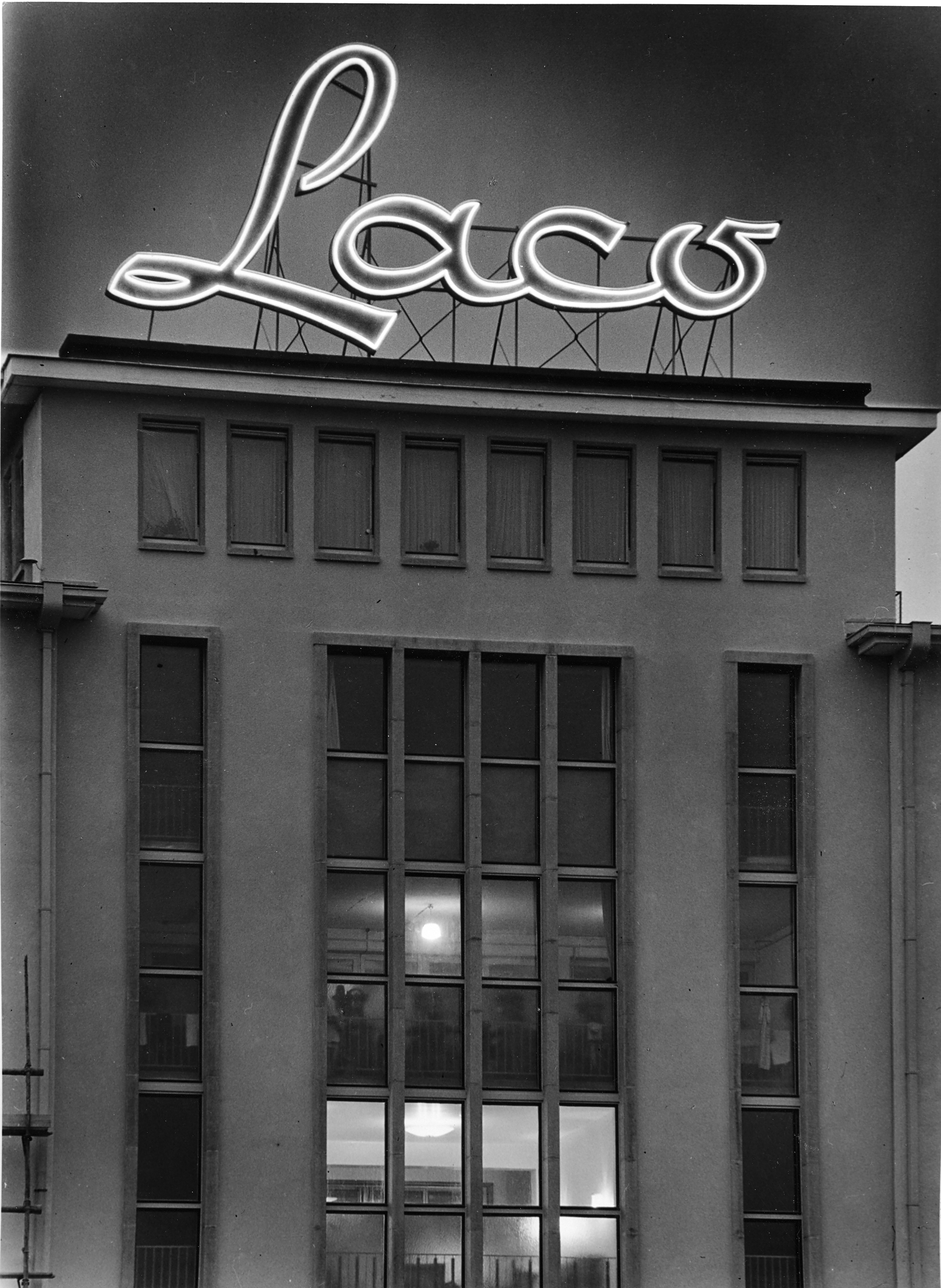
Laco Uhrenmanufaktur

The company name derives from the surname Lacher and the abbreviation "Co". Laco Uhrenmanufaktur was founded during the 1920s, when Swiss movements were widely used in the watch industry in Pforzheim. After several years, the founders separated their business activities. Ludwig Hummel remained with Laco, while Frieda Lacher moved into the production of precision parts for wristwatches.

In 1933, Hummel founded Durowe (Deutsche Uhren Roh Werke), also based in Pforzheim. The company aimed to reduce dependence on Swiss suppliers by manufacturing its own watch movements. In 1936, Erich Lacher joined the company and assumed management responsibilities. The company subsequently resumed the production of complete watches.

The company expanded until World War II. Monthly production of movements increased from approximately 20,000 to 30,000 units. Durowe also supplied raw movements to other watch manufacturers. Its product range included both round and non-round mechanical movements.

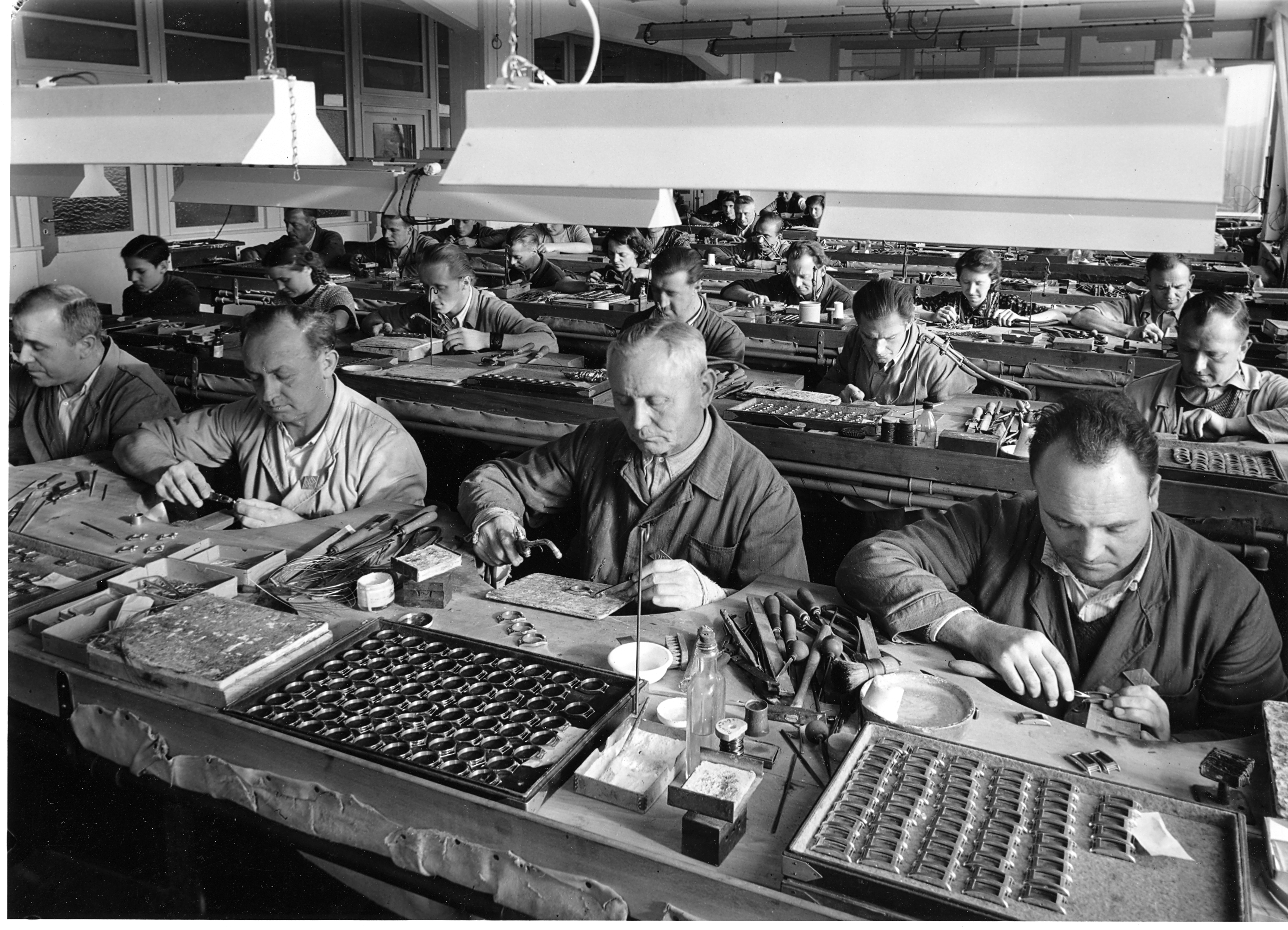
Work at the Laco Uhrenmanufaktur

Following the destruction of much of Pforzheim during Allied air raids, Laco and Durowe resumed operations in 1949. Through support associated with the Marshall Plan, a new factory complex was constructed and later expanded. Manual-winding and automatic movements manufactured by Durowe contributed to the company's post-war growth. Automatic movements had been produced since 1952. By the mid-1950s, the factory employed around 1,400 workers.

The Laco Sport model included the first automatic movement produced by Durowe beginning in 1952: the Duromat cal. 552. In 1957, Laco developed the manually wound chronometer movement cal. 630. On 1 February 1959, Ludwig Hummel sold the company to Timex Group USA. The company later developed electric watch technology, and the Laco-electric entered the market in 1961.

In 1965, Timex sold Laco-Durowe to the Swiss company Ebauches S.A.. Durowe continued producing mechanical movements during the following decade. Production declined during the 1970s following increased competition from quartz watches manufactured in Japan. During the 1980s, the Laco brand name was reintroduced. On 8 September 1988, executive manager Horst Günther acquired the rights to the Laco name and logo.

In 2000, the company released a limited edition series of pilot watches based on 1940s-era designs. In 2003, Laco introduced an updated pilot watch series using mechanical movements and decorative finishing techniques such as Geneva stripes. Laco declared insolvency on 30 June 2009. After a brief period under Kienzle Uhren, the company was restructured in 2010 with eight employees. Since then, the company has focused primarily on pilot watch models.

== Historical link to B-Watches (B-Uhren watches) ==
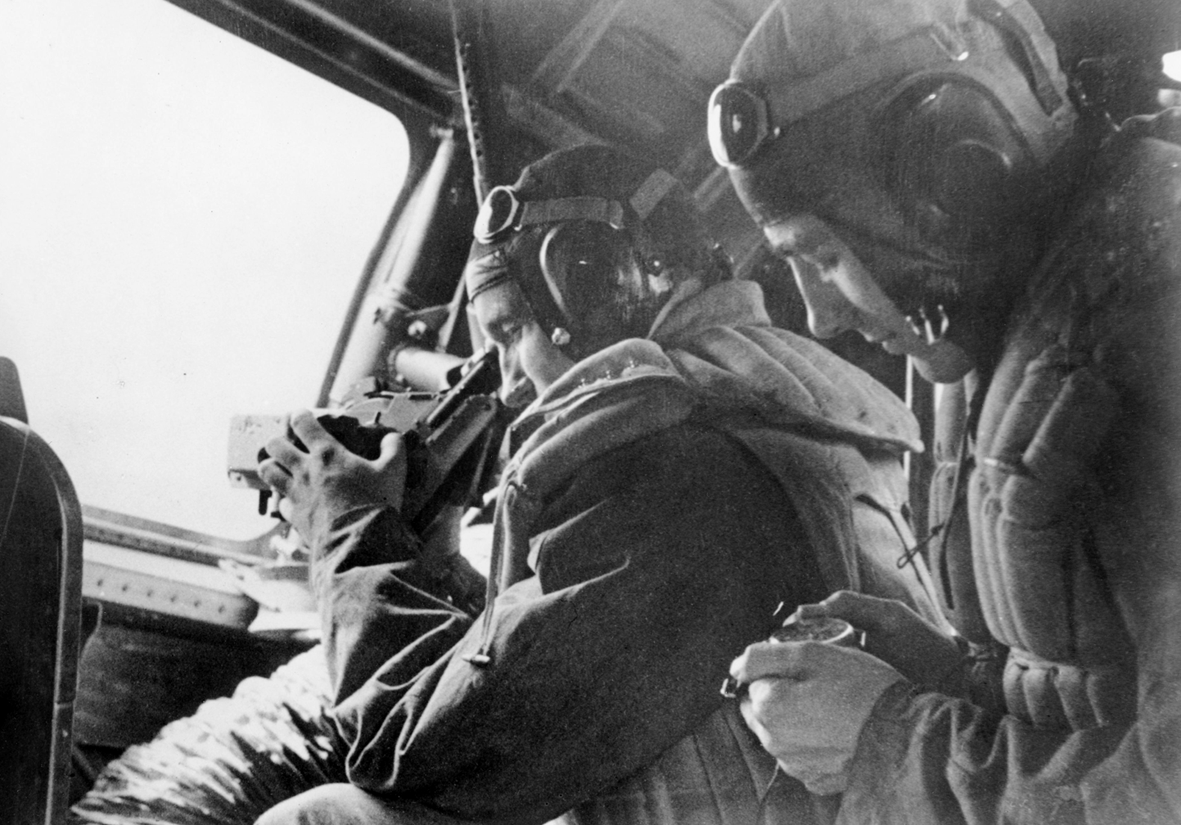
Pilots with pilot watches of Laco

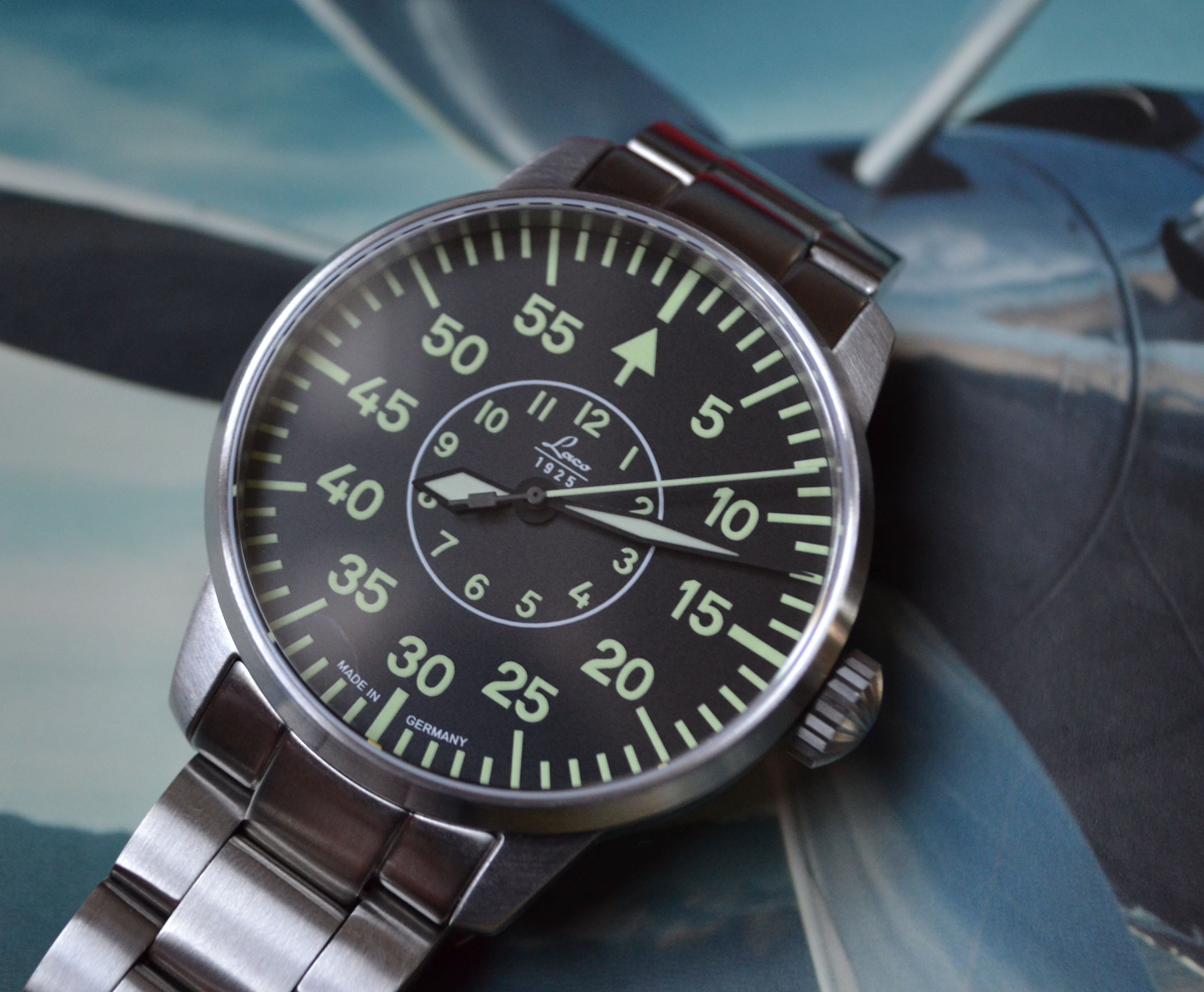
Laco Faro

During World War II, observation watches known as B-Uhren were produced for the German Luftwaffe. Five manufacturers produced these watches:

- Lange & Söhne
- Laco (Lacher & Co)
- Stowa (Walter Storz)
- Wempe (Chronometerwerke Hamburg)
- IWC

The watches used pocket watch movements and were manufactured according to specifications defined by the Reichsluftfahrtministerium (RLM).

== See also ==
- List of watch manufacturers
- List of German watch manufacturers
- Manufacture d'horlogerie

== Literature ==
- Michael Brückner: Auf SpUHRENsuche. Zu Besuch in innovativen Manufakturen und Ateliers. 1. Auflage. Pro Business, Berlin 2010, ISBN 978-3-86805-804-8.
- Fritz von Osterhausen: Callweys Uhrenlexikon. Callwey, München 1999, ISBN 3-7667-1353-1.
- Wolfgang Pieper: Geschichte der Pforzheimer Uhrenindustrie. Verlag Dr. Klaus Piepenstock, Baden-Baden 1992.
