= Lang & Heyne =

- Industry: Watches
- Founded: 2001
- Founders: Mirko Heyne; Marco Lang
- Headquarters: Dresden, Germany
- Key people: Dr.-Ing Daniel T. Roy (CEO); Alexander Gutierrez Diaz (CCO)
- Products: Watches and timepieces
- Number of employees: 35
- Website: www.lang-und-heyne.de

Lang & Heyne is a manufacturer of luxury wristwatches based in Dresden, Germany.

== History ==
Lang & Heyne was founded in Dresden in 2001 by Marco Lang and Mirko Heyne. Heyne left the company in 2002 and later joined Nomos Glashütte. Marco Lang continued to lead the company and, in 2005, became a member of the Académie Horlogère des Créateurs Indépendants.

Marco Lang later sold a majority stake in Lang & Heyne to Prof. Dr. Ulrich L. Rohde, whom Phillips described as the son of one of the co-founders of Rohde & Schwarz. In 2013, Lang and Rohde, together with two other shareholders, founded the Tempus Arte Group; Lang contributed the Lang & Heyne manufacture to the group, while Uhren-Werke-Dresden was established as a subsidiary movement manufacturer.

Lang headed Lang & Heyne until 2018 and left the company in 2019 to establish a new watchmaking workshop under his own name. The transition was supported by Jens Schneider, who had previously worked with Lang & Heyne as a consultant and later became the company's director of development.

Lang & Heyne is part of the Tempus Arte Group, which also includes STOWA and Uhren-Werke-Dresden. Since 1 July 2025, Dr.-Ing. Daniel T. Roy has served as CEO of the Tempus Arte Group, forming its management together with Alexander Gutierrez-Diaz.

== Models ==
Current models as of 2015 include Augustus, Köning Johann, and Friedrich August I. The names are all chosen from the Fürstenzug, a large 19th-century mural in Dresden depicting rulers of Saxony, which Lang personally visits on completion of each design.

== Watches ==
Lang & Heyne produces mechanical wristwatches. The company's model names often refer to historical rulers of Saxony, a naming practice associated with the Fürstenzug in Dresden, a mural depicting Saxon rulers.

One of the company's best-known models is the Georg, introduced in 2017 as Lang & Heyne's first rectangular wristwatch. It is named after George, Duke of Saxony, also known as George the Bearded. The model uses the manually wound Caliber VIII and has been described by Phillips as arguably the most popular wristwatch in the company's more traditional line.

Other models have included Friedrich August, König Johann, Moritz, Anton and Hektor.

== See also ==
- List of German watch manufacturers
