= Sinn (disambiguation) =

Sinn refers to the German word Sinn (sense), frequently contrasted with Bedeutung (indication, reference) in discussions of meaning.

Sinn may also refer to:

- Sinn (river), a river in Germany
- Sinn, Hesse, a community in Germany
- Sinn (watchmaker), a German watchmaker
- Sinn (comics), a character from the Spawn comics
- Sinn, a character on the animated television series Frisky Dingo
- Nickname of the professional wrestler Nick Cvjetkovich
- Sinn Sisamouth, a Khmer singer and songwriter in the 1950s to the 1970s
