= Thomas Sabo =

Jewellery manufacturer in Germany

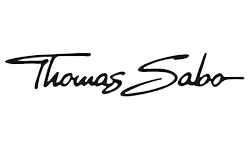

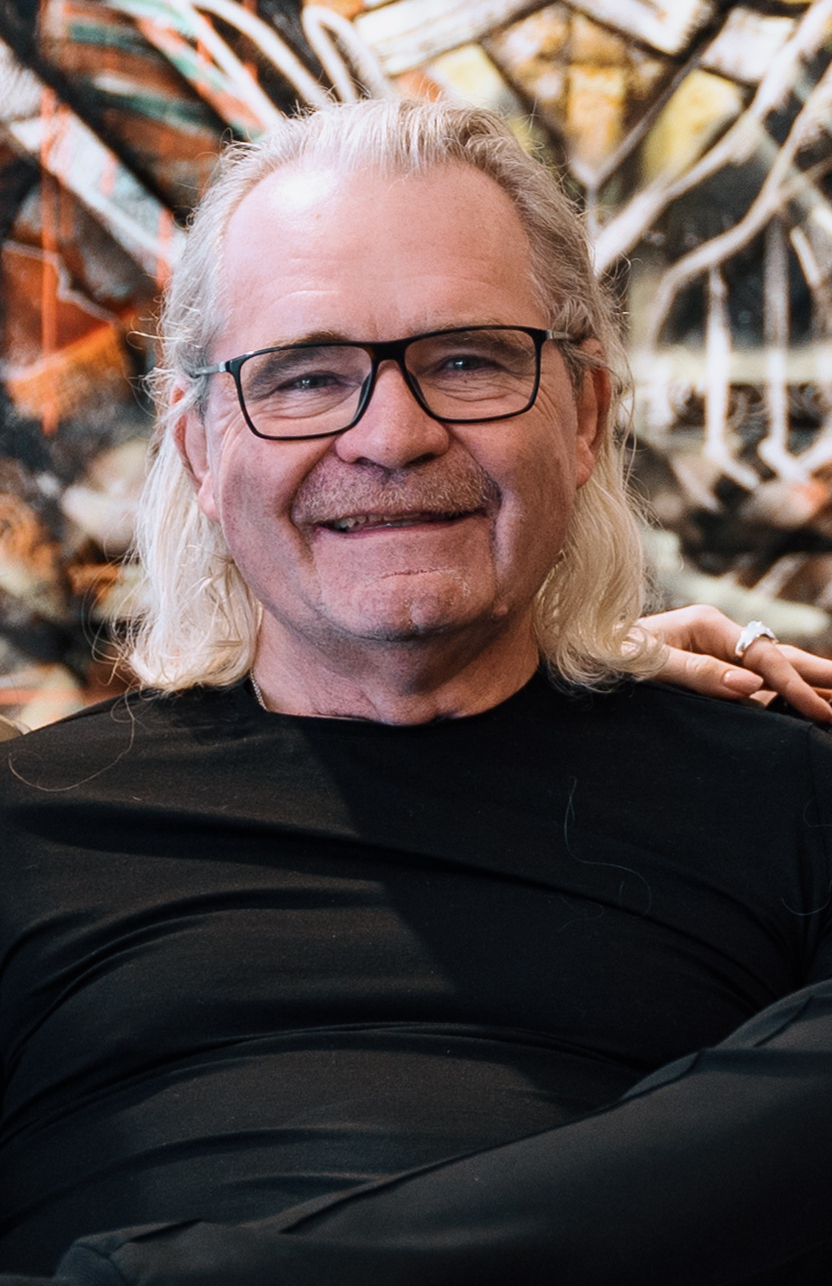
- Type: Private
- Industry: Jewellery Manufacturing; Watchmaking
- Founded: 1984
- Founder: Thomas Sabo
- Headquarters: Lauf an der Pegnitz, Germany
- Key people: Thomas Sabo, (Chairman, managing director); Gunnar Binder, (Managing director)
- Products: Jewellery, watches
- Number of employees: 1,860 (2016)
- Website: www.thomassabo.com

Thomas Sabo GmbH & Co. KG is a German manufacturer of jewellery and watches.

== History ==
The company was founded in 1984 in Lauf an der Pegnitz, Germany by Thomas Sabo.

Thomas Sabo engages in designing, manufacturing, and distributing jewellery and watches.

== Operation ==
The company employs around 500 people at its main site in Lauf a. d. Pegnitz. The head office houses, among other things, the management, administration, marketing, sales for specialist and retail trade, as well as a workshop and customer service.

Internationally, the company has over 1800 employees. The corporate structure includes TS Unternehmens- und Beteiligungs GmbH (asset management and real estate business) as well as several foreign companies.

== See also ==
- Thomas Sabo Ice Tigers
- MeisterSinger (watchmaker)
