= List of German watch manufacturers =

This is a list of watch manufacturers based in Germany. Note that manufacturers that are named after the founder are sorted by surname

Entries with an article should also be suitable for inclusion in Category:Watch manufacturing companies of Germany. Entries which do not yet have an article may be removed if not justified for inclusion with a reliable, independent source and inline citation.

== A ==
- Archimede

== B ==
- Jochen Benzinger
- Bethge & Söhne
- Botta Design
- Rainer Brand
- Martin Braun

== D ==
- Damasko
- Dievas
- D. Dornblüth & Sohn
- Dugena

== G ==
- Glashütte Original
- Grieb & Benzinger
- Guinand

== H ==
- Hanhart
- Hentschel Hamburg

== J ==
- Junghans

== K ==
- Kienzle Uhren
- Kudoke

== L ==
- Laco
- Lang & Heyne
- A. Lange & Söhne
- Lilienthal
- Limes

== M ==
- Daniel Malchert
- MeisterSinger
- Montblanc
- Moritz Grossmann
- Mühle Glashütte

== N ==
- Thomas Ninchritz
- NOMOS Glashütte

== S ==
- Schäuble & Söhne
- Sternglas
- Jörg Schauer
- Schaumburg
- Alexander Shorokhoff
- Sinn
- Bruno Söhnle
- Stowa

== T ==
- Temption
- Tourby
- Tutima

== U ==
- Union Glashütte
- UTS München

== W ==
- Wempe

== See also ==
- Glashütte
- List of watch manufacturers
- List of Swiss watch manufacturers
