= Manufacture d'horlogerie =

Maker of watch movements

Manufacture d'horlogerie (meaning "watchmaking manufacturer") is a French language term of horology that has also been adopted in the English language as a loanword. In horology, the term is usually encountered in its abbreviated form manufacture. This term is used when describing a wrist watch movement or watchworks fabricator which makes all or most of the parts required for its products in its own production facilities, as opposed to simply assembling watches using parts purchased from other firms.

== Definition ==
The Dictionnaire professionnel illustré de l'horlogerie (The Illustrated Professional Dictionary of the Watchmaking Industry) defines manufacture as follows:

In the Swiss watch industry the term manufacture is used of a factory in which watches are manufactured almost completely, as distinct from an atelier de terminage, which is concerned only with assembling, timing, fitting the hands and casing.

The concept of manufacture in the Swiss watch making industry refers to any firm that at least designs calibres, produces the movements parts thereof called ébauches, and assembles them into watches. For example, a company that does not manufacture crystals (the watch glass) or hairsprings may still be regarded as a manufacture.

== Examples ==
The following companies produce whole watches, including cases and movements:

- A. Lange & Söhne
- Aquastar (watch brand)
- Audemars Piguet
- Baume et Mercier
- Bianchet
- Blancpain
- Breguet
- Breitling SA
- Bvlgari
- Cartier (some models)
- Chopard
- Citizen Watch
- Damasko (some models)
- Frédérique Constant (some models)
- F. P. Journe
- Gallet & Co.
- Girard-Perregaux
- Glashutte Original
- Moritz Grossman
- H. Moser & Cie
- Hamilton
- Hublot
- IWC
- Jaeger-LeCoultre
- Jaquet Droz
- Lang & Heyne
- Maurice Lacroix
- Nomos
- Omega SA
- Orient
- Oris
- Panerai
- Parmigiani Fleurier
- Patek Philippe
- Piaget SA
- Roger Dubuis
- Rolex
- Seagull
- Seiko
- The Swatch Group
- Tudor
- Ulysse Nardin
- Universal Genève
- Vacheron Constantin
- Vostok
- Vulcain Watches
- Zenith

== See also ==
- Ébauche
- ETA SA
- Federation of the Swiss Watch Industry
- List of watch manufacturers
