= Barbing =

- Municipality
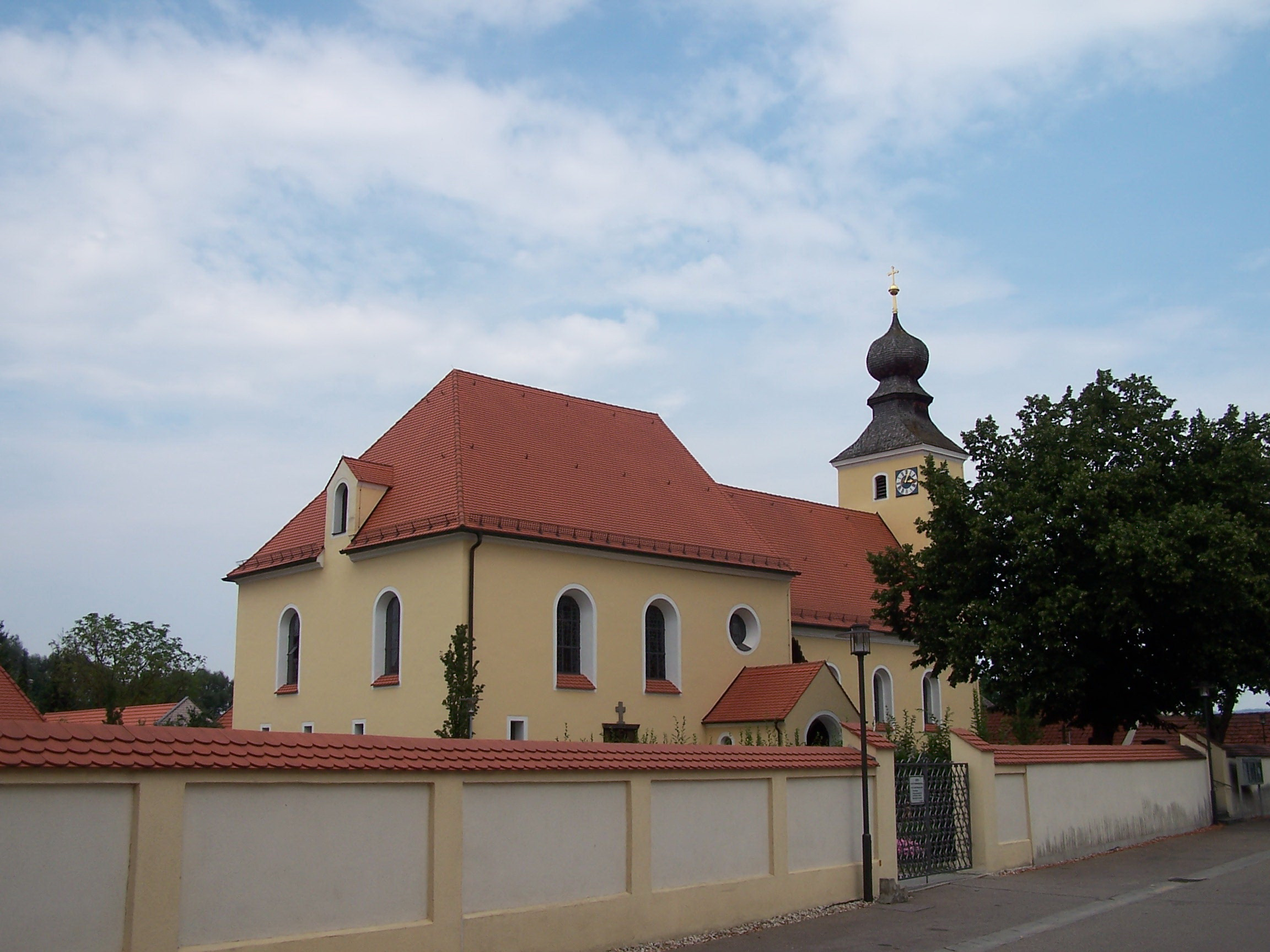
- Church of Saint Martin

- Coat of arms

- Location of Barbing within Regensburg district
- Interactive map of Barbing
- Location within Germany Location within Bavaria
- Coordinates: 49°00′12″N 12°11′57″E
- Country: Germany
- State: Bavaria
- Admin. region: Oberpfalz
- District: Regensburg
- Subdivisions: 8 Ortsteile

Government
  - Mayor (2020–26): Johann Thiel (CSU)

Area
  - Total: 30.51 km^{2} (11.78 sq mi)
- Elevation: 332 m (1,089 ft)

Population (2025-12-31)
  - Total: 5,926
  - Density: 194.2/km^{2} (503.1/sq mi)
- Time zone: UTC+01:00 (CET)
  - Summer (DST): UTC+02:00 (CEST)
- Postal codes: 93092
- Dialling codes: 09401, 09403 (Sarching, Friesheim), 09481 (Illkofen, Auburg, Altach, Eltheim)
- Vehicle registration: R
- Website: www.barbing.de

Barbing is a municipality in the district of Regensburg in Bavaria in Germany. It lies on the Danube river.

The town is home to the luxury watchmaker, Damasko.

== Subdivisions ==
Barbing has eleven Ortsteile:

- Altach
- Auburg
- Auhof
- Barbing
- Eltheim
- Friesheim
- Illkofen
- Mooshof
- Naßenhart
- Sarching
- Unterheising
