= Lilienthal Berlin =

German watch manufacturer

- Industry: Watches
- Founded: 2015; 11 years ago in Berlin, Germany
- Founder: Jacques Colman and Michael Gilli
- Website: lilienthal-berlin.com

Lilienthal Berlin is a watch manufacturer based in the capital of Berlin, Germany

== History ==
Lilienthal Berlin was founded in 2015 by Jacques Colman and Michael Gilli. The company name refers to the German aviation pioneer Otto Lilienthal. The Lilienthal watches are inspired by the Bauhaus design.

In 2018 Lilienthal Berlin was awarded the German Design Award, and in 2021 the iF Design Award. In 2017, Lilienthal received the Green Product Award for sustainability. Lilienthal Berlin received the German design award in 2019 and 2020, as well as the Red Dot Design Award in 2019.
