= Stowa =

Watch manufacturer in Pforzheim, Baden-Württemberg, Germany

STOWA
- Type: Privately held company
- Industry: Watch manufacturing
- Founded: 1927 by Walter Storz
- Headquarters: Pforzheim, Germany
- Key people: Daniel Roy (CEO) & Alexander Gutierrez-Diaz (CCO)
- Products: Wristwatches, accessories
- Website: www.stowa.de

STOWA is a German luxury watchmaker founded by Walter Storz in 1927, and is based in Pforzheim, Germany. The name is a portmanteau of the founder's name, Storz Walter. From 1996 until 2021, STOWA was owned by Jörg Schauer. On July 1, 2021, Stowa became part of Tempus Arte GmbH & Co. KG, which also owns Uhrenmanufaktur Lang & Heyne Dresden and UhrenWerke-Dresden (UWD).

== Timeline ==
1927: Founding of STOWA by Walter Storz in Hornberg/Kinzigtal, Germany. The name derives from "STO," for Storz and "WA," for Walter.

1935: Moved to a new rented building in Pforzheim, Germany.

1938: Construction of STOWA owned building at Bismarckstraße 54 in Pforzheim, Germany.

1938: Presentation of Bauhaus watches (on which today's Antea line is based).

1939: Production launch of STOWA Marine Beobachtungsuhr ("Observation Watch") and the big pilot B-watches (55mm), (commissioned by the Luftwaffe in World War II). Both basic designs can be found in several variations within the current line. STOWA was one of only five manufacturers for these watches (the others being A. Lange & Söhne, Laco, Wempe and IWC).

1945: On February 23, 1945, the STOWA building is destroyed by the Allies' bombardment of Pforzheim.

1945: Start of STOWA's new watch factory in Rheinfelden, Baden-Württemberg, Germany, near Basel, Switzerland.

1947: Walter Storz becomes founding member of the Watch Industry Association.

1951: Construction of STOWA's new factory in Rheinfelden is completed. The headquarters office in Pforzheim is rebuilt in parallel.

1954: Foundation of the RUFA (Rheinfelder Uhrteilefabrik). Leads to production of RUFA-Anti-Shocks for PUW and DUROWE movements. The Rheinfelden factory is expanded.

1960: Werner Storz, son of Walter Storz, joins the company and is in charge of sales overseas.

1963: Protection of trademarks for STOWA Seatime is established (prototype for present-day Prodiver collection).

1966: The Rheinfelden factory is expanded further.

1970: STOWA launches the "smallest alarm clock of the world" at the Hannover watch fair. The watch collection comprises approximately 1,000 different watch models.

1974: Walter Storz dies. STOWA becomes partner and member of the German watch cooperation Pallas, which has the primary goal of supplying specialized dealers and retailers with a collection of market-conform and trend-setting watches, concentrated advertising, and the highest level of customer service.

1996: Jörg Schauer takes over STOWA and all trademark rights from Werner Storz.

1997: STOWA's 70th anniversary. A limited edition Fliegeruhr ("Pilot Watch") with Unitas 6300N movement is introduced.

1998: Werner Storz dies.

2002: The 75th anniversary of STOWA as a company. A limited edition Fliegeruhr "Bremen D 1167" is offered in celebration of the anniversary. This limited edition is a tribute to the airplane called "Bremen," the first airplane to make a nonstop flight across Atlantic Ocean from East to West in 1928.

2007: STOWA's 80th anniversary. Introduction of two limited edition pilot's watches: Flieger Automatic and Flieger Original.

2008/2009: Move to a new production building, which also houses a STOWA in-house museum with several historic watches produced by STOWA.

2010: Introduction of the STOWA Chronograph, which is based on a former pocket watch design. Launch of the Flieger Baumuster B with B-Dial. (Only 42 pieces of the original 55mm Pilot B-Dial watch have been produced during WW2, making the original Pilot B-Uhr is one of the rarest big pilot watches ever.)

2021: Stowa became part of Tempus Arte GmbH & Co. KG.

2022: STOWA celebrates its 95th anniversary.

2023: The brand receives a complete makeover in the form of a brand relaunch in the year following its 95th anniversary. The company is moving back to Pforzheim “back to the roots”, where the company has spent most of its history.

2024: STOWA releases the first in-house manufacture movement M1.

2026: STOWA engages in a new partnership with the FIA World Rally Championship (WRC). For the coming WRC seasons, STOWA will act as Official WRC Time Keeper & Watch Partner of the FIA World Rally Championship, supporting one of the most prestigious motorsport series in the world.

== Watch models ==
As of 2020, STOWA has had several model lines:

- Antea: Replica of an original STOWA design from the 1930s.
- Antea back to bauhaus: Refreshed bauhaus design, in collaboration with designer Hartmut Esslinger, introduced in 2014.
- Chronograph: Chronograph models based on historic pocket watch designs.
- Flieger (Pilot): Homage to the original Beobachtungsuhren (B-Uhr) design.
- Flieger Verus: Contemporary pilot watch designs.
- Marine: Based on the marine chronometers used in navigation.
- Partitio: a Bauhaus design inspired watch, replicated from a 1930s STOWA design.
- Prodiver: Sports diving watches that are water resistant to 1000m. The dial and hand design of these are inspired by vintage STOWA Seatimes.
- Fieldwatch: a military design inspired tool watch.

The movements in STOWA's watches are Sellita and ETA movements with significant decoration and, in the case of their own M1 caliber, mechanical modifications.

== Distribution ==
Since around 2001/02, STOWA has sold the majority of its watches directly to the customer, through its website or from its manufactory in Pforzheim. This direct-to-consumer approach minimizes distribution overhead, enabling STOWA to offer high-quality watches at more competitive prices than traditional wholesale and retail models.

== See also ==
- List of German watch manufacturers
