= Temption =

Watch manufacturer in Herrenberg, Baden-Württemberg, Germany

Temption GmbH
- Industry: Watches
- Founded: 1996
- Founder: Klaus Ulbrich
- Headquarters: Herrenberg, Germany
- Products: Watches and timepieces
- Owner: Klaus Ulbrich
- Website: www.temption-watches.de/en/start_en.html

Temption GmbH is a manufacturer of mechanical wristwatches. The company is based in Herrenberg, Germany.

== History ==
Klaus Ulbrich founded the company in 1996, in Herrenberg, in Baden-Württemberg, near Stuttgart, after a career in other industries. He studied mechanical engineering at the Ingenierschule fur Feinwerktechnik Furtwangen (engineering school for precision engineering) in Furtwagen, Germany, now Hochschule Furtwangen University. This school included watch and clock engineering as a specialty study. The school also houses an internationally known watch and clock museum that is devoted to the history of timekeeping devices.

The brand made its first appearance at Baselworld in 1998 with three models: CM03, CG103, and CGK203.

== Design ==
Mr. Ulbrich wanted to base his designs on schools of wabi-sabi, the Japanese art of finding beauty in imperfection and modesty, and Bauhaus, the German school of design founded in 1919, which sought to blend the distinction between the fine arts and applied arts.

This philosophy resulted in six design principles that are applied to Temption timepieces:

- Simplicity
- Less is more
- Form follows function
- Simple dials, easy to read, ergonomic, and the date window is always the color of the dial
- High contrast between the hands and the dial
- Hidden logo, to not spoil the ergonomics of the dial.

Temption has traditionally used Swiss ETA movements as the basis for the movements in their watches, but now offers some models with Soprod movements. Several Temption model come with inlaid cabochons on the crown and the chronograph pushbuttons.

== Models ==
Due to the size of the company and the fact that Herr Ulbrich designs all of the watches himself, there is little changeover in the models, but many models are limited productions, so some new models are variants of previous models. Production is approximately 700 watches per year. The list of models below is current as of 2020.

- CM01 (introduced in 2013): Minimalist 43mm design with date window and cyclops magnifier ground into the underside of the sapphire crystal rather than attached to the top surface.
- CM03 (introduced in 1997): 42mm GMT (independent second hour hand) watch with date display window and rotating bezel.
- CM05 (introduced in 2010): Minimalist 42mm watch with date display window and rotating bezel.
- CAMEO (released in 2008): Square dial, unique curved case watch with date display; its water resistance rating of 10 atm is higher than other square dial watches. The original model was limited to 500 pieces and came in brown with brown amber cabochon in the crown. The CAMEO S has a silver dial and black leather strap. The Cameo S was nominated for Watch of the Year award organized by the German watch magazine Armbanduhren and news magazine Welt am Sonntag in 2020, and was watch of the month in the April 2020 issue of Armbanduhren.
- CGK204: 43mm chronograph with day and date windows; month, moon phase, and 24-hour dial indications.
- CGK204 CURARE: CGK204 with black PVD finish and yellow accents.
- CGK205: 43mm GMT (independent second hour hand) chronograph, noted for its legibility, with day and date windows; month, moon phase, and 24-hour dial indications; and onyx cabochon insets.
- CLASSIC: 43mm chronograph with day and date display windows and onyx cabochon insets.
- CALLA: Unisex 35mm model with date window.
Temption watch model examples
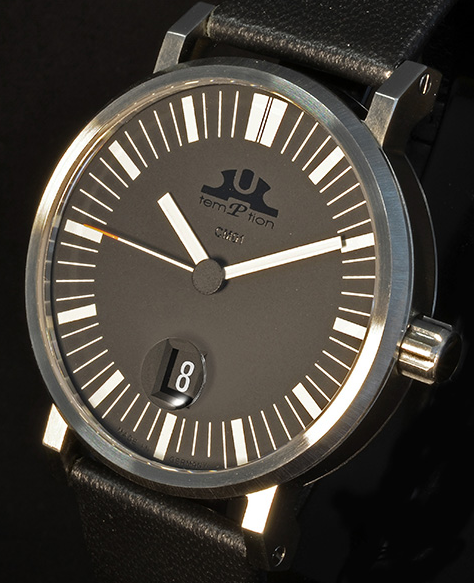
CM01

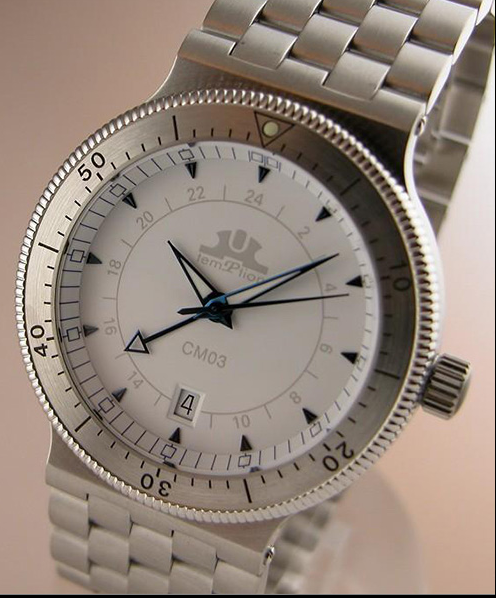
CM03

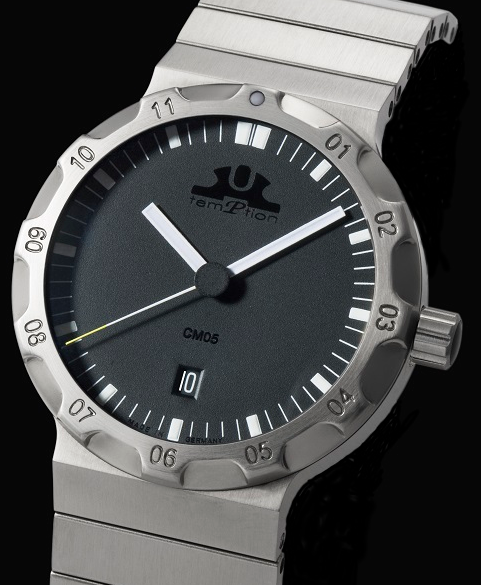
CM05

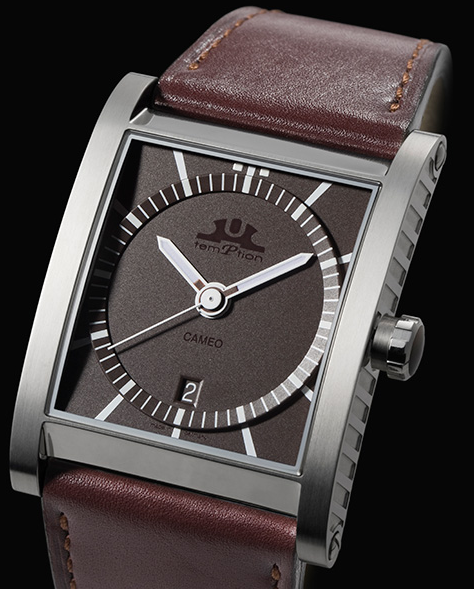
CAMEO

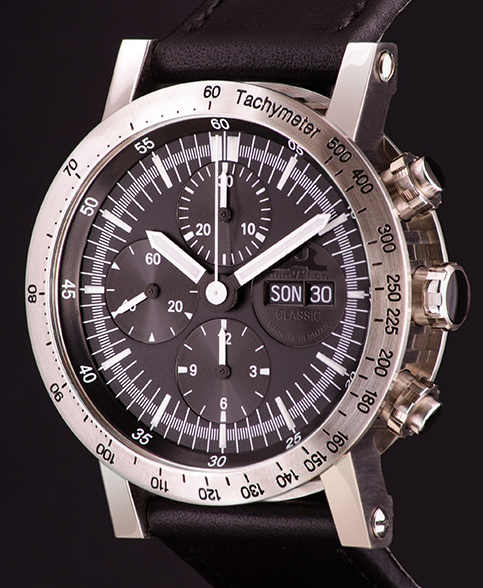
Classic

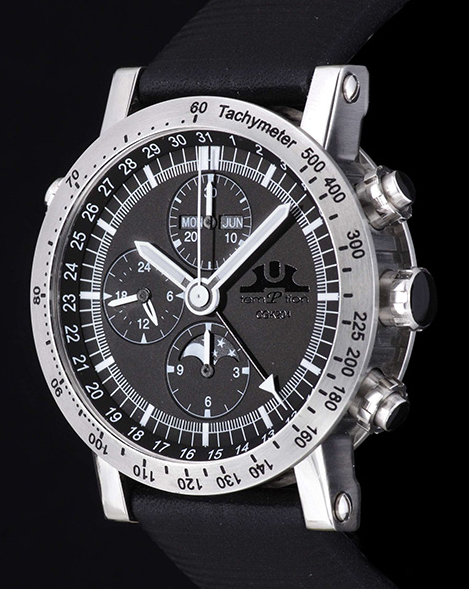
CGK204

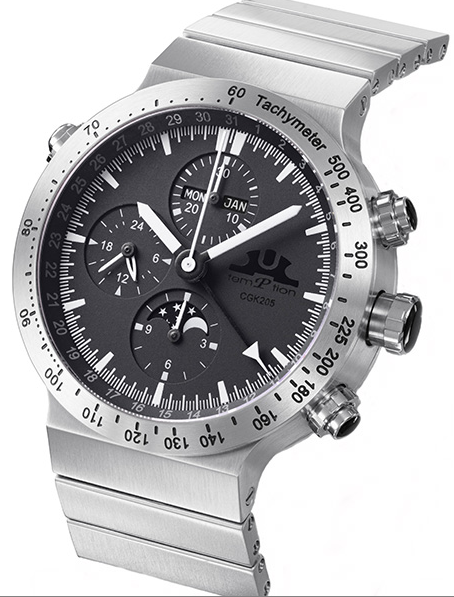
CGK205

=== Former models ===
- CM02: Intermediate (38mm) GMT with date window.
- CM06: Standard 3-hand watch with week, day, and power reserve subdials.
- CORA (listed on website, but out of production): Ladies 29mm watch with world's smallest chronograph movement, available in rose gold or stainless steel with optional diamond bezel and sharkskin strap. Stainless models were limited production of 300 pieces; gold, 75 pieces.
- 'CURIE: Intermediate (38mm) GMT with date display.
- CG103: 42mm chronograph with day and date displays.
- CGK203: 42mm chronograph with day and month displays, date, moon phase and 24-hour sub-dials, limited production of 1100 pieces.
- FORMULA: Chronograph with day and date displays.

In addition to watches, Temption also offers two rings designed by Mr. Ulbrich (stainless steel rings with an inset stone): CORUS (emerald, ruby or sapphire) and CESAR (onyx).

== See also ==
- List of German watch manufacturers
