= Wempe =

German jewelry company

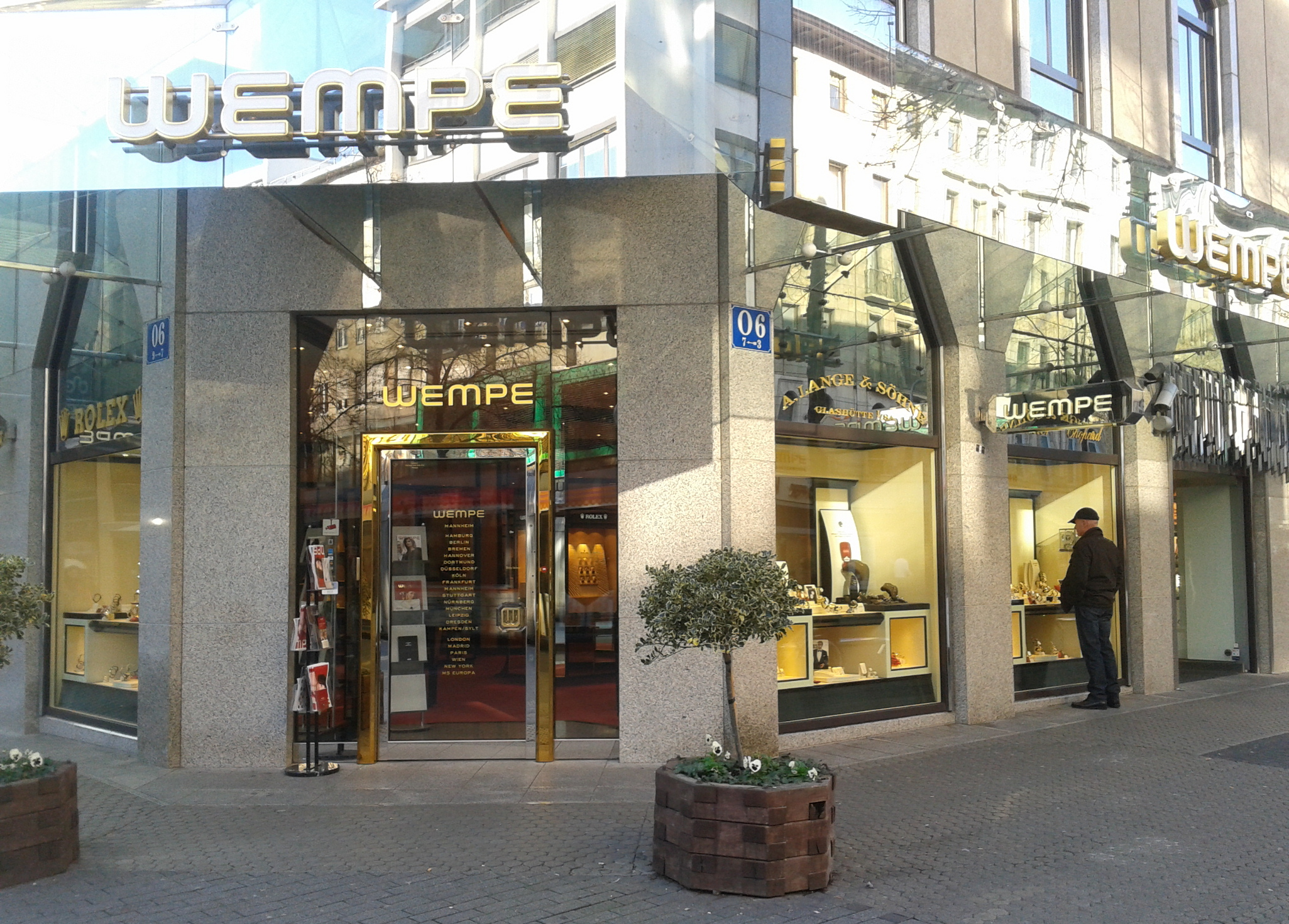
Juwelier Wempe

Wempe is a German luxury watch retailer established in 1878 which produces its own in-house watch brand. The watches are assembled in Glashutte, Germany. A majority of its timepieces are chronometer certified by Wempe at their Sternwarte observatory facility in Glashutte. Wempe retails watch brands including Cartier, Rolex, A. Lange & Söhne, Jaeger-LeCoultre, IWC, and Omega, and has collaborated with Longines, Girard-Perregaux, and Ulysse Nardin.

== See also ==
- List of German watch manufacturers
- A. Lange & Söhne
- Glashütte Original
- Nomos Glashütte
