= Damasko =

Watch manufacturer in Barbing, Germany

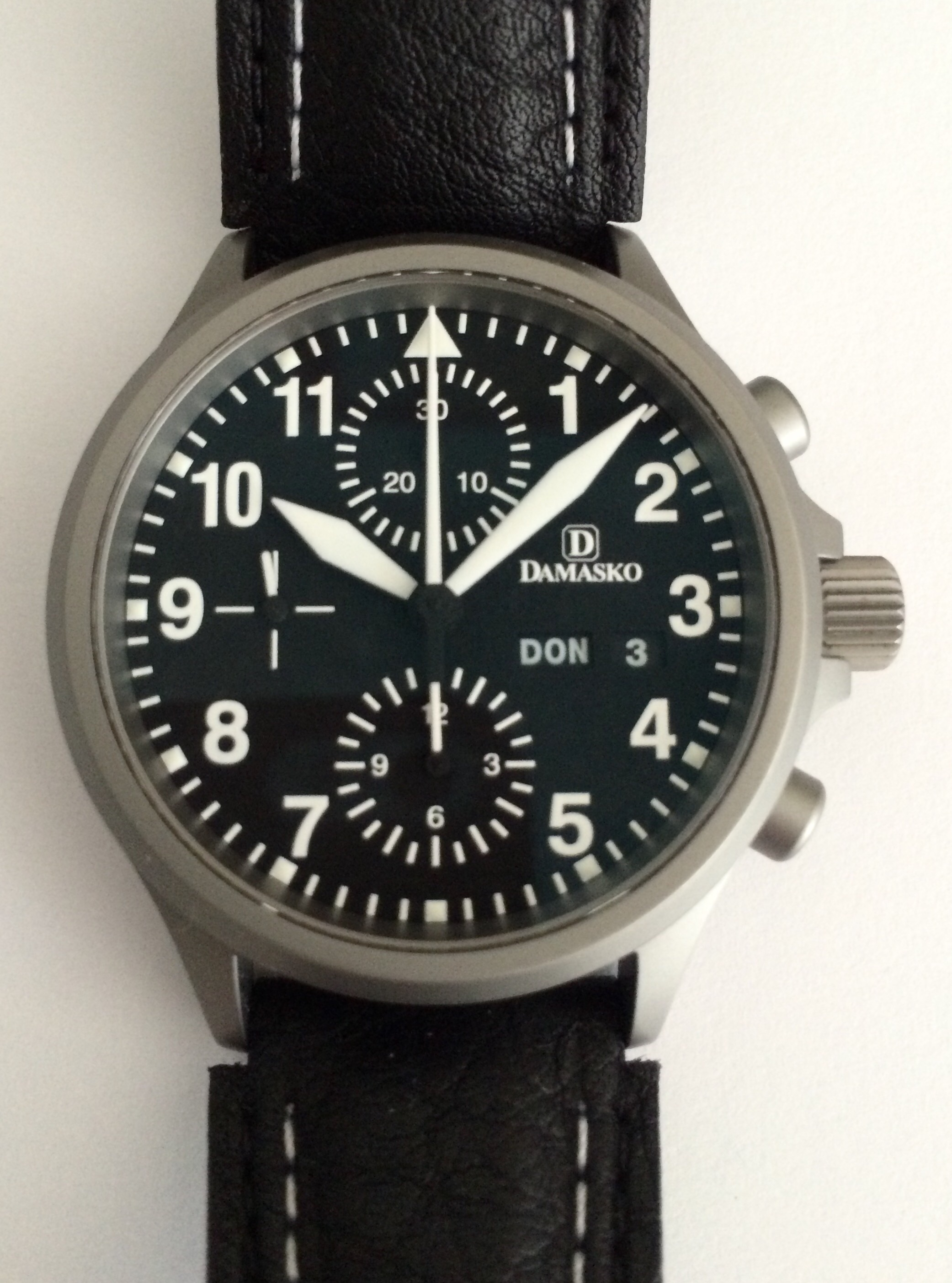
- Damasko DC56
- Industry: Watches
- Founded: 1994
- Founder: Konrad Damasko
- Headquarters: Barbing, Germany
- Products: Watches and timepieces
- Number of employees: 22
- Website: www.damasko.de

Damasko is a manufacturer of mechanical wristwatches and chronographs based in Barbing, Germany.

== History ==
Damasko was formed in 1994 using high-performance materials technology that the founder, Konrad Damasko, had developed for applications including the aerospace industry. Until their partnership ended in 2002, Damasko was a supplier of hardened watchcases to Sinn. In 2014 Damasko released its first models based on a movement designed themselves. Prior to this time its watches had relied upon movements sourced from companies such as Swiss ETA SA.

== Technology ==
Damasko holds patents in the use of polycrystalline silicon for components, including the spring. Damasko has also developed a nickel-free, nitrogen enriched martensitic alloy that is hardened up to 64 HRC/800 Vickers.

== Awards and certifications ==
The Damasko DC56 has been certified as an official wristwatch for Eurofighter test pilots. In 2015 the Damasko DA38 was nominated one of the best men's watches under €2000 by GQ magazine.

== See also ==
- List of German watch manufacturers
