= Alexander Shorokhoff =

German watch manufacturer

Alexander Shorokhoff Uhrenmanufaktur
- Industry: Watches
- Founded: 1992
- Founder: Alexander Shorokhoff
- Headquarters: Alzenau, Bavaria, Germany
- Products: Watches and timepieces
- Number of employees: 15
- Website: www.alexander-shorokhoff.com

Alexander Shorokhoff Uhrenmanufaktur is a German company producing mechanical luxury wristwatches with highly artistic design. The headquarters of the company is located in Alzenau, Germany. In September 2017, the manufacturer celebrated its 25th anniversary. Annual sales number approximately 1100 pieces.

== History ==
The founder of the enterprise is Mr. Alexander Shorokhov. He was born in 1960 in Moscow. During his studies of civil engineering he also attended a course in architecture. For his great achievements and commitment he became part of a group of 20 managers who were sent to Germany in 1991, on the basis of an agreement between the German chancellor Helmut Kohl and the Soviet leader Mikhail Gorbachev about the further training of young Russians in a free-market economy. Within one year, he established a sales company for the most important Russian watch brand Poljot with the aim to enable the commercialization of this brand in all European countries. In 1994, he started business with his first own watch brand “Poljot-International“ However, in order to come up to his great ambitions of making high-quality watches independently, he founded the “Alexander Shorokhoff watch manufacture" under his own name in Alzenau, Bavaria in the year 2003. The two letters “f“ at the end of the company’s name ought to underline his Russian roots and biography.

== Design ==
Whereas the form-factor of the watches is mostly traditional, their dials and faces are avant-garde, yet draw inspiration from the 1960s. Shorokhoff watches use the number "60" in place of the "12" at the top position of the dial, representing the 60 minutes of the hour. The design of these watches is inspired by the cultural and art history from all over the world. The artistic standard gets clear by the slogan "Art on the Wrist". A lot of these watches are made in limited edition of only few. The brand has three collections. The “Heritage"- collection has been dedicated to the Russian cultural and art heritage of the 19th century. By creating the models “Dostoevsky“, “Alexander Pushkin“, “Tolstoi“ and “Tchaikovsky“ the Alexander Shorokhoff watch manufacturer pays tribute to these great artists. At the same time, the artistic inspiration of these creations came apparent.Even though the design could be described as classical, it is likewise more specialized by the unusual colours and forms, the traditional engravings, skeletonizing and enamel coating. The "Avantgarde"-collection is symbolizing the Russian supremacism; at the same time the design of these watches integrates exceptional elements of shaping and unusual combinations of forms and colours. This is why the view of the watches is provoking and avant-garde like - exactly as their name reveals. The inspiration for the collection comes from the Russian and European art and culture. Models like “Miss Avantgarde“, “Babylonian“, “Barbara“, “Kandy“ and the tourbillon “Tomorrow“ are well characterizing the avant-garde image of the collection. The value of the watches is here also enhanced by fully featured movements with hand engravings or skeletonized dials.

"The "Vintage"-collection is very special in many aspects, but it belongs to the “Avantgarde"-line, too. The main feature of the "Vintage"-collection is the exclusive use of “Vintage”-movements of former Russian and Swiss production. These movements are renewed and refined in a long restoring process by exchanging some new manufactured parts for old ones and final engraving.

== Awards ==
Besides the watch models "Miss Avantgarde" and "Babylonian I", which were nominated for the German Design Award in 2014 and 2015, the following models have won the title "Special Mention" of the German Design Award: "Barbara" (in 2016)> and "Winter" (in 2017). The watch "Camomile" has been declared the winner of the German Design Award in 2018 by the German Council of Design. The watch "Regulator AS.R02-1" won the third place in the category A in the competition for the “Golden balance"/”Goldene Unruh” in 2017" and was chosen by the readers of specialized watch magazines.

== Production details ==
The watch movements are purchased from well-known Russian and Swiss producers with the basic calibres by Dubois Depraz, Concepto, Soprod and ETA. The movements are refined and hand engraved at the manufactory of “Alexander Shorokhoff“. The screws are also blued here; the dials and cases are covered by enamel. The production of own manufactory movements is planned; at the moment the manufacturer is already making its special modules for the regulators and chrono-regulators. For every watch one watchmaker bears the responsibility. All watches are delivered with a hand signed certificate including several details about the deviation of running data and the amplitude as well as a certificate of origin.

== See also ==
- List of German watch manufacturers
