= MeisterSinger (watchmaker) =

German watch manufacturer

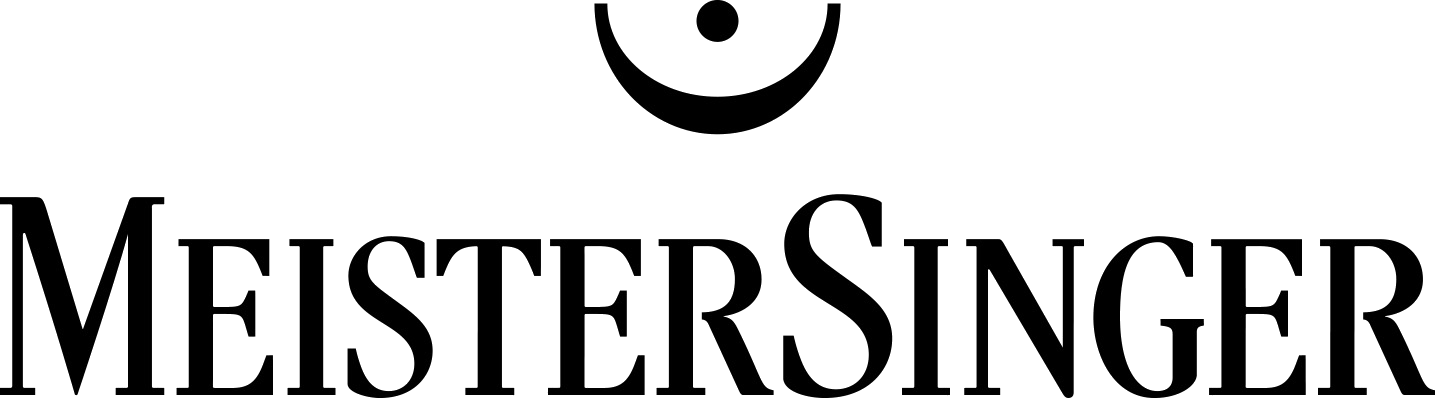
- Industry: Watches
- Founded: 2001
- Founder: Manfred Brassler
- Headquarters: Münster, Germany
- Products: Watches and timepieces
- Number of employees: 20
- Website: www.meistersinger.com

MeisterSinger is a manufacturer of mechanical wristwatches. The company is based in Münster, Germany. Annual sales are claimed to be 10,000 pieces.

== History ==
Weller Manfred Brassler, a self-taught jeweler, founded the company "Watch People" with Klaus Botta in 1989. The watches produced were primarily quartz. He sold the company in 1999, so that he might pursue his interest in the creation of higher-end mechanical timepieces. In 2001 MeisterSinger was formed. The name was chosen to draw parallels to a title given to German singers in the Middle Ages who had discovered new melodic elements.

== Design ==
MeisterSinger watches distinguish themselves from others by the fact that they use a single hand rather than two or three. This feature of sundials and some old clock towers, for example Westminster Abbey, acted as inspiration behind the design. In 2013 MeisterSinger released a watch based on the Westminster Abbey clock face to commemorate the 60th anniversary of the coronation of Queen Elizabeth II.

Additionally, to create a sense of symmetry, the hours 1-9 are prefixed with a "0" such that every number on the dial has double-digits.

Historically MeisterSinger used movements sourced from ETA SA, but due to limited availability chose to develop their own in-house movement.

== Awards ==
In 2015, the MeisterSinger Circularis won an IF product design award. In 2016, the Adhaesio model won both an IF award and a Red Dot award.

== See also ==
- List of German watch manufacturers
