= CCO =

CCO or cco may refer to:

== Organizational positions ==
- Chief commercial officer, the executive responsible for commercial strategy and development
- Chief communications officer, or sometimes, Corporate communications officer, the executive responsible for communications, public relations or public affairs or both
- Chief compliance officer, the executive responsible for compliance with regulatory requirements
- Chief content officer, the executive responsible for content in broadcasting
- Chief creative officer, the executive responsible for the creative team of a company
- Chief customer officer, the executive responsible for the total relationship with customers
- Chief culture officer, the executive position responsible for cultural alignment of a company, described in a 2009 book by Grant McCracken
- Civilian Communications Officer, a position in the Central Communications Command of London's Metropolitan Police Service

== Organizations ==
- Cancer Care Ontario, the provincial agency responsible for improvement of cancer services in Ontario, Canada
- Catholic Christian Outreach, a Catholic campus ministry organization in Canadian universities
- Cayuga Chamber Orchestra, an orchestra based in Ithaca, New York
- Center for Contemporary Opera, an opera company based in New York City
- Chandigarh Comets, a hockey team in Chandigarh, India
- City Centre Offices, an English/German record label for electronic music
- Clear Channel Outdoor, an outdoor advertising company
- Coalition for Christian Outreach, a Christian campus ministry organization in American colleges
- Coordinated Care Organization, a network created by the state of Oregon to integrate healthcare services and contain cost increases through improved quality of care
- Council-controlled organisation, a local government trading organization in New Zealand
- Royal Canadian College of Organists (formerly the Canadian College of Organists)

== Other ==
- Canadian Computing Olympiad
- Central compact object
- Combined cardiac output
- Constitutive role of communication in organizations, a theory describing the interaction of members of an organization
- Newnan–Coweta County Airport in Coweta County, Georgia
- Carolina, Clinchfield and Ohio Railway, owned by Clinchfield Railroad
- Cataloging Cultural Objects, a metadata standard developed by the Visual Resources Association
- Conservative Central Office, now the Conservative Campaign Headquarters of the British Conservative Party
- cco, the ISO 639-3 code for the Comaltepec Chinantec language
- M68 Close Combat Optic, referring to the Aimpoint CompM2 or its later version the Aimpoint CompM4

== See also ==
- C_{2}O, or dicarbon monoxide
- CC0 (the '0' is a zero), a mechanism designed by Creative Commons for releasing material into the public domain
