= Sinn (watchmaker) =

German wristwatch manufacturer

Sinn Spezialuhren GmbH
- Industry: Watches (especially for use in aviation)
- Founded: 1961
- Founder: Helmut Sinn
- Headquarters: Frankfurt am Main, Germany
- Products: Watches and timepieces
- Website: www.sinn.de

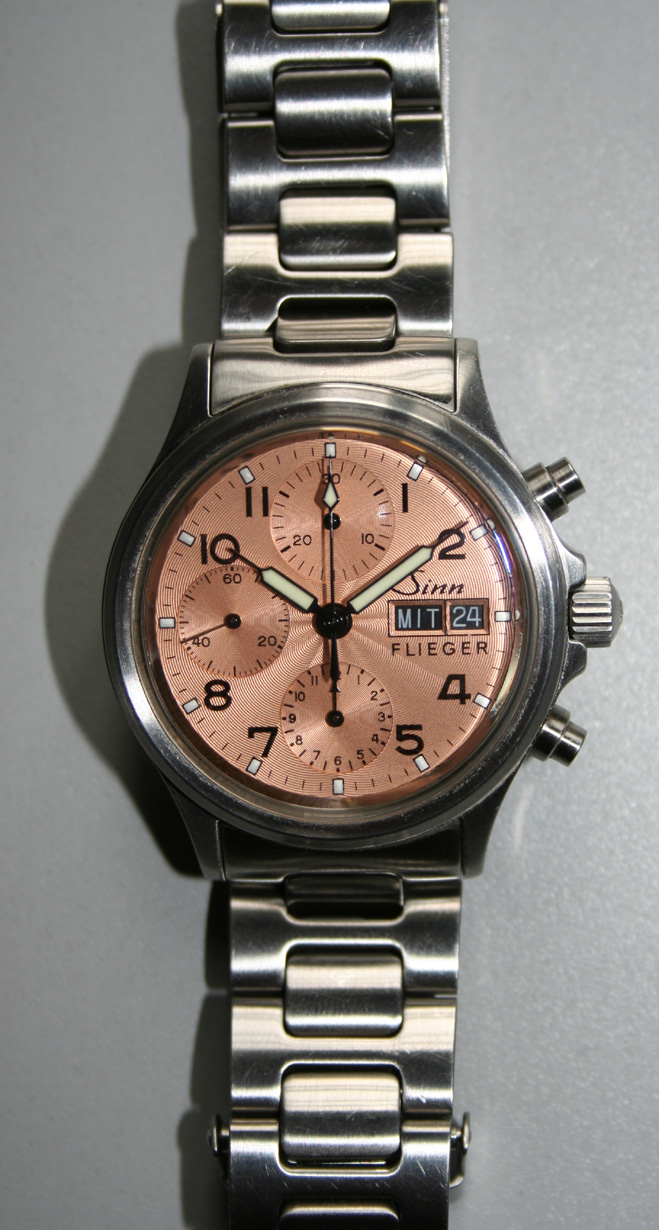
Sinn Model 356 Flieger II

Sinn (German pronunciation: [zɪn]) is a German manufacturer of mechanical and quartz wristwatches based in Frankfurt am Main. The company was founded in 1961 by flight instructor and Luftwaffe pilot Helmut Sinn (1916–2018) under the name ‘Helmut Sinn Spezialuhren’.

== History ==
Following its foundation in 1961, the company focused on the manufacture of navigation cockpit clocks and pilot chronographs and sold these through direct selling, bypassing retailers. The clocks and watches were produced according to pilot Helmut Sinn's specifications in the private label sector in Switzerland.

In the 1960’ and 1970s Sinn manufactured cases for military and consumer purposes, most notably the Heuer/Sinn Bundeswehr, of which there were two general configurations of Sinn-branded dials that included the Heuer logo: the "3H-only" - a red 3H-symbol appears just below the center, and the "clean" - no markings beyond the "Heuer" logo, and two with only the Sinn logo.

In 1985, the Sinn 140 S chronograph was among the first automatic chronographs to be used in space.

In 1994, Helmut Sinn sold the company to Lothar Schmidt. Following the sale, he acquired Swiss watchmaker Guinand in 1996. In 1998, he set up a new company in Frankfurt am Main. With this company, he offered brand watches from Jubilar, Chronosport and the newly acquired Guinand. In 2006, he retired from business activity. After handing over the management of the business to his long-standing employee Horst Hassler, he acted as an advisor to the company. On 3 September 2016 Helmut Sinn celebrated his 100th birthday. His death at age 102 was announced in February 2018.

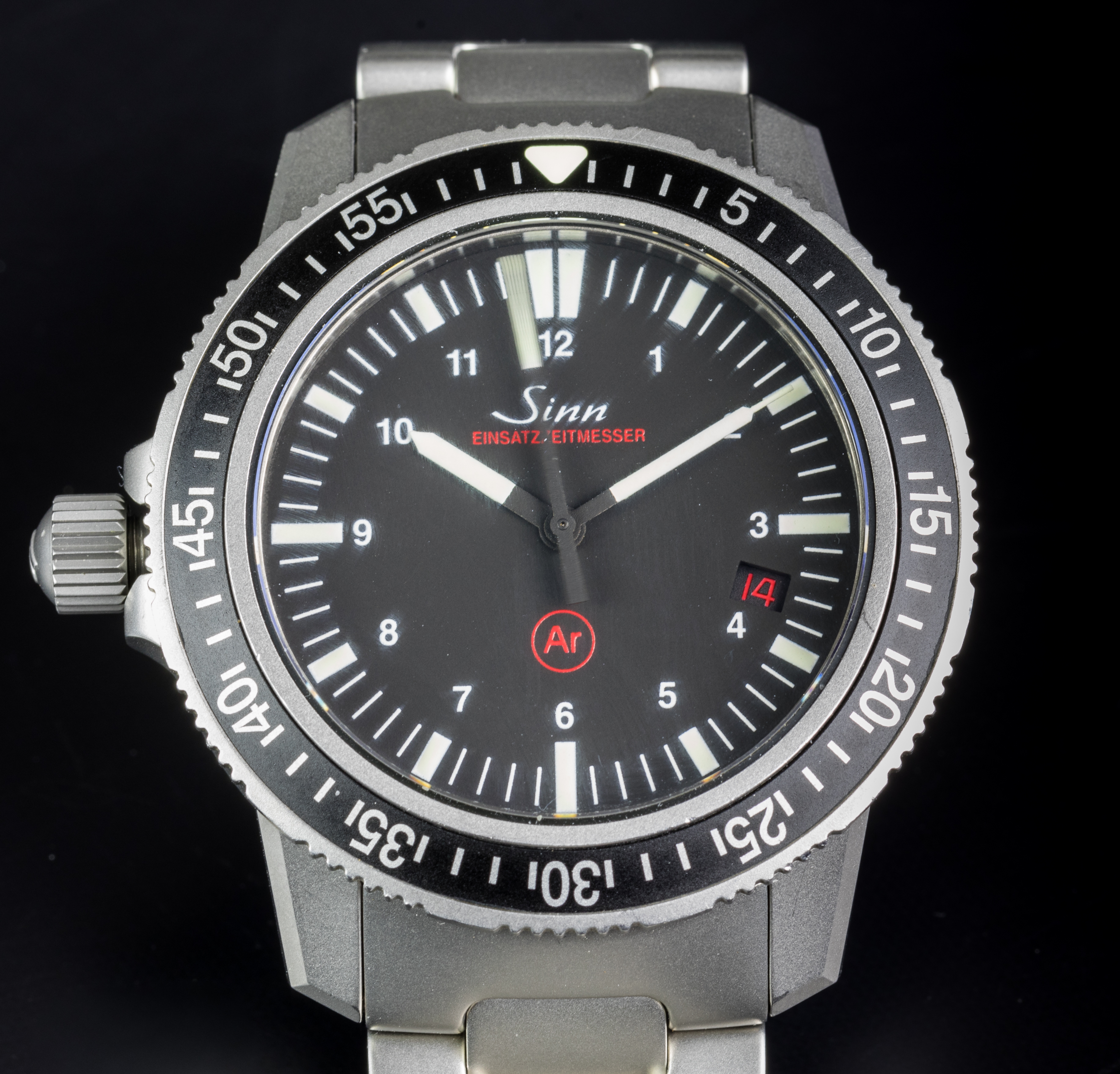
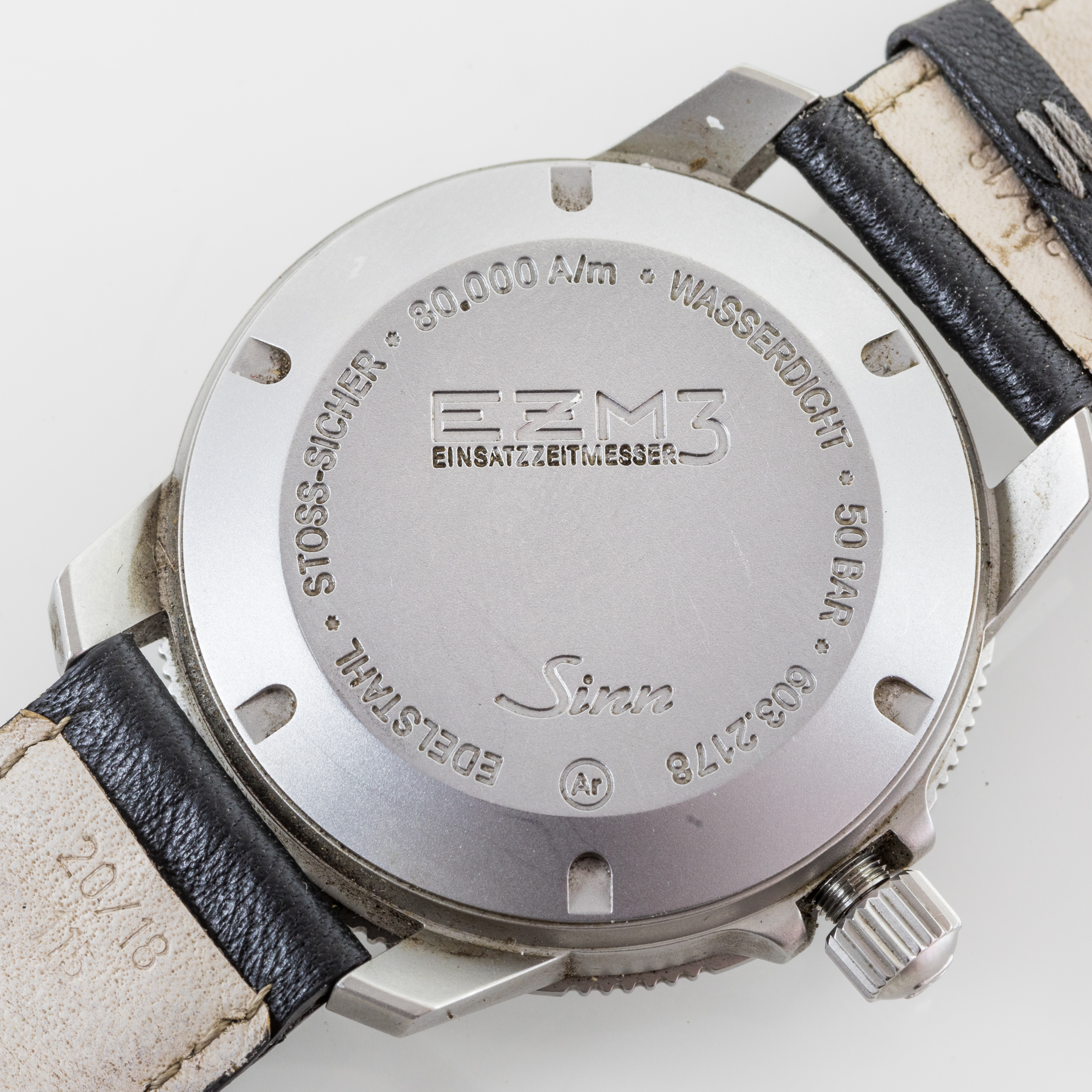
Diving watch Sinn "Einsatzzeitmesser 3" (EZM 3), highly resistant against shock, pressure and magnetic fields

Mission timers (in German: "Einsatzzeitmesser") for professional users also play an important role. These include special forces such as the marine unit of the German federal police GSG 9, the fire service, divers and pilots. German physicist and astronaut Reinhard Furrer wore the 140 S on his wrist during the Spacelab D1 mission in 1985, thus proving that a mechanical SINN watch with automatic movement also works with zero gravity. During the Mir ’92 mission in 1992, astronaut Klaus-Dietrich Flade flew into space with a 142 S from Sinn Spezialuhren on his wrist. In 1993, it was the 142 from Sinn Spezialuhren that was on board the Columbia on Mission D2.

== Awards ==
Sinn watches won first place at the Goldene Unruh awards in the following years:

- 1998: 103 Ti Ar (watches up to 2,000 Marks)
- 2006: Frankfurt Financial District Watch in white gold (watches up to 10,000 euros)
- 2008: 6100 REGULATEUR rose gold
- 2010: 900 PILOT
- 2010: 6100 REGULATEUR rose gold
- 2012: Frankfurt Financial District Watch in platinum

== Watches ==
Standard models are mechanical watches like the Sinn Pilot Chronograph 103 or the Space Chronograph 140.

Usually technical details include pressure-resistant up to 20 bar and more, as well as anti-magnetic functionality according DIN 8309.

Furthermore, the Pilot Chronograph EZM 10 TESTAF ensures a reliable functionality from minus 45 degree Celsius up to plus 80 degree Celsius.

The Sinn 144 GMT was designed around a Porsche Design Orfina/Prestige Watch International.

The diving watch for special operation forces of the navy like the Sinn Diving watch U2 for example has the following specifications:

- completely made with high-strength seawater-resistant German submarine steel
- clock work: self-winding mechanism by mechanical movement or manually by winding the crown of the watch
- Sapphire crystal glass in front, anti-reflective on both sides
- functionally reliable from - 45 degree Celsius up to +80 degree Celsius
- pressure-resistant to 2000 meter (m) diving depth
- anti-magnetic as per DIN 8309

The German special forces unit of the federal police GSG 9 uses the Sinn UX watch for its maritime forces.

The Sinn 857 UTC chronograph watch was carried by Alan Eustace during his gas balloon flight to near space and skydive back to Earth. The watch performed before, during and after it was exposed to cold temperatures, down to -77 celsius, the low pressure of near vacuum, and a freefall speed of 1,322.9 km/h breaking the sound barrier.

== See also ==
- List of German watch manufacturers
- A. Lange & Söhne
- Tutima
- Junghans
- NOMOS Glashütte
