= Kienzle Uhren =

German watchmaking company

Kienzle Uhren GmbH
- Industry: Time measuring devices
- Founded: 1822
- Headquarters: Hamburg, Germany
- Key people: Stephan W. Kruse-Thamer (CEO)
- Products: watches
- Website: www.kienzle1822.de

Kienzle Uhren GmbH are Germany's oldest watchmakers. The company was founded by Johannes Schlenker in 1822 in Schwenningen, Germany. Since 2002, the company's headquarters have been in Hamburg, Germany.

== History ==
Kienzle original logo

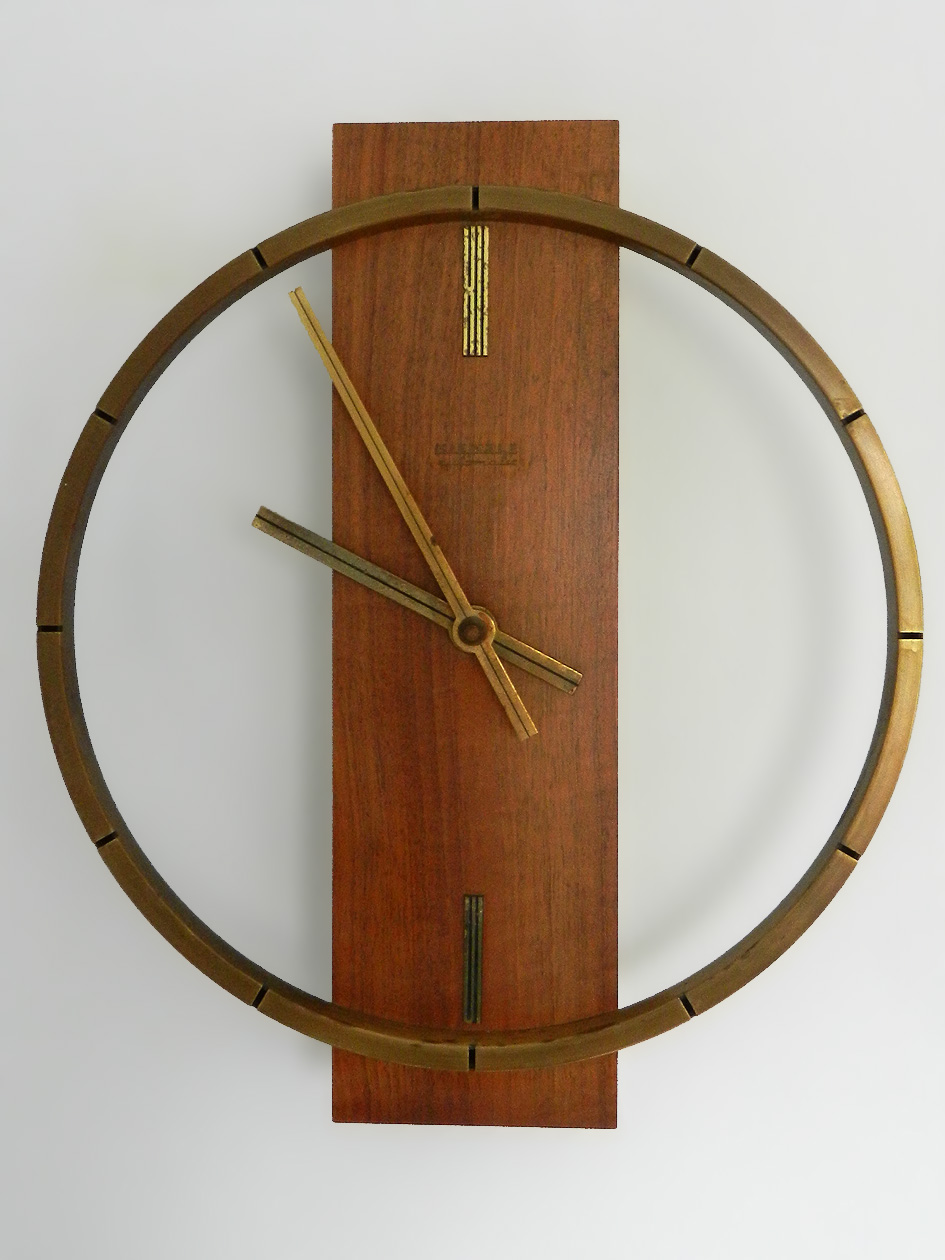
Kienzle Automatic

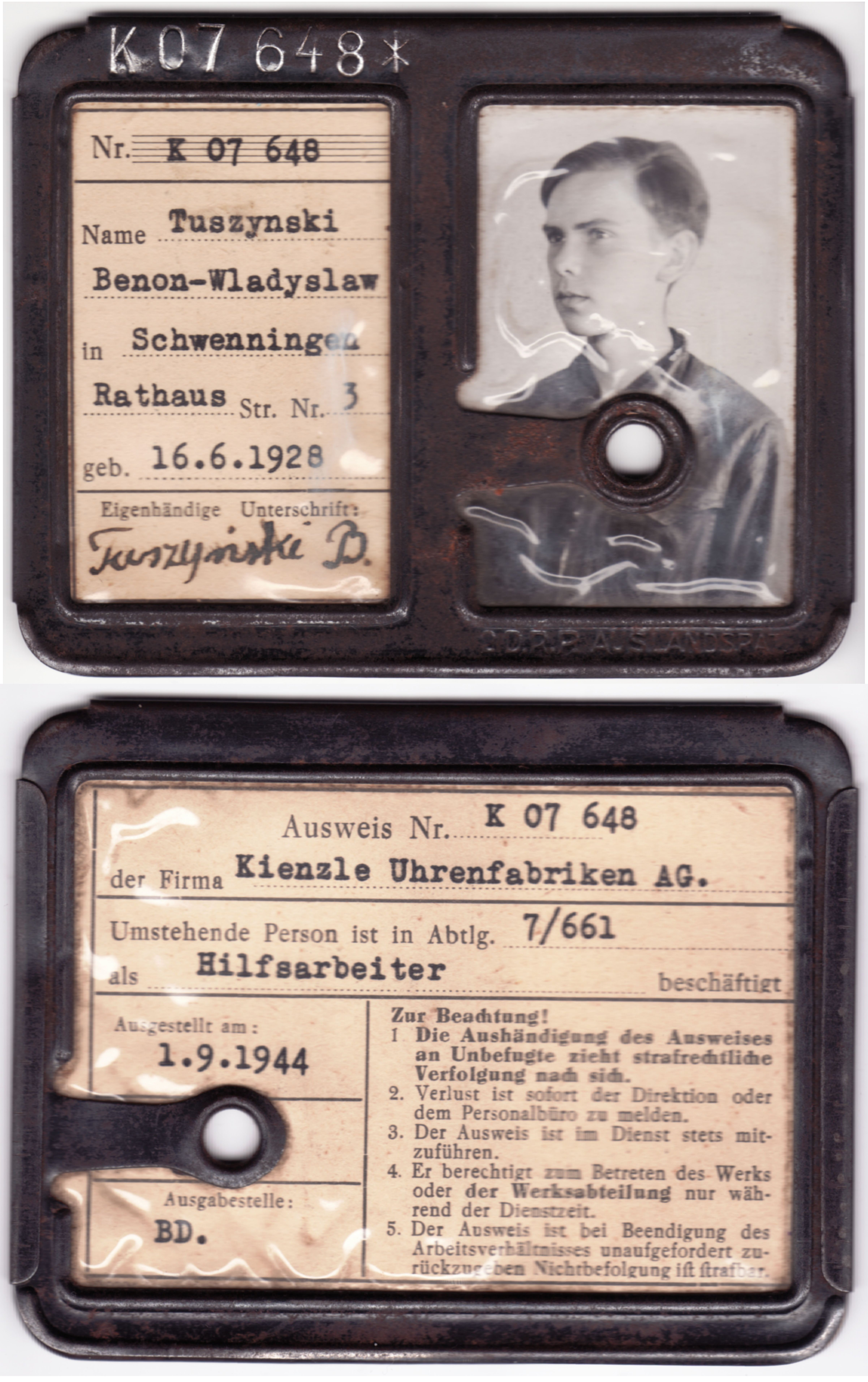
Kienzle Uhren factory ID card, from 1944, of 16 years old forced labor worker from Poland

In 1883, Jakob Kienzle married into the Schlenker family, and became a partner in the company. The company was renamed to Schlenker & Kienzle from 1883 until 1922, when it became a stockholder corporation under the name Kienzle Uhrenfabrik, A.G. (Kienzle Clock Factories, A.G.).

When the company introduced the "American System" of production in 1894, standardized individual components, and perforated plates, the cost of alarm clocks and wall clocks was significantly reduced. In 1897, Jakob Kienzle became the sole owner, and the name of the company was eventually changed to Kienzle. In the following years branches in Milan, Paris, and London were established. In 1899, the company was producing 162,000 watches and alarm clocks per year.

In 1902, Kienzle launched the time stamp clock on the market and the first clocks for automobiles. The "Strapazier-Armbanduhr" was presented in 1931, and 25 million were sold.

At the end of the 1930s, Kienzle started the manufacture of two table clocks in the upper price segment: the Zodiac Clock and the World Time Clock. After the Second World War Kienzle continued production with established articles and new products like a parking meter equipped with the latest technology.

During World War II, the company augmented the employed work force with slave labour from Poland and other conquered areas. The factory produced and supplied a range of timing instruments and watches for the German and Axis armed forces. These included chronograph 8-day cockpit clocks for Messerschmitt and Heinkel aircraft as well as wrist and pocket watches for general purchase, and for the Wehrmacht and Luftwaffe.

In 1956, the "Volksautomatik" was introduced to the market. Energy is provided by a rotor that winds in both directions, and instead of steel pins, the lever is fitted with ruby pins.

In the 1960s, Kienzle produced dashboard clocks for Mercedes-Benz, Rolls-Royce and Bentley: both Series 1 Silver Shadow, and Bentley T models were fitted with Kienzle clocks.

In the 1960s and 1970s, Kienzle became a market leader in Germany. In 1972, the first solar watch, "Heliomat", was produced as well as the first quartz movements. In the following years, Kienzle was the first company to present a quartz travel alarm clock.

In 1986, Kienzle developed the first solar watch with light conditions and a polycrystalline solar element. In the early 1990s, Kienzle developed the most water-resistant watch in the world which was resistant up to 12,000 metres. They also developed the world's first radio-controlled atomic alarm clock with an analogue alarm setting.

In 1996, a new radio-controlled movement was developed: the smallest dual-motor, radio-controlled movement with the fastest setting system. This movement corrects to the right time within five minutes.

== Present ==
In 1997, Kienzle was taken over by the Hong Kong-based Highway Holdings Group. But only five years later in 2002, Kienzle returned to Germany with the establishment of Kienzle AG. The company employs over 450 workers in its new factory. Since that time, the headquarters is located in Hamburg. The company purchased worldwide brand and distribution rights and began with the development and fabrication of three new watch collections in different price segments.

In 2008, Kienzle moved into the current headquarters, a merchant's house in Hamburg-Harvestehude.

In the future Kienzle, plans to extend to a medium-sized lifestyle brand. Kienzle Optik is the first expansion segment to be launched on the market. However, watches and clocks will remain the core area of the brand.

== Sponsoring ==
Kienzle regularly sponsors different projects, but increasingly focuses on sport. In 1992, Katja Seizinger was supported in the Olympic Games.

Kienzle sponsored the SG Flensburg-Handewitt. From the 2009/2010 season, Kienzle is an official partner of the Hamburg sports club and will support the Bundesliga-watch in the arena.

Kienzle supports the Hamburg Leuchtfeuer Hospiz which is under the patronage of former Hamburg mayor Ole von Beust.

== See also ==
- List of German watch manufacturers
