= Nomos Glashütte =

German watchmaking company

NOMOS Glashütte
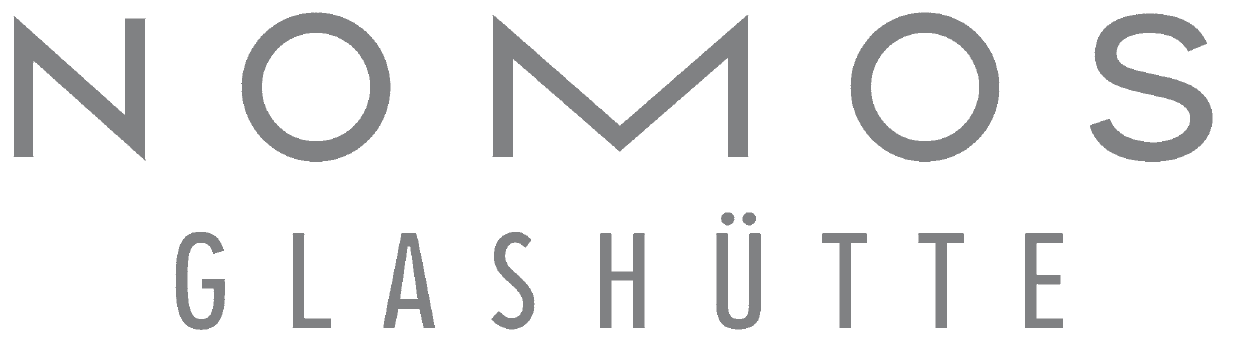

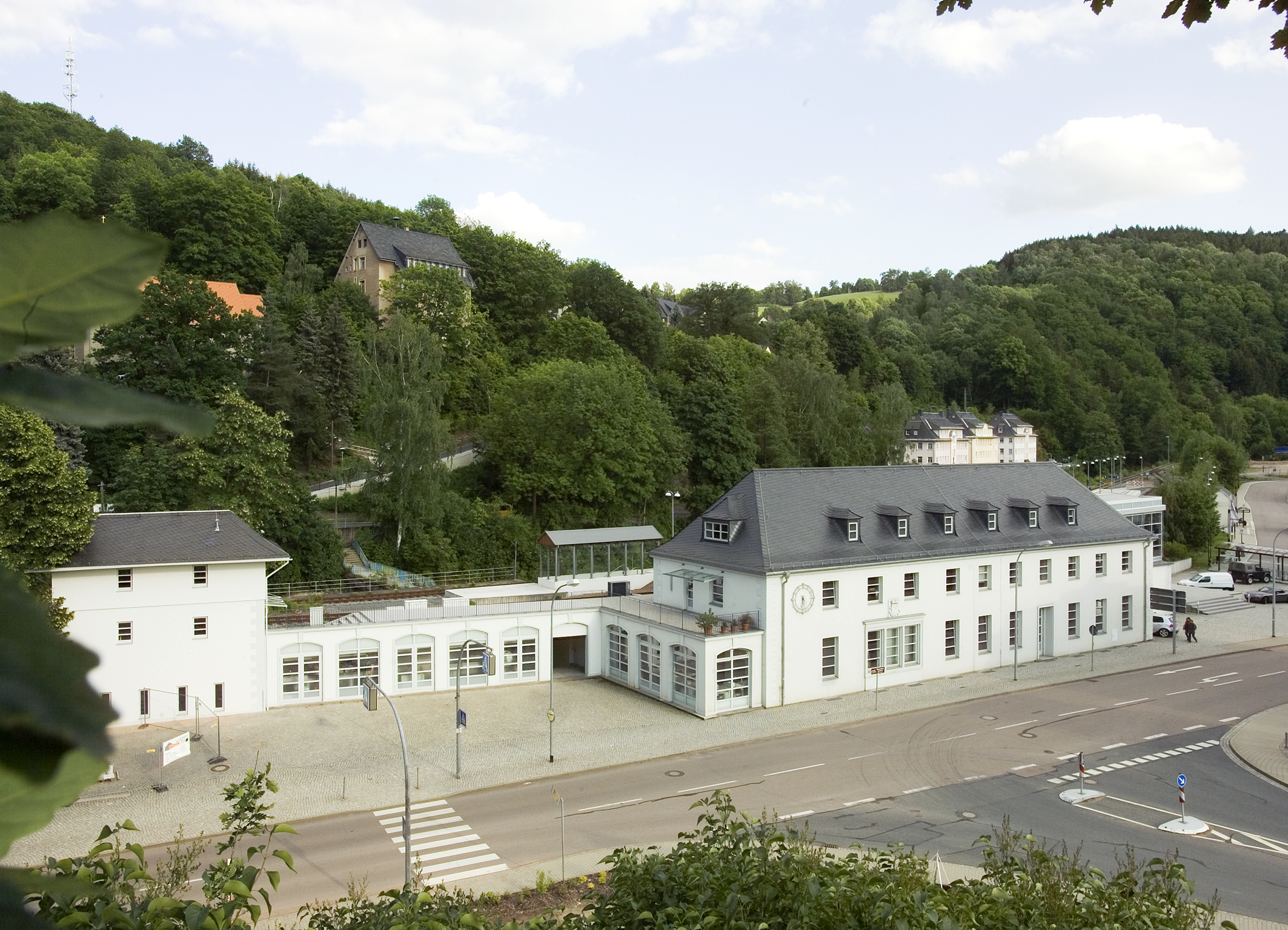
- NOMOS Glashütte headquarters inside the former Glashütte station building
- Industry: Watchmaking
- Founded: 1990
- Founder: Roland Schwertner
- Headquarters: Glashütte, Germany
- Key people: Uwe Ahrendt (CEO)
- Products: Watches
- Number of employees: 300 (2016)
- Website: nomos-glashuette.com

NOMOS Glashütte is a German watchmaking company based in Glashütte, Saxony, specializing in artisan manual-winding and automatic mechanical watches. It was founded by Roland Schwertner in January 1990, two months after the fall of the Berlin Wall. The first collection of designs was drawn up by Susanne Günther, who took influence from the Bauhaus purist style. NOMOS designs are known for their clean and modernist aesthetics.

== History ==
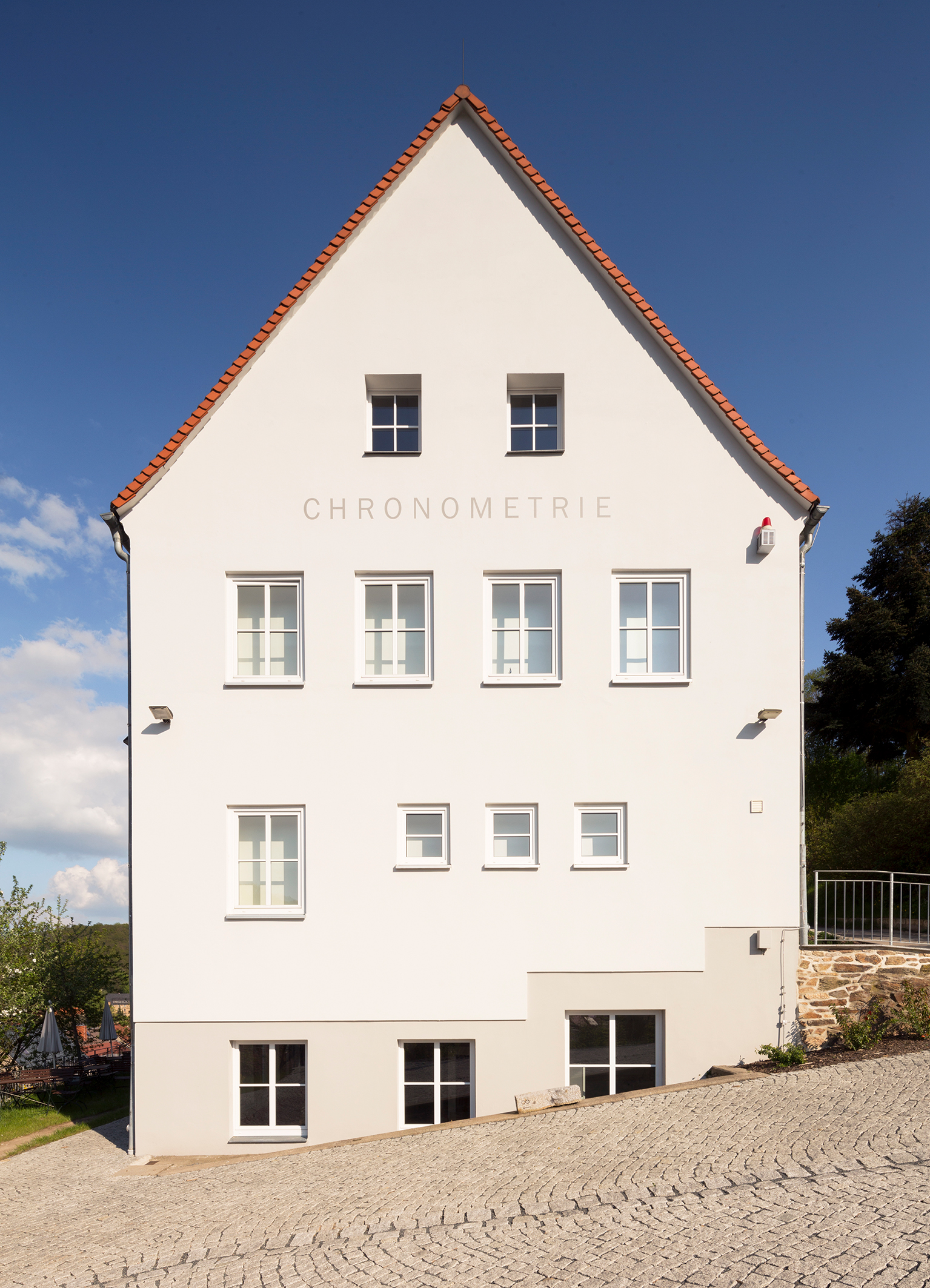
The chronometry building on Am Erbenhang where all NOMOS watches are handmade.

"Nomos" (νόμος) means law or rule in Greek. In 1906, a company called "Nomos-Uhr-Gesellschaft, Guido Müller & Co." started importing Swiss watches and distributing them with the more prestigious addition, “Glashütte/Sachsen”. For a watch company to include “Glashütte” in their name, at least 50% of the caliber must be manufactured in Glashütte; this is up to 95% for NOMOS Glashütte, but was not the case for the Nomos-Uhr-Gesellschaft. The renowned company A. Lange & Söhne took them to court and in 1910 the Nomos-Uhr-Gesellschaft ceased business operations. The Nomos-Uhr-Gesellschaft from the early 1900s and today's NOMOS Glashütte have nothing more than the name Nomos in common.

In 1990, Roland Schwertner, an IT expert and photographer from Düsseldorf, registered the trademark NOMOS Glashütte/SA. The first collection of NOMOS watches came out shortly thereafter in 1992. NOMOS Glashütte currently has three sites in Glashütte, a place renowned for its tradition of watchmaking. The administration department can be found in the former Glashütte station building, while most of the watchmakers are located on Am Erbenhang street. Since 2017, a further manufacturing facility can be found in the Schlottwitz district. Annual production is approximately 20,000 pieces. In its early years, the company focused on manufacturing mechanical watches with hand-wound movements. Until 2005, the basis for these movements was the Swiss-made ETA SA/Peseux 7001. Since April 2005, NOMOS Glashütte has only used in-house movements. Beginning with α (Alpha), a manual winding caliber, the range has since been expanded to include a range of other manual winding movements with additional functions. The first automatic NOMOS watch, the Tangomat, was first introduced in the summer of 2005.

In 2014, the company unveiled its own in-house escapement, known as the NOMOS swing system, which made it no longer reliant on Swiss manufacturers. This new component was gradually introduced into NOMOS’ caliber range. Since 2016, the company has concentrated on upgrading its caliber range with the NOMOS swing system; once upgraded, the calibers receive a name beginning with "DUW". This acronym stands for "Deutsche Uhrenwerke" and is intended to highlight the company's in-house caliber production.

The calibers in the company's neomatik (“new automatic”) series are considerably thin. NOMOS Glashütte introduced DUW 3001, its tenth in-house caliber, in 2015.

== Models ==
The brand started production in 1992 with four basic models: Tangente, Orion, Ludwig, and Tetra. NOMOS Glashütte has since gradually expanded its range of watches to include new models and sizes, such as Club and Metro. In 2013 the company introduced two gold models to its collection, Lambda and Lux. There are currently thirteen NOMOS watch models, which come in a number of variations. These are:

The four classic NOMOS models

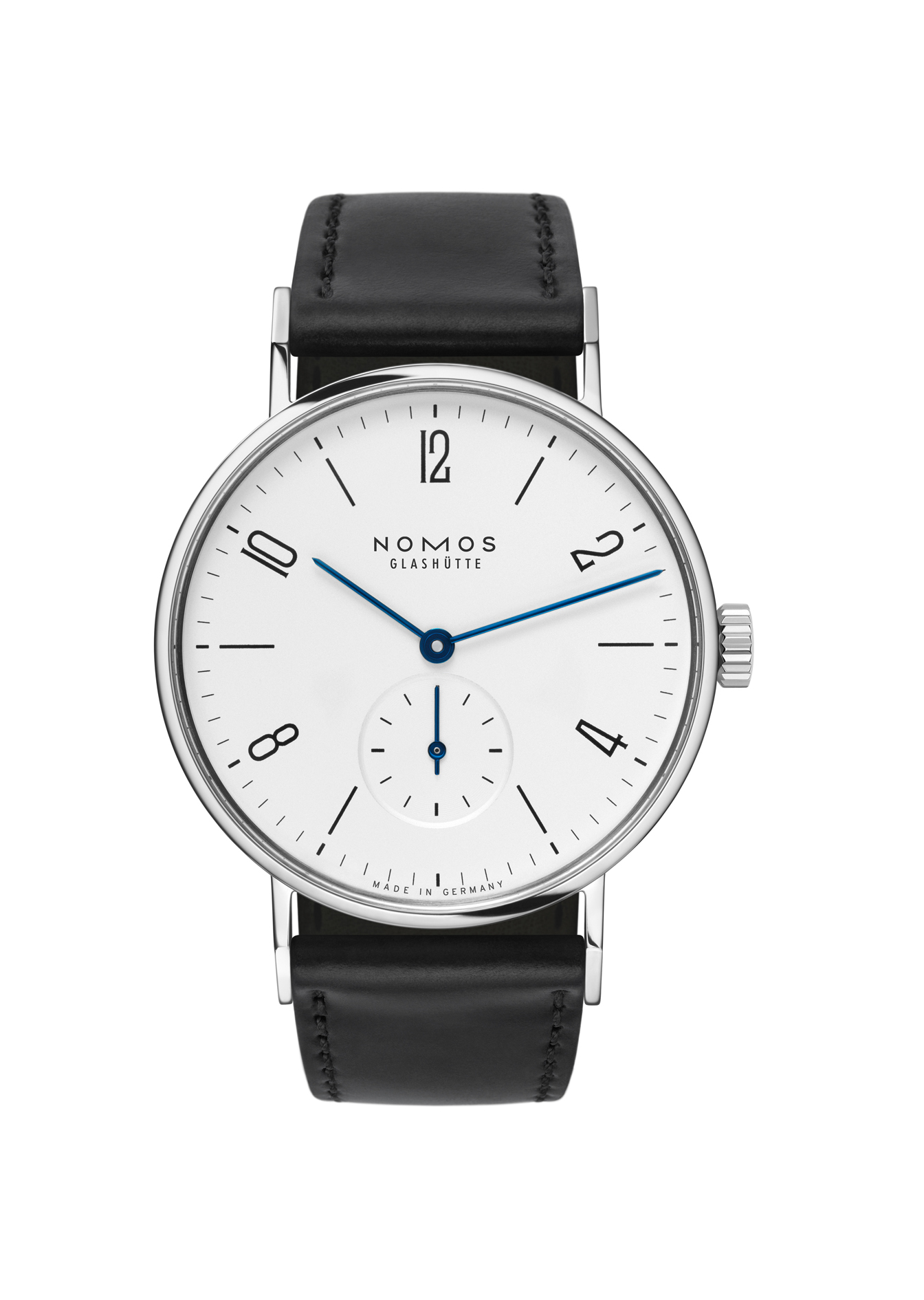
Tangente

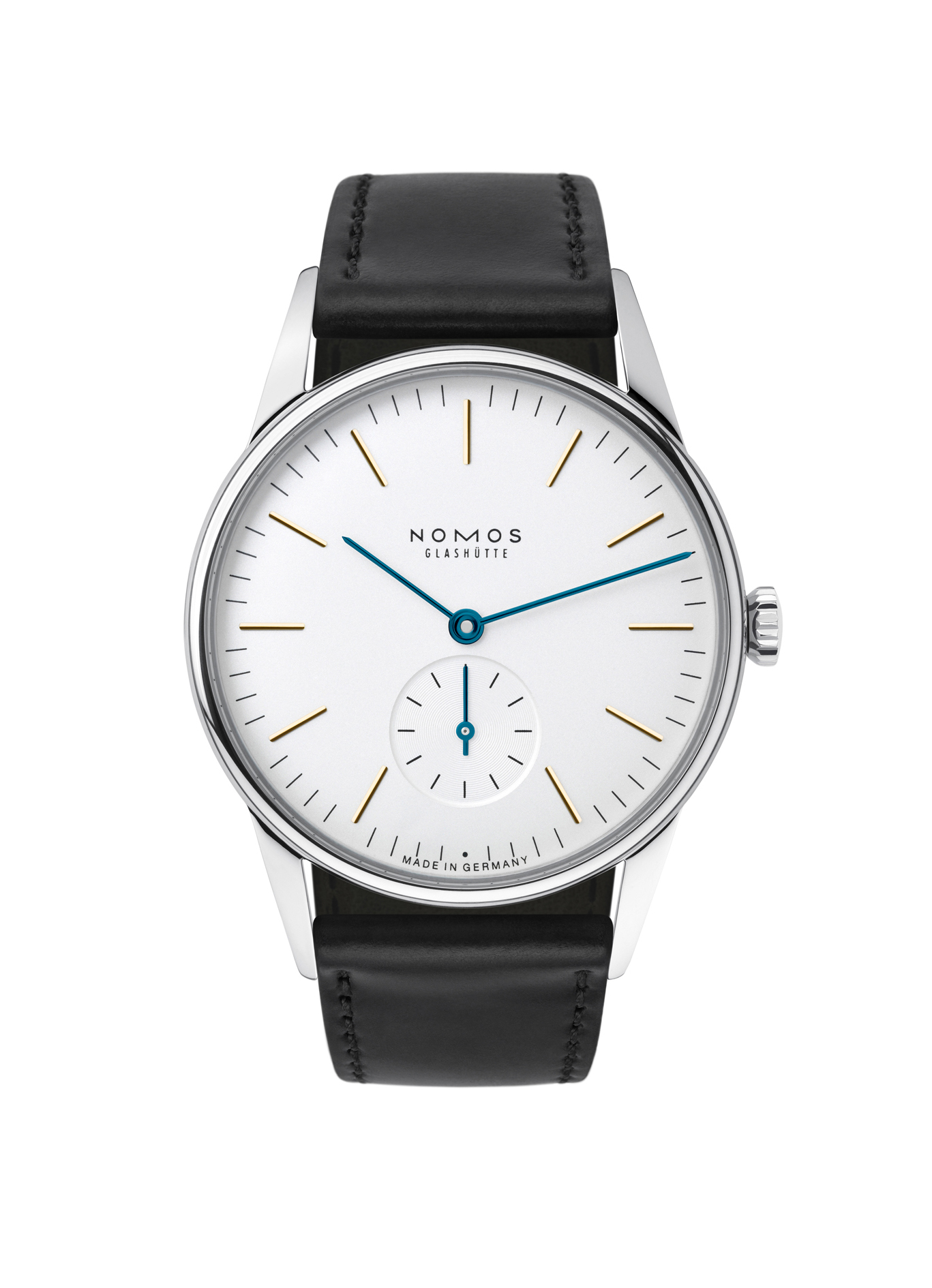
Orion

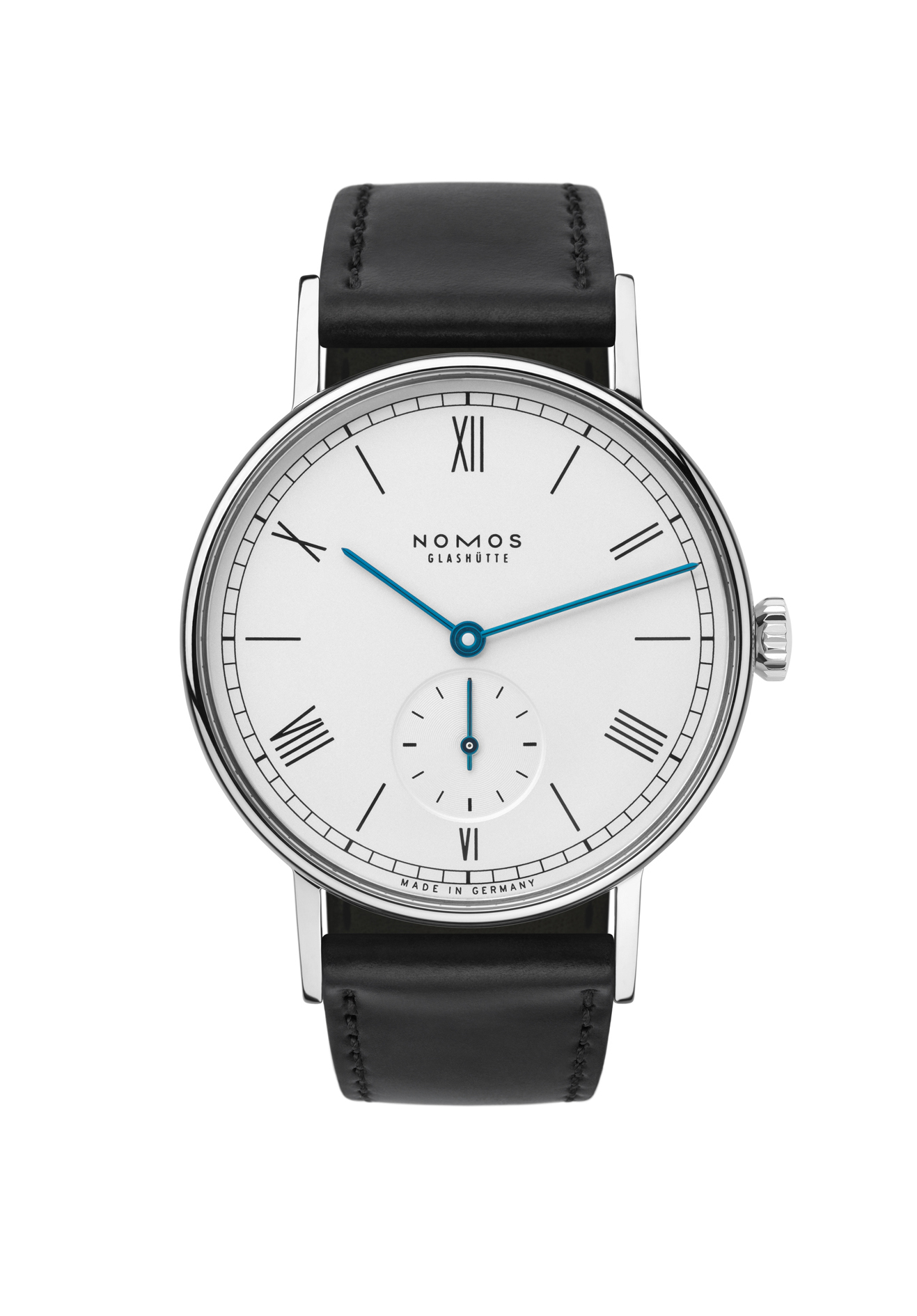
Ludwig

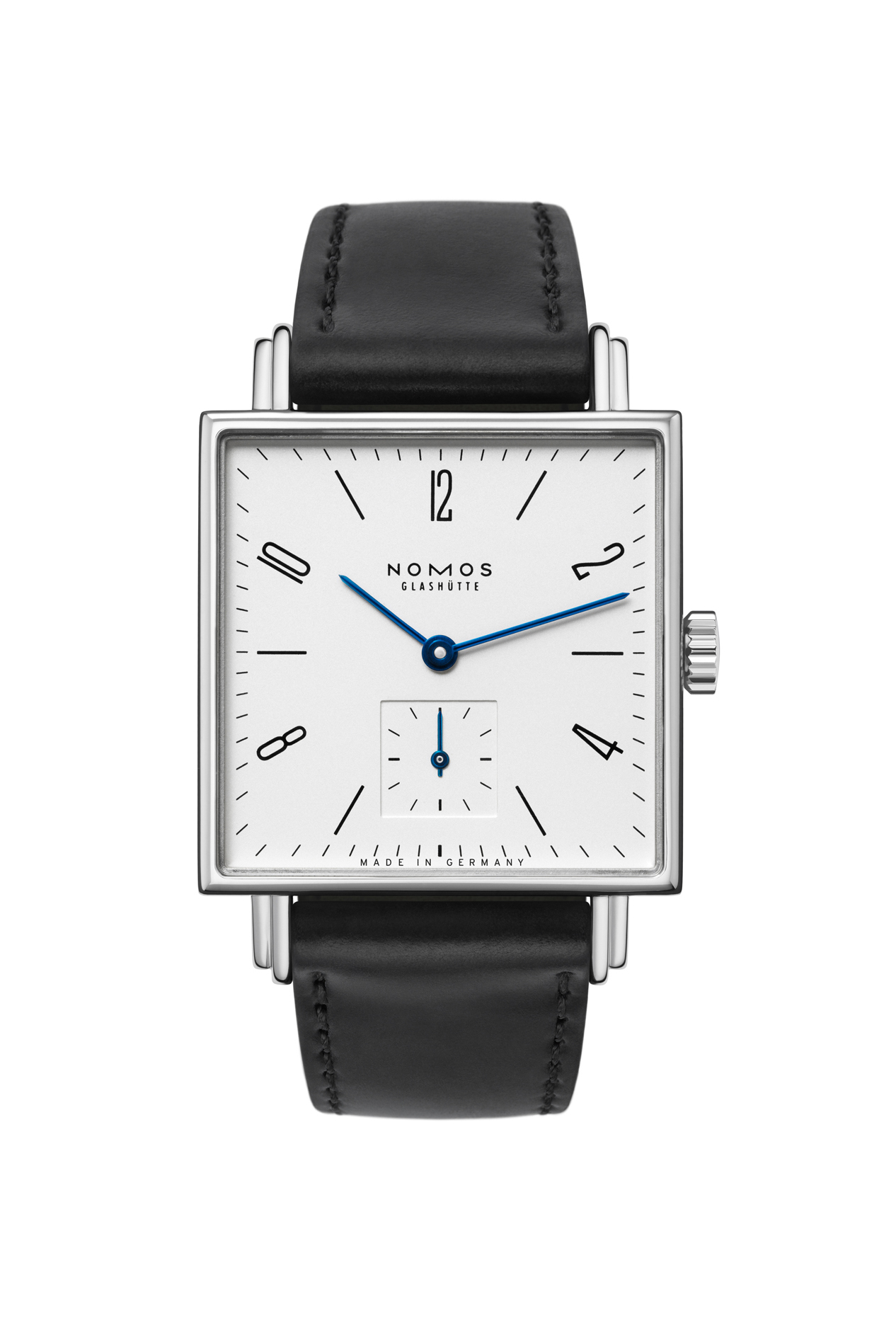
Tetra
- Tangente (1992): originally hand-wound with optional date function, power reserve indicator, white or champagne-colored dial, in 33, 35, 38, 39, and 41 mm diameter; also available as a limited edition for Doctors Without Borders in the UK, USA, and Germany.
- Tetra (1992): hand-wound with optional automatic winding, power reserve indicator, various dial colors, square in 27, 29.5, and 33 mm diameter; also available as a special edition for Doctors Without Borders in Germany.
- Orion (1992): hand-wound with optional automatic winding, date function, various dial colors, in 33, 35, 38, 39, and 41 mm diameter.
- Ludwig (1992): hand-wound with optional automatic winding, date function, white or champagner dial, in 33, 35, 38, and 41 mm diameter, Roman numerals.
- Tangomat (2005): automatic in 38 mm diameter with optional date function, white or dark-colored dial, NOMOS Xi movement, and world time function.
- Club (2007): hand-wound with optional automatic winding, date function, white or dark-colored dial, in 36, 38, and 40 mm diameter
- Zurich (2009): automatic in 40 mm diameter with optional date function, various dial colors, and world time function
- Ahoi (2013): automatic, 36 or 40 mm in diameter with water-resistance to 20 atm, optional date function, and various dial color options
- Lux (2013): hand-wound shape watch in 18 kt white or rose gold, various dial colors, in two sizes: 40.5 × 36 mm and 38.5 × 34 mm
- Lambda (2013): hand-wound watch in 18 kt white or rose gold and limited edition stainless steel; black, deep blue or off-white dial, in two sizes: 39 and 42 mm diameter. In 2020, Lambda reference 960.S1 was introduced as a limited edition of 175 pieces celebrating the 175th anniversary of watchmaking in the town of Glashuette.
- Metro (2014): hand-wound in 35, 37, 38, or 39 mm diameter with date, power reserve indicator, and various dial color options
- Minimatik (2015): automatic in 35.5 mm diameter, available in white, champagne, or midnight blue
- Autobahn (2018): automatic in 41 mm diameter with date function, superluminova on the dial, and three dial color options

== Calibers ==
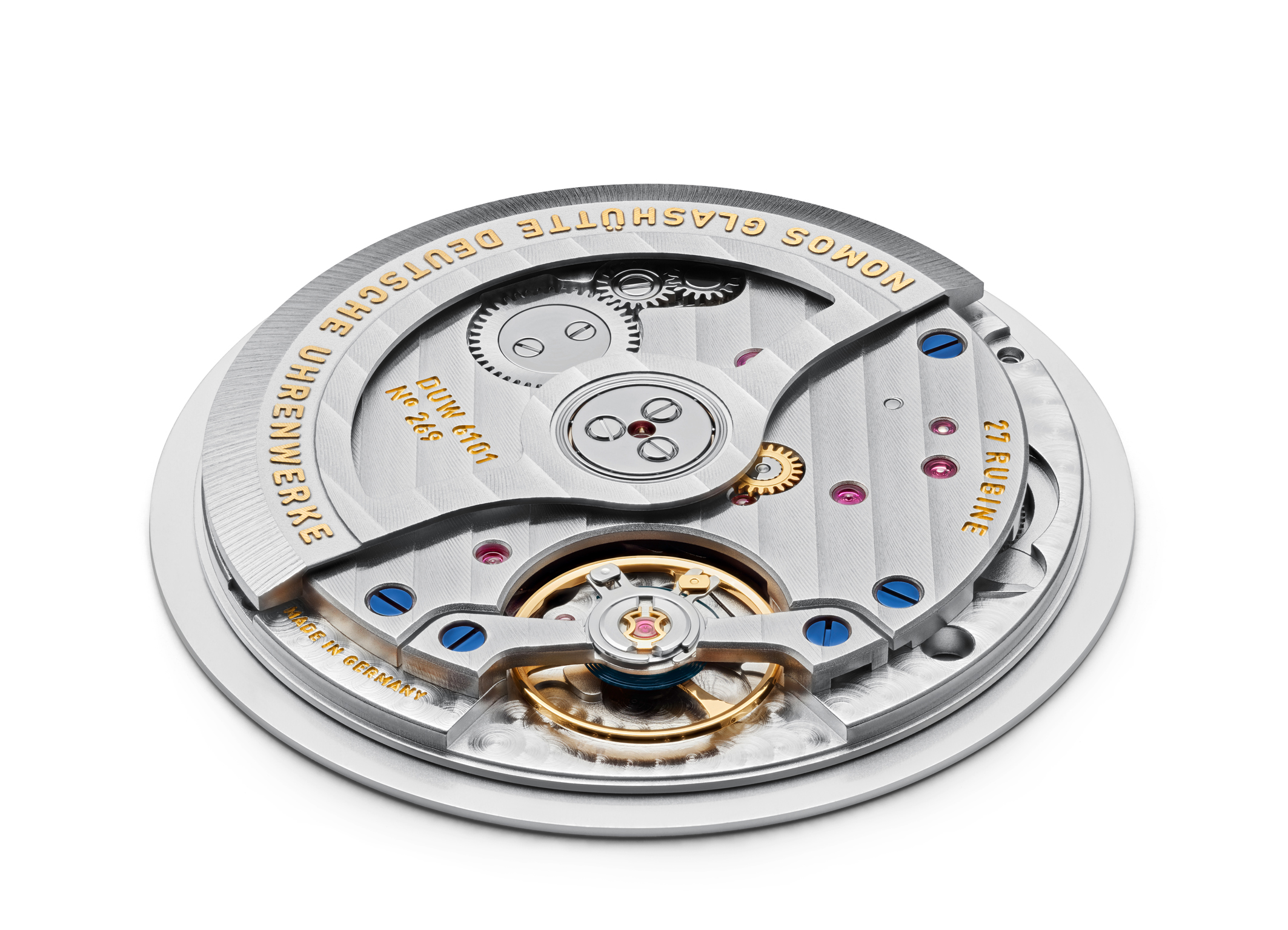
The neomatik date caliber, DUW 6101

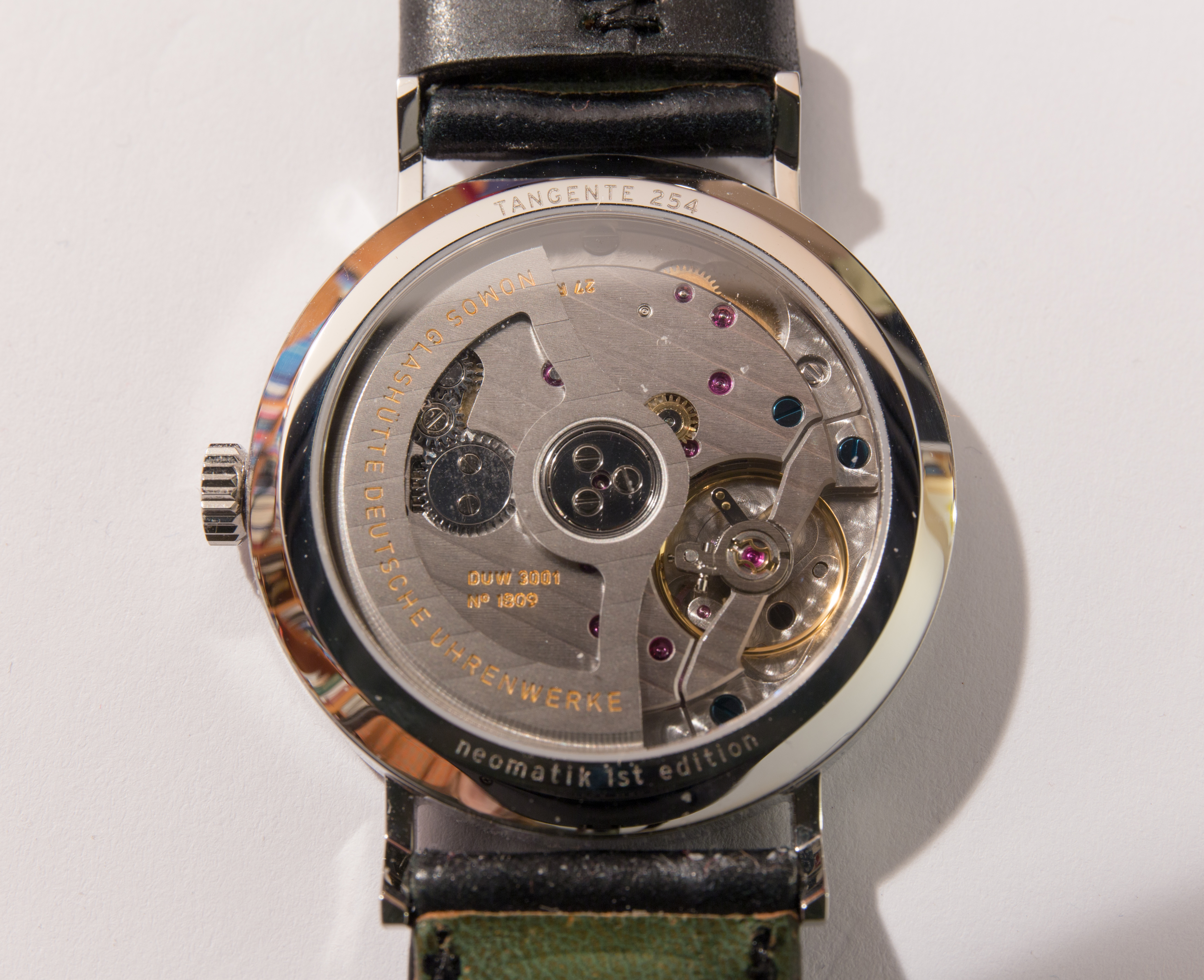
The neomatik caliber, DUW 3001

NOMOS Glashütte owns multiple patents for their calibers, such as for the in-house date mechanism, power reserve display and for the proprietary escapement, the NOMOS swing system. NOMOS Glashütte currently produces eleven in-house calibers with various complications. These are:

=== Manual ===
- α (Alpha), 43-hour power reserve / Alpha.2 (found in the duo series), with a shorter pivot on the second wheel
- DUW 1001, power reserve indicator, 84-hour power reserve, Jewels: 29, Frequency: 21600.
- DUW 2002, tonneau shape, 84-hour power reserve
- DUW 4101, NOMOS swing system, date indicator, 42-hour power reserve
- DUW 4301, NOMOS swing system, power reserve indicator, 43-hour power reserve
- DUW 4401, NOMOS swing system, power reserve indicator, date indicator, 42-hour power reserve

=== Automatic ===
- neomatik DUW 3001, NOMOS swing system, 42-hour power reserve
- DUW 5001, NOMOS swing system, 43-hour power reserve
- DUW 5101, NOMOS swing system, date indicator, 42-hour power reserve
- DUW 5201, NOMOS swing system, worldtimer function, 24-hour indicator, 42-hour power reserve
- neomatik date DUW 6101, NOMOS swing system, date indicator, 42-hour power reserve

The NOMOS Glashütte movements have a Glashütte three-quarter plate, are rhodium-plated and refined with Glashütte ribbing and NOMOS perlage. Further special features include: stop-seconds mechanism, fine adjustment in six positions, Glashütte-style NOMOS stopwork, tempered blue screws, sunburst finish on the ratchet and crown wheel. Additional features of the movements DUW 1001 and 2002: swan neck fine adjustment, hand-engraved balance cock, screwed gold chatons, 84-hour power reserve, twin mainspring barrel, screw balance.

== Awards ==
NOMOS watches have won more than 150 design awards as of 2018 including the iF Design Award, the Good Design Award, the red dot Design Award, and the German Design Award. In 2018, NOMOS Glashütte became the first non-Swiss brand after A. Lange & Söhne to win the Grand Prix d’Horlogerie de Genève (GPHG), the Oscars of the watchmaking world, with the Tangente Update model - which has also been awarded the European Product Design Award (EPDA).

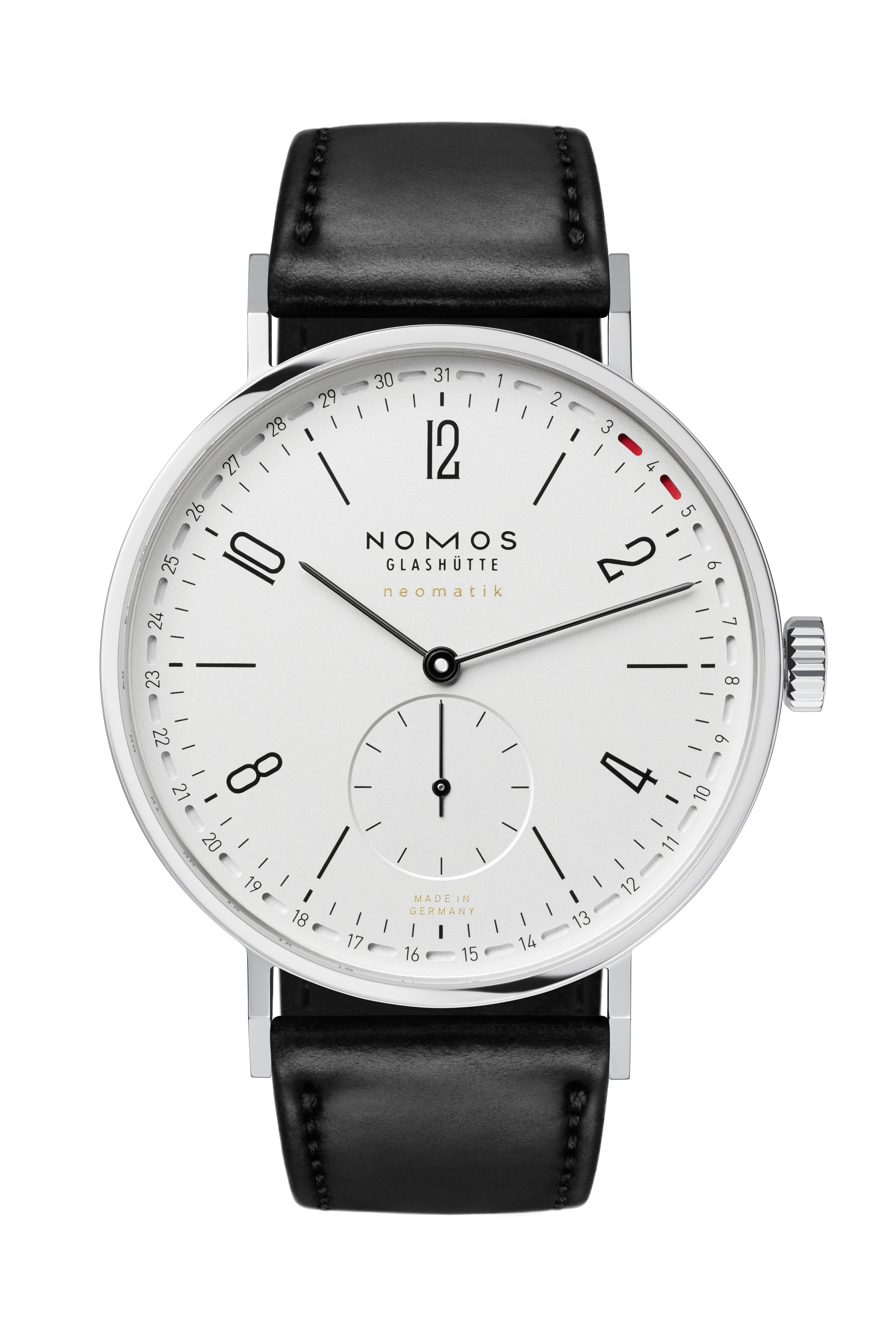
Tangente Update has won the GPHG, iF Design Award, and EPDA.

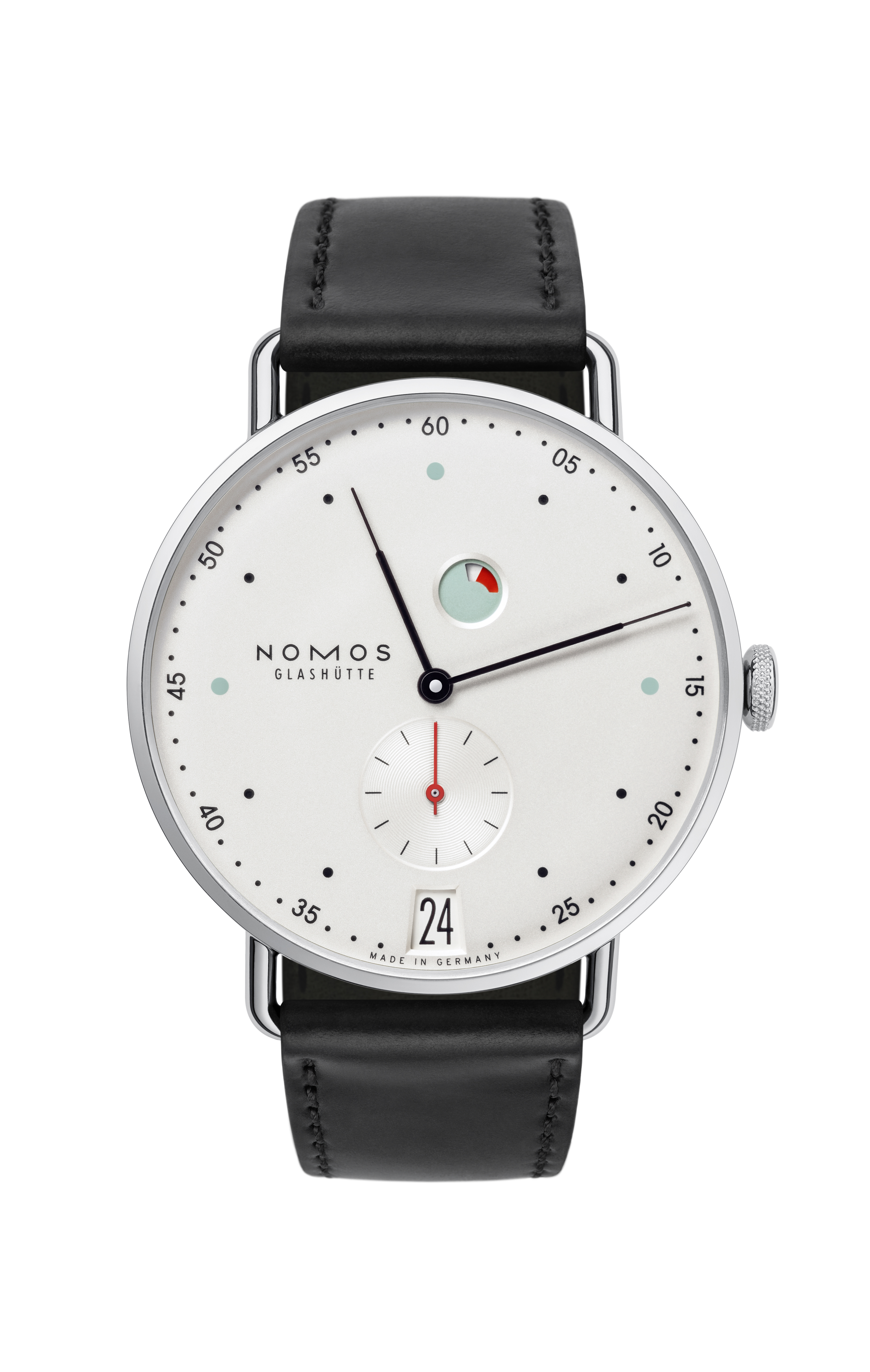
The German Design Award 2018 was the sixth prize awarded to the model Metro, released in 2014.

== See also ==
- List of German watch manufacturers
