= Bianchet =

Swiss luxury watchmaking company

- Industry: Watchmaking
- Founded: 2017; 9 years ago
- Founder: Rodolfo Festa Bianchet, Emmanuelle Girodet Festa Bianchet
- Headquarters: Switzerland
- Products: Watches
- Website: bianchet.com

Bianchet is a Swiss luxury watchmaking company specialising in tourbillon timepieces, whose movements are developed and hand-finished in-house.

== Overview ==
Bianchet was founded by husband and wife Rodolfo Festa Bianchet and Emmanuelle Festa Bianchet in 2017 when Rodolfo was a successful entrepreneur in the Fintech sector, and Emmanuelle Festa Bianchet was a journalist and artist.

Bianchet is the first watchmaking company to have developed its entire watch movement architecture and watch cases using the golden ratio of 1.618 and the Fibonacci sequence as a design basis. It is also the first company to have developed a tonneau-shaped watch in carbon capable of resisting a pressure of 10ATM or 100 meters of water depth, for which the company uses a proprietary high-density carbon composite infused with titanium dust. Bianchet pioneered the integration of a full-carbon bracelet into a tonneau-shaped watch with the UltraFino Carbon.

After founding the company in 2017, Bianchet presented its prototype at Baselworld in 2019. Two years later, the company released its first watch, the Tourbillon B 1.618 Openwork, at the Geneva Watch Days and participated in the Grand Prix D'Horlogerie de Genève. The same year, Bianchet opened its first showroom in Neuchâtel, Switzerland. In 2022, Bianchet presented the Tourbillon B 1.618 new limited editions at the Geneva Watch Days. As of 2023, Bianchet is an Associated Brand of the Geneva Watch Days, and its timepieces are distributed in 22 countries.

== Watch Releases & Awards ==
Bianchet won a Swiss Watch award in October 2023 as its Flying Tourbillon Grande Date has been named the Best Start-Up Watch at the Temporis International Awards in Zurich. The watch was selected by a jury of industry experts from across the world, including notable watchmakers Philippe Dufour, Kari Voutilainen, and Romain Gauthier, along with specialist journalists, retailers, and influencers.

On the occasion of Geneva Watch Week 2024, Bianchet introduced its Flying Tourbillon Sport GMT, which allows simultaneous reading of two time zones. Equipped with an in-house titanium flying tourbillon, the watch movement is adorned with a rotating Earth dome synchronised with the hour hand.

In February 2025, Bianchet introduced the B 1.618 UltraFino, a tonneau-shaped timepiece with an integrated bracelet in titanium, which marks an evolution in the integrated sport tonneau watch. This model, available in a skeleton and dial version, features a 8.9 mm slim tonneau case in titanium with a curvature of 1.2 mm. The watch made its debut during the Geneva Watch Week events. Alongside this launch, Bianchet introduced its first automatic tourbillon movement crafted from titanium —the Ultra-thin caliber UT01 measuring 3.85 mm in height with a tourbillon cage of 2.66 mm—marking a significant milestone in the brand’s horological history. Both the watch and movement are designed using the mathematical principles of Golden Ratio (1.618), such as the gold rotor which represents 12 interlacing Fibonacci spirals, and the back bridges of the movement which form concentric Golden Circles, with the objective of obtaining aesthetic harmony. In March 2025, Bianchet introduced the UltraFino Carbon, the first tonneau-watch with an integrated carbon bracelet. The watch is crafted from high-density carbon and weighs 62 grams with a monobloc carbon architecture. Despite its 8.9mm slim case, it can resist shocks of 5000G and 5ATM of water pressure.

Bianchet made its debut at Watches and Wonders Geneva in April 2026, unveiling the UltraFino Rotondo, the brand’s first round-case timepiece. The watch features a 39.5 mm diameter case measuring 8.9 mm in thickness, available in grade 5 titanium, carbon, and rose gold, and is water-resistant to 100 metres with shock resistance tested to 5,000G. It is powered by the proprietary automatic flying tourbillon calibre UR01, developed in titanium with a gold rotor, which operates at 21,600 vibrations per hour and offers a 60-hour power reserve. Also unveiled at Watches and Wonders 2026 was the UltraFino Maserati.

== Materials and Technology ==
Bianchet combines noble and high-tech materials in both its watch cases and movements. Among these is the Titanium-Dust-High-Density-Carbon, a composite developed specifically for the brand. This material consists of 500 ultra-thin layers of 0.03mm carbon fibre, with titanium powder infused between every two layers, creating a light and durable material.

The brand is also known for blending technical and precious materials, such as gold with carbon or sapphire with rubber. In July 2024, Bianchet introduced the hybrid-gold versions of its Grande Date and Sport GMT models, featuring the fusion of carbon, gold, rubber, and titanium. A month later, the brand unveiled its first sapphire timepiece, pioneering the integration of rubber gaskets within a sapphire watch case.

In 2026, Bianchet introduced a further proprietary material: a white quartz-fibre composite developed for the UltraFino Monaco limited edition, created in partnership with Team Monaco for the E1 Series Championship. The composite is derived from ultra-pure silica fibres and natural quartz, originally engineered for high-performance industrial and aerospace applications. It offers high mechanical strength, scratch and shock resistance, and reduced weight, while its white coloration references the Principality of Monaco’s livery.

== Movements ==
Bianchet is specialised in the creation of tourbillon watches. The brand designs and develops its own flying tourbillon movements in-house. Each movement is entirely made in Switzerland, crafted from titanium, finished by hand and assembled at the Bianchet atelier in La Chaux-de-Fonds.

In February 2025, Bianchet introduced its first automatic flying tourbillon movement, the Ultra-thin caliber UT01, measuring 3.85 mm in thickness and weighing 8 grams, with a tourbillon cage standing at 2.66 mm in height, one of the thinnest and lightest automatic tourbillon movements in existence. To achieve this ultra-flat architecture, Bianchet developed a suspended barrel and engineered a new escapement stacking solution, allowing high functional safety margins and ensuring shock absorption of up to 5000Gs. The movement also features a proprietary winding and time-setting system meant to improve energy transfer and ease of use.

In April 2026, Bianchet introduced the UR01 calibre, its first automatic flying tourbillon movement developed for a round case. Derived from the existing UT01 architecture but re-engineered for circular geometry, the UR01 applies the same founding design principles: the Golden Ratio (1.618) governs the architecture of the movement, the geometry of the bridges on the main plate, and the structure of the oscillating rotor, which is shaped with 12 interlacing Fibonacci spirals, mirroring the design language established in the UT01. The movement is arranged on a vertical axis of symmetry, with the mainspring barrel at 12 o’clock and the flying tourbillon at 6 o’clock. The UR01 operates at 21,600 vibrations per hour, delivers a 60-hour power reserve, and measures 3.85 mm in thickness, weighing under 8 grams. It is crafted from grade 5 titanium, with a solid 18k rose gold rotor, and hand-finished at the Bianchet atelier in La Chaux-de-Fonds.

== Sponsorships and Ambassadors ==
In June 2022, Bianchet became the first official watch and timing partner of the Polo Rider Cup in Chantilly. Bianchet continued to be the official watch and timing partner in 2023 in Saint-Tropez.

Since 2022, Bianchet has been a business partner with Big Blue Ocean. Both organisations contribute to cleaning oceans, protecting vulnerable marine animals, and providing free educational resources.

In 2023, 2024 and 2025, Bianchet signed several public figures as its brand ambassadors, including Formula 1 Driver Esteban Ocon, professional tennis players Grigor Dimitrov, and Alexander Bublik, big wave surfer Francisco Porcella, Formula E Driver Maximilian Gunther, and racing driver Stefano Costantini.

In 2024, Bianchet became the Official Timekeeping Partner of Formula E team Maserati MSG Racing. The partnership was inaugurated with a limited edition of the brand's signature Flying Tourbillon B 1.618 Grande Date in collaboration with the racing team; the launch happened during 2024 Monaco ePrix.

In 2026, Bianchet became the Official Watch Sponsor of Team Monaco, which competes in the E1 Series World Electric Powerboat Championship under the patronage of the Prince Albert II of Monaco Foundation. The partnership was marked by the release of the UltraFino Monaco, a limited edition of 98 pieces — a number referencing Monaco’s international code — crafted in a resistant lightweight quartz-fibre composite case and dressed in the Principality’s red and white colours.

Following Maserati’s withdrawal from Formula E after Season 11 in July 2025, Bianchet established a new collaboration directly with Maserati, launching the UltraFino Maserati Flying Tourbillon, a limited edition of 100 individually numbered pieces unveiled at Watches and Wonders Geneva 2026. The watch was created to mark the centenary of the Maserati Trident emblem, which first appeared on the Tipo 26 at the 1926 Targa Florio. Powered by the in-house UT01 calibre, the watch features a high-density carbon case with design references to the Maserati MCPURA supercar, including an open-worked dial mirroring the car’s wheel architecture and an AI Aqua Rainbow finish.
