= Philippe Dufour =

Swiss inventor and watchmaker (born 1948)

- Born: 1948 (age 77–78)
- Occupation: Watchmaker
- Years active: 1967-present
- Known for: Swiss luxury watches

Philippe Dufour, AHCI (born 1948) is a Swiss-born watchmaker from Le Sentier, Vallée de Joux. He is regarded as a master of modern watchmaking, and his watches are referred as among the best ever made. He finishes all of his watches himself by hand. In 1992, Dufour was the first watchmaker to put arguably the most complex of complications in a wristwatch, a Sonnerie. His other two models include Duality and Simplicity.

== Education ==
At the age of 15, Dufour decided to choose a profession rather than pursuing academics. Upon his decision to study mechanics, he got his first training at the Ecole d’Horlogerie de la Vallée de Joux and graduated in 1967.

== Career ==
Following the completion of his studies, he was hired by Jaeger-LeCoultre in 1967. After working for several companies, Audemars Piguet ordered 5 Sonnerie movements for pocket watches from Dufour and he started to work on the project in 1982. The last movement was delivered in 1988. After finishing the order, he set out to become one of the first independent watchmakers and presented his first wristwatch in his own name in the Basel World fair in 1992. Following the world's first Sonnerie wristwatch, he developed the Duality in 1996. The principle of the watch was based on the differential system that averages errors between two balance wheels. Only 9 pieces were made.

In 2000, he introduced his most famous model: Simplicity. The model was the only current production watch from Dufour and about 200 were planned to be produced. He was reportedly overwhelmed by orders and is not taking more.

One of his Simplicity watches is exhibited at The Espace Horloger watch museum at Switzerland.

== Auctions and collectability ==
In 2016, Phillips sold one for €260,000. In 2017, Sotheby's sold one for €176,000. In that same year, Phillips sold one for €192,500.

One of the 9 Duality models ever produced was sold in 2017 at New York by Phillips for almost US$1,000,000.

In 2020, a special edition of the Simplicity marking its 20th anniversary and personally offered by Dufour himself was sold for a record US$1.512 million at a Phillips auction in Geneva, becoming one of the most expensive watches ever sold at auction.

In 2021, the first version of the Grande et Petite Sonnerie №1 was sold for a world record of US$5.210 million at a Phillips auction in Geneva, becoming the most expensive timepiece made by an independent watchmaker or brand sold at auction.

== Personal collection ==
Other than his own creations, Dufour is also a known collector of vintage watches. In an interview during SIHH 2016 he stated: "Datograph is the only neutral watch I bought for myself", a timepiece from A. Lange & Söhne. In an interview with watch industry publication Hodinkee, he stated: "The best chronograph ever made is the Datograph".

At Baselworld 2019, he was seen wearing a Rolex GMT Master II ref. 126710.

== Film ==
Philippe Dufour features in the documentary feature film Making Time], which also features Maximilian Büsser, Aldis Hodge, Ludovic Ballouard and Nico Cox.
