= Büsser =

Büsser is a surname. Notable people with name include:

- Carlos Büsser (1928–2012), Argentine naval officer
- Eduard Büsser (1899–1949), Swiss painter
- Henri Büsser (1872–1973), French classical composer, organist, and conductor
- Josef Büsser (1896–1952), Swiss painter, sculptor and art teacher
- Karl Büsser, Swiss sidecarcross passenger
- Maximilian Büsser, Swiss businessman and founder of watch brand Maximilian Büsser and Friends

== See also ==
- busser
- Jari De Busser (born 1999), Belgian footballer
- Theun Busser (born 1952), Dutch speed skater
