= Hm3 =

HM3 can refer to:

- Hannah Montana 3, a soundtrack for the Hannah Montana TV series
- United States Navy Hospital Corpsman, Third Class (E-4)
- A Human Genome Organisation symbol for muscarinic acetylcholine receptor M3
- One of the implementations of Modula-3
- Horological Machine No.3, a timepiece from MB&F

hm³ can refer to:

- Cubic hectometre
