= Rolex Land-Dweller =

Wristwatch manufactured by Rolex

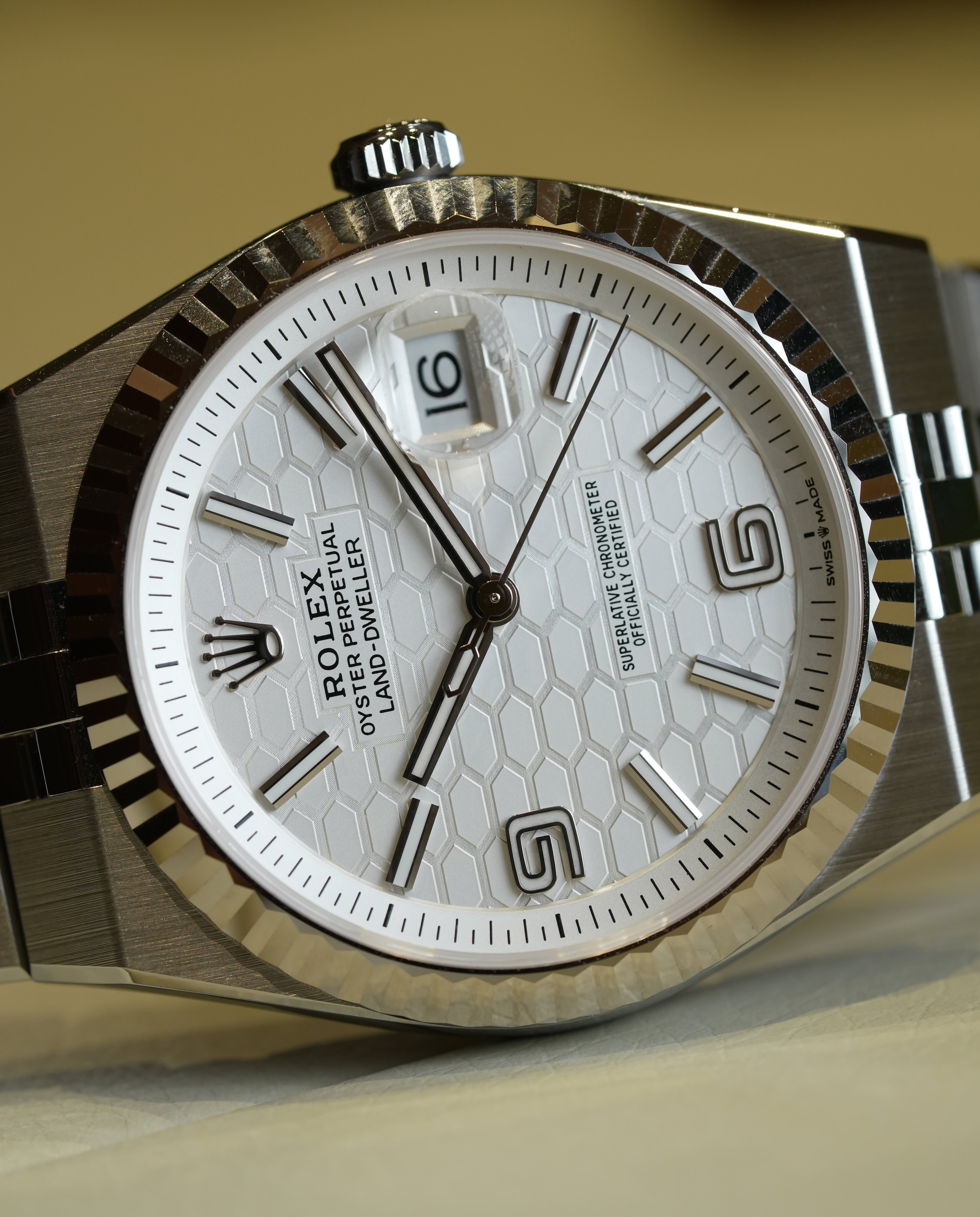
- Rolex Land-Dweller Ref. 127334 in Oystersteel and White Gold
- Manufacturer: Rolex
- Type: Automatic
- Display: Analogue
- Introduced: 2025

The Rolex Land-Dweller is a line of sports watches developed by manufactured by Rolex.

Inspired by the Rolex Oysterquartz, it was introduced in 2025 as an entirely new model line, it has been described as the brand's "most important new model in decades".

== History ==
Development of the Land-Dweller came five years before its launch, following a brief from Rolex's management for a modern watch positioned alongside the Sea-Dweller and Sky-Dweller. Its design drew inspiration from the integrated-bracelet construction of the Rolex reference 5100, introduced in 1969, although Rolex stated that the model was not intended as a revival of the watch.

In 2023, Rolex trademarked the name 'Land-Dweller', alongside the name 'Coast-Dweller' in the United States. in April 2025, the watch was revealed at Watches and Wonders, featuring an integrated bracelet design and brand new movement with a novel 'Dynapulse' escapement.

== Movement ==
The Land-Dweller introduced Rolex's new Dynapulse escapement. The mechanism uses two silicon distribution wheels and an impulse rocker to transmit energy to the oscillator, reducing friction and improving energy efficiency compared to a conventional Swiss lever escapement.
