= Memovox =

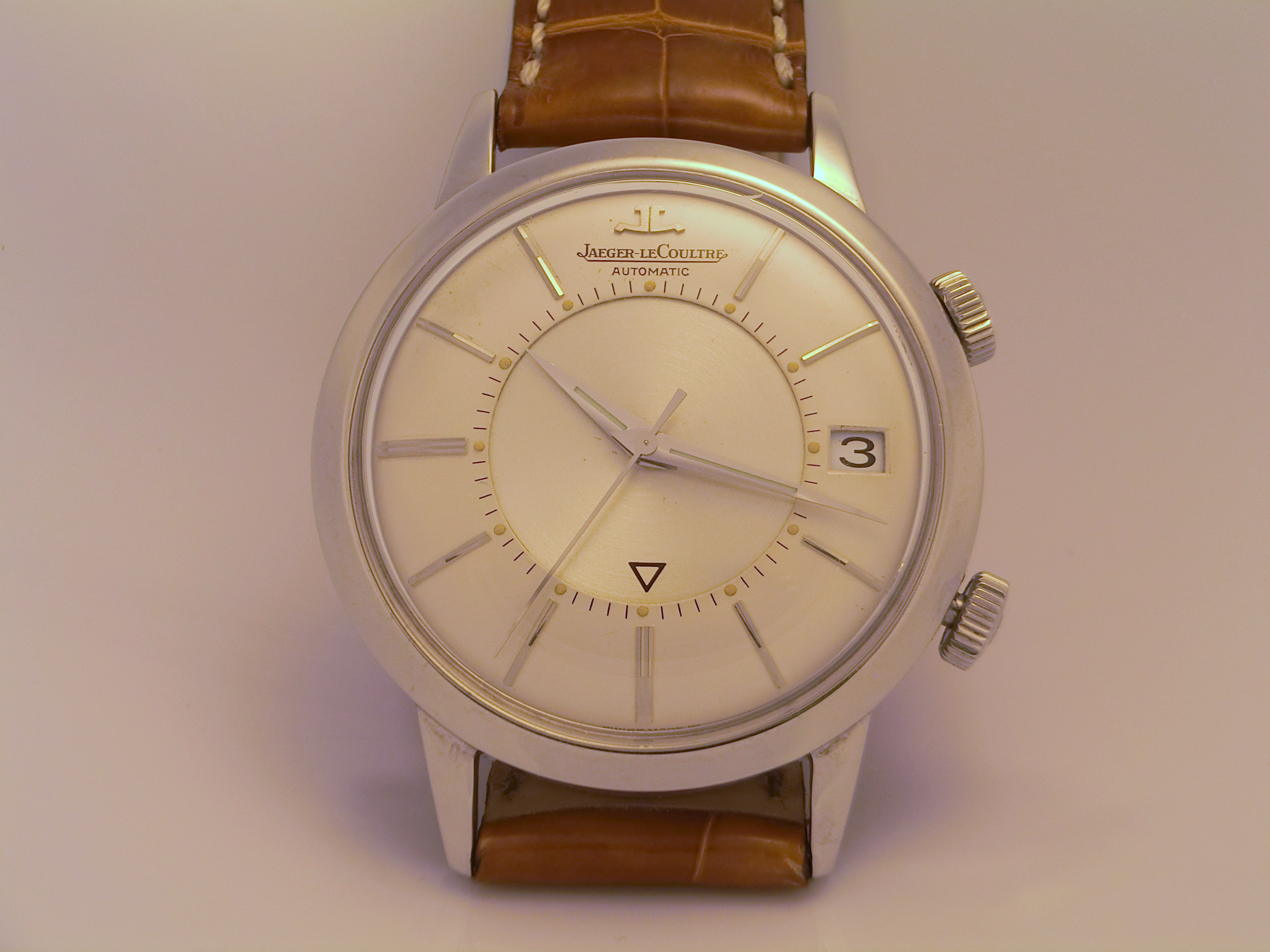
Memovox model E855 with calibre K825

Memovox (portmanteau from lat. memoria 'memory' and vox 'voice') refers to a model series of mechanical wristwatches with alarm function of the Swiss watch manufacturer Jaeger-LeCoultre.

== History ==
In 1951, Jaeger-LeCoultre's first alarm wristwatch was released under the name Memovox. The company Vulcain had already produced the world's first alarm wristwatch named cricket in 1949. These first Memovox models were equipped with the watch calibres K489, K489/1 or K601, which were wound manually. The K601 also referred to a later quartz movement by Jaeger-LeCoultre.

The time and alarm function were separated by constructing two separate barrels which ensured that the power reserve of the clock was not reduced by triggering the alarm function. As a result, Memovox watches had two crowns for winding. Memovox watches were also sold with Logo on the dial and bridge engraving by Cartier, Gübelin (here under the name Ipsovox), Dunhill and Van Cleef & Arpels. From 1955 on, Memovoxes were also available equipped with the caliber K814 which had a date display.

Due to the Smoot-Hawley Tariff Act, the Memovox models for the American market were printed and engraved with LeCoultre instead of Jaeger-LeCoultre until 1980. The calibers for the American market were encased in the USA in watch cases that were locally produced. Accordingly, the dials and case shapes used in the US models differ from the european ones. An exception were the case bottoms made of stainless steel, which were always engraved on the inside with LeCoultre on both European and US Memovox watches. The Memovoxes in North America were distributed by the company Vacheron-Constantin-LeCoultre, a subsidiary of Longines-Wittnauer.

== Automatic alarm wristwatch ==
In 1956 Jaeger-LeCoultre launched the K815 caliber, the world's first automatic alarm wristwatch, the Memovox Automatic. The automatic winding of this watch had a pendulum, which rotated in an angle of about 110 °, It was limited by two springs and stored the energy in the barrel for the time function.

For the company's 125th anniversary, the Memovox Parking was sold in 1958, with the central alarm disc on the dial printed with markings to set the parking time. At the same time the Memovox World Time was offered, with the time zones printed on the dial - it could therefore be used to calculate the time in other time zones.

== Automatic alarm wristwatch for divers ==
In 1959, the Deep Sea Alarm Automatic (reference number E857), the world's first diver's watch with an alarm function was developed, containing the K815 caliber. This watch had a non-rotatable bezel.

== Automatic alarm wristwatch with date indication ==
Also in 1959, the Memovox Automatic (model E855) received a date display with the automatic caliber K825. This calibre consisted of 241 individual parts and was built in a quantity of about 45,000 over the course of ten years. The K825 was used in the models of the E855, the E859 (also referred to as Polaris, in two versions of 1965 and 1968), and the E861.

The watch cases of the European version of the E855 were manufactured in stainless steel, in 14 carat yellow gold with stainless steel back, in 18 carat yellow gold and in 18 carat red gold. The dials of the European E855 existed in silvery-white, black, gold-colored (only in cases of gold), red or lapis lazuli-like printing. The indices of the European E855 appeared in alternating forms over the ten years in following order: short and thin, long and thin, rectangular with three broad stripes, short with black middle line (French ébène for 'ebony'), or short without a middle line. The first form of the indices of the European E855 came with attached Arabic numerals "12" instead of the "JL" logo on later models. The last two forms of the indices came with an attached triangle on the central alarm disc of the clock to indicate the alarm, while in the earlier models the triangle was painted on the alarm indication disc. The first two forms of the indices were offered with watch hands in dauphine form, the last three, however, with bâton hands. Only the E855 model of the European version with white dial was made with all the aforementioned forms of indices.

The K825 was also made in Jaeger-LeCoultre E855 watches for Alfred Dunhill and Gübelin (here under the name Ipsovox). The pendulum of these models was engraved with the names of these companies (instead of Jaeger-LeCoultre), the dials were printed accordingly and provided with according logo. The US version of the E855 was also offered with the logo on the dial by Brooks Brothers.

The E861 still possessed the caliber K825, as the last clock model. The watch case of the E861, being equipped with the following caliber K916 and new dials, was reused in the later model E873.

== Automatic wristwatch with date for divers ==
Sold from 1965 and named Polaris, the model E859 was a diver's watch with internal rotating bezel, for which the watch had a third crown. The watch case was made of stainless steel had an enlarged diameter of 42 mm. This watch was offered in two editions (from 1965 and 1968) with different dials and hands. In both variants, a total of 1714 pieces were produced. The 1965 version had applied metal indices and dauphine hands, while the indices of the 1968 version were printed and featured bâton hands. An additional perforated nickel-plated brass case back with 16 holes improved the sound transmission of the alarm in the 1968 version to compensate for the sound dampening by the wrist and by water.

== Memovox Speed-beat ==
The calibre K916 was used from 1969 in Memovox models. This caliber was equipped with an increased balance spring with 28,800 beats per hour and was therefore called a speed-beat, compared to the K825 with 18,000 beats per hour. In addition, the K916 was equipped with a rotor mechanism that could utilize the full 360 ° in both directions to store mechanical energy in the barrel for the time function.

The K916 calibre was also available in a variety of watch cases: the E870 oval case with a rotating bezel, the E871 with a wide, rectangular case, the E872 with a rectangular case, the E873 with an oval case, the E874 and the E875 with a classic round case, the E876 with a pillow-shaped case and the Memovox Snowdrop E877 in a round monocoque build. All K916 cases (except the E874) were available in stainless steel, while the E873, the E875 and the E877 models were also available in 18 carat yellow gold. The models E861, E870 and E873 of European watches were printed on the dial with GT for Grande Taille 'Large Size while the American watches were printes with HPG for 'High Precision Guaranteed. The K916 was also used in watch cases from Girard-Perregaux with a corresponding rotor engraving and logo on the dial. These watches were sold by Girard-Perregaux (internal designation caliber GP 080) and also by Tiffany & Co. with their logo. Likewise, the K916 was sold with a differing logo and rotor engraving in watch cases made by Favre-Leuba under the name Memo Raider. In addition, models with manual winding and the calibre K911 were available from Jaeger-LeCoultre under the name Memodate, and at the same time in yellow gold cases made by Van Cleef & Arpels with a time zone bezel (model Traveler World Time) and with gold-plated case as well as by Hermès.

== Gong and perpetual calendar ==
Due to the quartz crisis, the caliber K916 and K911 were encased from 1969 to the late 1980s. On the occasion of the company's 150th anniversary in 1983, no special model of the Memovox was developed due to the crisis. For the 35th anniversary of the Memovox came in 1986, the Memovox Jubilee was released with K916 in yellow gold with a limited production number of 350 pieces.

It was not until 1989 that the next technical development was added with the Grand Réveil and the calibre K919. The K919, as the world's first caliber, had a wake-up function with a gong and a perpetual calendar with a four-digit year display and a moon phase display in addition to the time function with automatic winding. Through the gong, the "buzz" of the early Memovox models gave way to a "ringing" sound. The Grand Réveil was offered in yellow gold, red gold or platinum cases.

In 1994, the only ever Memovox and the world's first wrist alarm watch with a caseback made of sapphire crystal (with the hand- winding caliber K914) was released. In parallel with the K918 an alarm watch with automatic winding and gong was offered - not as Memovox, but as Master Reveil. Both calibres were encased in stainless steel or red gold cases and equipped with white or black dials.

== Vibration alarm ==
As a further development of the Grand Réveil, the Master Grande Memovox with K909 followed in 2003 and from 2006 the Master Grand Réveil was available with the calibre K909/1-440C and an additional silent vibration alarm. Both watch cases were offered in rose gold and platinum, the latter also in stainless steel.

The Memovox was fitted with the caliber K956 and encased in stainless steel or pink gold cases in 2003, and from 2004, the Amvox 1 was produced in stainless steel or titanium cases. This caliber was also used in the diver's watches Master Compressor Memovox (in stainless steel or red gold) and Master Compressor Extreme-W alarm (with a second time zone and stainless steel or titanium cases).

In 2008, on the occasion of the company's 175th anniversary, the Memovox International was released in stainless steel or rose gold cases, as well as the Tribute to Polaris 1965 in stainless steel or platinum, and the Tribute to Polaris 1968. In 2011, two versions of the Tribute to Deep Sea Alarm Automatic were released in stainless steel cases, based on the design the original EU and US versions.
