= Futurematic =

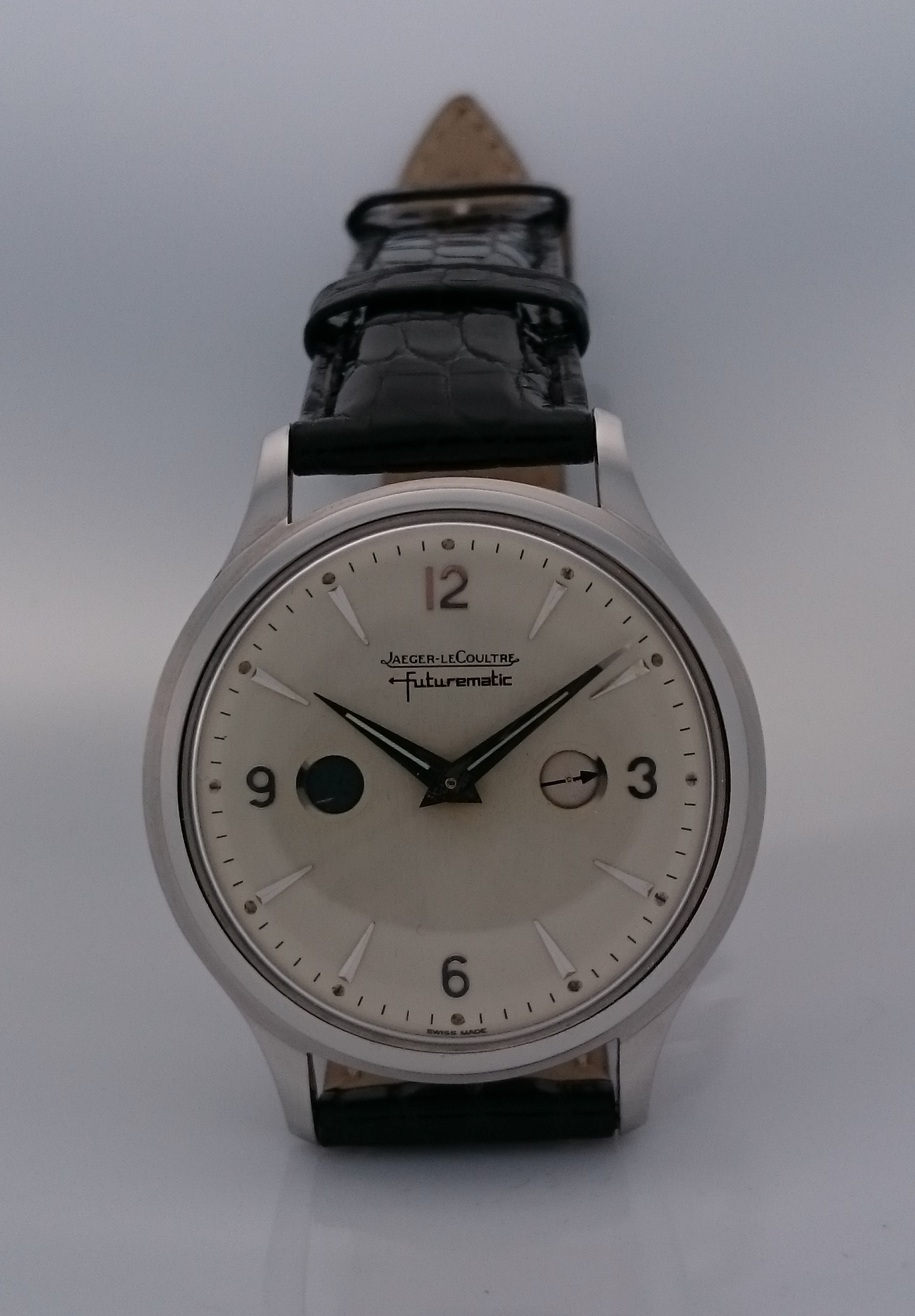
Futurematic E502 Porthole

The Futurematic is a self-winding wrist watch that was manufactured between 1951 and 1959 by the Swiss watch manufacturer Jaeger-LeCoultre. It was the world's first watch without a crown for winding the mainspring, instead having a flat crown on the back that was used solely for setting the time.

== Watch face ==
The Futurematic was produced with two different watch dials, both of which have a central time indicator for hours and minutes. The earlier dial had a small second indication and a power reserve indicator and was used in model E501; the later dial version, called Futurematic Porthole, had two portholes and was used in model E502. Below these portholes are rotating discs, one as a power reserve indicator with a colour change of red or blue (two variants, with the color indicating high reserve) to white (for low reserve); the other porthole had a disc with an arrow to indicate the seconds. The watch calibres K497, K497/1, or KP827 were used for the model E501, whereas the E502 contained K817, K817/1, or KP837.

== Movement features ==
All calibres contain a seconds hacking mechanism, which stops the watch when the crown is slid towards the centre, as well as a centrally suspended rotor for winding the mainspring and thus increasing the power reserve. The rotor swings bidirectionally through an angle of about 190°. All Futurematic calibres contain an antimagnetic and an enlarged and heavier (by about 20%) balance wheel, as well as a regulator for the balance spring with micrometre scaling and a unique wire hook mechanism to prevent overwinding of the mainspring. A complete unwinding of the mainspring was mechanically inhibited to allow the watch to start running shortly after putting it on the wrist. The last calibres of both models have Parachoc shock protection and therefore contain a "P" in the name, P827 and KP837, whereas the first calibres possess KIF shock protection. The comparably elaborate construction of the Futurematic was the base of the advertisement slogan at the time - "the most accurate self-winding watch in the world".

== Versions ==
Due to the Smoot–Hawley Tariff Act, the Futurematics for the U.S. market have a LeCoultre logo instead of Jaeger-LeCoultre printed on the dial and engraved on the calibre and the inside of the case back. As an exception to this rule, all case backs of U.S. and European Futurematic models are internally engraved with LeCoultre, whereas the other markings differ. The cases of the U.S. models and the dials which were produced in the U.S. encase a Swiss-made watch calibre engraved LeCoultre. The U.S. models were distributed by the company Vacheron-Constantin-LeCoultre, a subsidiary of Longines-Wittnauer. Therefore, there are differences in the case forms and the dials between the U.S. and the European models. While the European models had only two watch case forms and were produced in three metal variants (stainless steel, yellow gold, and red gold), there are more models of the U.S. Futurematics, and an additional case metal variant, 10 carat gold-filled stainless steel cases.

== Bibliography ==
- Franco Cologni, Douglas Kirkland and Maurizio Galimberti: Jaeger-LeCoultre. La Grande Maison. Éditions Flammarion, 2006, ISBN 9782080116130.
