= Hong Kong Watch & Clock Fair =

The Hong Kong Watch & Clock Fair is a timepiece trade show held annually in Hong Kong. It is organised by the Hong Kong Trade Development Council (HKTDC), Hong Kong Watch Manufacturers Association Limited., and The Federation of Hong Kong Watch Trades and Industries Ltd. The fair showcases both Hong Kong and international labels and also serves a platform for participants to exchange information and market intelligence. The five-day-long trade fair is opened every year in the beginning of September at the Hong Kong Convention and Exhibition Centre.

Special highlights of the fair include Brand Name Gallery, an attractive setting for fashionable timepieces by top brands, and Pageant of Eternity, designed to highlight the beauty and craftsmanship of watches at the high end of the spectrum.

The fair was established in 1982.

== Exhibit categories ==
- Brand Name Gallery (Brand Name Watches & Clocks)
- Complete Watches & Clocks
- Part & Components
- Machinery/ Equipment
- Packaging
- Trade Services

== See also ==
- Baselworld
- Watches & Wonders
