= Nico Cox =

American antiquarian horologist

Brittany Nicole Cox
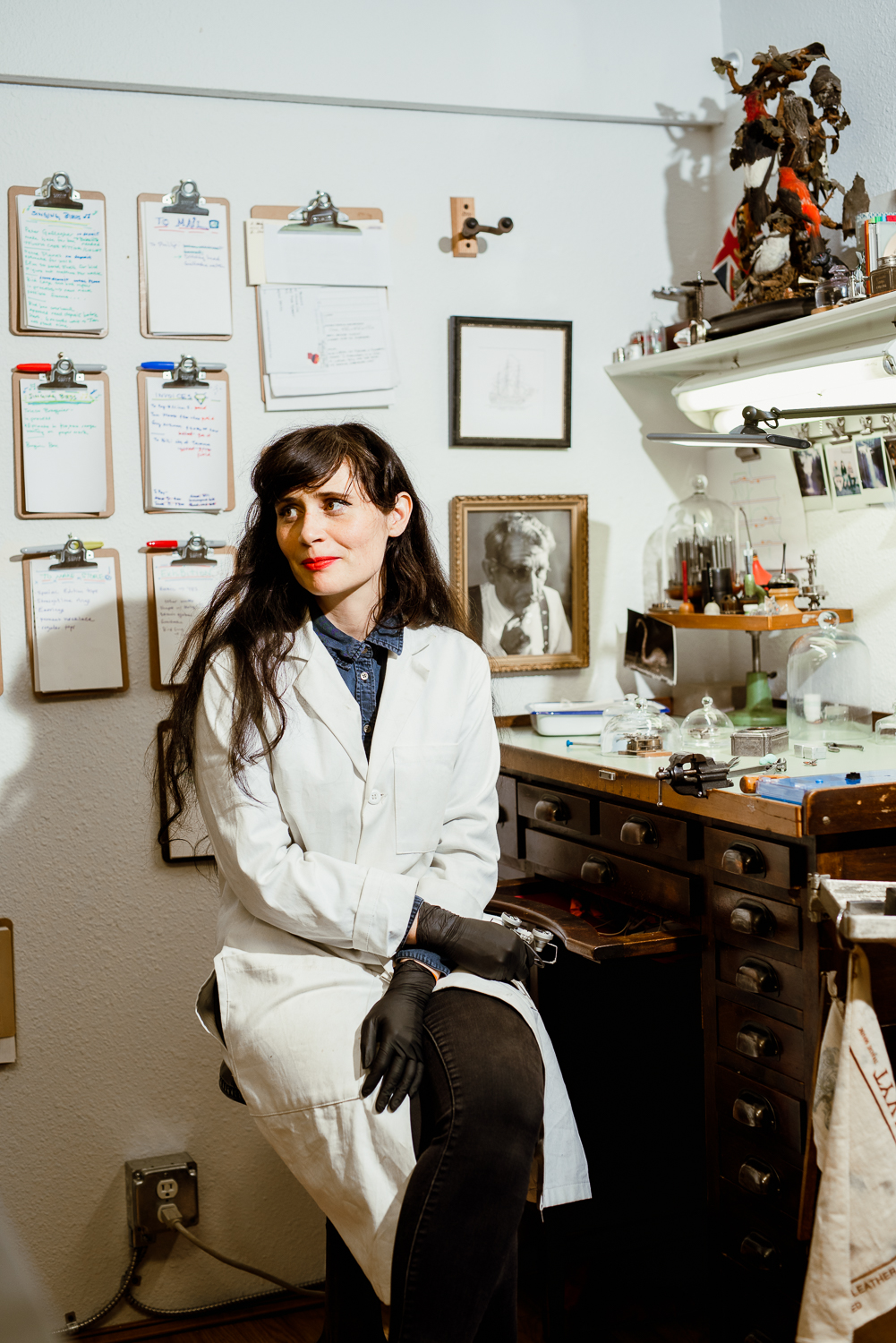
- Cox in her studio. Photo by Ben Lindbloom
- Born: Brittany Nicole Cox; San Antonio, Texas
- Occupation: Antiquarian horologist
- Website: mechanicalcurios.com

Brittany Nicole "Nico" Cox is an antiquarian horologist based in Seattle, Washington. She owns and operates a business called Memoria Technica. She specializes in the area of conservation and restoration of antique automata, mechanical music objects, complicated clocks and watches, and mechanical magic. She also creates original works inspired by the past. In the process of making her own creations, she utilizes many of the same skills and materials found in the objects she works on. In 2021, Cox was featured in National Geographic alongside a few of her regularly used antique tools.

== Education ==
Cox earned her bachelor's degree at the University of Texas, San Antonio in philosophy, focusing on metaphysics and epistemology. During this time, she learned about historical automata—philosophical tools used to analyze human intelligence, life, and the universe—leading her to pursue horology. She relocated to Seattle to attend the Watch Technology Institute at North Seattle College, where she received WOSTEP, CW21, SAWTA watchmaking certifications. She then continued her education at West Dean College in the United Kingdom, specializing in clock restoration and conservation, an area that is not taught in American schools. Cox graduated from West Dean College with a Conservation and Restoration of Clocks Diploma, Conservation of Clocks Post-Graduate Diploma, and a MA in Museum Studies.

== Awards ==
In 2012, Cox received the Antiquarian Horological Society Award for outstanding work done on a musical automaton ship. Along with the award, Cox was invited to share an in depth documentation of the work in the AHS's publication, Antiquarian Horology.

== Film ==
Cox features in the 2022 documentary feature film Making Time directed by Liz Unna, which also features Philippe Dufour, Aldis Hodge, Ludovic Ballouard, and Maximilian Büsser.
