= Maximilian Büsser =

21st-century Swiss entrepreneur

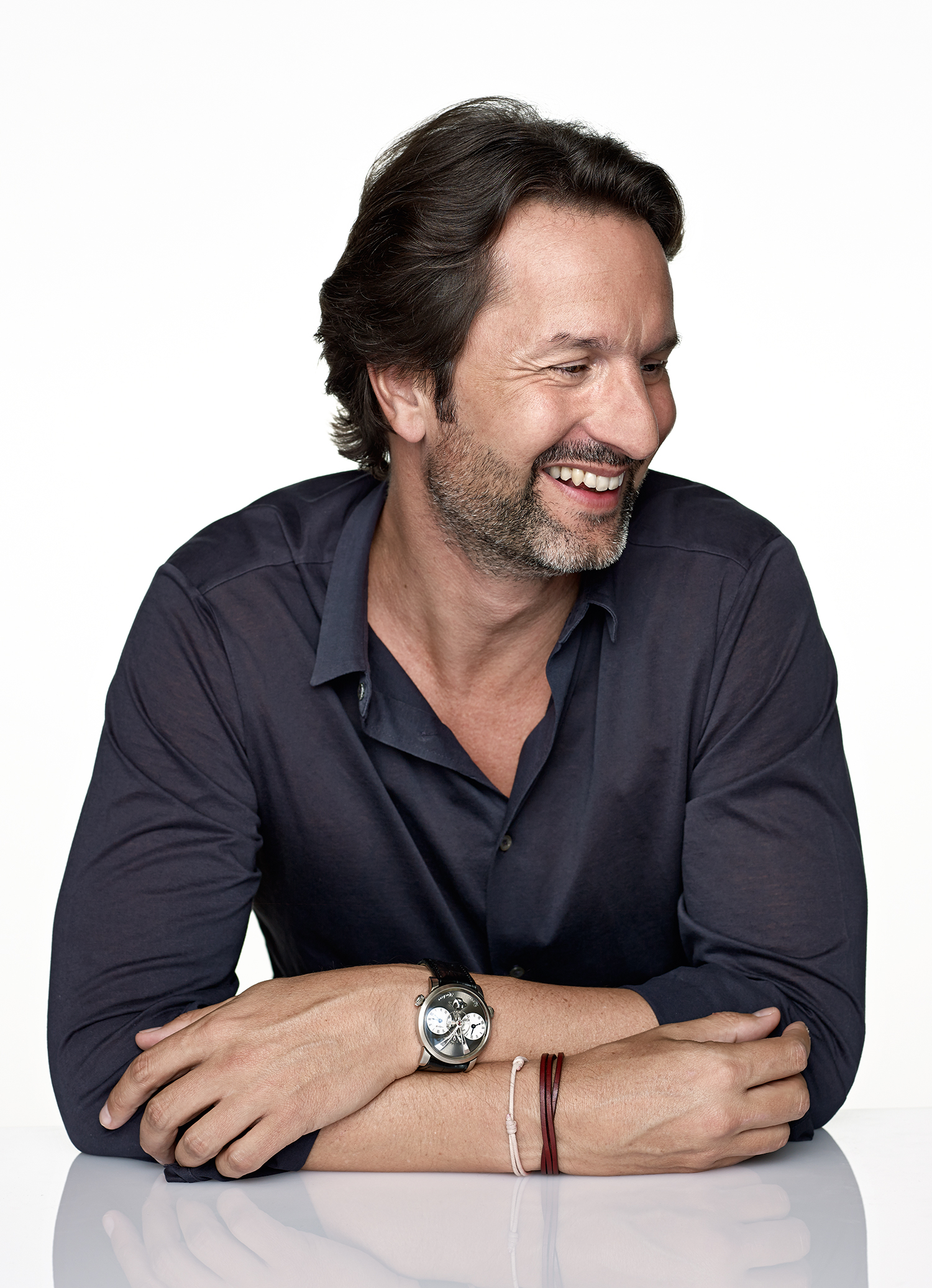
- Maximilian Büsser
- Occupations: 2005-present Founder, CEO and Chief Creative Officer of MB&F; 1998–2005 CEO of Harry Winston, Inc. Rare Timepieces; 1991–1998 Senior executive at Jaeger-LeCoultre

Maximilian Büsser is a Swiss businessman and founder of the watch brand MB&F. Prior to his work at MB&F he was the CEO of Harry Winston Rare Timepieces (1998–2005) and worked at Jaeger-LeCoultre (1991–1998). Büsser has lived in Dubai since 2014.

== Jaeger-LeCoultre (1991–1998) ==
Büsser studied engineering at EPFL and received his diploma in microtechnology in 1991. Büsser left university with the intention of working his way up the ranks of a large international company like Nestlé or Procter & Gamble, but was convinced to join the then relatively small Swiss watch brand Jaeger-LeCoultre, which was then struggling to rebuild after the Quartz crisis, by Henry-John Belmont, then CEO of Jaeger-LeCoultre, with the words, "Do you want to be one among 200,000 in a big corporation, or do you want to be among the four or five of us who can save this beautiful company?"

Büsser credits Belmont and Günther Bluemlein (who helped relaunch International Watch Company (IWC), Jaeger-LeCoultre, and A. Lange & Söhne as playing large roles in his early career development.

== Harry Winston Rare Timepieces (1998–2005) ==
In 1998 Büsser was headhunted from Jaeger-LeCoultre to become CEO of Harry Winston, Inc., based in Geneva. At the time, the firm was still controlled by the Winston family.

In his seven years at Harry Winston Rare Timepieces Büsser (bought by The Swatch Group in 2013) increased revenue from $8 million to $80 million and created the ground-breaking Opus series of ultra-complicated mechanical watches in collaboration with independent watchmakers.

== MB&F (2005–present) ==
While at Harry Winston, Inc. Rare Timepieces Büsser had developed concept-style watches for the Opus series, which motivated him to create his own brand and focus on creating three-dimensional kinetic art that he calls "Horological Machines".

Büsser's goal for MB&F (for Maximilian Büsser and Friends) is for the company to remain small enough not to require a middle layer of management, which Büsser feels is detrimental to creativity. To that end he has capped the head count at 20 people and sells his timepieces in the hundreds rather than the thousands, although the majority of the brand's watches sell for upwards of $50,000.

== M.A.D. Gallery ==
Büsser created the first MB&F M.A.D. Gallery in 2011 in Geneva, Switzerland. "M.A.D." stands for Mechanical Art Devices. Büsser considers his timepieces to be kinetic art and created his own art gallery to display his sculptured Horological Machines in the context of mechanical art by other artists.

In addition to Geneva, there are now M.A.D. Galleries in Dubai, Taipei and Hong Kong.

== Awards ==
In 2018, Maximilian Büsser was awarded the Prix Gaïa "Spirit of Enterprise"" in recognition of his creative approach to watchmaking in the design and marketing of his products, and for the innovative way he manages his business."

== Film ==
Maximilian Büsser features in the documentary feature film Making Time, which also features Philippe Dufour, Aldis Hodge and Nico Cox.

== Personal life ==
Maximilian Busser's mother was a Parsi Zoroastrian and he credits her for playing a major role in his success.
