= Rolex Oysterquartz =

Watch model by Rolex

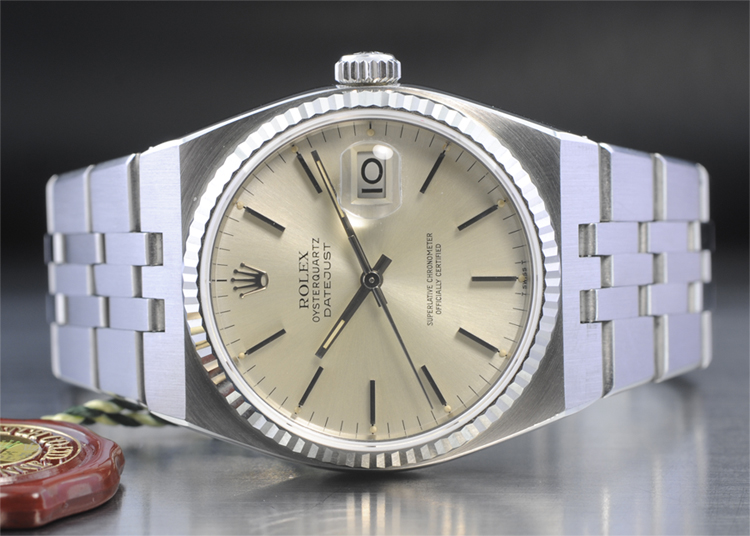
Rolex Datejust Oysterquartz Ref. 17014

The Rolex Oysterquartz was a range of quartz watches made by Rolex from 1976 until 2001.

== History ==
At the end of the 1970s, the Swiss watch industry was affected by the quartz crisis. Japanese watchmakers supplied the world market with large quantities of quartz watches. Whilst many other manufacturers chose to use off-the-shelf quartz movement, Rolex responded to the crisis by designing and manufacturing its own quartz movement, similar in size to its automatic movements so that it could be included in further ranges.

The Datejust Oysterquartz was released in 1976. The design differs greatly from the classic Rolex line and carved characteristics of the period: a completely angular case, an integrated band with a polished finish, and sapphire glass. The whole range consisted of three versions: gold, steel with white gold bezel, and steel and yellow gold. At launch, it was the most accurate watch Rolex had ever produced.

The quartz-powered version of the 18038 Day-Date sold for 15 per cent more than the mechanically powered equivalent.

Rolex submitted their final quartz calibers for chronometer certification in 2001, and they were no longer available in the catalogue from 2003.

Although the range was offered for 25 years, only an estimated 25,000 watches were made. This marks the range as a relative rarity in the Rolex catalogue and thus sought after by collectors.

== Movement ==
Unlike most mass produced quartz watches, the Oysterquartz movement is notable for its use of an escape wheel and pallet fork (resembling a lever escapement), but having its impulse provided by a stepping motor mechanically similar to a d'Arsonval galvanometer.

== Legacy ==
In 2025, Rolex introduced the Land-Dweller, inspired by the Oysterquartz. Although it features an automatic movement, it sports a similar case and integrated bracelet to the original.

== Model numbers ==
Model numbers of the Rolex Oysterquartz include:

Reference	Model	Case	Bezel	Bracelet	Gem setting
17000	Oysterquartz Datejust	Stainless steel	Polished stainless steel	Stainless steel integral Oyster bracelet	None
17013	Oysterquartz Datejust	Stainless steel	18K yellow gold fluted bezel	Stainless steel and 18K yellow gold integral Jubilee bracelet	None
17014	Oysterquartz Datejust	Stainless steel	18K white gold fluted bezel	Stainless steel integral Jubilee bracelet	None
19018	Oysterquartz Day-Date	18K yellow gold	18K yellow gold fluted bezel	18K yellow gold integral President bracelet with hidden clasp	None
19019	Oysterquartz Day-Date	18K white gold	18K white gold fluted bezel	18K white gold integral President bracelet with hidden clasp	None
19028	Oysterquartz Day-Date	18K yellow gold	18K yellow gold Pyramid bezel	18K yellow gold integral Pyramid bracelet with hidden clasp	None
19038	Oysterquartz Day-Date	18K yellow gold	18K yellow gold Pyramid bezel	18K yellow gold integral Pyramid bracelet with hidden clasp	Bezel set with 12 brilliants
19048	Oysterquartz Day-Date	18K yellow gold	18K yellow gold bezel	18K yellow gold integral President bracelet with hidden clasp	Bezel set with 44 brilliants; dial set with 8 brilliants and 2 baguettes
19049	Oysterquartz Day-Date	18K white gold	18K white gold bezel	18K white gold integral President bracelet with hidden clasp	Bezel set with 44 brilliants; dial set with 8 brilliants and 2 baguettes
19068	Oysterquartz Day-Date	18K yellow gold	18K yellow gold bezel	18K yellow gold integral Pyramid bracelet with hidden clasp	Bezel set with 44 brilliants; dial set with 8 brilliants and 2 baguettes
19148	Oysterquartz Day-Date	18K yellow gold	18K yellow gold bezel	18K yellow gold integral Karat bracelet with hidden clasp	
