= Watches and Wonders =

International watch and jewellery industry trade show

Watches and Wonders Geneva
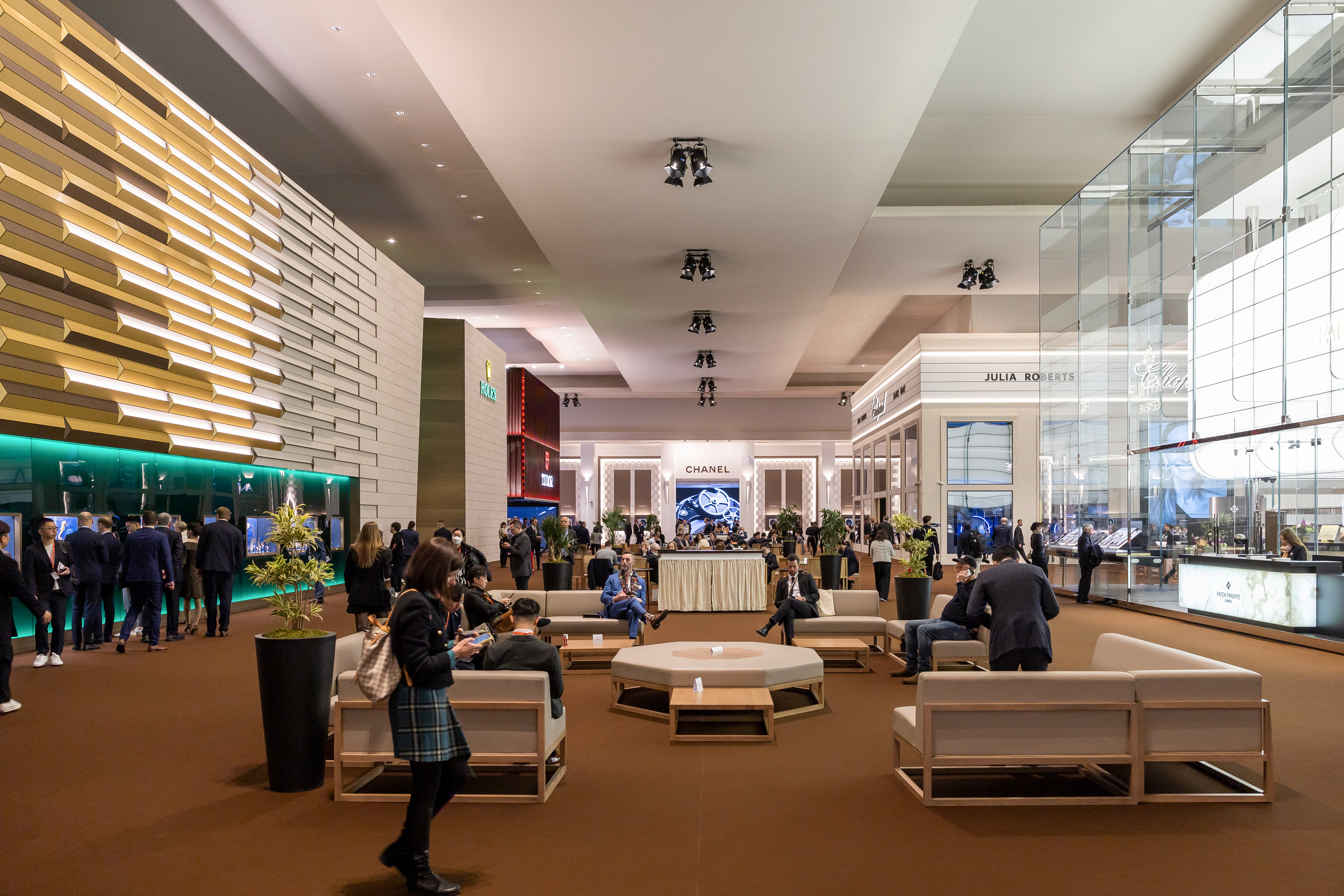
- Watches and Wonders Geneva 2023
- Status: Watch exhibition
- Frequency: Annually
- Venue: Palexpo Convention Center
- Location: Geneva
- Country: Switzerland
- Years active: 2022 – present
- Organizer: Watches and Wonders Geneva Foundation (WWGF)
- Website: watchesandwonders.com

Watches and Wonders (formerly Salon International de la Haute Horlogerie) is an annual trade show held at Palexpo in Geneva, Switzerland showing over 60 watchmaking houses. The expo is attended by watch industry professionals, journalists, enthusiasts, and collectors.

In 2020 and 2021, the show was opened to the public for the first time in a virtual format. In 2022, three days of the event were made accessible to the public in person.

The 2025 edition welcomed 55,000 visitors, including nearly 1,600 journalists.

Watches and Wonders also operated in China.

== History ==
Watches and Wonders Geneva Foundation (WWGF) is a successor to he Salon International de la Haute Horlogerie (SIHH), which dates back to 1991.

It was rebranded in 2019 in an effort to open the event to the wider public, and reflect an consumer appetite for more immediate information and media. The first event was held in 2022.

== Exhibitors ==
Exhibitors at Watches and Wonders Geneva 2026:

- A. Lange & Söhne
- Alpina
- Angelus Watches
- Armin Strom
- Arnold & Son
- Artya Geneve
- Audemars Piguet
- Baume & Mercier
- Behrens
- Bianchet
- Bremont
- B.R.M Chronographes
- Bvlgari
- Cartier
- Chanel
- Charles Girardier
- Chopard
- Christiaan Van Der Klaauw
- Chronoswiss
- Corum
- Credor
- Cyrus Genève
- Czapek & Cie
- Eberhard & Co.
- Favre Leuba
- Ferdinand Berthoud
- Frederique Constant
- Genus
- Gerald Charles
- Grand Seiko
- Grönefeld
- Hautlence
- H. Moser & Cie
- Hermès
- Hublot
- HYT
- IWC
- Jaeger-LeCoultre
- Kross Studio
- L'epee 1839
- Laurent Ferrier
- Louis Moinet
- March LA.B
- Nomos Glashütte
- Norqain
- Oris
- Panerai
- Parmigiani Fleurier
- Patek Philippe
- Pequinet
- Piaget
- Raymond Weil
- Ressence
- Roger Dubuis
- Rolex
- Rudis Sylva
- Sinn Spezialuhren
- TAG Heuer
- Trilobe
- Tudor
- U-Boat
- Ulysse Nardin
- Vacheron Constantin
- Van Cleef & Arpels
- Zenith

=== Watches and Wonders Shanghai ===
The Watches and Wonders Geneva Foundation (WWGF) brought its flagship event to Shanghai in 2020, 2021, 2023, and 2024, hosted at the West Bund Art Center.

- The 2022 edition was cancelled due to the COVID-19 pandemic.
- In 2024, the event was open to the public for several days, marking a first for the Chinese market.

The show featured two days for professionals and three days for public visitors, with strong attendance from younger audiences, 70% of public tickets were sold to visitors under 35.

- A. Lange & Söhne
- Baume & Mercier
- Cartier
- IWC
- Nomos Glashütte
- Panerai
- Piaget
- Roger Dubuis
- Vacheron Constantin

=== Watches and Wonders Hainan ===
The Watches and Wonders Geneva Foundation (WWGF) brought its immersive exhibition to Hainan, China, from December 2, 2022, to February 28, 2023. The event took place in two different locations: International Duty Free Shopping Complex in Sanya and cdf Mall in Haikou.

This edition was open to the general public, offering a three-month immersive experience that blended watch exhibitions with interactive experiences.

The event coincided with the Chinese New Year festivities on January 22, 2023.

- A. Lange & Söhne
- Baume & Mercier
- Cartier
- Girard-Perregaux
- Hermès
- IWC
- Jaeger-LeCoultre
- Montblanc
- Panerai
- Piaget
- Roger Dubuis
- Ulysse Nardin
- Vacheron Constantin

== Watches and Wonders Geneva Foundation ==
Watches and Wonders Geneva Foundation (WWGF) was established in September 2022 as a non-profit foundation. Its mission is to promote watchmaking expertise and craftsmanship around the world.

WWGF was founded at the initiative of Rolex, Richemont, and Patek Philippe. It is governed by a foundation board chaired by Cyrille Vigneron (Cartier), with Claude Peny (Patek Philippe) as vice-chair.

In 2024, three new members joined the board: Chanel, Hermès, and LVMH. The board focuses on defining strategic and developmental directions.

An exhibitor committee, composed of representatives from participating brands, oversees the proper conduct of the event and contributes to operational decisions.

The CEO of WWGF, Matthieu Humair, leads a team of around 30 people.

== See also ==
- Baselworld
- Hong Kong Watch & Clock Fair
