= Big Blue Ocean Cleanup =

Non-profit organization

- Formation: 27 February 2018; 8 years ago
- Founder: Rory Sinclair
- Founded at: York
- Legal status: nonprofit organization
- Purpose: Cleaning the oceans
- Website: www.bigblueoceancleanup.org

Big Blue Ocean Cleanup (est. in 2018) is an international nonprofit environmental organization with offices in York (UK), Vancouver (Canada), Kuala Lumpur (Malaysia), and Sydney (Australia). It is focused on cleaning beaches and the oceans, protecting wildlife, ocean research and innovative technologies development.

== History ==
Big Blue Ocean Cleanup was established on 27 February 2018, by Rory Sinclair.

In March 2019, it supported the “Cash for trash” initiative, launched by an APEM freshwater consultancy.

On 22 April 2020 (the Earth Day), Big Blue Ocean Cleanup was featured in Zac Efron’s documentary The Great Global Clean Up, aired on Discovery Channel. In May 2020, Big Blue Ocean Cleanup’s volunteers were involved in removing the remainants of a large fin whale from the Clacton-on-Sea beach in Essex. In September 2020, the organization partnered with the team of Scottish rowers on their Northwest Passage expedition, planned for 2021. Team members will to collect data for the Big Blue Ocean Cleanup, including micro plastic content in the water.

== Initiatives ==
=== Beaches cleanup ===
Cleaning up beaches is the main activity of Big Blue Ocean Cleanup. These events are being organized by the non-profit ambassadors and involve various communities, from company workers to students, to local volunteers.

=== "Ocean Savior" project ===
In October 2018, Big Blue Ocean Cleanup’s experts supported Ocean Saviour project, an initiative of Richard W. Roberts and Simon White, founders of TheYachtMarket.com, to build self-powering 70m tri-deck clean-up vessel, which will retrieve and recycle plastic from the ocean.

== Sponsors ==
The non-profit is supported mainly by small and medium-sized enterprises (some examples being search-engine Ekoru, Subsea Expo, provider of marine engineering services James Fisher & Sons and packaging supplier Storopack).
