= MB&F =

Swiss watch and clock manufacturer

- Type: Private
- Industry: Watchmaking
- Founded: 2005
- Founder: Maximilian Büsser
- Headquarters: Geneva, Switzerland
- Area served: Worldwide
- Key people: Maximilian Büsser; Serge Kriknoff
- Products: Watches, Clocks
- Production output: 350 pieces (2022)
- Number of employees: 48 (2023)
- Website: www.mbandf.com

MB&F (Maximilian Büsser and Friends) is a Swiss luxury watch and clock manufacturer founded by Maximilian Busser in July 2005 in Geneva, Switzerland. MB&F specializes in small series of concept-type watches. MB&F's clocks have a futuristic style, and the company has collaborated with other artists and watchmakers.

== History ==
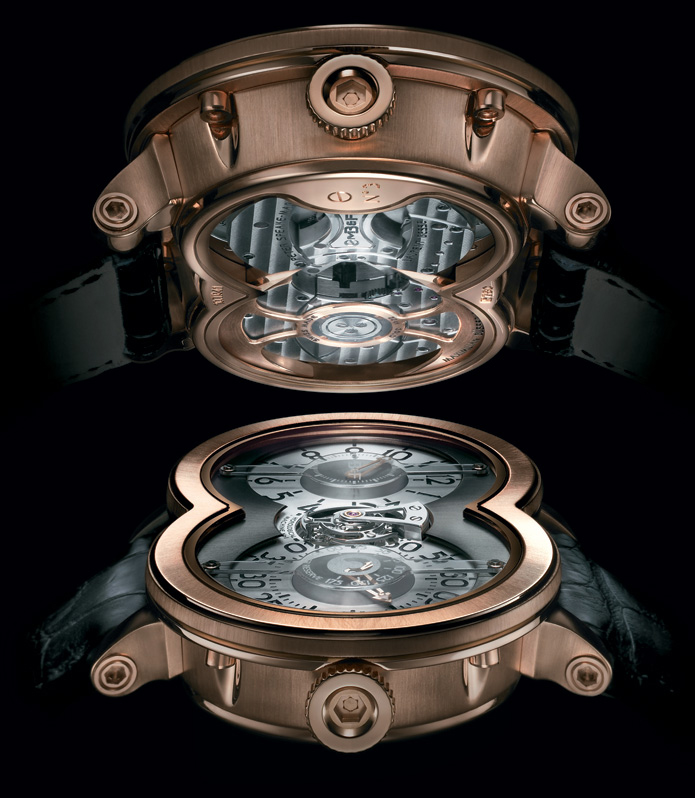
MB&F HM1 in red gold

MB&F was founded by Maximilian Büsser in July 2005 in Geneva, Switzerland. MB&F launched its first watch, Horological Machine No.1 (HM1) in 2007. MB&F has since launched more than 10 atypical 'horological machines'. In 2011, the brand presented Legacy Machine No.1 (LM1), the first in a collection of more traditional-looking, round-cased watches. In 2012, LM1 was awarded twice at the Grand Prix de l’Horlogerie de Genève (GPHG): Best Men's Watch and the Public Prize.

In 2018 MB&F was granted a patent for a perpetual calendar mechanism that automatically corrects at the end of months having less than 31 days.

In 2024, 25% of the company was acquired by Chanel for an undisclosed amount. Despite the new investment, Büsser, retains the majority ownership with 60%, while Serge Kriknoff hold 15%.

== Notable models ==
In 2010 the HM4 Thunderbolt was awarded the Best Concept and Design Watch by the Grand Prix d'Horlogerie de Genève.

In 2012 the Legacy Machine No.1 was awarded both Best Men’s Watch Prize and the Public prize at the Grand Prix d'Horlogerie de Genève.

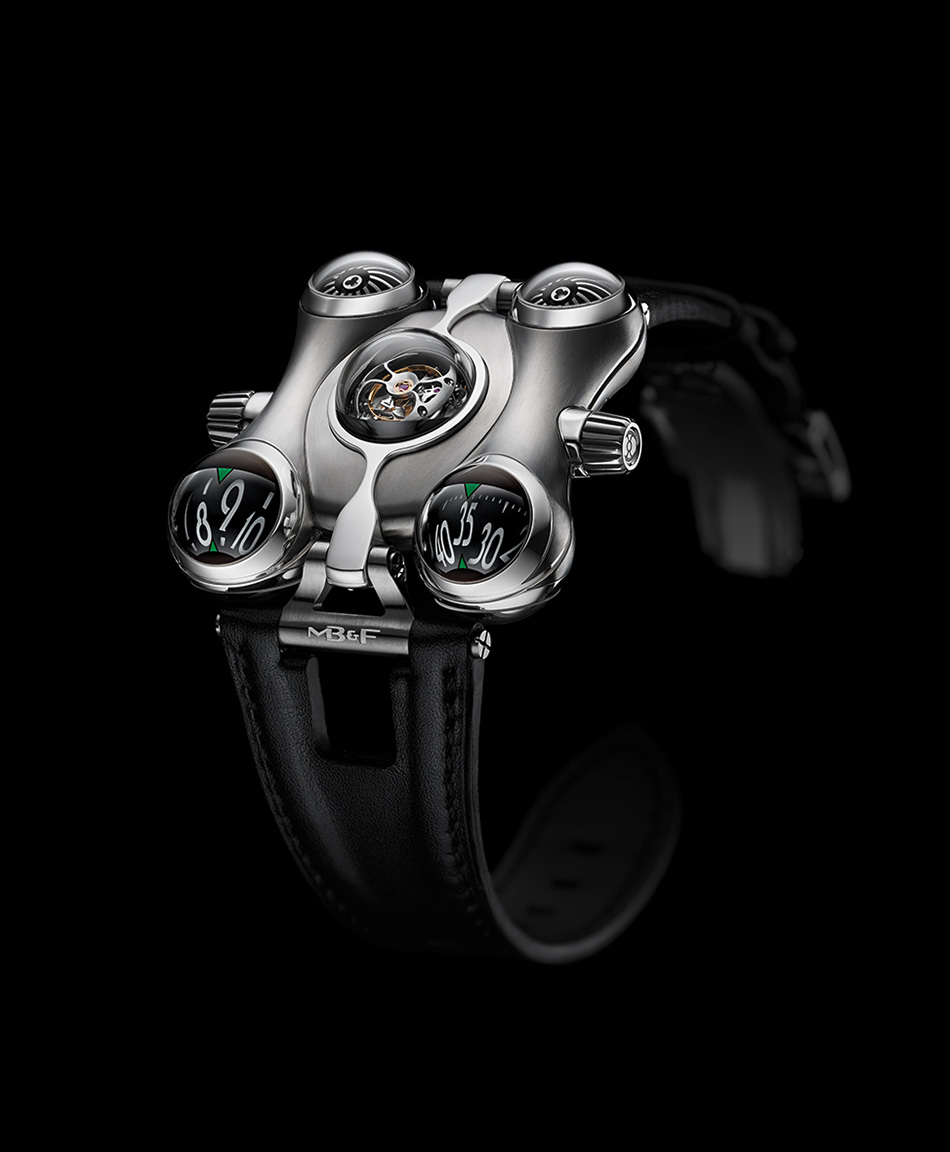
MB&F HM6

The Horological Machine No.6 (HM6) features a rounded biomorphic case, flying tourbillon under a retractable cover, and automatic winding. It displays hours and minutes on separate semi-spherical aluminum indication domes, crown to open/close a central flying tourbillon shield. It features hour and minute indications on domes, automatic winding regulated by twin turbines developed exclusively for HM6 by MB&F.

In 2015 Horological Machine No.6 received a ‘Red Dot: Best of the Best" award – the top prize at the international Red Dot Awards.

In 2015, MB&F presented Legacy Machine Perpetual featuring a new perpetual calendar architecture. LM Perpetual has a large-diameter suspended balance with traditional Breguet overcoil suspended over on the dial from twin arches with the complete perpetual calendar complication visible on full display above the movement plate. It displays hours, minutes, day, date, month, retrograde leap year and power reserve indicators. It has a fully integrated perpetual calendar developed for MB&F by Stephen McDonnell, featuring dial-side complication and mechanical processor system architecture with inbuilt safety mechanisms.

In 2016 Legacy Machine Perpetual won the Best Calendar Watch Prize at the Grand Prix d’Horlogerie de Genève (GPHG).

In 2018, Maximilian Büsser was awarded an Entrepreneurship prize by the Gaïa Prix.

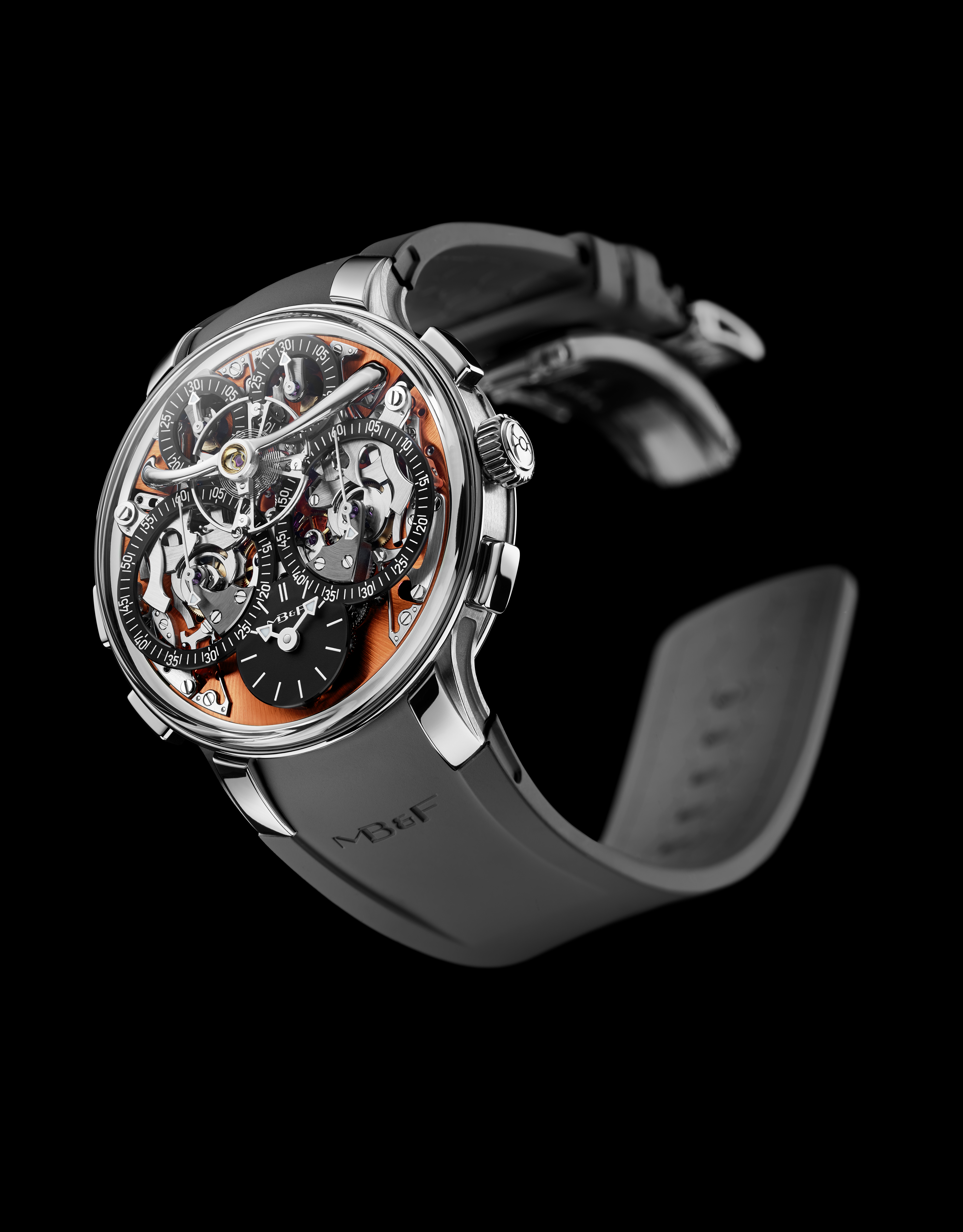
LM Sequential EVO

In 2019 MB&F presented the brand's first ladies' watch, the LM FlyingT It features a central three-dimensional tourbillon movement, much of which is visible above the dial. The time is displayed on an inclined subdial at 7 o'clock. Hours and minutes are displayed on a 50° vertically tilted dial with two serpentine hands. Its movement is a three-dimensional vertical architecture, with automatic winding, conceived and developed in-house by Maximilian Büsser and Friends, central 60-second flying tourbillon, and 100-hour power reserve. In 2019, LM FlyingT won Best Ladies Complication at the Grand Prix d'Horlogerie de Genève (GPHG).

In 2020, MB&F launched HM10 Bulldog, which features an unusual power reserve indication displayed by the opening and closing of the ”bulldog’s” jaws at the bottom of the watch. Under a large domed crystal, a high central balance wheel oscillates between the hour and minute indicator domes.

In 2022, MB&F presented LM Sequential EVO, a revolutionary dual chronograph. The movement features two column-wheel chronographs and a “Twinverter” binary pusher that enables multiple timing modes, including independent timing, split-second timing, sequential lap timer, and cumulative “chess match” timing. LM Sequential EVO won the top horological prize of 2022, the GPHG “Aiguille d’Or”.

== M.A.D. Gallery ==
Büsser created the first MB&F M.A.D. Gallery in 2011 in Geneva, Switzerland. "M.A.D." stands for Mechanical Art Devices. Büsser considers his timepieces to be kinetic art and created his own art gallery to display his sculptured Horological Machines in the context of mechanical art by other artists.

In addition to Geneva, there are now M.A.D. Galleries in Dubai and Taipei, and smaller ”MB&F Labs” in Singapore and Paris.

== See also ==
- List of watch manufacturers
- Manufacture d'horlogerie
