= Romain Gauthier =

Swiss businessman (born 1975)

- Industry: Watch manufacturing
- Founded: Switzerland (2002)
- Founder: Romain Gauthier
- Headquarters: Le Sentier and Vallée de Joux, Switzerland
- Key people: Romain Gauthier
- Products: Watches
- Website: www.romaingauthier.com

Romain Gauthier is a Swiss businessman and watchmaker.

== Life ==
Romain Gauthier was born in 1975 in Vallée de Joux, Switzerland. He specialized in precision mechanics in college and upon graduation he started working at François Golay. He is an independent Swiss manufacturer of watches based in Le Sentier and Vallée de Joux, Switzerland. He has been praised for his innovative horology engineering techniques and his design studio is also known for producing unique luxury items such as mechanical cufflinks.

'Montres Romain Gauthier' launched in 2006 with the Prestige HM, featuring Romain Gauthier's own in-house manufacture movement. The HM was followed in 2012 by the Prestige HMS and Logical One in 2013.

Logical One is a reinvention of the chain-and-fusee constant force mechanism, with a snail cam replacing the cone-shaped fusee.
