= Le Sentier =

Village in Vaud, Switzerland

Coordinates: 46°37′N 6°14′E

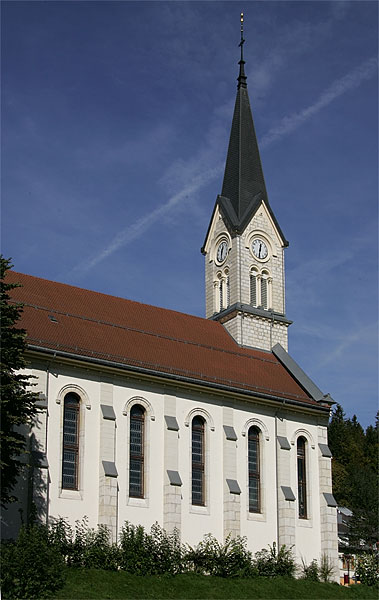
Church of Le Sentier

Le Sentier is a village in the Vallée de Joux in the Canton of Vaud, Switzerland. Part of the municipality Le Chenit, the village has 3,000 inhabitants.

Numerous Swiss watchmakers are based in Le Sentier: Jaeger-LeCoultre, Gérald Genta, Patek Philippe, Vacheron Constantin, Romain Gauthier.
