= Power reserve indicator =

Watch complication

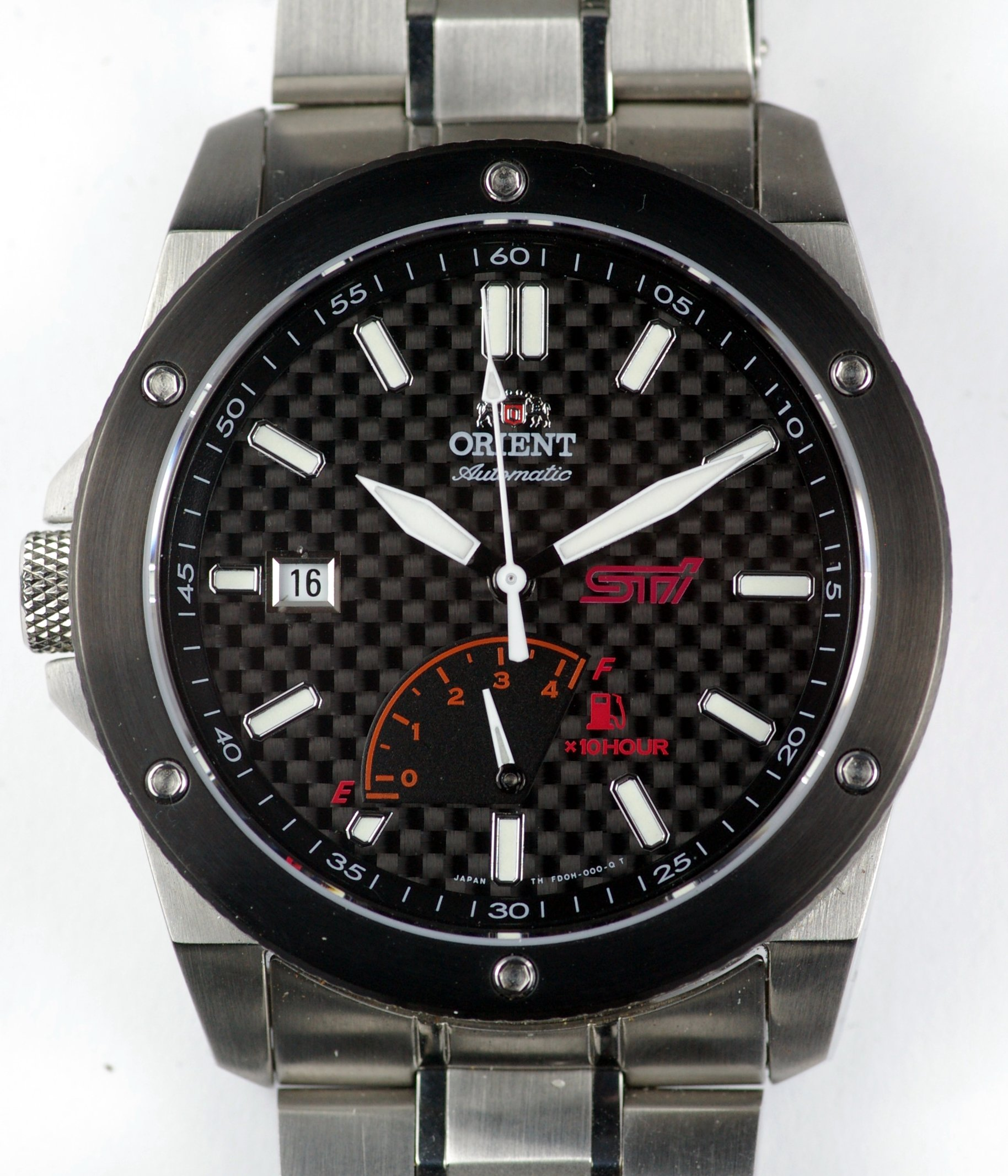
The power reserve is at the 6 position on this automatic watch. Here it is indicating that 25 out of 42 hours remain.

A power reserve indicator (originally called Réserve de Marche) is a complication of the watch, which is designed to show the amount of remaining stored energy. The power reserve indicator indicates the tension on the mainspring at any particular moment.

== Overview ==
The power reserve indicator is one of the most useful features of a mechanical watch besides the actual time display. A mechanical watch is operated by either automatic or manual winding. In order to run at a regular rate a mechanical timepiece needs to have at least 30 per cent of its mainspring wound. An automatic timepiece needs to be worn for about 10–15 hours before it is fully wound.

The power reserve indicator displayed on the watch with automatic- winding movement shows how long a watch will function when not worn. On a manual winding watch, it shows the time left until the watch needs winding.

== Brief history ==
There are numerous devices for recording the amount of mainspring power stored in the barrel. Power reserve indicators were employed very early on marine chronometers and later in the accurate Railroad grade pocket watches. Today they are used in wrist watches. The first wristwatch with the mechanism was created by Breguet in 1933. However, this was only a prototype with only one watch assembled.

In 1948, Jaeger-LeCoultre introduced a power reserve indicator designed for production in a series of watches called the Powermatic which utilized the LeCoultre Caliber 481. Thus, Jaeger-LeCoultre was ostensibly the first watchmaking company to launch wristwatches with a power reserve indicator to the masses.

== Functioning ==
In general, the indication of the power reserve is sometimes represented through a needle or hand or it may be indicted by a revolving wheel viewed through an aperture. Some more modern devices have linear indicators. In the case of a hand indicator, the needle or hand moves from one point of the indicator to another. The zone along which the needle moves, shows how much time is left until the mechanism would be expected to cease autonomous operation. Correspondingly, when the hand leaves the zone (or stops) the watch needs to be wound. The indicator itself represents the amount of tension of the mainspring, thus the lower the tension the less time left until another winding of the watch is required.

=== The LeCoultre 481 ===
The LeCoultre 481 utilized a differential device to show the power reserve stored in either a self-winding or hand-wound mainspring.

=== Operating Principle ===
The principle of any power reserve device is that when the mainspring is wound either automatically or manually, a special train of gears connected to the ratchet wheel or the barrel arbor drives the power reserve indication showing the extent of the wind. The barrel’s teeth are also connected to the other side of this differential train so that as the mainspring's power is used, the power reserve indication moves in the opposite direction.

== See also ==
- Watch
