= Baselworld =

Jewelry trade show in Basel, Switzerland

Coordinates: 47.5641624°N 7.5972672°E

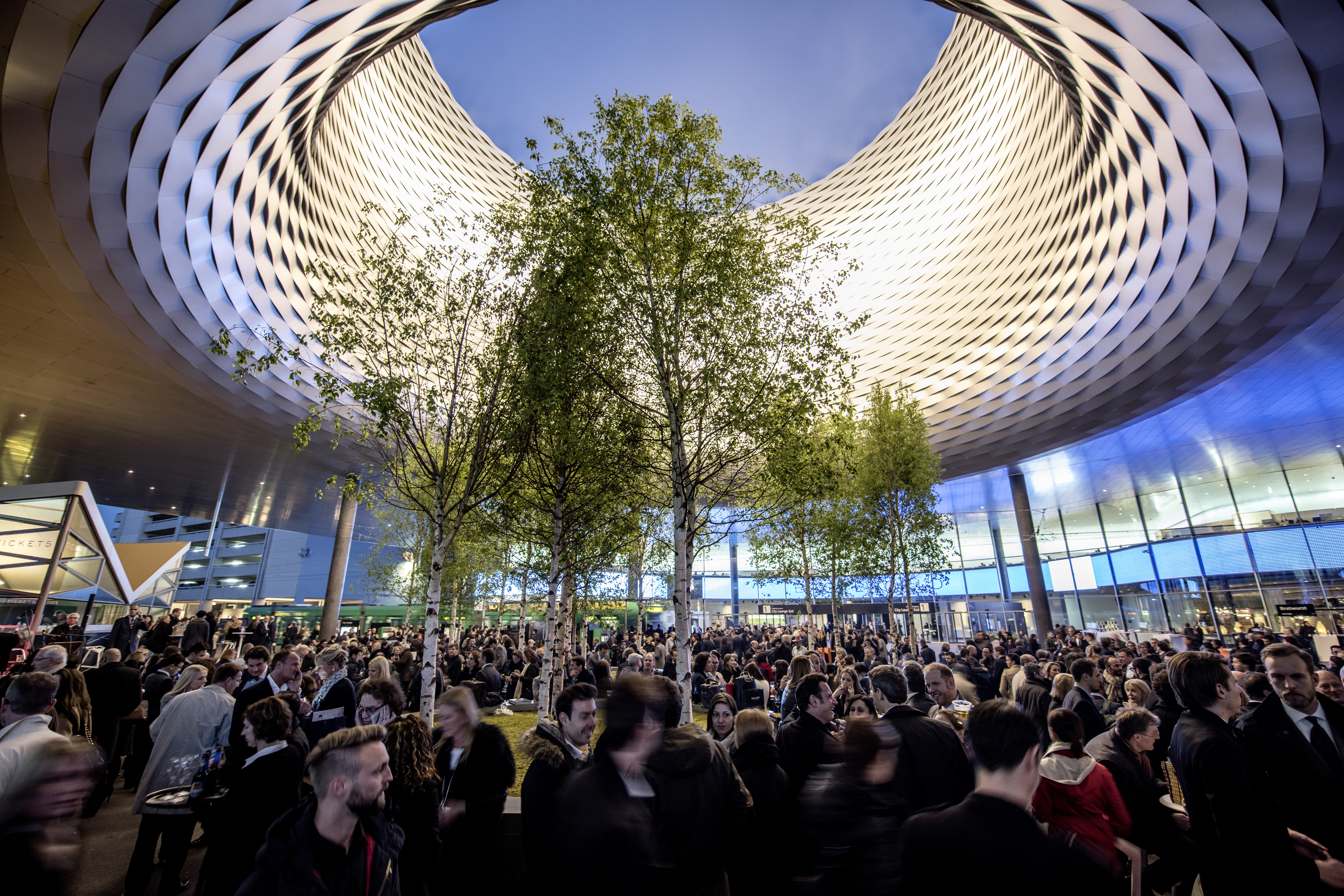
Baselworld outside view

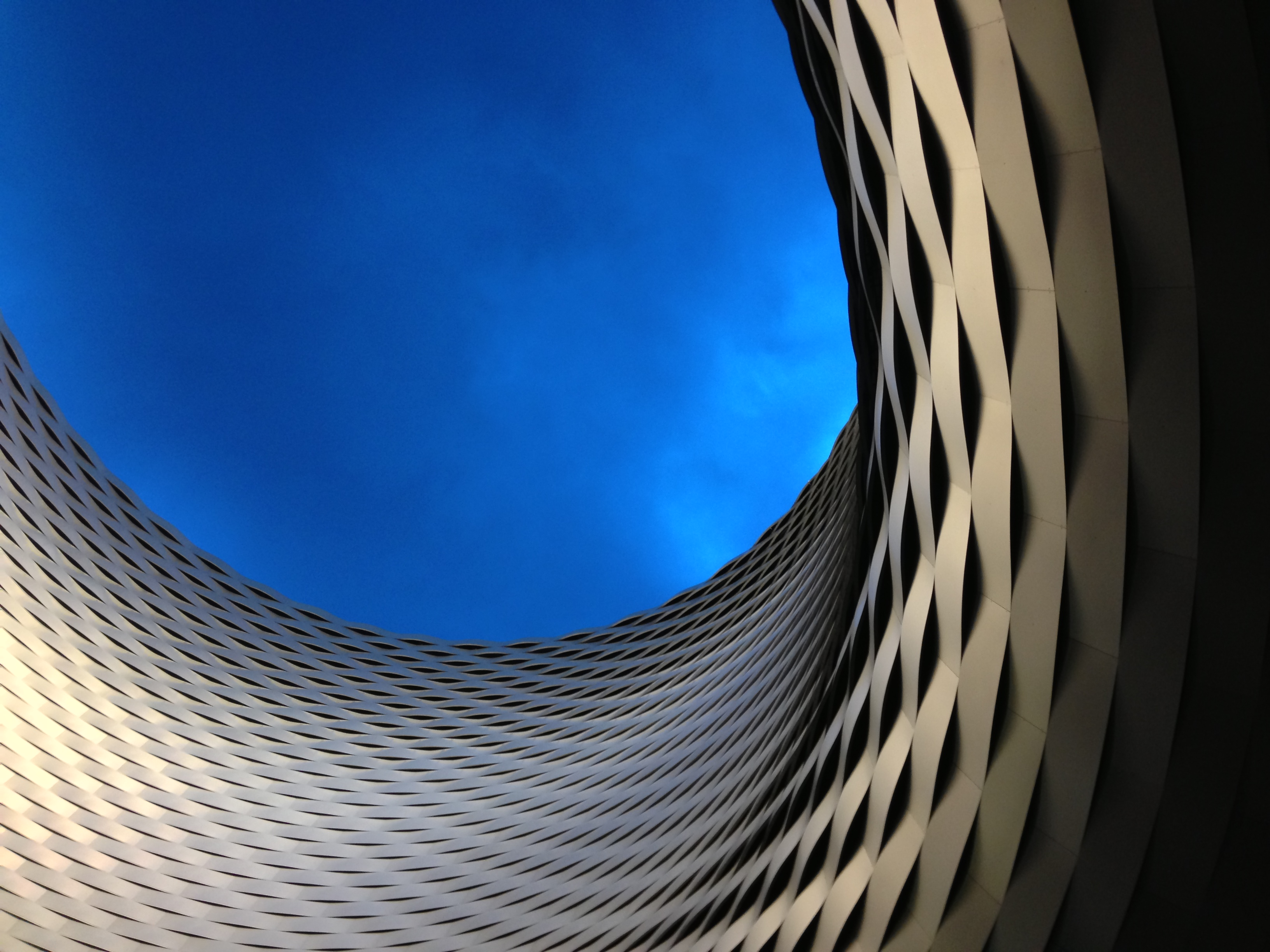
The building of Messe Basel, designed by Herzog & de Meuron

Baselworld Watch and Jewellery Show was a global trade show of the international watch, jewellery and gem industry, organized each spring in the city of Basel, Switzerland, at the Messeplatz.

The last Baselworld was held March 21–26, 2019. In 2020 and 2021 the event was not held due to the COVID-19 pandemic, and from 2022 the event has been cancelled permanently. Baselworld organizer MCH Group, which organizes around 30 live marketing platforms in Switzerland and abroad, chose to discontinue Baselworld and focus on Art Basel and other events.

== History ==
The show dates back to 1917 with the opening of the first Schweizer Mustermesse Basel (muba), of which a section was devoted to watches and jewellery. In 1925, muba invited several watch manufacturers to participate.

In 1931, the Schweizer Uhrenmesse (Swiss Watch Show) was first held in a dedicated pavilion. After 1972's Europe's meeting place exhibition, companies from France, Italy, Germany, and the United Kingdom were also invited. In 1983, the show changed its name to BASEL with two numerals denoting the exhibition year, for instance BASEL 83. In 1986, companies from outside Europe were included for the first time, reflecting the increased number of visitors from the old continent. In 1995, the show was renamed to BASEL 95 - The World Watch, Clock and Jewellery Show. In 1999, a new hall with 36.000 sq-m of exhibition space was added. The year 2000 saw an increase of 6% in trade visitors. In 2003 the show was again renamed to Baselworld, The Watch and Jewellery Show. In 2004, with the introduction of a new hall complex, the exhibition area extended to 160.000 square meters, and attracted more than 89.000 visitors. In 2018, Baselworld saw a significant drop in exhibitors to 650, and the duration of the exhibition was shortened by two days, although attendance remained stable. However, the Swatch Group communicated that they would no longer attend the next Baselworld with any of their brands in that year as well.

In the following year (2019) Baselworld announced that they would coordinate their dates from 2020 until 2024 with SIHH, and the management presented a new concept for Baselworld. The show will evolve from a classic trade fair to an experience platform and will also address consumers. In April 2020 Rolex, Patek Philippe, Chopard, Chanel and Tudor announced that they would be pulling out of Baselworld and host their own fair in April 2021.

The new Baselworld digital platform is supplemented by events, which will be available to the jewellery, watch and gem industry on-demand, 356 days a year, worldwide.

== See also ==
- Hong Kong Watch & Clock Fair
- Watches & Wonders
