= Jaeger-LeCoultre =

Swiss luxury watch and clock manufacturer

Coordinates: 46.61279°N 6.23678°E

Manufacture Jaeger-LeCoultre SA
- Type: Subsidiary
- Industry: Luxury watchmaking
- Founded: 1833; 193 years ago
- Founder: Antoine LeCoultre
- Headquarters: Le Sentier, Vaud, Switzerland
- Area served: Worldwide
- Key people: Jérôme Lambert, CEO
- Products: Watches, clocks
- Parent: Richemont
- Website: www.jaeger-lecoultre.com

Manufacture Jaeger-LeCoultre SA, or simply Jaeger-LeCoultre (French pronunciation: [ʒeʒɛʁ ləkultʁ]), is a Swiss luxury watchmaker and clock manufacturer founded by Antoine LeCoultre in 1833 and is based in Le Sentier, Switzerland. Since 2000, the company has been a fully owned subsidiary of the Swiss luxury group Richemont.

Jaeger-LeCoultre is regarded as a top-tier Richemont brand. It has hundreds of inventions, patents, and more than one thousand movements to its name, including the world's smallest movement, one of the world's most complicated wristwatches (Grande Complication), and a timepiece of near-perpetual movement (the Atmos clock). Enthusiasts refer to the brand as the 'watchmaker's watchmaker'.

== History ==
=== Early history ===
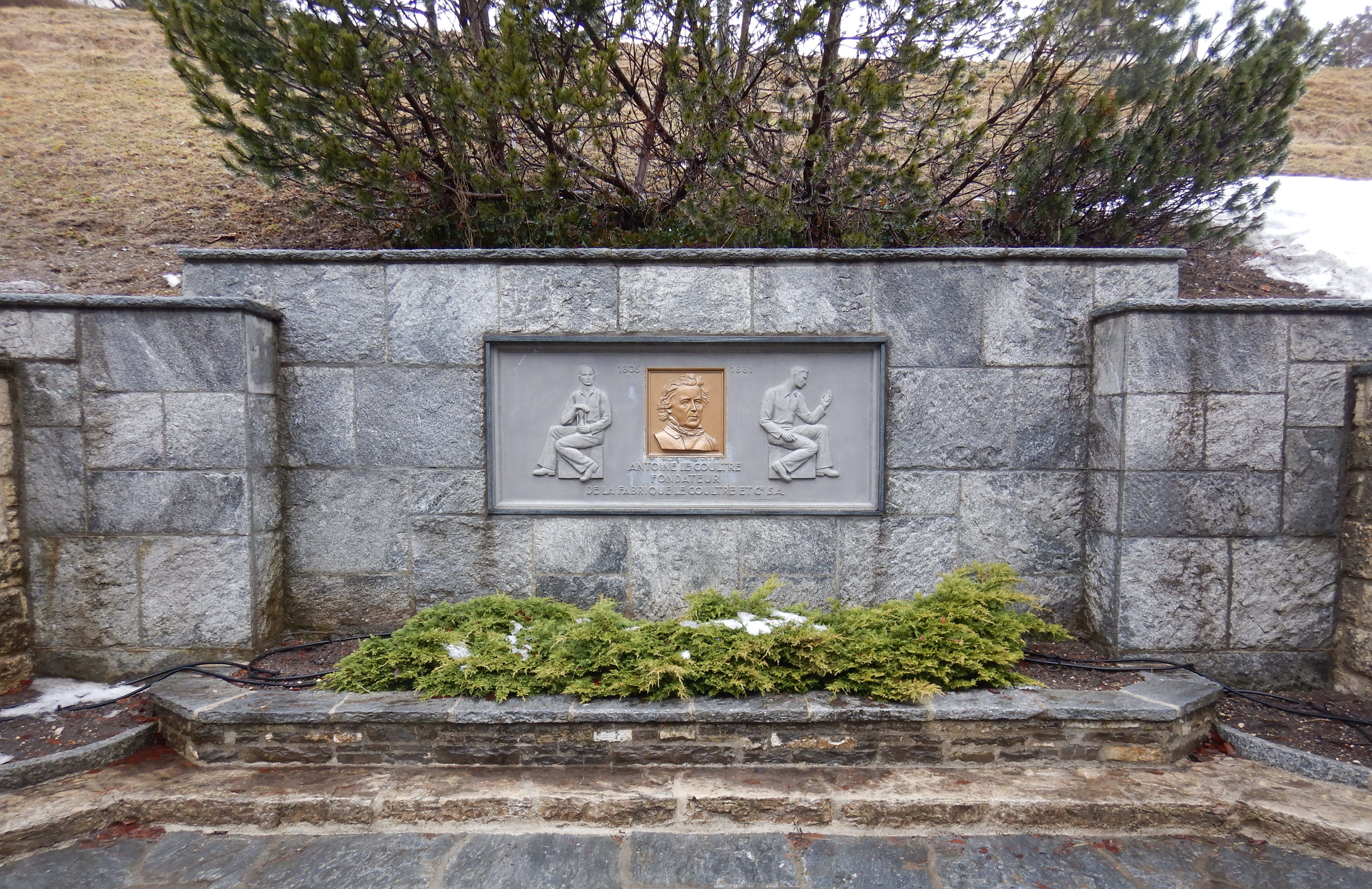
Monument of Antoine LeCoultre

The earliest records of the LeCoultre family in Switzerland date from the 16th century, when Pierre LeCoultre (circa 1530 – circa 1600), a French Huguenot, fled to Geneva from Lizy-sur-Ourcq, France, to escape religious persecution. In 1558, he obtained the status of “inhabitant” but left the following year to acquire a plot of land in the Vallée de Joux. Over time, a small community formed and in 1612, Pierre LeCoultre's son built a church there, marking the founding of the village of Le Sentier where the company's factory is still based.

In 1834, following his invention of a machine to cut watch pinions from steel, Antoine LeCoultre (1803–1881) founded a small watchmaking workshop in Le Sentier, where he honed his horological skills to create high-quality timepieces. In 1844, he invented the world's most precise measuring instrument at the time, the Millionomètre, and in 1847 he created a keyless system to rewind and set watches. Four years later, he was awarded a gold medal for his work on timepiece precision and mechanization at the first Universal Exhibition in London.

In 1866, at a time when watchmaking skills were divided up among hundreds of small workshops, Antoine and his son, Elie LeCoultre (1842–1917), established the Vallée de Joux's first full-fledged manufactory, LeCoultre & Cie., pooling their employees' expertise under one roof. Under this set-up, they developed in 1870 the first partially mechanised production processes for complicated movements.

By the same year, the business employed 500 people and was known as the "Grande Maison of the Vallée de Joux", and by 1900, it had created over 350 different calibres, of which 128 were equipped with chronograph functions and 99 with repeater mechanisms. From 1902 and for the next 30 years, LeCoultre & Cie. produced most of the movement blanks for Patek Philippe of Geneva.

=== Re-organization ===
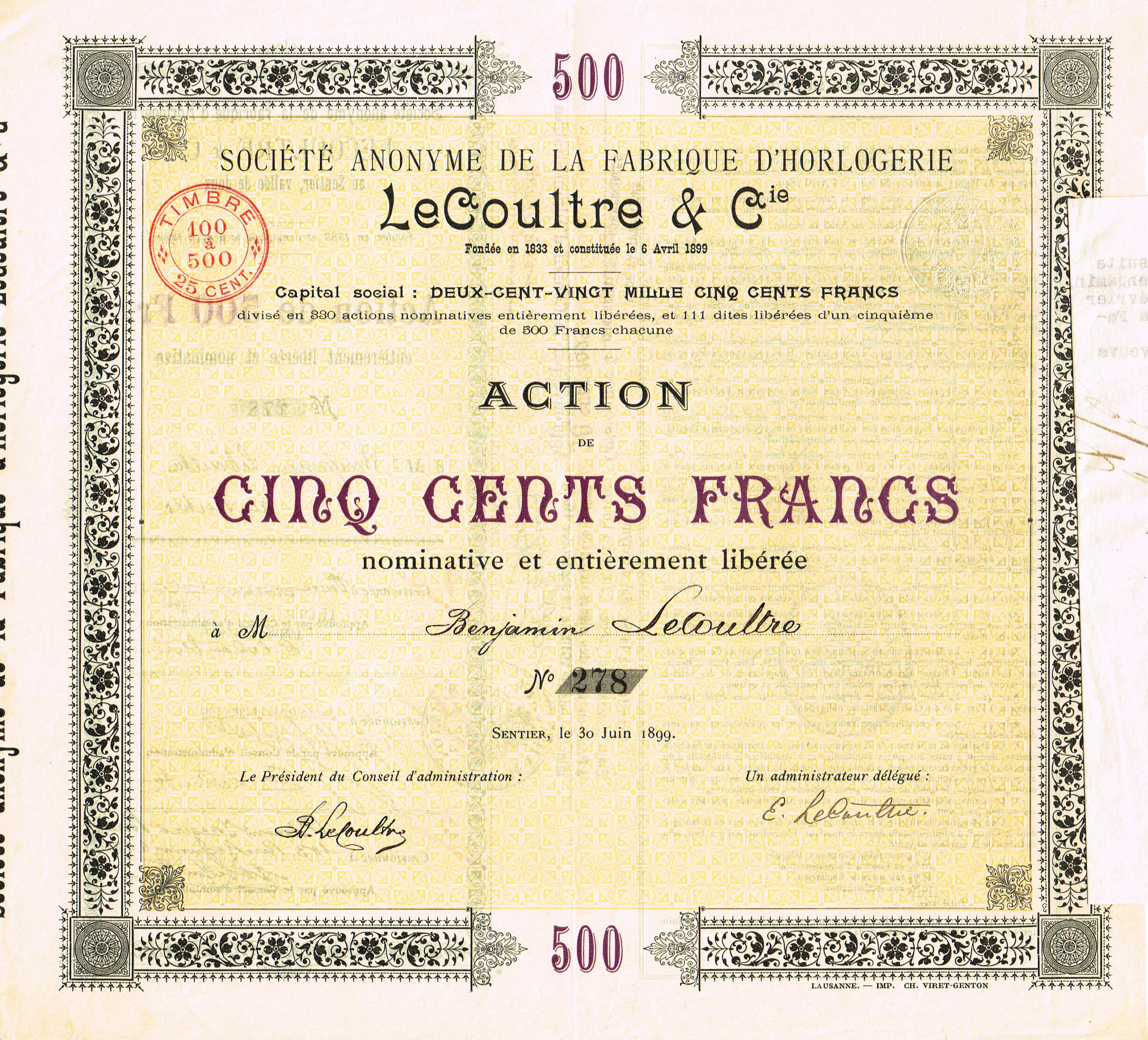
Share of the SA de la Fabrique d'Horlogerie LeCoultre & Cie, issued 30. June 1899

In 1903, Paris-based watchmaker to the French Navy, Edmond Jaeger, challenged Swiss manufacturers to develop and produce the ultra-thin movements that he had invented. Jacques-David LeCoultre, Antoine's grandson who was responsible for production at LeCoultre & Cie., accepted the challenge, giving rise to a collection of ultra-thin pocket watches, including the thinnest in the world in 1907, equipped with the LeCoultre Calibre 145.

The same year, French jeweller Cartier, one of Jaeger's clients, signed a contract with the Parisian watchmaker under which all Jaeger movements for a period of fifteen years would be exclusive to Cartier. The movements were produced by LeCoultre. Edmond Jaeger also acquired the patent for the atmospherically driven clock Atmos from its inventor Jean-Léon Reutter and licensed it to LeCoultre from 1936 for France, and in 1937 for Switzerland.

The collaboration between Jaeger and LeCoultre led to the company being officially renamed Jaeger-LeCoultre in 1937. Before that, LeCoultre of Switzerland and Jaeger of France also formed a company in England, Ed. Jaeger (London) Limited, in 1921 to make instruments for prestige car manufacturers. In 1927 Jaeger LeCoultre sold 75 per cent of the company to S Smith & Sons and in 1937 the company name was changed to British Jaeger Instruments Limited. The 1930 Bentley Speed Six also features gauges made by Jaeger and a clock by S. Smith & Sons.

=== American LeCoultre watches 1932-1985 ===
Due to the Smoot Hawley Tariff Act, from 1932 to approximately 1985 watches were cased in locally produced cases in North America and sold under the name LeCoultre by the company Vacheron-LeCoultre, a subsidiary of Longines-Wittnauer, with slightly different case designs.

After 1985, Jaeger-LeCoultre was adopted uniformly worldwide. According to factory records, the last movement to be used in an American LeCoultre watch was shipped out of Le Sentier in 1976.

Some collectors and misinformed dealers have made the erroneous claim that American LeCoultre is not associated with Jaeger-LeCoultre Switzerland. The confusion stems from the 1950s, when the North American distributor of LeCoultre watches was the Longines-Wittnauer Group, which also was responsible for the distribution of Vacheron Constantin timepieces. Collectors have confused this distribution channel with the manufacture of the watches. According to Jaeger-LeCoultre enthusiast Zaf Basha, the "Galaxy", an upmarket mysterious dial diamond watch, is a collaboration between Vacheron & Constantin and LeCoultre for the American market. It features “LeCoultre” on the front and “Vacheron & Constantin — LeCoultre” stamped on the case. Watches for ladies also bore "LeCoultre" on the front.

The LeCoultre trademark expired in 1985 and was replaced by the Jaeger-LeCoultre trademark.

== Watch manufacturing ==
=== Notable inventions and patents ===
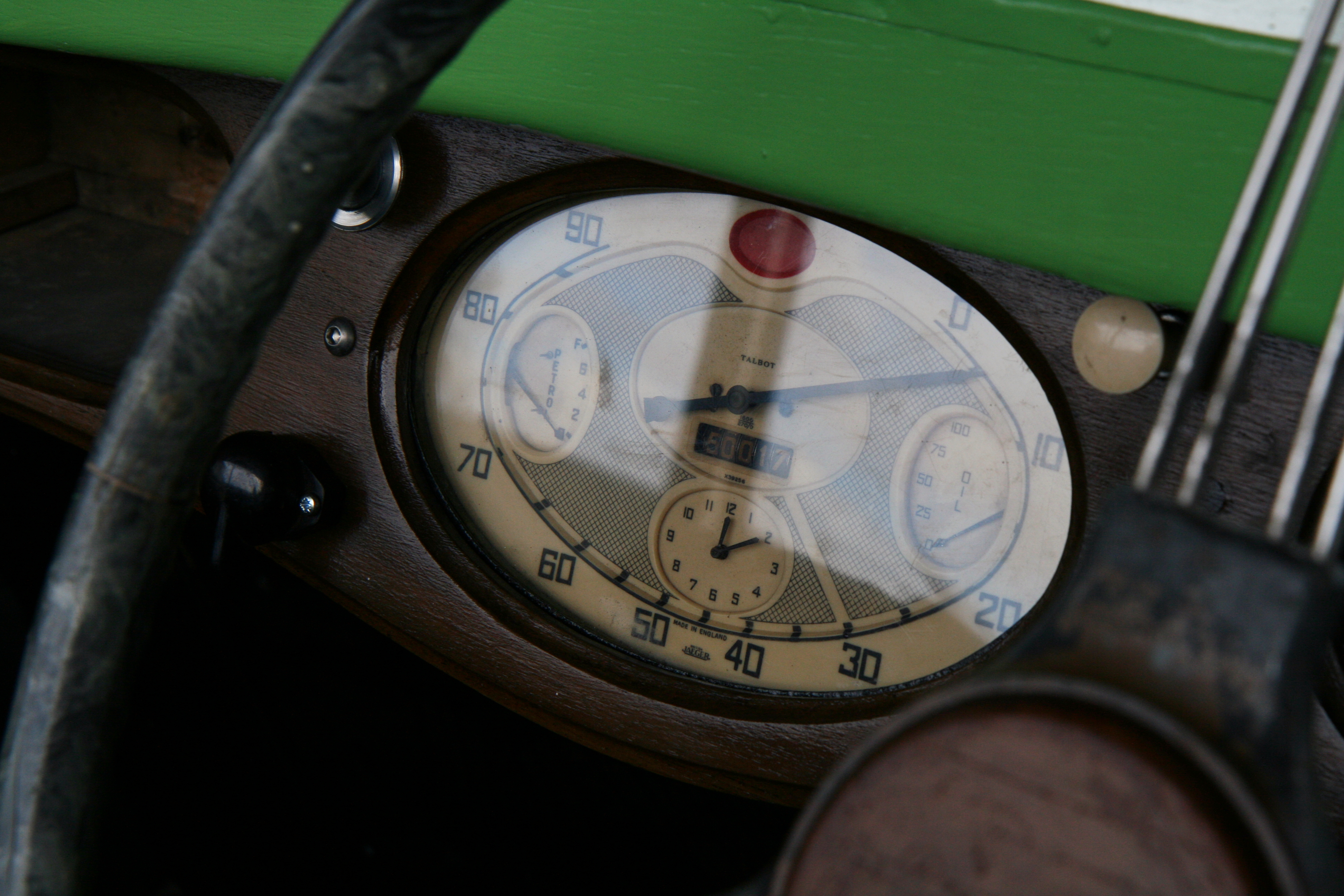
Speedometer 1934 Talbot 105

Since Jaeger-LeCoultre's founding, the company has produced over 1,242 different calibres, registered approximately 400 patents and created hundreds of inventions.

- In 1844, Antoine LeCoultre invented the Millionomètre, which was the first instrument in history capable of measuring the micron, allowing for the precise manufacture of watch parts. The invention was never patented, as no such system existed in Switzerland at the time. However, its unique composition was kept a closely guarded secret, used by the company for more than fifty years. It was presented at the Universal Exhibition in Paris in 1900.
- In 1847, Antoine invented a keyless watch, the second simple and reliable winding and time-setting system to do without a key after Patek Philippe's version of 1845. Instead, it relied on a small push-piece that activated a lever to change over from one function to another. Again, the invention was not patented, allowing other watchmakers to quickly implement the system.
- In 1866, for the first time in watchmaking history, LeCoultre & Cie. began to manufacture calibres with small complications in small series, and in 1891 combined the chronograph and minute repeater complications into a double complication calibre. This subsequently led in the mid-1890s to the production of grandes complications, or watches comprising at least three classic horological complications, such as a perpetual calendar, chronograph and minute repeater. In 2004, Jaeger-LeCoultre created the Gyrotourbillon I, its first grande complication wristwatch, featuring a tourbillon gravitating on two axes, along with a perpetual calendar with double retrograde indicators and a running equation of time. In 2006, it released the Reverso grande complication à triptyque, the first watch in history to be equipped with three dials driven by a single movement, and in 2009 the company produced one of the world's most complicated wristwatches, the Hybris Mechanica à Grande Sonnerie with 26 complications.
- In 1907, the LeCoultre Calibre 145 set the record for the world's thinnest movement at 1.38 mm thick, appearing in pocket watches that remain to this day the thinnest in their category. From 1907 until the 1960s, the movement was produced in some 400 copies.

=== Environmental rating ===
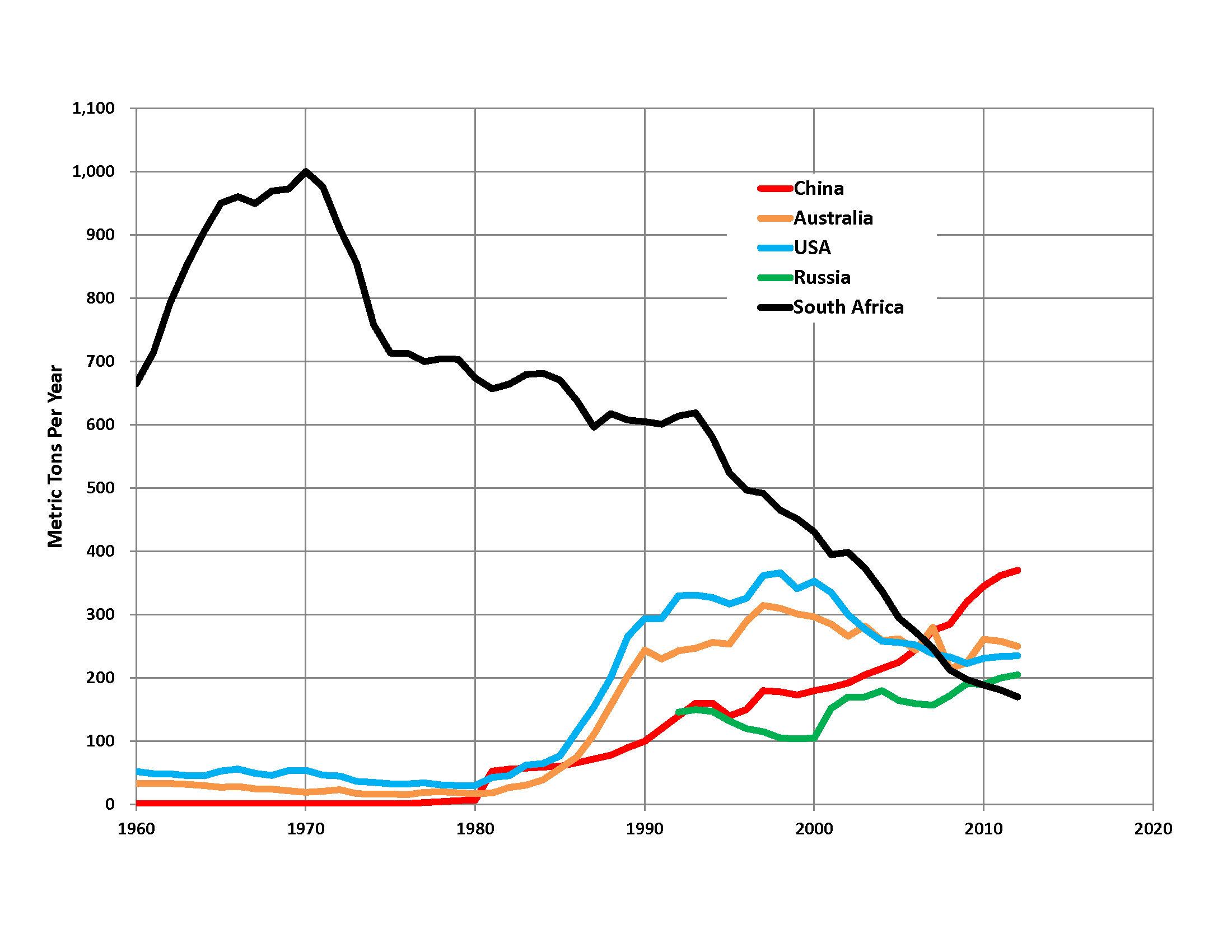
Top 5 gold producing nations

In December 2018, World Wide Fund for Nature (WWF) released an official report giving environmental ratings for 15 major watch manufacturers and jewelers in Switzerland. Jaeger-LeCoultre, along with 3 other manufacturers including Vacheron Constantin and Cartier, was given an average environmental rating as "Upper Midfield", suggesting that the manufacturer has taken first actions addressing the impact of its manufacturing activities on the environment and climate change.

In jewelry and watchmaking industry, there are general concerns over the lack of transparency in manufacturing activities and the sourcing of precious raw materials such as gold, which is a major cause of environmental issues such as pollution, soil degradation and deforestation. The situation is especially serious in the developing countries which are top producers of gold, including China, Russia and South Africa. It is estimated that the watch and jewelry sector uses over 50% of world's annual gold production (over 2,000 tons), but in most cases the watch companies are not able to or are unwilling to demonstrate where their raw materials come from and if the material suppliers use eco-friendly sourcing technologies.

== Notable models ==
=== Reverso ===
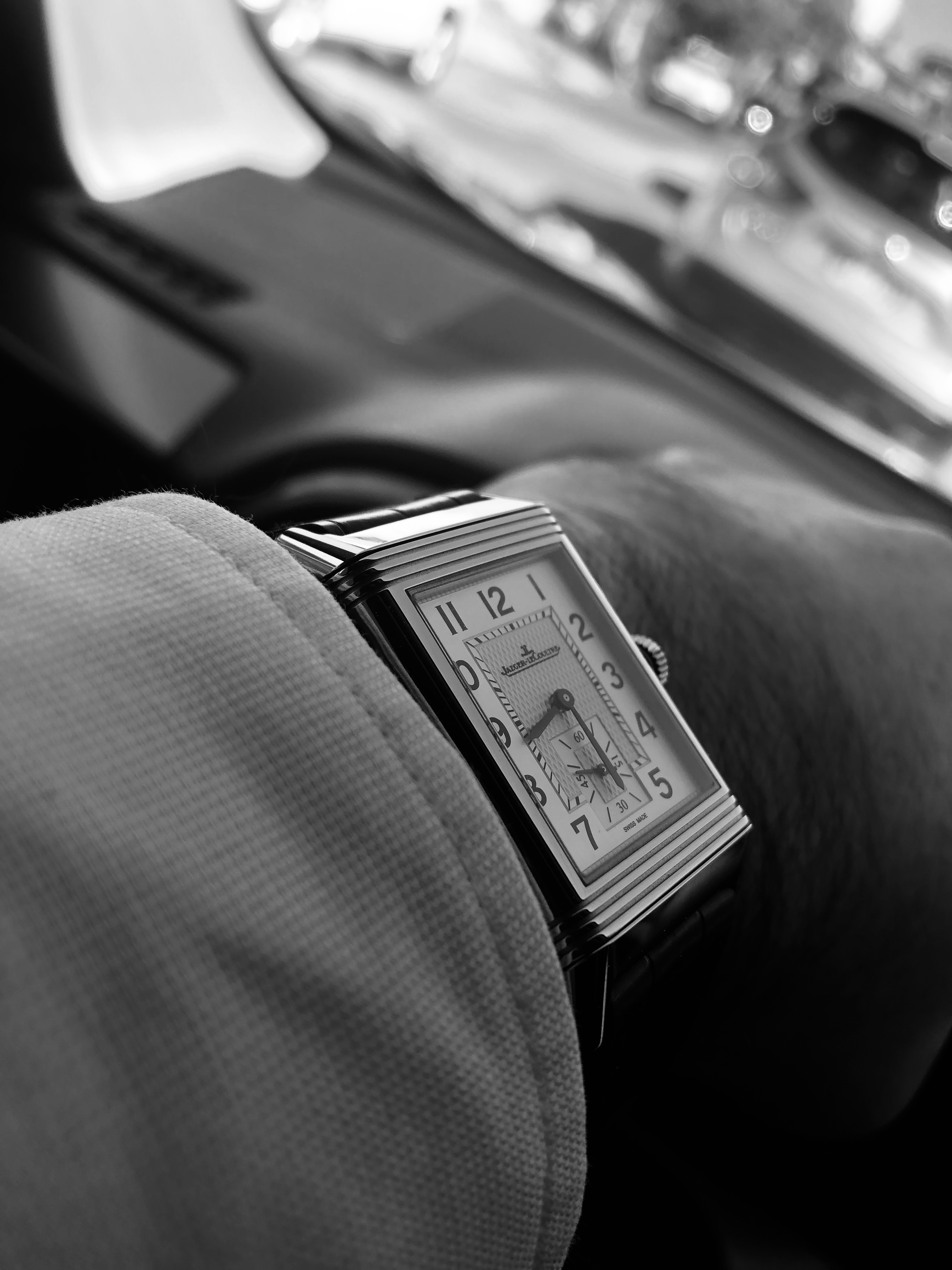
The Reverso watch

Its name inspired by the Latin “I turn around”, the Reverso was created in 1931 as a watch capable of surviving the hard knocks of a polo game. It originated when a group of polo players asked César de Trey, a watch dealer, to create a timepiece that could withstand the rigours of their sport. César de Trey followed up on the request with a letter to his colleague and watch manufacturer, Jacques-David LeCoultre. René-Alfred Chauvot, a French engineer with LeCoultre, was tasked with developing this new watchcase. Mr. Chauvot designed a reversible case that could protect the fragile dial and glass of the watch. The final design, still in use today, allows for the case to be swivelled in its carrier to protect the watch glass. The design is considered a classic of Art Deco.

A list of notable watches from the Reverso line include the following:

- The Reverso Classic Large Duoface Small Second, available in stainless steel.
- The Reverso Tribute Small Seconds Burgundy Red, available in stainless steel.
- The Grande Reverso Ultra Thin Tribute to 1931, available in stainless steel.

=== Duoplan ===
In 1925, the LeCoultre Calibre 7BF Duoplan was created in an effort to bring together miniaturisation and precision. The fashion of the period was for small wristwatches, however small calibres often suffered from a loss of reliability. Created by Henri Rodanet, the technical director of Etablissements Ed. Jaeger, the Duoplan was built on two levels – hence its name – enabling it to maintain a large-size balance.

The Duoplan was also one of the first gem-set steel watches and, in 1929, its glass was replaced with sapphire crystal, a first in watchmaking. The Duoplan was insured by Lloyd's of London with a special after-sales service, and a damaged movement could be replaced in a few minutes, leading London-based store owner Tyme to display in its shop window: “You won’t have time to finish your cigarette before your watch is repaired”.

=== Joaillerie 101 ===
The Duoplan led to the creation in 1929 of the world's still-smallest mechanical movement, the Calibre 101, whose 74 original parts (98 today) weighed a total of approximately one gram. The second family of watches equipped with the Calibre 101, Joaillerie 101 Étrier appeared in the 1930s. In 1953, Elizabeth II of the United Kingdom wore a Jaeger-LeCoultre Calibre 101 wristwatch for her coronation.

=== Atmos ===
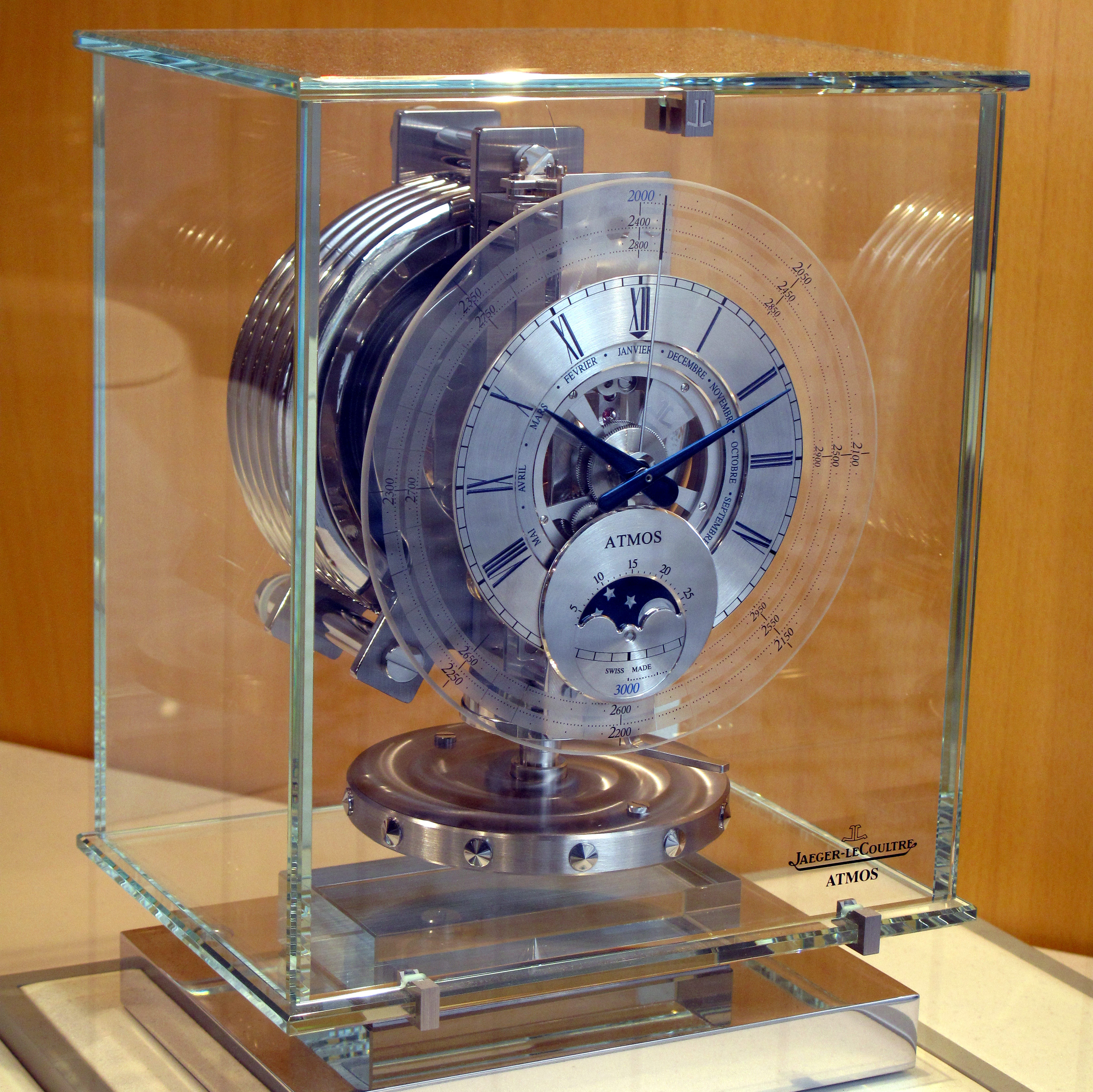
The Atmos

The Atmos Clock is a timepiece of near-perpetual movement needing no human intervention and almost no energy. Invented by Swiss engineer Jean-Léon Reutter in 1928 in Neuchâtel, the Atmos clock has been the Swiss government's official gift for important guests since 1950. Patented in 1928, the first version – known today as the Atmos 1 – was marketed by La Compagnie Générale de Radiologie (CGR) in 1930.

It derives energy from small temperature and atmospheric pressure changes in the environment, and can run for years without human intervention. Wound by a capsule filled with a mixture of temperature-sensitive gases, a 1 °C fluctuation is enough to store sufficient energy to supply the clock with two days' autonomy. Its balance, suspended from a steel-alloy wire thinner than a hair, performs two vibrations per minute; its gearing requires no lubricant. The Atmos' gearing is known for its accuracy: the moon-phase model, for example, accumulates a one-day discrepancy only once every 3,821 years.

The patents were subsequently purchased by Jaeger-LeCoultre in France 1936 and in Switzerland in 1937. The company then spent ten years perfecting the clock before beginning to manufacture it in its current technological form in 1946. In 1988, the Kohler and Rekow design agency created a two-piece limited edition showcase for the clock and, in 2003, the Manufacture released the Atmos Mystérieuse, driven by the Jaeger-LeCoultre Calibre 583 and comprising 1,460 parts.

=== Futurematic ===
In 1951, the Manufacture released the Futurematic, the first automatic movement that lacked the ability to be hand wound, the calibre 497, Calibre 497 debuted with the Jaeger-LeCoultre Futurematic and was much more advanced than the earlier JLC 476 and JLC 481. It features a larger balance for improved accuracy and hacking seconds. One unique feature is a lock that holds the swinging weight in place when the mainspring is fully wound. It also features a special 6 hour power reserve, allowing the watch to immediately function when it is put on, rather than requiring it to be wound first.

The Calibre 497 featured a power reserve indicator along with small seconds located at the unusual position of 3:00. There is no crown on either side of the case. The crown to set the time is on the rear of the case.

Calibre 817 was used in the Jaeger-LeCoultre Futurematic and was a modification of the existing Calibre 497. Like that movement, it has a power reserve indicator at 9:00 and small seconds 3:00, but in Cal. 817 and Cal. 837 these are tiny round windows rather than being full subdials. Calibre 827 returned to the full subdial format.

Calibres 817, 827, and 837 were produced from 1956 through 1958, with just 3,500 movements made. About 3,000 of Cal. 817, 1,000 of Cal. 827, and just 500 of Cal. 837 were made.

Approximately 52,500 examples of Calibre 497 were produced between 1951 and 1958.

It has been said that the whole project for the Futurematic almost made the company bankrupt, as they never fully recovered their investment from sales of the Futurematic series of watches.

=== Memovox ===
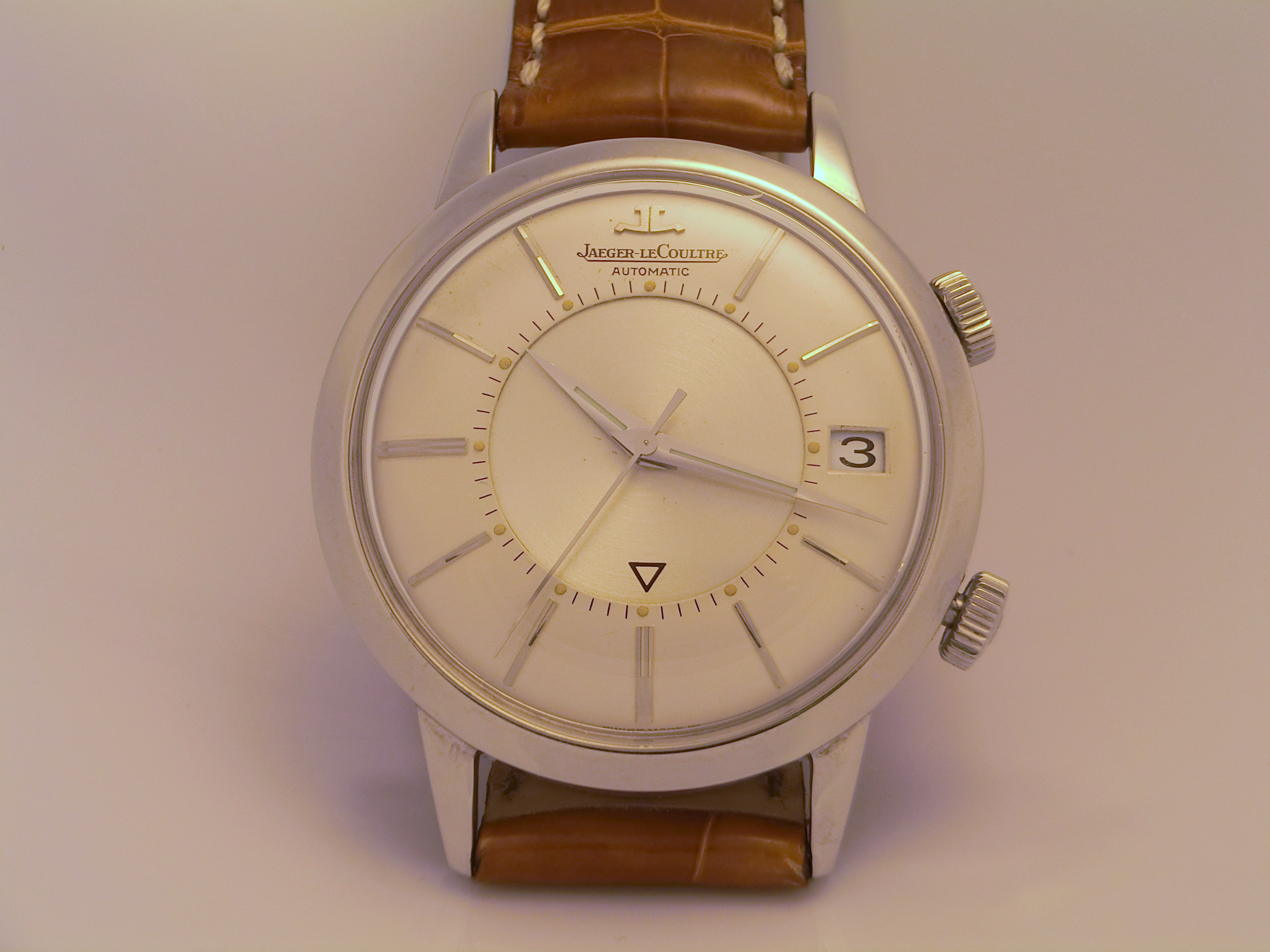
Memovox

In 1950, the Manufacture released the Memovox (portmanteau of memoria and vox, “voice of memory”), a year after the model cricket was released by Vulcain. Its striking mechanism could be used as an alarm for waking up, appointments, timetables, etc. The first models were hand wound and equipped with the Jaeger-LeCoultre Calibre 489.

In 1956, a Memovox featuring the Jaeger-LeCoultre Calibre 815 became the first self-winding alarm watch in history, while shortly thereafter the company marked its 125th anniversary by releasing the Memovox Worldtime. In 1959, the Memovox Deep Sea was equipped with a specific alarm to remind divers to begin their ascension, and in 1965, the Memovox Polaris was released with a patented triple case back to optimise the transmission of sound under water.

The latter model would go on to inspire the current Master Compressor and AMVOX lines. It was reproduced in 2008 under the name Memovox Tribute to Polaris.

=== Geophysic ===
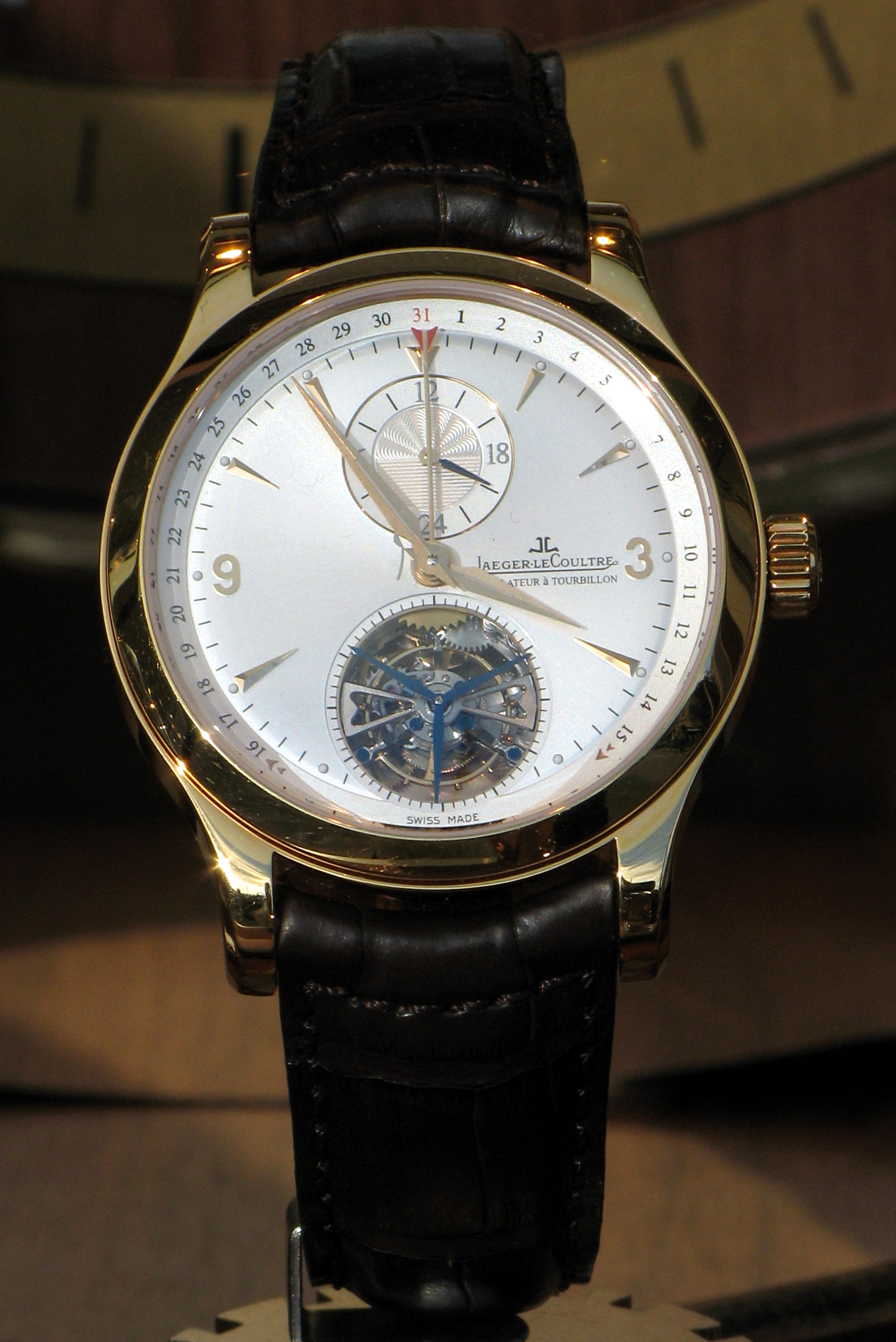
Jaeger-Lecoultre Tourbillon movement watch

In honour of the International Geophysical Year in 1958, Jaeger-LeCoultre created a watch protected against magnetic fields, water and shocks. The Geophysic chronometer was proposed by long-time employee Jules-César Savary as a watch intended for scientific bases in Antarctica. The watch was fitted with the Jaeger-LeCoultre Calibre 478BWS and featured seventeen jewels, a Breguet overcoil, a regulating spring on the balance-cock, a shock-absorber and a Glucydur balance. The year of its release, the Geophysic was offered to William R. Anderson, the captain of the Nautilus, the first American nuclear submarine to travel between the Pacific and Atlantic oceans via the North Pole.

=== Grand Complication ===
JLC produces some complicated watches (Grand complication), e.g. the Master Gyrotourbillon 1 with a spherical Tourbillon. The Duomètre Sphérotourbillon is equipped with a tourbillon adjustable to the nearest second; the Reverso Répétition Minutes à Rideau is equipped with a minute-repeater shutter as a third face covering one of its two dials; the Master Grande Tradition Grande Complication is equipped with a flying tourbillon that follows the rhythm of celestial phenomena and indicates sidereal time, and a minute repeater comprising cathedral gongs; the Hybris Mechanica à Grande Sonnerie is equipped with gongs capable of playing the entire Big Ben chime; the Reverso Gyrotourbillon 2 is equipped with a spherical tourbillon principle, a reversible case and a cylindrical balance; the Master Compressor Extreme LAB is oil-free; the Gyrotourbillon 1 is equipped with a tourbillon evolving in three dimensions to compensate for the effects of gravity in all positions.

== Notable patrons and owners ==
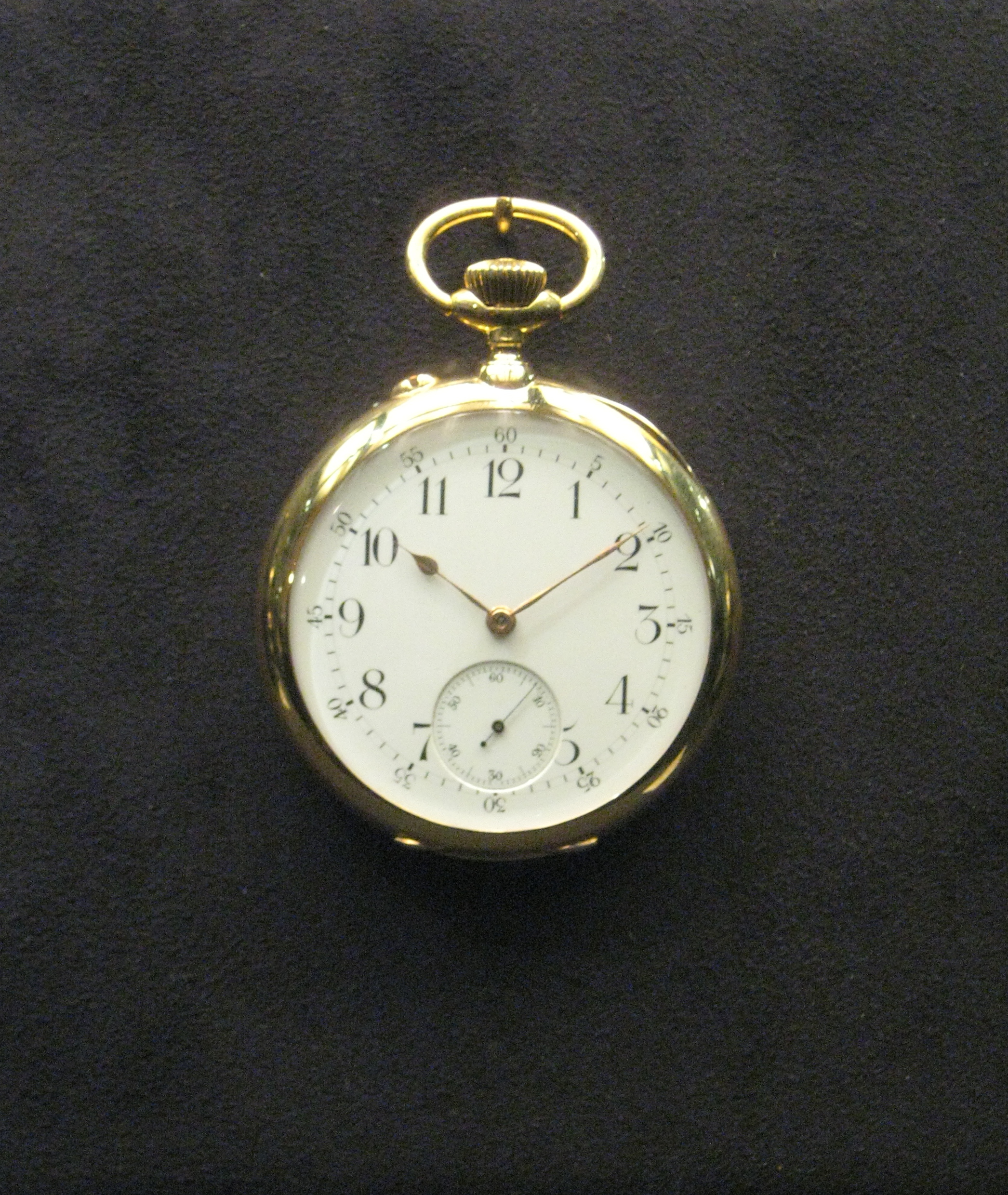
A Jaeger-LeCoultre pocket watch

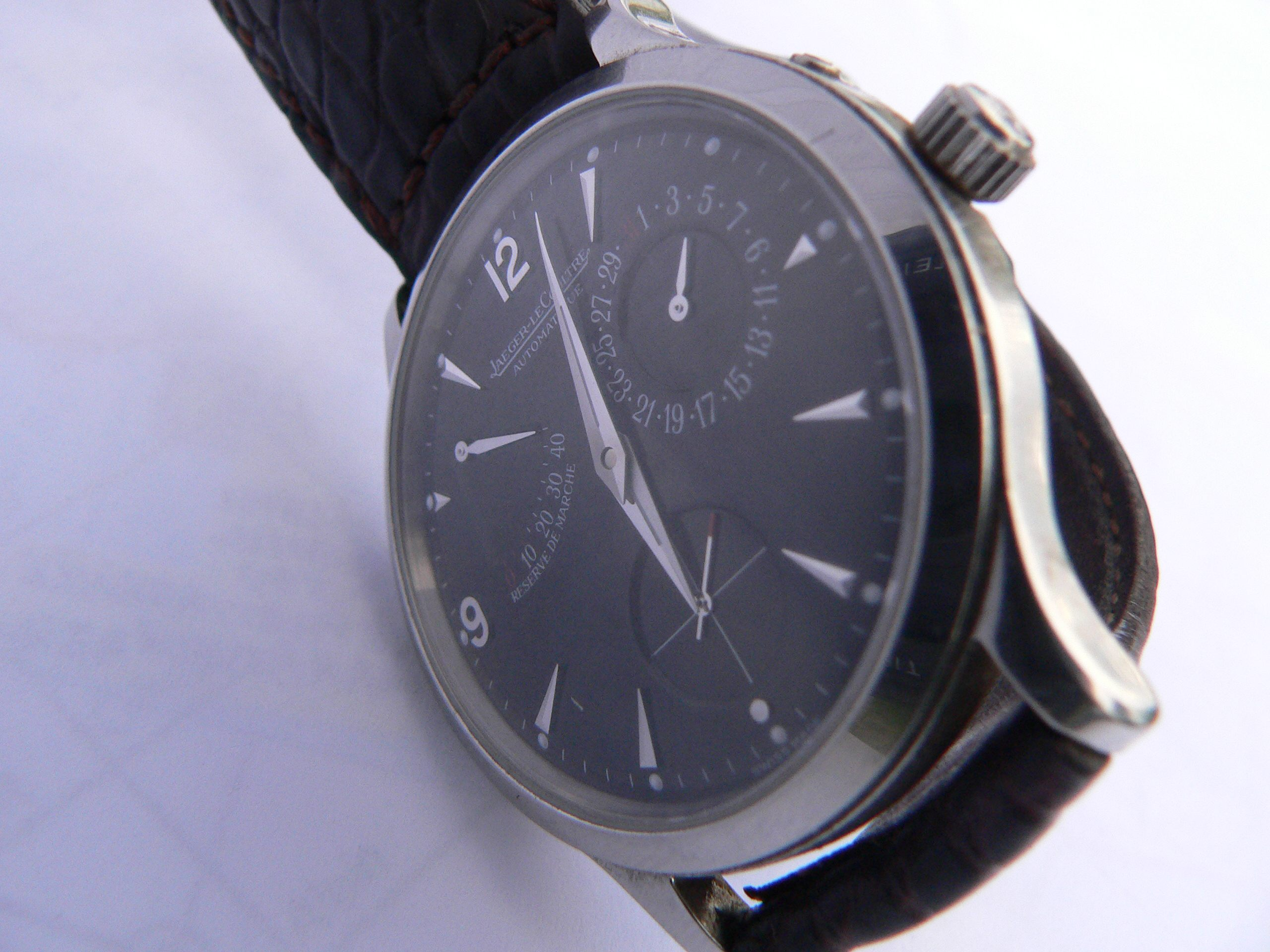
Jaeger-Lecoultre mechanical automatic movement watch with day of the month complication and power reserve indicator

=== Artists ===
- Charlie Chaplin, English comic actor & filmmaker
- Pablo Picasso, Spanish artist

=== Celebrities and Musicians ===
- Benedict Cumberbatch, English actor
- Pierce Brosnan, Irish actor
- Steve McQueen, American actor
- Leonardo DiCaprio, American actor
- Robert Downey, Jr., American actor
- Robin Williams, American actor
- Kit Harington, English actor
- Jay Z, American rapper
- Amanda Seyfried, American actress
- Stromae, Belgian Artist
- John Mills, English actor
- Meryl Streep, American actress
- Eddie Van Halen, Dutch American musician

=== Adventure and Sports ===
- Amelia Earhart, aviation pioneer & author
- Carlo Ancelotti, Football Manager & player
- Ronnie O'Sullivan, Snooker Champion

=== Politicians ===
- Winston Churchill, British Statesman and soldier
- Lyndon B. Johnson, 36th President of the United States
- Bill Clinton, 42nd President of the United States
- Douglas MacArthur, American Five-star General
- Salvador Allende, 28th President of Chile (1970-1973).

=== Royalty ===
- Edward VIII, King of the United Kingdom and Duke of Windsor
- Elizabeth II, Queen of the United Kingdom

== Sponsorship and philanthropy ==
Since 1931, Jaeger-LeCoultre has held close ties with the equestrian sports community and counts the Polo Club de Veytay as one of its partners.

In 2004, Jaeger-LeCoultre teamed with Aston Martin to launch the Aston Martin Jaeger-LeCoultre gentleman's watch - the AMVOX1. The design of the timepiece was inspired by a 70-year historical link between the two companies. The dashboard of the 1930s, 1.5-litre Aston Martin LM – a regular class winner in international motorsport – contained instruments created by Jaeger-LeCoultre.

In October 2011, the Responsible Jewellery Council announced that Jaeger-LeCoultre had obtained certification for its commitment to human rights and for meeting the ethical, social and environmental standards established by the RJC's Member Certification system. Jérôme Lambert, who had served as Jaeger-LeCoultre's CEO from 2002 to 2013 before going on to lead Montblanc and later the Richemont Group as a whole (2018–2024), returned to the Maison as CEO effective 1 January 2025, succeeding Catherine Rénier, who moved to lead Van Cleef & Arpels.

In 2012, in partnership with the Italian luxury leathergoods brand Valextra, Jaeger-LeCoultre began offering a two-tone version of its ladies’ Reverso watch.

Jaeger-LeCoultre and the International Herald Tribune have joined forces with UNESCO's World Heritage Centre in support of the World Heritage Marine Programme. The partnership provides funding and media exposure for one of the World Heritage Committee's priority programmes, leading to the listing of new marine sites and protection measures for the 46 sites already listed. Each year, the programme as well as the sites are featured in print and online news articles by the International Herald Tribune, thus offering increased visibility to the partnership.

In addition, the company partners with the Venice Film Festival to present the Jaeger-LeCoultre Glory to the Filmmaker Award.

== In popular culture ==
Charli xcx used the name of the brand in the lyrics to “Card Declined” from “Music, Fashion, Film” album.

== See also ==
- List of watch manufacturers
- Manufacture d'horlogerie
- Atmos clock
- Jaeger-LeCoultre Gold Cup
