= Reference 57260 =

Complicated mechanical pocket watch

The Vacheron Constantin Reference 57260
- Manufacturer: Vacheron Constantin
- Also called: 57260
- Type: Pocket watch
- Display: Analogue (2 dials)
- Introduced: 2015
- Movement: Mechanical

The Reference 57260 is a single highly complicated mechanical pocket watch introduced by Vacheron Constantin in 2015. Displaying the Gregorian, Judaic, and lunar calendars featuring 57 complications, it has been called "the Most Complicated Watch in the World" by Hodinkee. Vacheron Constantin announced that Reference 57260 was the most complicated mechanical pocket watch ever created at the time, succeeding the Patek Philippe Calibre 89, assembled in 1989 and featuring 33 complications. The Reference 57260 took eight years to assemble. The watch has 2,826 parts and 31 hands, weighs 957 grams (33.8 oz) and has a diameter of 98 millimetres (3.9 in).

The Reference 57260 is one of Vacheron Constantin's tailor-made pocket watches with grand complications. Members of the lineage include James W. Packard's minute repeating pocket watch (1918), which was auctioned for US$1.763 million by Christie's in New York on 15 June 2011, and King Fuad I's pocket watch No. 402833 (1929), which ranks among some of the most expensive watches sold at auction, fetching US$2.77 million (3,306,250 CHF) in Geneva on April 3, 2005. In addition, in 1946 Vacheron Constantin made a customized pocket watch for King Farouk of Egypt, the successor of King Fuad I, and in 1948 the company tailored another pocket watch for Count Guy de Boisrouvray of France.

== Price ==
The price agreed between the company and the client is confidential and has not been officially disclosed; however, various sources estimate the price to be in excess of $US10 million. It was built for a single customer, whose details are kept confidential and is only described as "A major watch collector".

== Technical specifications ==
- Reference: 57260/000G-B046
- Material: White gold
- Diameter: 98 mm
- Thickness: 50.55 mm
- Caliber: 3750
- Diameter: 72 mm
- Thickness: 36 mm
- Number of components: Over 2,800
- Number of jewels: 242
- Frequency: 2.5 Hz / 18,000 vibrations per hour
- Power reserve: 60 hours
- Number of complications: 57

== Fifty-seven complications by function ==
=== Time measurement (6 functions) ===
1. Hours, minutes, seconds, average solar time (regulator)
2. Three-shaft tourbillon
3. Tourbillon regulator with spherical balance spring
4. 12-hour time zone, second hours and minutes time zone
5. 24-city display for each time zone
6. Day/night indication for 12-hour time zone

=== Perpetual calendar (7 functions) ===
1. Gregorian perpetual calendar
2. Gregorian day name
3. Gregorian month name
4. Gregorian retrograde date
5. Leap year and four-year cycle display
6. Number of the day of the week (ISO 8601 calendar)
7. Week to view (ISO 8601 calendar)

=== Hebrew calendar (8 functions) ===
1. Hebrew perpetual calendar and 19-year cycle
2. Hebrew day number
3. Hebrew month name
4. Hebrew date
5. Hebrew secular calendar
6. Hebrew century, decade and year
7. Age of Hebrew year (12 or 13 months)
8. Golden number (19 years)

=== Astrological calendar (9 functions) ===
1. Seasons, equinoxes, solstices and signs of the Zodiac indicated by the hand on the sun
2. Star chart (for the owner's city)
3. Sidereal time hours
4. Sidereal time minutes
5. Equation of time
6. Sunrise times (for the owner's city)
7. Sunset times (for the owner's city)
8. Length of day (for the owner's city)
9. Length of night (for the owner's city)

=== Lunar calendar (1 function) ===
1. Moon phases and age (one correction every 1,027 years)

=== 3-column wheel chronograph (4 functions) ===
1. Retrograde seconds chronograph (one column wheel)
2. Retrograde split-seconds chronograph (one column wheel)
3. Hours counter (one column wheel)
4. Minutes counter

=== Alarm (7 functions) ===
1. Alarm with its own gong and gradual striking
2. Alarm strike / silence indicator
3. Choice of normal alarm or carillon striking alarm indicator
4. Alarm mechanism coupled to the carillon striking mechanism
5. Alarm striking with choice of Grande or Petite Sonnerie
6. Alarm power-reserve indication
7. System to disengage the striking mechanism when alarm barrel fully unwound

=== Westminster carillon striking (8 functions) ===
1. Westminster carillon chiming with 5 gongs and 5 hammers
2. Grande Sonnerie passing strike
3. Petite Sonnerie passing strike
4. Minute repeating
5. Night silence feature (10 p.m. to 8 a.m.)
6. System to disengage the striking barrel when fully wound
7. Indication for Grande or Petite Sonnerie modes
8. Indication for silence / striking / night modes

=== Others (6 functions) ===
1. Movement power reserve indicator
2. Power-reserve indication for the striking train
3. Winding crown position indicator
4. Dual barrel winding system
5. Time setting in two positions and two directions
6. Secret mechanism (opening of the button for alarm arbor)

== Other complicated watches ==
- Audemars Piguet Code 11.59 Universelle (2023) — 23 complications
- Patek Philippe Calibre 89 (1989) — 33 complications
- Patek Philippe Henry Graves Supercomplication (1933) — 24 complications
