= List of most expensive watches sold at auction =

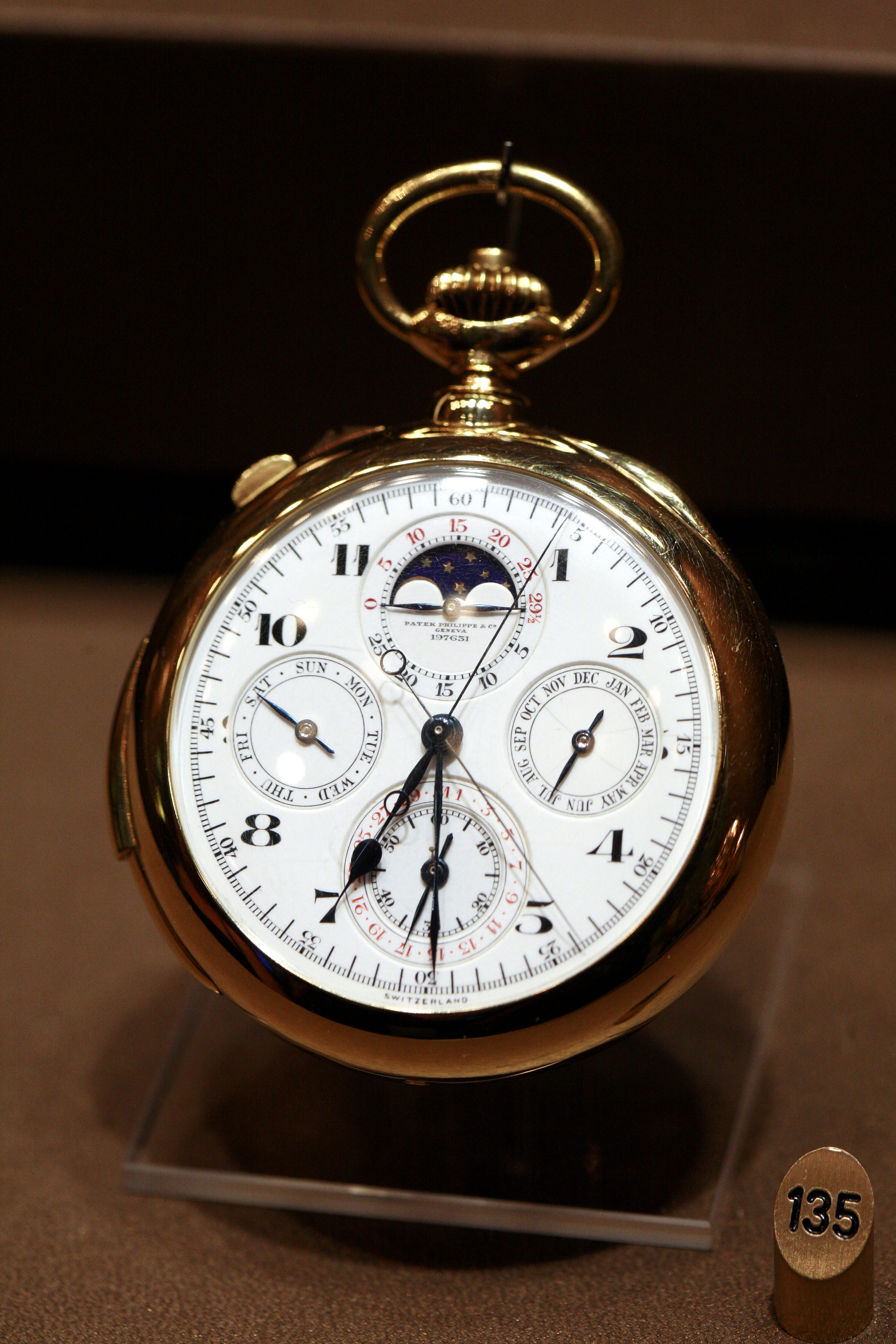
A Patek Philippe pocket watch

This list of most expensive watches sold at auction documents the watches sold at auction worldwide for at least 1.5 million US dollars. The final price listed is the total price paid by the buyer converted to US dollars, according to the currency exchange rate at the time of auction. This price is the aggregate of the hammer price (i.e., the winning bid or sale price at the auction) plus any buyer's premium paid to the auction houses (where levied, and in accordance with the rates charged by the relevant auction house). While the rates of buyer's vary between auction houses (which rates can also vary within each auction house based on the nature of the lot and its value), most auction houses publish their results inclusive of the buyer's premium, and so the rankings which follow are based on the aggregated price paid by the buyer: for the watch itself (the hammer or sale price) and for the auction house's services and administrative costs (the buyer's premium). Inflation-adjusted prices are also listed for reference. If a watch has been sold at auction for several times, only the highest final price is included. Finally, any auctioned watch without public online records from auctioneers (e.g. major auction houses) will not be included in the ranking.

As of December 2022, the most expensive watch (and wristwatch) ever sold at auction is the Patek Philippe Grandmaster Chime Ref. 6300A-010, fetching US$31.19 million (31,000,000 CHF) in Geneva on 9 November 2019. The most expensive pocket watch ever sold at auction is the Patek Philippe Henry Graves Supercomplication, fetching US$23.98 million (23,237,000 CHF) in Geneva on 11 November 2014.

As of December 2022, at least 115 timepieces have been sold at auction for over US$2 million, and at least 173 timepieces have been sold at auction for over $1.5 million. Among the top 10 of these watches, nine are Patek Philippe timepieces and one is a Rolex.

== Summary (as of December 2022) ==
=== Auction records ===
- Worldwide (and Europe): The most expensive watch ever sold at auction worldwide is the Patek Philippe Grandmaster Chime Ref. 6300A-010, which fetched $31.19 million (31,000,000 CHF) in Geneva on 9 November 2019 (by Christie's).
- Asia: The most expensive watch ever sold at auction in Asia is the Patek Philippe Gobbi Milano Double Signed "Heures Universelles" Ref. 2523, which fetched $8.97 million (70,175,000 HKD) in Hong Kong on 23 November 2019 (by Christie's).
- North America: The most expensive watch ever sold at auction in North America is Paul Newman's Rolex Daytona, which fetched $17.75 million in New York on 26 October 2017 (by Phillips).

=== Auction houses ===
The following table shows the breakdown of auction houses that have sold the most expensive watches at auctions (for at least US$2 million). As of December 2022, there are at least six auction houses that have sold watches for no less than $2 million: Christie's, Phillips, Antiquorum, Sotheby's, Poly Auction, and Monaco Legend Auctions.

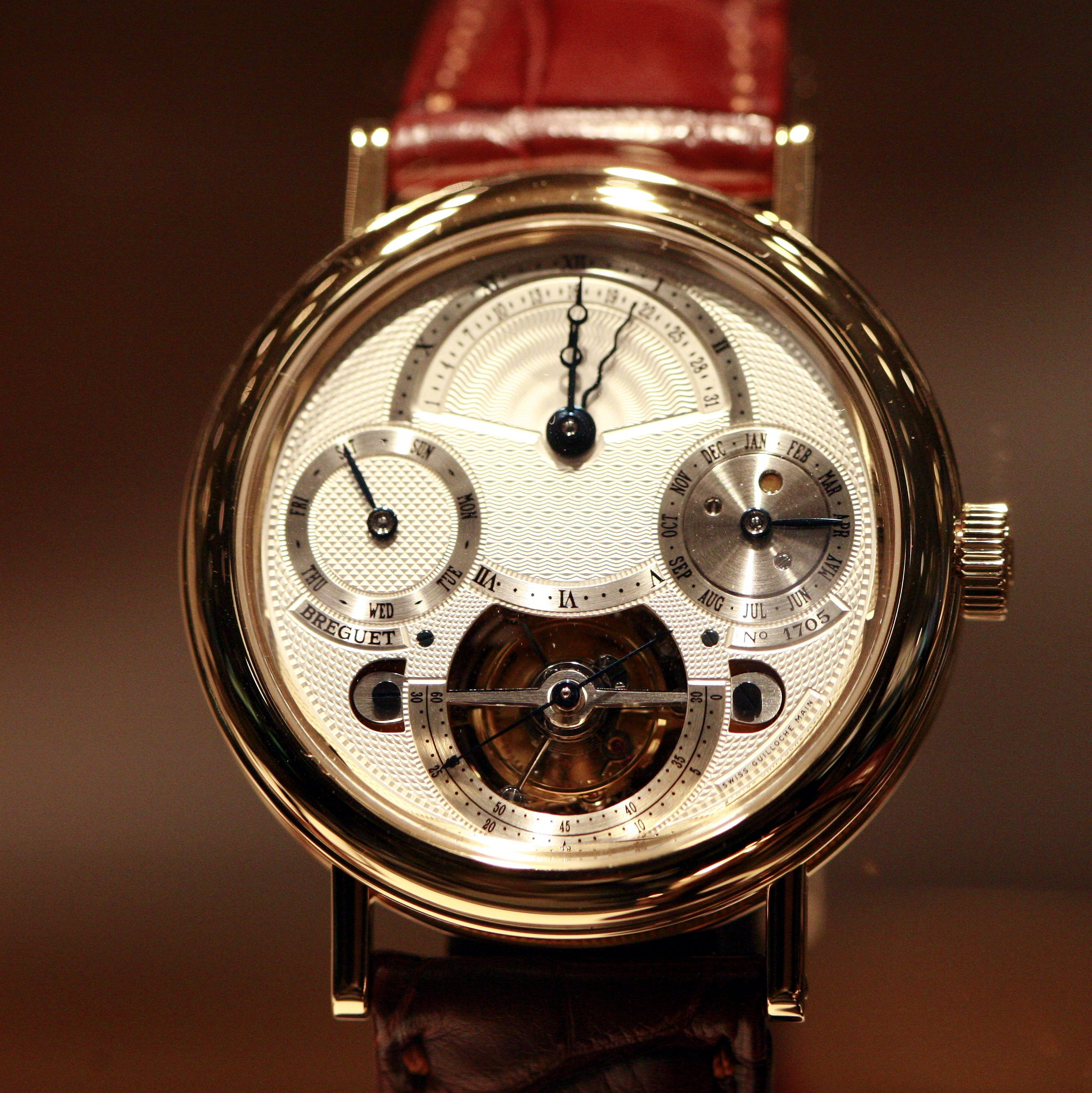
Breguet No. 1705 tourbillon wristwatch

Ranking range	Phillips	Christie's	Sotheby's	Antiquorum	Monaco Legend Auctions	Poly Auction	Audemars Piguet auction for charity
1st – 115th	45	40	17	9	2	1	1

The following table has a threshold of 1.50 US dollars.

Ranking range	Phillips	Christie's	Sotheby's	Antiquorum	Monaco Legend Auctions	Poly Auction	RR Auction	Loupe This	Audemars Piguet auction for charity
1st – 173rd	65	60	24	18	2	1	1	1	1

=== Manufacturers ===
The following table shows the brand breakdown of the most expensive watches ever sold at auction (for at least US$1.5 million). As of December 2022, there are 19 manufacturers that have manufactured watches that qualify: Patek Philippe, Rolex, Breguet, Audemars Piguet, Philippe Dufour, F. P. Journe, George Daniels, Richard Mille, URWERK, Zenith, Vacheron Constantin, Omega, Tag Heuer, Chopard, Bulova, Cartier and Attributed to Piguet & Capt.

Among these brands, Philippe Dufour, F.P. Journe, George Daniels, Richard Mille, URWERK and Piguet & Capt are independent watchmakers.

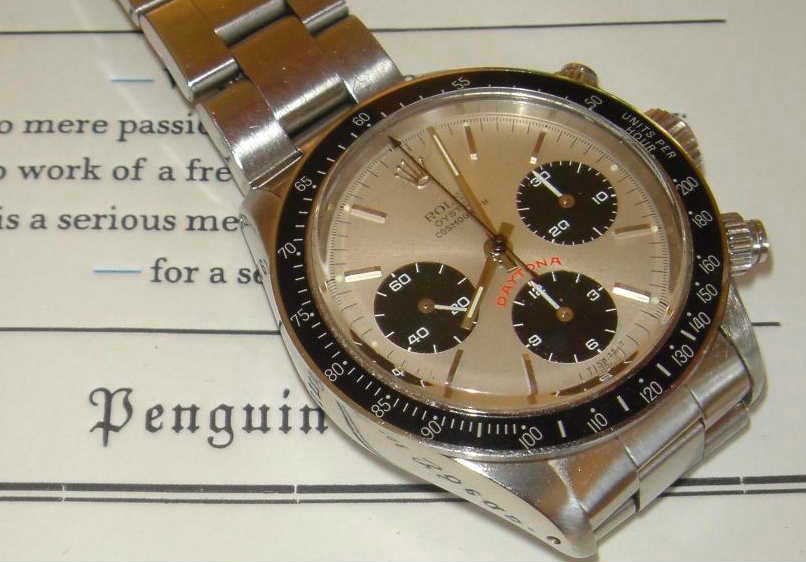
A Rolex Daytona Ref. 6263 wristwatch

Rank	Manufacturer	Piece(s)
1	Patek Philippe	114
2	Rolex	22
3	George Daniels	6
4	Breguet	4
4	F. P. Journe	4
4	Philippe Dufour	4
7	Audemars Piguet	3
7	Richard Mille	3
7	Vacheron Constantin	3
10	Omega	2
11	Bulova	1
11	Cartier	1
11	Chopard	1
11	Jehan Cremsdorff	1
11	Attributed to Piguet & Capt	1
11	Tag Heuer	1
11	URWERK	1
11	Zenith	1

== Ranked list (as of December 2022) ==
The following table contains details of the 173 timepieces auctioned for at least US$1.5 million, ranked according to their original auction prices. The inflation-adjusted price is given by consumer price index inflation-adjusted value of United States dollars in 2025.

Rank	Manufacturer	Watch model	M.Y.	Style	Price (USD millions)		Auction date	Auction place	Auction house	Ref.
Rank	Manufacturer	Watch model	M.Y.	Style	Original	Inflation- adjusted	Auction date	Auction place	Auction house	Ref.
1	Patek Philippe	Grandmaster Chime Ref. 6300A-010	2019	Wrist	31.000	39.282	11/09/2019	Geneva	Christie's	
2	Patek Philippe	Henry Graves Supercomplication	1932	Pocket	23.983	32.617	11/11/2014	Geneva	Sotheby's	
3	Rolex	Paul Newman Daytona Ref. 6239	1968	Wrist	17.753	23.318	10/26/2017	New York	Phillips	
4	Patek Philippe	Stainless Steel Ref. 1518	1943	Wrist	11.137	14.940	11/12/2016	Geneva	Phillips	
5	Patek Philippe	Prince Mohammed Tewfik A. Toussou Pink Gold Ref. 1518 with French calendar	1948	Wrist	9.570	9.570	12/09/2021	New York	Sotheby's	
6	Patek Philippe	Gobbi Milan "Heures Universelles" Ref. 2523	1953	Wrist	8.967	11.292	11/23/2019	Hong Kong	Christie's	
7	Patek Philippe	Two-Crown Worldtime Ref. 2523 Eurasia	1953	Wrist	7.682	9.557	05/08/2021	Geneva	Phillips	
8	Patek Philippe	Gobbi Milano Pink Gold Ref. 2499	1957	Wrist	7.680	8.45	25/04/2022	Hong Kong	Sotheby's	
9	Patek Philippe	Stainless Steel Ref. 5016A-010	2015	Wrist	7.259	9.860	11/07/2015	Geneva	Phillips	
10	Patek Philippe	Nautilus Ref. 5711/1A-018 Tiffany & Co	2021	Wrist	6.503	7.73	12/11/2021	New York	Phillips (Bacs & Russo)	
11	Patek Philippe	Titanium Ref. 5208T-010	2017	Wrist	6.226	8.178	11/11/2017	Geneva	Christie's	
12	Rolex	Daytona Unicorn Ref. 6265	1970	Wrist	5.937	7.612	05/12/2018	Geneva	Phillips	
13	Patek Philippe	Gold Chronograph Ref. 1527	1943	Wrist	5.709	8.429	05/10/2010	Geneva	Christie's	
14	Patek Philippe	Worldtimer Guilloché Ref. 2523/1	1954	Wrist	5.553	6.908	11/06/2020	Geneva	Phillips	
15	Rolex	Paul Newman Big Red Daytona Ref. 6263	1980	Wrist	5.475	6.811	12/12/2020	New York	Phillips	
16	Philippe Dufour	Grande et Petite Sonnerie No.1	1992	Wrist	5.210	5.210	11/05/2021	Geneva	Phillips	
17	Audemars Piguet	Royal Oak Concept Black Panther Flying Tourbillon Unique Piece Ref. 26620IO	2021	Wrist	5.200	6.18	04/10/2021	Los Angeles	Audemars Piguet	
18	Rolex	Emperor Bảo Đại Ref. 6062	1952	Wrist	5.060	6.646	05/13/2017	Geneva	Phillips	
19	Patek Philippe	Yellow Gold Calibre 89	1989	Pocket	5.042	7.567	11/14/2009	Geneva	Antiquorum	
20	Patek Philippe	White Gold Calibre 89	1989	Pocket	5.003	8.528	04/24/2004	Geneva	Antiquorum	
21	Patek Philippe	Stainless Steel Ref. 130	1927	Wrist	4.987	6.774	05/10/2015	Geneva	Phillips	
22	F. P. Journe	F. P. Journe x Francis Ford Coppola FFC Blue	2021	Wrist	4.934	5.86	11/06/2021	Geneva	Christie's	
23	Breguet	Breguet & Fils, Paris No. 2667	1814	Pocket	4.686	6.572	05/14/2012	Geneva	Christie's	
24	Patek Philippe	Henry Graves Minute Repeater	1895 (case in 1927) (Note: The movement was manufactured in 1895 and the case in 1927.)	Wrist	4.607	5.801	11/11/2019	Geneva	Christie's	
25	George Daniels	Yellow Gold Space Traveller's I	1982	Pocket	4.561	5.744	07/02/2019	London	Sotheby's	
26	George Daniels	Yellow Gold Space Traveller's II	1982	Pocket	4.325	5.681	11/19/2017	London	Sotheby's	
27	F. P. Journe	Chronomètre à Résonance "Souscription" 001/00R	2000	Wrist	4.278	4.278	11/07/2021	Geneva	Phillips	
28	George Daniels	Spring Case Tourbillon	1992	Wrist	4.096	4.506	05/11/2022 - 06/11/2022	Geneva	Phillips	
29	Patek Philippe	Platinum World Time Ref. 1415	1939	Wrist	4.027	7.208	04/13/2002	Geneva	Antiquorum	
30	Philippe Dufour	Duality No.8	1996	Wrist	4.001	4.001	11/07/2021	Geneva	Phillips	
31	Patek Philippe	J.B. Champion Ref. 2458	1952	Wrist	3.993	5.600	11/12/2012	Geneva	Christie's	
32	Patek Philippe	Titanium Ref. 5004T	2013	Wrist	3.985	5.508	09/28/2013	Monaco	Antiquorum	
33	Patek Philippe	Stainless Steel Ref. 1526	1949	Wrist	3.956	5.916	05/12/2008	Geneva	Christie's	
34	Patek Philippe	Serpico y Laino Yellow Gold Ref. 2499	1952	Wrist	3.882	3.882	11/05/2021	Geneva	Phillips	
35	Patek Philippe	Asprey Yellow Gold Ref. 2499	1952	Wrist	3.880	4.975	11/13/2018	Geneva	Sotheby's	
35	F. P. Journe	Tourbillon Souverain à Remontoir d'Egalité "Souscription" 001/99T	1999	Wrist	3.880	3.880	11/06/2021	Geneva	Phillips	
37	Patek Philippe	Alan Banbery Senza Luna Ref. 3448J Prototype with Leap Year Indication	1970 (encased in 1975) (Note: The movement was manufactured in 1970 and the watch was encased in 1975.)	Wrist	3.742	3.742	05/22/2021	Hong Kong	Christie's	
38	Rolex	Daytona Oyster Ref. 6263	1969	Wrist	3.718	4.883	05/14/2017	Geneva	Phillips	
39	Patek Philippe	Calatravone Stainless Steel Ref. 570	1942	Wrist	3.668	3.668	05/09/2021	Geneva	Phillips	
40	Patek Philippe	Eric Clapton Ref. 2499/100	1987	Wrist	3.656	5.127	11/12/2012	Geneva	Christie's	
41	Patek Philippe	White Gold Chronograph	1928	Wrist	3.636	5.204	05/16/2011	Geneva	Christie's	
42	Patek Philippe	Jean-Claude Biver Pink Gold Ref. 1518	1948	Wrist	3.567	4.438	06/27/2020	Geneva	Phillips	
43	Omega	~~Speedmaster "Broad Arrow" Ref. 2915-1~~ Potential Fake, Omega pressed charges in 2023.	1957	Wrist	3.418	3.418	11/05/2021	Geneva	Phillips	
44	Audemars Piguet	Royal Oak “Jumbo” Extra-Thin Only Watch Ref. 15202XT	2021	Wrist	3.399	4.04	11/06/2021	Geneva	Christie's	
45	Breguet	Breguet & Fils, No. 217	1800	Pocket		4.878	05/16/2016	Geneva	Christie's	
46	Patek Philippe	Pink Ref. 1518	1947	Wrist	3.330	3.67	08/05/2022	Geneva	Phillips	
47	Patek Philippe	Stainless Steel Ref. 1436	1945	Wrist	3.301	4.484	11/07/2015	Geneva	Phillips	
48	Patek Philippe	Star Calibre 2000 Ref. 990/1	2008	Pocket	3.281	4.601	11/28/2012	Hong Kong	Christie's	
49	Rolex	Rolex Daytona Lapis Lazuli Platinum Ref. 16516	1999	Wrist	3.270	4.068	07/12/2020	Hong Kong	Sotheby's	
50	Patek Philippe	Serpico y Laino Gold Ref. 2499	1952	Wrist	3.235	4.148	11/12/2018	Geneva	Christie's	
51	Rolex	Daytona Turquoise Hardstone Lacquer Ref. 16516	1998	Wrist	3.139	3.139	04/23/2021	Hong Kong	Sotheby's	
52	Patek Philippe	Sky Moon Tourbillon Ref. 5002R-001	2010	Wrist	3.114	3.43	24/05/2022	Hong Kong	Christie's	
53	Patek Philippe	White Gold Ref. 2497	1954	Wrist	3.083	3.083	11/05/2021	Geneva	Phillips	
54	Patek Philippe	Platinum Ref. 2497	1954	Wrist	3.067	4.586	05/12/2008	Geneva	Christie's	
55	Rolex	Daytona Neanderthal Ref. 6240	1966	Wrist	3.010	3.859	05/12/2018	Geneva	Phillips	
56	Patek Philippe	Tiffany & Co. Ref. 2499	1971	Wrist	2.999	3.845	10/02/2018	Hong Kong	Sotheby's	
57	Patek Philippe	Gold World Time Ref. 2523	1955	Wrist	2.990	4.193	05/14/2012	Geneva	Christie's	
58	Patek Philippe	Yellow Gold Luminous Ref. 2499	1958	Wrist	2.977	3.28	25/04/2022	Hong Kong	Sotheby's	
59	Patek Philippe	Yellow Gold Split-seconds Chronograph	1923	Wrist	2.965	4.032	06/10/2014	New York	Sotheby's	
60	Patek Philippe	Two-Crown Worldtime Ref. 2523 with Guilloché Gold Dial	1953	Wrist	2.910	2.910	11/08/2021	Geneva	Christie's	
61	URWERK	Atomic Master Clock & Titanium Wristwatch	2018	Wrist	2.900	3.652	12/10/2019	New York	Phillips	
61	Patek Philippe	Pink Gold Ref. 1518	1958	Wrist	2.900	3.19	25/04/2022	Hong Kong	Sotheby's	
63	Patek Philippe	Emperor Haile Selassie Ref. 2497	1954	Wrist	2.898	3.806	05/15/2017	Geneva	Christie's	
64	Patek Philippe	Yellow Gold World Time Ref. 2523	1953	Wrist	2.857	3.752	11/28/2017	Hong Kong	Phillips	
65	Patek Philippe	Pink Gold Ref. 2499	1971	Wrist	2.782	3.654	11/11/2017	Geneva	Phillips	
66	Patek Philippe	Gold Ref. 1526	1942 (case in 1948) (Note: The movement was manufactured in 1942 and the case in 1948.)	Wrist	2.773	4.161	11/16/2009	Geneva	Christie's	
67	Vacheron Constantin	King Fuad I No. 402833	1929	Pocket	2.77	4.57	04/03/2005	Geneva	Antiquorum	
68	Breguet	Breguet, Paris, No. 4111	1827	Pocket	2.751	3.858	05/14/2012	Geneva	Christie's	
68	Patek Philippe	Pink Gold Ref. 2499	1950	Wrist	2.751	3.858	05/14/2012	Geneva	Christie's	
70	Patek Philippe	Tiffany & Co. Yellow Gold Ref. 2523/1	1963	Wrist	2.747	3.02	22/10/2022	Monaco	Monaco Legend Auctions	
71	Patek Philippe	Jean-Claude Biver Yellow Gold Ref. 2499	1957	Wrist	2.743	3.412	06/28/2020	Geneva	Phillips	
72	Jehan Cremsdorff	Gold, Enamel and Diamond-set Verge Watch	1650	Pocket	2.734	3.443	07/03/2019	London	Sotheby's	
73	Patek Philippe	Gobbi Milan World Time Ref. 2523	1953	Wrist	2.728	4.028	11/15/2010	Geneva	Christie's	
74	Patek Philippe	Pink Gold Ref. 2499 with German Calendar	1957	Wrist	2.722	2.722	05/09/2021	Geneva	Phillips	
75	Patek Philippe	White Gold Ref. 6002G	2014	Wrist	2.717	3.484	10/03/2018	Hong Kong	Poly Auction	
76	Patek Philippe	Pink Gold Ref. 2499	1951	Wrist	2.678	3.642	11/09/2014	Geneva	Christie's	
77	Philippe Dufour	Grande et Petite Sonnerie No.1 Piece Unique	1989	Pocket	2.553	2.553	11/07/2021	Geneva	Phillips	
78	Patek Philippe	Pink Gold Ref. 2499	1968	Wrist	2.538	3.405	05/31/2016	Hong Kong	Phillips	
79	Patek Philippe	Pink Gold World Time Ref. 2523/1	1954	Wrist	2.509	3.366	05/31/2016	Hong Kong	Phillips	
80	Patek Philippe	Ref. 3974	1990	Wrist	2.498	2.75	27/05/2022	Hong Kong	Phillips	
81	Patek Philippe	Gradowski Clockwatch	1890	Pocket	2.48	4.44	06/08/2002	Hong Kong	Antiquorum	
82	Patek Philippe	White Gold Ref. 6002G	2016	Wrist	2.470	3.110	11/23/2019	Hong Kong	Christie's	
83	Rolex	Antimagnetique 4113	1942	Wrist	2.466	3.308	05/14/2016	Geneva	Phillips	
84	George Daniels	Grand Complication	1987	Pocket	2.391	3.011	05/12/2019	Geneva	Phillips	
85	George Daniels	Anniversary in platinum No. 00	2019	Wrist	2.389	3.419	11/06/2022 - 12/06/2022	New York	Phillips	
86	Patek Philippe	Freccero Pink Gold Ref. 3448	1968	Wrist	2.338	3.346	11/14/2011	Geneva	Christie's	
87	Patek Philippe	White Gold Ref. 5002G-010	2012	Wrist	2.320	2.922	11/25/2019	Hong Kong	Phillips	
88	Richard Mille	Charles Leclerc RM67-02 Prototype	2021	Wrist	2.302	2.74	11/06/2021	Geneva	Christie's	
89	Patek Philippe	White Gold Ref. 2497	1954	Wrist	2.300	3.021	11/11/2017	Geneva	Phillips	
89	Patek Philippe	Pink Gold Ref. 1518	1947	Wrist	2.300	2.896	12/10/2019	New York	Phillips	
91	Patek Philippe	Pink Gold Repeater	1894	Pocket	2.29	3.277	11/13/2011	Geneva	Antiquorum	
92	Patek Philippe	Ref. 5217	2015	Wrist	2.284	2.51	26/04/2022	Hong Kong	Sotheby's	
93	Patek Philippe	Ref. 3448/100 "The Blue Royale"	1973 (cased in platinum in 1997)	Wrist	2.282	2.282	11/25/2021	Hong Kong	Phillips	
94	Patek Philippe	Rose Gold Ref. 2499	1957	Wrist	2.280	3.540	05/14/2007	Geneva	Christie's	
95	Patek Philippe	Ref. 1415 Heures Universelles "Eastern Hemisphere"	1949	Wrist	2.273	2.273	05/22/2021	Hong Kong	Christie's	
96	Rolex	Pink Gold Ref. 6062	1953	Wrist	2.271	2.50	23/04/2022	Monaco	Monaco Legend Auctions	
97	Patek Philippe	Gold World Time Ref. 2523	1953	Wrist	2.267	3.083	11/09/2014	Geneva	Christie's	
98	Patek Philippe	Stainless Steel Ref. 1591	1944	Wrist	2.264	3.515	11/12/2007	Geneva	Christie's	
99	Patek Philippe	Stephen Palmer No. 97912	1898	Pocket	2.252	3.113	06/11/2013	New York	Christie's	
100	Patek Philippe	Trossi Leggenda Chronograph	1932	Wrist	2.236	3.345	05/11/2008	Geneva	Sotheby's	
101	Patek Philippe	Platinum Ref. 1579	1946	Wrist	2.213	3.167	11/14/2011	Geneva	Christie's	
102	Tag Heuer	Steve McQueen Monaco Ref. 1133	1969	Wrist	2.208	2.747	12/12/2020	New York	Phillips	
103	Patek Philippe	Ref. 5531R-010 World Time Minute Repeater with the New York Skyline	2017	Wrist	2.198	2.198	12/09/2021	New York	Sotheby's	
104	Patek Philippe	Pink Gold Ref. 2499	1951 (encased in 1957) (Note: The movement was manufactured in 1951 and the watch was encased in 1957.)	Wrist	2.161	2.987	11/11/2013	Geneva	Christie's	
105	Patek Philippe	Yellow Gold Ref. 2499 with Italian Calendar	1957	Wrist	2.143	2.143	05/09/2021	Geneva	Phillips	
106	Patek Philippe	Rose Gold Ref. 2499	1951	Wrist	2.129	3.811	10/19/2002	Geneva	Antiquorum	
107	Audemars Piguet	Gérald Genta Royal Oak Ref. 5402	1978	Wrist	2.107	2.32	10/05/2022	Geneva	Sotheby's	
108	Patek Philippe	White Gold Ref. 2497	1953	Wrist	2.083	2.833	11/09/2014	Geneva	Christie's	
109	Zenith	Mahatma Gandhi No. 421357 (Note: The lot included the sandals, bowl, plate and a pair of glasses owned by Mahatma Gandhi along with his images and letters of authenticities issued by noted Indian historians.)	1910	Pocket	2.069	3.105	03/05/2009	New York	Antiquorum	
110	Rolex	Deep Sea Special No.1	1953	Wrist	2.066	2.066	11/08/2021	Geneva	Christie's	
111	Patek Philippe	Jean-Claude Biver Spider Lugs Stainless Steel Ref. 1579	1946	Wrist	2.047	2.547	06/28/2020	Geneva	Phillips	
112	Patek Philippe	World Map Ref. 605HU	1948	Pocket	2.045	2.25	24/05/2022	Hong Kong	Christie's	
113	Patek Philippe	Two-Crown Worldtime Ref. 2523/1	1965	Wrist	2.041	2.041	05/22/2021	Hong Kong	Christie's	
114	Rolex	Daytona Oyster Ref. 6263	1969	Wrist	2.036	2.731	05/14/2016	Geneva	Phillips	
115	Patek Philippe	Gübelin Ref. 2499	1951	Wrist	2.024	2.549	12/10/2019	New York	Phillips	
116	Rolex	Stainless Steel Ref. 6062	1953	Wrist	1.988	2.611	05/13/2017	Geneva	Phillips	
117	Patek Philippe	Yellow Gold Ref. 2499 with Italian Calendar	1953	Wrist	1.982	1.982	06/05/2021	Hong Kong	Phillips	
118	Patek Philippe	Henry Graves Grande Complication	1926	Pocket	1.981	3.266	11/14/2005	Geneva	Christie's	
119	Breguet	King George III Recordon, London, Gold Four Minute Tourbillon No. 1297	1808	Pocket	1.979	2.462	07/14/2020	London	Sotheby's	
120	Rolex	Marlon Brando Stainless Steel Ref. 1675	1972	Wrist	1.952	2.458	11/10/2019	New York	Phillips	
121	Patek Philippe	Titanium Cathedral Minute Repeating Annual Calendar Ref. 5033	2003	Wrist	1.951	2.427	07/13/2020	Hong Kong	Christie's	
122	Patek Philippe	Grogan Split-seconds Chronograph	1925	Wrist	1.945	3.106	11/13/2006	Geneva	Christie's	
122	Rolex	Stainless Steel Ref. 4113	1942	Wrist	1.945	2.449	11/09/2019	Geneva	Phillips	
122	Rolex	Pink Gold Ref. 6062	1952	Wrist	1.945	2.449	11/09/2019	Geneva	Phillips	
125	Rolex	Daytona The Arabian Knight Ref. 6263	1974	Wrist	1.931	2.476	05/12/2018	Geneva	Phillips	
126	Patek Philippe	Yellow Gold Officer	1923	Wrist	1.918	3.707	11/14/1999	Geneva	Antiquorum	
127	Patek Philippe	Stainless Steel Ref. 3939	2011	Wrist	1.911	2.735	09/23/2011	Monaco	Antiquorum	
128	Richard Mille	RM27-04 Tourbillon Rafael Nadal	2021	Wrist	1.891	2.25	11/05/2021	Geneva	Phillips	
129	Patek Philippe	Lee Kun-hee Platinum Ref. 1415 Heures Universelles	1946	Wrist	1.887	1.887	05/22/2021	Hong Kong	Christie's	
130	Richard Mille	Sapphire RM56-02	2015	Wrist	1.856	2.438	10/02/2017	Hong Kong	Sotheby's	
131	Omega	Elvis Presley Tiffany & Co. Ref. H6582/D96043	1960	Wrist	1.812	2.323	05/12/2018	Geneva	Phillips	
132	F. P. Journe	Astronomic Blue	2019	Wrist	1.811	2.281	11/09/2019	Geneva	Christie's	
133	Patek Philippe	Gradowski Clockwatch	1890	Pocket	1.810	1.810	05/22/2021	Hong Kong	Christie's	
134	Patek Philippe	Yellow Gold Ref. 2499	1952	Wrist	1.797	2.441	11/07/2015	Geneva	Phillips	
135	Patek Philippe	Henry Graves Platinum Ref. 811	1930	Pocket	1.779	3.032	05/18/2004	Geneva	Christie's	
136	Vacheron Constantin	James W. Packard Minute Repeater	1918	Pocket	1.763	2.523	06/15/2011	New York	Christie's	
137	Patek Philippe	White Gold Ref. 130	1944	Wrist	1.751	3.134	04/13/2002	Geneva	Antiquorum	
138	Patek Philippe	Gobbi Milan Ref. 2499	1960	Wrist	1.750	2.626	05/11/2009	Geneva	Christie's	
139	Rolex	Eric Clapton Crazy Doc Ref. 6239	1968	Wrist	1.743	1.92	07/05/2022	Geneva	Phillips	
140	Patek Philippe	Yellow Gold Ref. 2499	1956	Wrist	1.727	2.317	05/15/2016	Geneva	Phillips	
141	Patek Philippe	Gold World Time Ref. 2523	1953	Wrist	1.722	2.750	04/02/2006	Geneva	Antiquorum	
142	Patek Philippe	Platinum Calatrava Minute Repeater	1939	Wrist	1.711	3.512	04/20/1996	Geneva	Antiquorum	
143	Patek Philippe	Aviator Prototype Wristwatch	1936	Wrist	1.710	2.566	05/11/2009	Geneva	Christie's	
144	Patek Philippe	White Gold Ref. 3448	1981	Wrist	1.696	2.344	05/13/2013	Geneva	Christie's	
145	Chopard	Happy Diamond Wristwatch	2015	Wrist	1.6735	2.273	11/10/2015	Geneva	Christie's	
146	Patek Philippe	Stainless Steel Ref. 530	1939	Wrist	1.673	2.852	04/24/2004	Geneva	Antiquorum	
147	George Daniels	Edward Hornby Tourbillon Pocket Watch	1971	Pocket	1.663	2.132	12/12/2021	New York	Phillips	
148	Rolex	Daytona Oyster Ref. 6263	1969	Wrist	1.660	2.128	05/12/2018	Geneva	Phillips	
149	Cartier	Cartier London Crash	1967	Wrist	1.654	1.82	05/05/2022	Online	Loupe This	
150	Patek Philippe	Pink Gold World Time Ref. 1415	1939	Wrist	1.652	2.957	04/13/2002	Geneva	Antiquorum	
150	Bulova	David Scott Apollo 15 Chronograph No. 885104/01	1971	Wrist	1.652	2.244	10/22/2015	Boston	RR Auction	
152	Rolex	Jack of All Diamonds Daytona Ref. 6269	1985	Wrist	1.630	1.79	09/05/2022	Geneva	Christie's	
153	Patek Philippe	Yellow Gold Ref. 2499	1954	Wrist	1.625	1.625	11/07/2021	Geneva	Phillips	
154	Patek Philippe	Platinum Ref. 1579	1946	Wrist	1.623	2.276	11/12/2012	Geneva	Christie's	
155	Patek Philippe	Sky Moon Tourbillon Ref. 5002P-001	2004	Wrist	1.590	1.590	04/08/2021	Dubai	Christie's	
156	Patek Philippe	Trucchi Italian Calendar Ref. 2499	1971	Wrist	1.584	1.995	11/09/2019	Geneva	Phillips	
157	Patek Philippe	Platinum Automatic Perpetual Calendar Minute Repeater Ref. 3974	2001	Wrist	1.579	1.964	11/06/2020	Geneva	Phillips	
158	Attributed to Piguet & Capt	Pearl-set Musical, Perfume Flask, and Automaton Amphora-Form Watch	1805	Amphora-Form	1.577	1.577	05/22/2021	Hong Kong	Christie's	
159	Patek Philippe	Gold Ref. 3449	1961	Wrist	1.5726	2.236	11/14/2011	Geneva	Christie's	
160	Rolex	Gold Oyster Perpetual Ref. 6062	1952	Wrist	1.57250	2.016	12/06/2018	New York	Christie's	
161	Patek Philippe	Yellow Gold Ref. 2499/100	1979	Wrist	1.57247	2.016	05/13/2018	Geneva	Phillips	
162	Patek Philippe	Gold Ref. 1563	1947	Wrist	1.572	2.173	11/11/2013	Geneva	Christie's	
163	Patek Philippe	Yellow Gold Ref. 2499	1960	Wrist	1.566	2.057	08/13/2017	Geneva	Phillips	
164	Vacheron Constantin	Pink Gold Tour de I'lle	2005	Wrist	1.564	2.578	04/03/2005	Geneva	Antiquorum	
165	Patek Philippe	White Gold Ref. 3450	1985	Wrist	1.553	2.109	12/01/2015	Hong Kong	Phillips	
166	Patek Philippe	Yellow Gold Ref. 3448J	1975	Wrist	1.550	2.318	11/16/2008	Geneva	Sotheby's	
167	Patek Philippe	Platinum Ref. 69	1929	Wrist	1.549	2.711	05/13/2003	Geneva	Sotheby's	
168	Rolex	Paul Newman Daytona John Player Special Ref. 6264	1969	Wrist	1.545	1.922	07/31/2020	London	Sotheby's	
169	Patek Philippe	George Thompson Minute Repeater	1914	Pocket	1.541	2.461	05/16/2006	Geneva	Sotheby's	
170	Patek Philippe	Yellow Gold Ref. 2499	1951	Wrist	1.537	1.936	04/03/2019	Hong Kong	Sotheby's	
171	Patek Philippe	Yellow Gold Ref. 2499	1956	Wrist	1.514	2.265	10/17/2008	New York	Antiquorum	
172	Philippe Dufour	Simplicity 20th Anniversary 00/20	2020	Wrist	1.512	1.881	11/08/2020	Geneva	Phillips	
173	Patek Philippe	Serpico y Laino Pink Gold Ref. 1518	1951	Wrist	1.501	1.783	05/10/2021	Geneva	Christie's	

== Unranked results ==
The following table contains some of the most expensive auctioned watches without public online records from auctioneers (e.g., major auction houses). This list is possibly incomplete.

Rank	Manufacturer	Watch model	M.Y.	Style	Original price (USD millions)	Adjusted price (USD millions)	Auction date	Auction place	Remarks
-	Patek Philippe	Titanium Ref. 5524T	2018	Wrist	2.33	2.99	10/15/2018	Geneva	Children Action 2018 Auction (with Christie's)

== See also ==
- Grand complication
- List of watch manufacturers
- Patek Philippe Henry Graves Supercomplication
- Watchmaker
