= Patek Philippe Calibre 89 =

Commemorative pocket watch

- Manufacturer: Patek Philippe
- Type: pocket watch
- Display: Analogue
- Introduced: 1989
- Movement: Mechanical

The Patek Philippe Calibre 89 is a commemorative pocket watch created in 1989, to celebrate the company's 150th anniversary. Declared by Patek Philippe as "the most complicated watch in the world" at the time of creation, it has 33 complications, weighs 1.1 kg, exhibits 24 hands and has 1,728 components in total, including a thermometer, and a star chart. Before Calibre 89, Patek Philippe Henry Graves Supercomplication (created in 1933) had been the world’s most complicated timepiece ever assembled with a total of 24 different functions.

Patek Philippe Calibre 89 was made from 18 carat (75%) gold or platinum, with an estimated value of $6 million. It took five years of research and development, and four years to manufacture. Four watches were made: one in white gold, one in yellow gold, one in rose gold and one in platinum. The yellow-gold and the white-gold Calibre 89 were sold at auction by Antiquorum in 2009 and 2004, respectively, and both watches currently rank among the top 10 most expensive watches ever sold at auction, with final prices over 5 million US dollars. The one in yellow gold was later offered at Sotheby’s in 2017, but remained unsold due to disappointing biddings, less than $6.4 million, excluding buyer's premium.

Approximately 27 years later, on 17 September 2015, Vacheron Constantin introduced the Reference 57260 which took over the title of 'most complicated watch in the world' with a total of 57 complications.

== Complications (features) ==
- Grand sonnerie
- Petite sonnerie
- Trip minute repeater (westminster on 4 gongs)
- Alarm
- Day of the month
- 12-hour recorder
- Day of the week
- Hour of second time zone
- Moon phase display
- Winding crown position indicator
- Century decade and year displays
- Leap year indicator
- Power reserve
- Month
- Thermometer
- Date of Easter
- Time of sunrise
- Equation of time
- Star chart
- Sun hand
- Time of sunset
- Split second hand

== Specifications ==
- Total diameter 89 mm
- Total thickness 41 mm
- Total weight 1100 grams

== See also ==
- The Vacheron Constantin Reference 57260
- Patek Philippe Henry Graves Supercomplication
