= Tour de I'lle =

Swiss wristwatch manufacturer

The Tour de I'lle is a complicated wristwatch manufactured by the Swiss manufacturer Vacheron Constantin. It was released in 2005 in a limited edition of 7 pieces to commemorate the manufacturer's 250th anniversary.

The Tour de I'lle wristwatch took over 10,000 hours of research and development. The watch contains 16 complications and 834 individual parts, and is one of the most complicated wristwatches in the world.

== History ==
In 2005, Vacheron Constantin created the wristwatch "Tour de I'lle" to mark the anniversary of 250 years of Vacheron Constantin. It took 10,000 hours of research and development of the watch movement.

== Watch specifications ==
The watch has two dials and is made from pure 18K gold with a non-reflective glass of blue sapphire. It includes 834 parts and 16 horological complications, including tourbillon, minute repeater, moon phase, moon age and perpetual calendar, sky chart, sunrise, sunset and the equation of time.

== Price ==
The Tour de l'lle wristwatch is one of the most complicated wristwatches in the world. In total, only seven pieces were manufactured, each of which had a price of more than US$1 million. On April 3, 2005, a Tour de I'lle wristwatch was auctioned by Antiquorum, reaching a final price of 1.56 million US dollars (1,876,250 CHF). The auction piece has a unique black watch dial.
