= Vacheron Constantin =

Swiss watch company

Vacheron Constantin SA
- Type: Subsidiary
- Industry: Luxury watchmaking
- Founded: 1755; 271 years ago in Geneva, Switzerland; 1819 (as Vacheron & Constantin); 1970 (as Vacheron Constantin)
- Founder: Jean-Marc Vacheron
- Headquarters: Plan-les-Ouates, Canton of Geneva, Switzerland; 46.16597°N 6.10054°E
- Area served: Worldwide
- Key people: Laurent Perves (CEO)
- Products: Mechanical watches, clocks
- Production output: Around 20,000 (2018)
- Number of employees: Around 1,200 (2018)
- Parent: Richemont (since 1996)
- Website: vacheron-constantin.com

Vacheron Constantin SA (French pronunciation: [vaʃəʁɔ̃ kɔ̃stɑ̃tɛ̃]) is a Swiss luxury watch and clock manufacturer founded in 1755 that is known as one of the "Big Three" or "Holy Trinity" most prestigious heritage luxury watch brands alonside Audemars Piguet and Patek Philippe. Since 1996, it has been a subsidiary of the Swiss Richemont Group. Vacheron Constantin is the oldest continuously operating watch manufacturer in the world with an uninterrupted watchmaking history since its foundation in 1755. It employs around 1,200 people worldwide as of 2018, most of whom are based in the company's manufacturing plants in the Canton of Geneva and Vallée de Joux in Switzerland.

Vacheron Constantin is a highly regarded watchmaker and part of the Holy Trinity (alongside Patek Philippe and Audemars Piguet). The Vacheron Constantin pocket watch No. 402833 (1929), which was owned by King Fuad I of Egypt, ranks as one of the most expensive watches ever sold at auction, fetching US$2.77 million (3,306,250 CHF) in Geneva on April 3, 2005. In 2015, Vacheron Constantin introduced the pocket watch Reference 57260, which currently holds the title of the most complicated mechanical watch ever made, with 57 horological complications. In 2024, Vacheron Constantin unveiled Les Cabinotiers - The Berkley Grand Complication, a pocket watch featuring 63 complications, surpassing the previous record set by Reference 57260 with 57 complications. This model includes the very first Chinese perpetual calendar.

== History ==
=== Early history ===
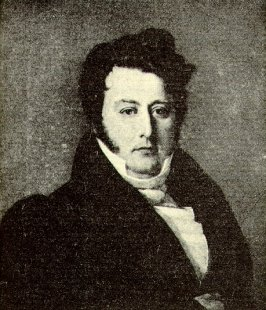
François Constantin

The business was founded in 1755 by Jean-Marc Vacheron, an independent watchmaker in Geneva, Switzerland. He was a close friend of leading Enlightenment philosophers Jean-Jacques Rousseau and Voltaire due to their common interests in philosophy, science and watchmaking. In 1770, Vacheron's company created the world's first horological complication, and nine years later he designed the first engine-turned dials. The son of Jean-Marc Vacheron, Abraham Vacheron took over the family business in 1785. In 1810, Jacques-Barthélemy Vacheron, the grandson of the founder, became the head of the company. He was the first to initiate the company's exports to France and Italy. Later, Jacques-Barthélemy realized that he was not able to handle the business alone. In order to travel overseas and sell the company's products, he needed a partner. Consequently, in 1819, François Constantin became an associate of Vacheron. The company continued its activities under the new name Vacheron & Constantin. The company's motto (which remains today), "Faire mieux si possible, ce qui est toujours possible (Do better if possible and that is always possible)", first appeared in Constantin's letter to Jacques-Barthélémy. The letter was dated 5 July 1819.

François Constantin traveled around the world and marketed watches. The main market at the time was North America. In 1833, Vacheron and Constantin hired Georges-Auguste Leschot, whose job was to supervise the manufacturing operations. In particular, Leschot was an inventor and his creations turned out to be a success for the company. His inventions had significant impact on the watchmaking industry in general, and he was the first person to standardize watch movements into Calibers. In 1844, Georges-Auguste Leschot was awarded with a gold medal from the Arts Society of Geneva, which highly appreciated Leschot's pantographic device - a device that was able to mechanically engrave small watch parts and dials.

=== Re-organization ===
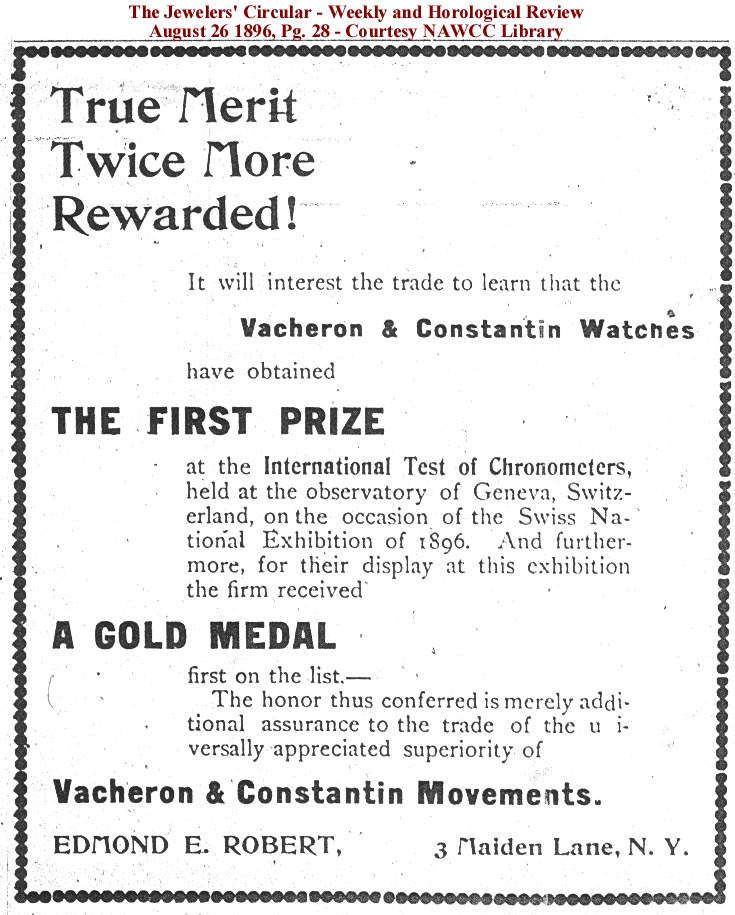
Advertisement from 1896 promoting their observatory trial results

After François Constantin's death in 1854 and Jacques-Barthélemy Vacheron's death in 1863, the company was taken over by a series of heirs. At one point, the company was headed by two women. In 1862, Vacheron Constantin became a member of the Association for Research into non-magnetic materials.

In 1877, Vacheron & Constantin, Fabricants, Geneve became the official name of the company. In 1880, the company started using the Maltese cross as its symbol until today. This was inspired by a component of the barrel, which had a cross-shape and was used for limiting the tension within the mainspring.

In 1887, Vacheron & Constantin was reorganized into a joint-stock company. Notably, in the same year, Fabergé's 1887 Third Imperial Egg contained a Vacheron Constantin Lady's watch as the surprise. For the remarkable achievements of the company, Vacheron & Constantin was awarded a gold medal at the Swiss National Exhibition in Geneva in 1887. The first Vacheron & Constantin boutique in Geneva was opened in 1906.

During the Great Depression, Vacheron & Constantin found itself in a difficult situation. In 1936, Charles Constantin became the head of the company, the first time since 1850s that a representative from the Constantin family became the president of Vacheron & Constantin. However, in 1940, Georges Ketterer acquired the majority portion of the stock of Vacheron & Constantin from Charles Constantin.

=== Recent development ===
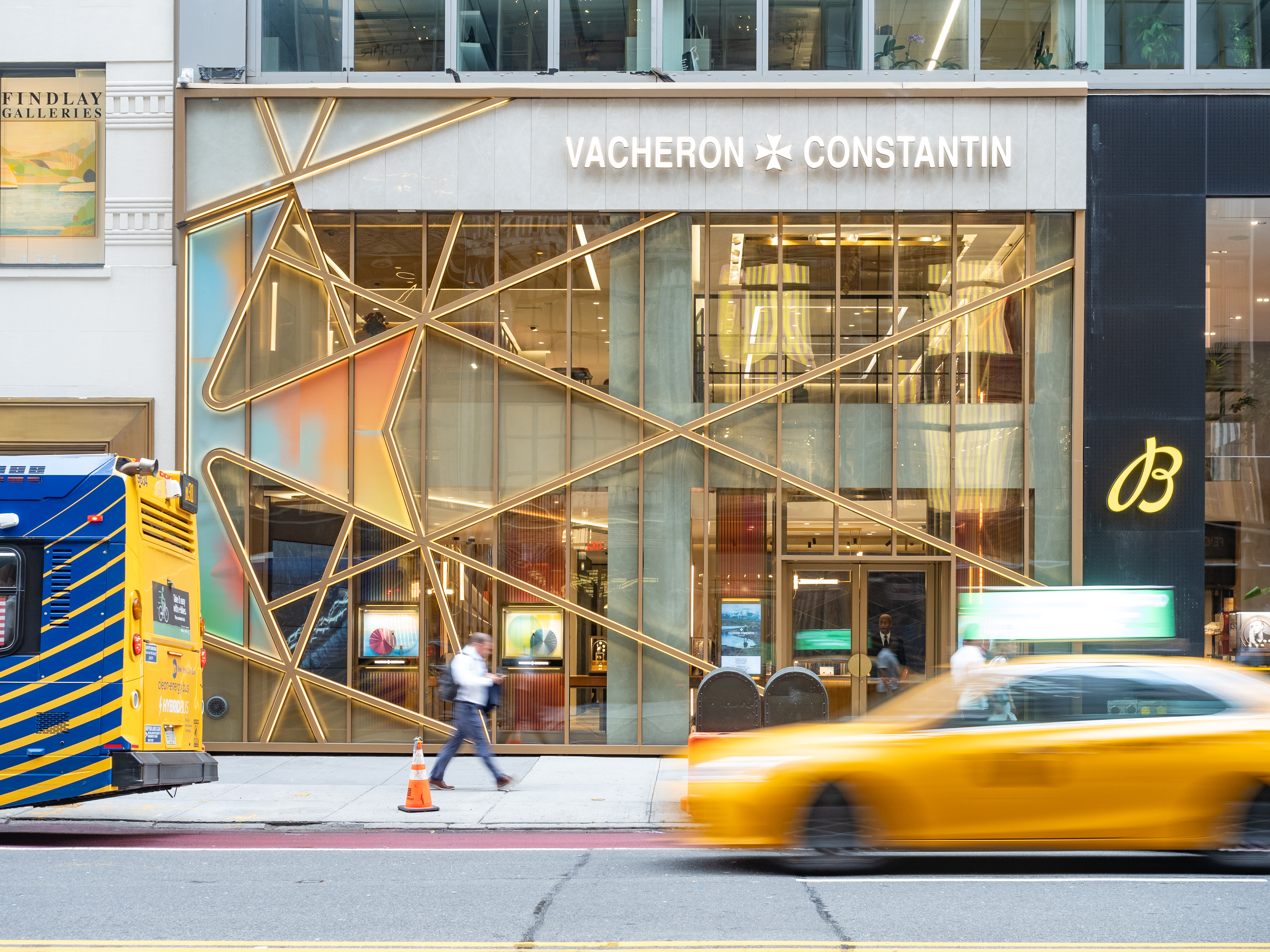
Vacheron Constantin shop in Manhattan

George Ketterer died in 1969, and his son, Jacques Ketterer, succeeded as the head of Vacheron & Constantin. In 1970, the company officially changed its name to Vacheron Constantin.

Vacheron Constantin was affected by the quartz crisis during 1970s and 1980s. When Jacques Ketterer died in 1987, Vacheron Constantin changed hands. Sheik Ahmed Zaki Yamani, the former Oil Minister of Saudi Arabia and avid watch collector, became the company's majority shareholder, who then folded Vacheron Constantin into his personal portfolio of holdings. In 1996, the entire share capital of Vacheron Constantin was bought by the Swiss Richemont Group.

In 2004, Vacheron Constantin opened its new headquarters and manufacture in Plan-les-Ouates, Geneva. The Vacheron Constantin headquarters building in Geneva was designed by Bernard Tschumi, and has been noted for its architectural significance. In October 2005, the Richemont Group named Juan Carlos Torres as the chief executive officer of the company.

The company is a member of the Federation of the Swiss Watch Industry FH, and produces about 20,000 timepieces per year.

== Motto and slogan ==
The company motto of Vacheron Constantin is "Faire mieux si possible, ce qui est toujours possible (Do better if possible, and that is always possible)". The motto first appeared in a François Constantin's letter to Jacques-Barthélémy, and the letter was dated July 5, 1819.

== Watch manufacturing ==
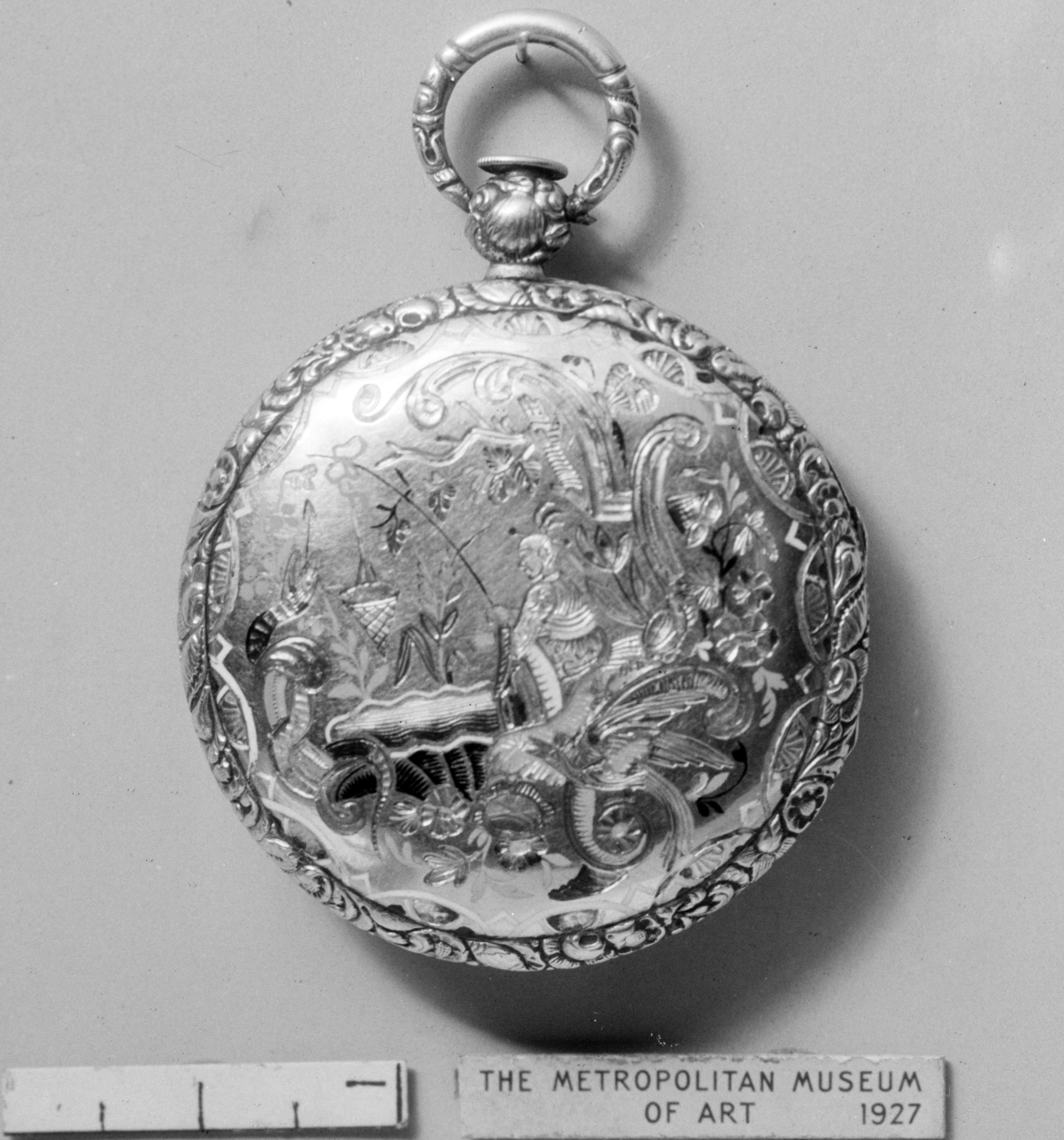
A Vacheron Constantin pocket watch in Metropolitan Museum of Art, New York

=== Notable inventions and patents ===
The following are some of the notable achievements of Vacheron Constantin in watch manufacturing.

- In 1790, created the world's first watch complication.
- In 1824, created a jumping-hour watch.
- In 1885, created the first nonmagnetic timepiece which included a complete lever assortment made of materials able to withstand magnetic fields. Its construction included a balance wheel, balance spring and lever shaft that were made of palladium, the lever arms—in bronze and the escape wheel was in gold.
- In 1901, received the first Geneva Seal (Hallmark of Geneva) for its timepieces.
- In 1929, created a "Grande Complication" pocket watch, No. 402833, for King Fuad I of Egypt.
- In 1955, produced the world's thinnest manual-winding movement, the Calibre 1003.
- In 1992, created the world's thinnest minute repeater, the Calibre 1755.
- In 2015, created Reference 57260, the most complicated mechanical watch/pocket watch ever made, with 57 complications.

== Notable models ==
=== Most expensive pieces ===
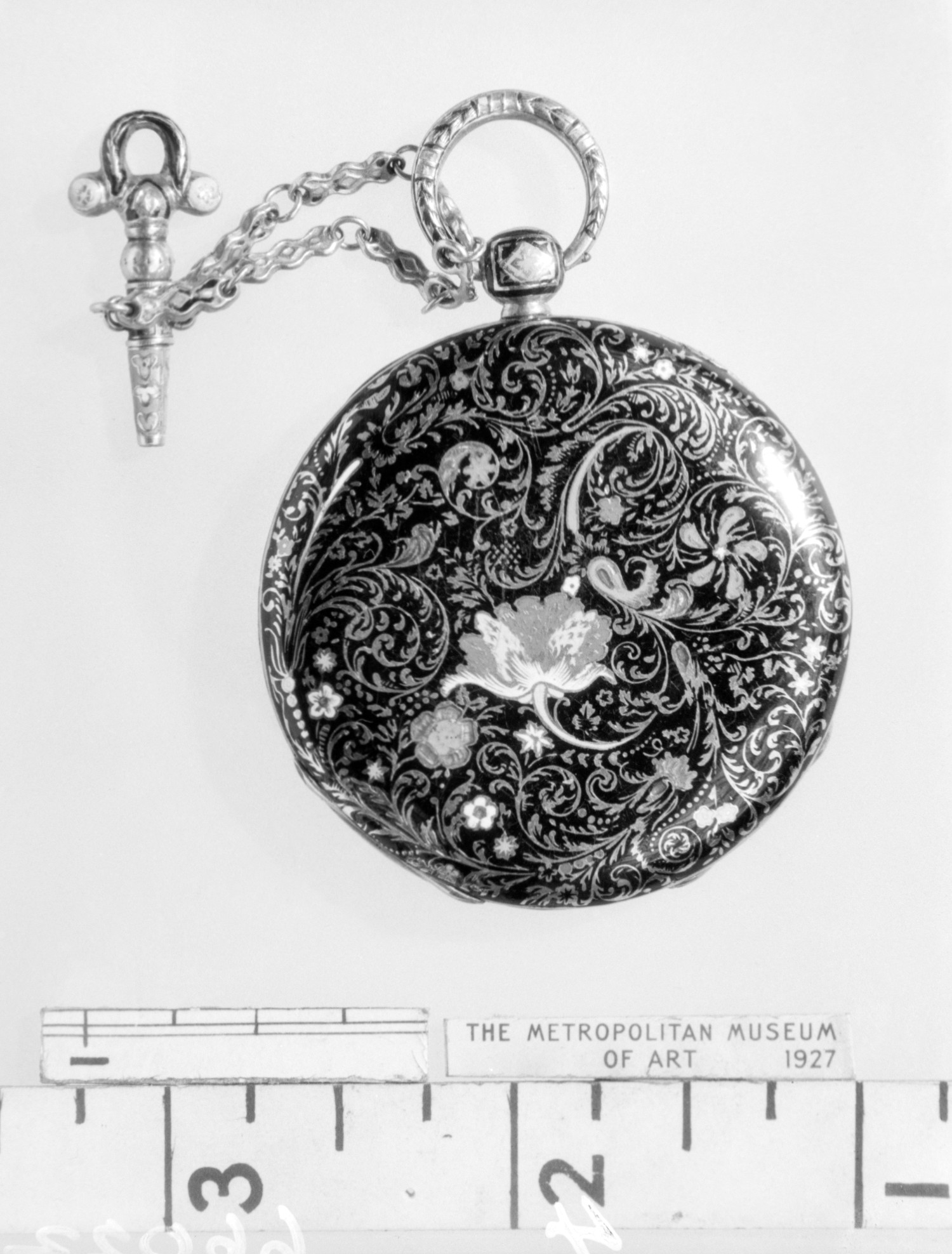
A Vacheron Constantin pocket watch in Metropolitan Museum of Art, New York

- In 1979, Vacheron Constantin made Kallista, one of the most expensive wristwatches in the world. Its initial price was $5 million, but in 2016 the watch was valued at about $11 million. Kallista had 118 emerald-cut diamonds. It took about 6,000 hours for the watch masters to make this watch and about 20 months for jewelers to enrich the watch.
- On 3 April 2005, the Vacheron Constantin pocket watch Ref. 402833 (1929), which was owned by King Fuad I of Egypt, fetched a final price of 2.77 million US dollars (3,306,250 CHF) in Antiquorum's Geneva auction.
- On April 3, 2005, a Vacheron Constantin mysterious clock was auctioned by Antiquorum for 1.83 million US dollars (2,206,250 CHF) in Geneva.
- On 3 April 2005, a Vacheron Constantin wristwatch Tour de I'lle fetched 1.56 million US dollars (1,876,250 CHF) in Antiquorum's Geneva auction.
- On 15 June 2011, a Vacheron Constantin minute repeater pocket watch (1918), which was owned by James Ward Packard, was auctioned for 1.76 million US dollars in Christie's New York auction.

=== Overseas wristwatch ===
In 1996, Vacheron Constantin formally introduced a new high-end sports line called Overseas. The precursor of Overseas collection, however, was originally introduced in 1977 during the quartz crisis. The precursor was the wristwatch Ref. 222, which was designed by a 23-year-old designer named Jorg Hysek.

The original version of Overseas was revamped in 2004, and was re-invented again in 2016. Some of the Overseas wristwatches also come with complications such as chronograph, World Time, tourbillon, moon phase, and so on.

=== 222 wristwatch ===
In January 2025, for the brand's 270th anniversary, Vacheron Cosntantin re-released their 222 model, with the inclusion of a piece in steel, with the Ref. 4200H/222A-B934. This marked another notable entry into the integrated steel sports watch market, paired with the established Overseas model.

=== Patrimony wristwatch ===
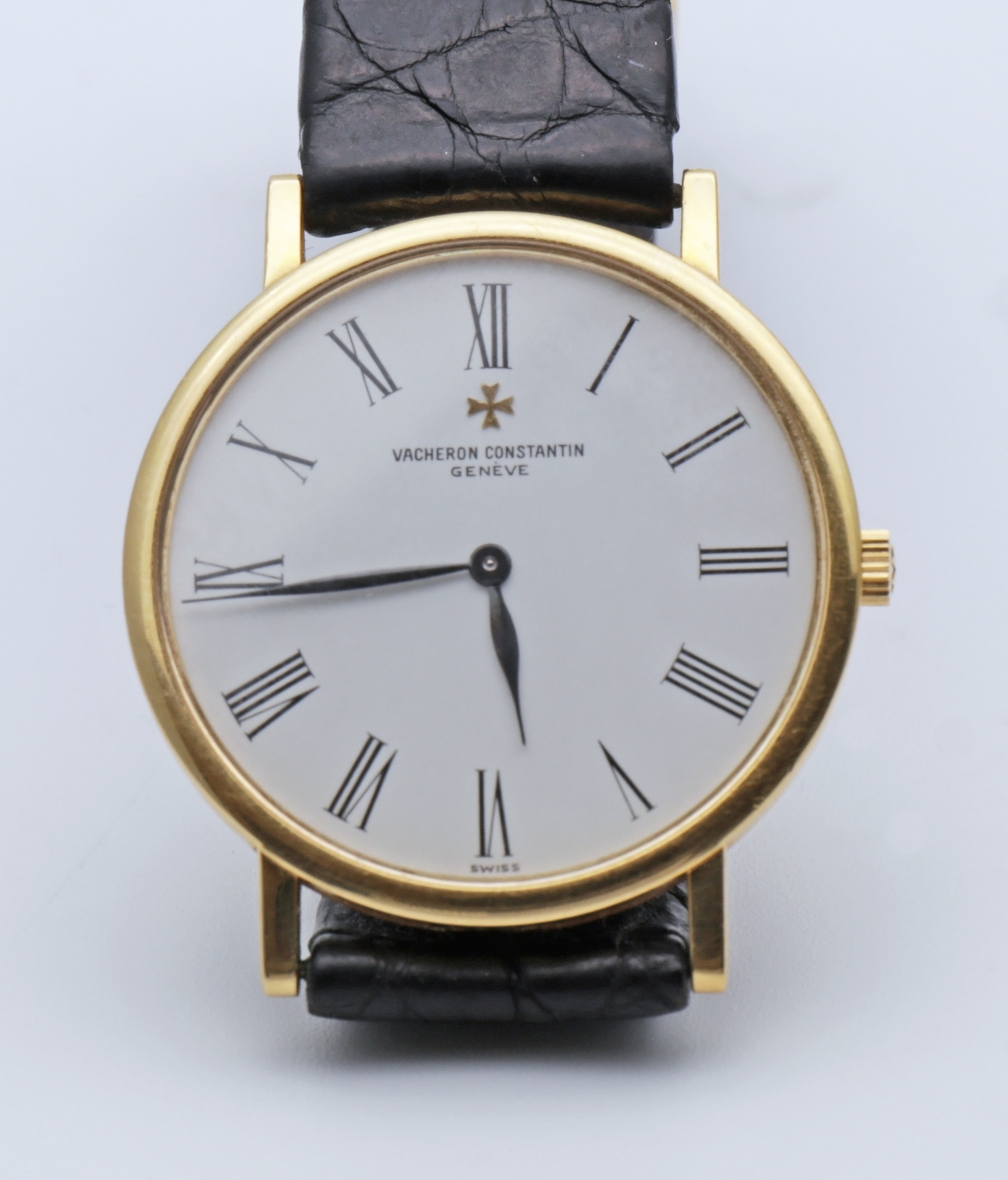
A Vacheron Constantin Patrimony wristwatch

The Patrimony wristwatch is a model of Vacheron Constantin. The collection was introduced in 2004, and is known for its simple and elegant design as well as its ultra-thin case. The designer was inspired by some of the company's watch models from the 1950s.

In 2009, Vacheron Constantin decided to integrate the minute repeating complication into some of the Patrimony wristwatches, and the end product was the Patrimony Calibre 1731, the world's thinnest minute repeater. The current Patrimony collection also includes some other complications such as perpetual calendars and moon phase indicators.

=== Métiers d'Art wristwatch ===
In 2007, Vacheron Constantin introduced the Métiers d'Art 'Les Masques' collection of timepieces featuring miniature reproductions of primitive art masks. The company selected 12 masks from a private museum collection and reproduced them on a small scale. The miniaturized masks are featured in the dial centre of every watch from the 'Les Masques' collection.

In 2012, Vacheron Constantin introduced the Métiers d'Art 'Les Univers Infinis' collection of timepieces featuring tessellation, a design of interlocking shapes inspired by the work of the Dutch artist M. C. Escher.

=== 250th anniversary edition ===
In 2005, Vacheron Constantin created the wristwatch "Tour de I'lle" to mark the anniversary of 250 years of Vacheron Constantin. The watch includes 834 parts and 16 horological complications, including tourbillon, minute repeater, moon phase as well as moon age, and took over 10,000 hours of research and development.

The Tour de l'lle wristwatch is one of the most complicated wristwatches in the world. In total, only seven pieces were manufactured, each of which had a sale price over US$1 million. On 3 April 2005, a Tour de I'lle wristwatch fetched a final price of 1.56 million US dollars (1,876,250 CHF) in Antiquorum's Geneva auction. The auctioned piece has a unique black dial.

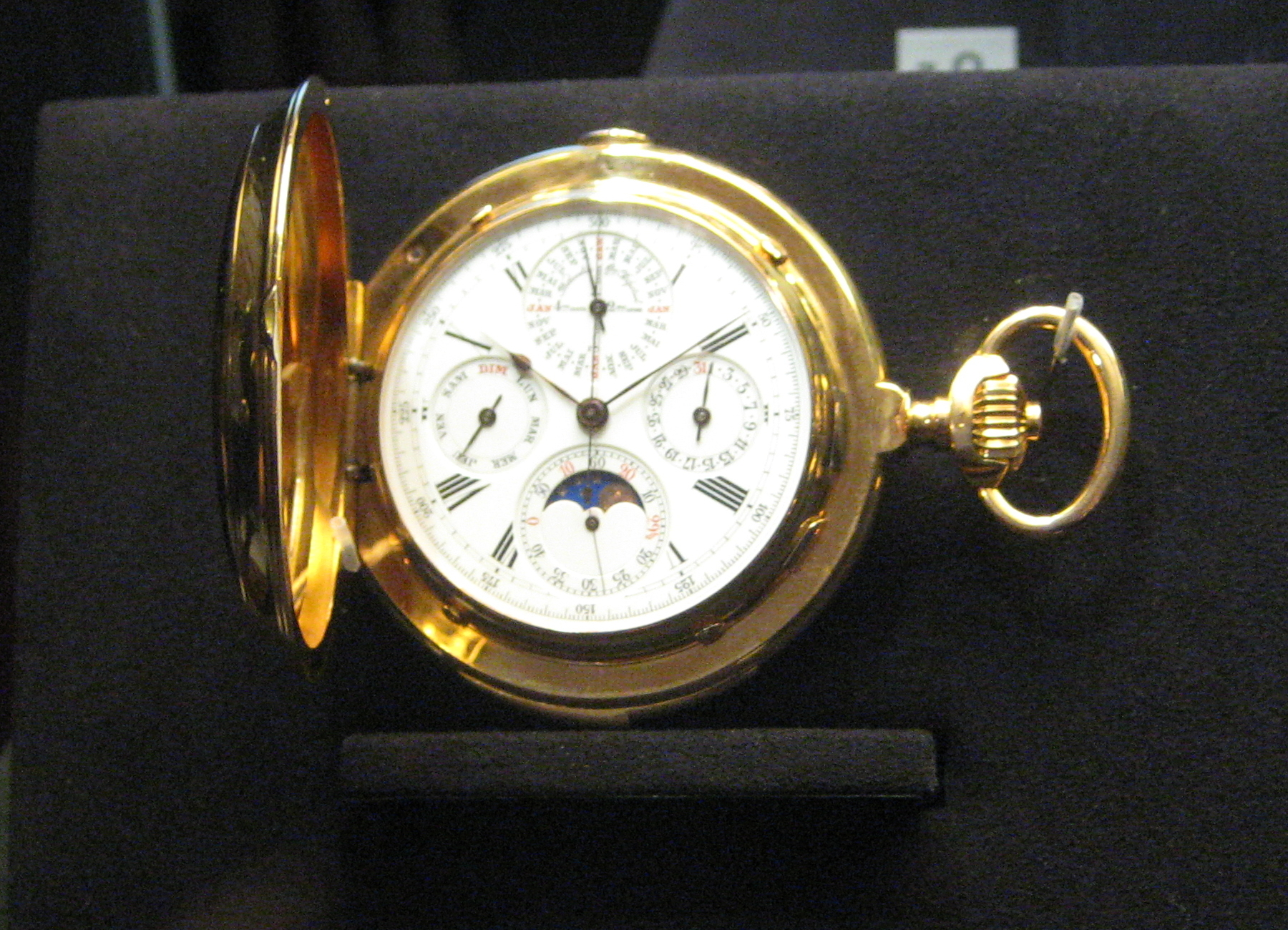
A Vacheron Constantin pocket watch (1901)

=== 260th anniversary edition ===
In 2015, during the manufacturer's 260th anniversary, Vacheron Constantin revealed the world's most complicated mechanical watch, named Reference 57260. The pocket watch took three watchmakers eight years to build the 57-complication pocket watch at the request of a client. Vacheron Constantin would not disclose the exact price of this watch but did confirm that it was between 8 million and 20 million US dollars.

The Reference 57260 is part of Vacheron Constantin's lineage of tailor-made grand complicated pocket watches since James W. Packard's pocket watch (1918), which was auctioned for US$1.763 million by Christie's in New York on 15 June 2011. In addition, the Vacheron Constantin pocket watch Ref. 402833 (1929), which was tailored for King Fuad I of Egypt, ranks as one of the most expensive watches ever sold at auction, fetching US$2.77 million (3,306,250 CHF) in Geneva on 3 April 2005. In 1946, Vacheron Constantin tailored a complicated pocket watch for King Farouk of Egypt, the successor of King Fuad I, and in 1948 the company tailored another one for Count Guy de Boisrouvray of France.

=== 270th anniversary edition ===
In 2025, Vacheron Constantin unveiled La Quête du Temps, a clock that houses more than 6,000 components, weighs 250 kilograms and is one metre tall. It took seven years and multiple craftsmen to create the clock that celebrates Vacheron Constantin's 270th anniversary.

That same year, Vacheron announced Métiers d’Art ‘Tribute to the Quest of Time’, a wristwatch limited to 20 pieces and a price of approximately $US1 million.

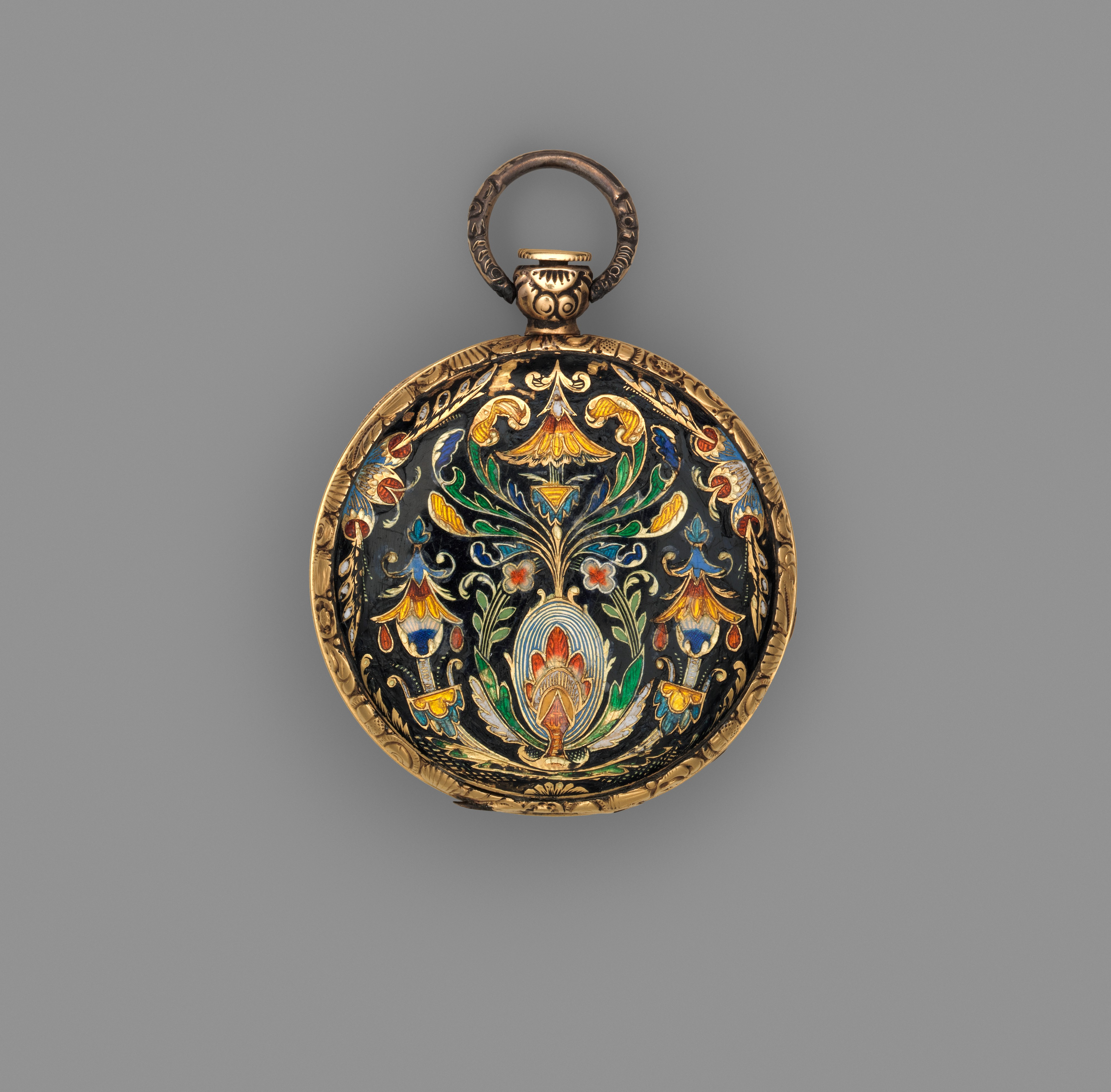
A Vacheron Constantin pocket watch in Metropolitan Museum of Art, New York

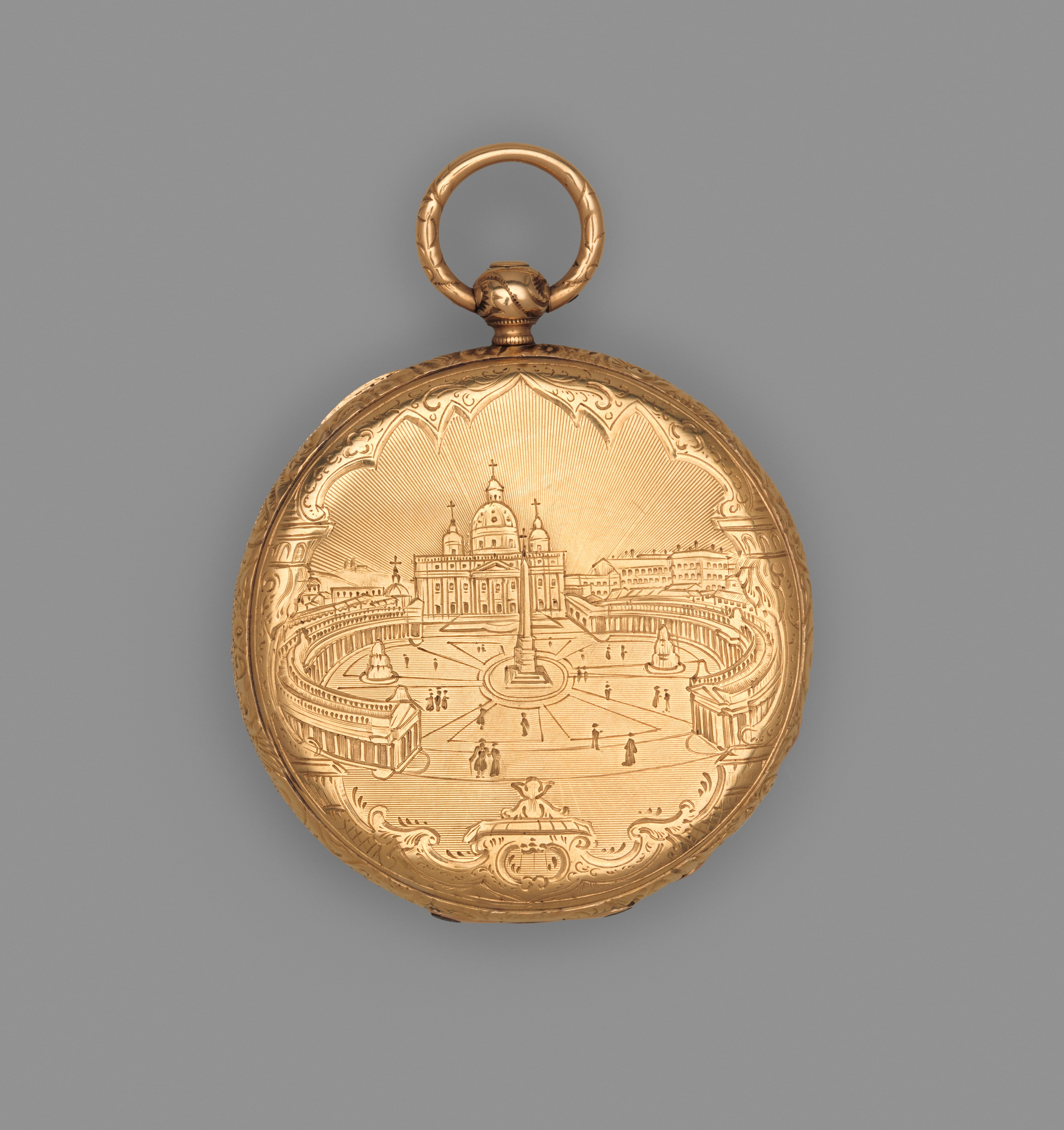
A Vacheron Constantin pocket watch in Metropolitan Museum of Art, New York

== See also ==
- List of watch manufacturers
- Manufacture d'horlogerie
- The Vacheron Constantin Reference 57260
- Tour de I'lle
