= Patek Philippe Henry Graves Supercomplication =

Former most complicated mechanical pocket watch

- Manufacturer: Patek Philippe
- Also called: The Supercomplication
- Type: Pocket watch
- Display: Analogue
- Introduced: 1933
- Movement: Mechanical

The Patek Philippe Henry Graves Supercomplication (no. 198.385) is one of the most complicated mechanical pocket watches ever created. The 18-karat gold watch has 24 complications and was assembled by Patek Philippe. It was named after banker Henry Graves, Jr., who supposedly commissioned it out of his desire to outdo the Grande Complication pocketwatch of American automaker James Ward Packard. The two were both at the top of the watch collecting world, regularly commissioning innovative new timepieces.

== History ==
Patek Philippe produced its first grand complication pocket watch in 1898 (no. 97.912); it had previously been believed the firm's first grand complication had been produced in 1910, and the second was delivered to Packard in 1916. The rivalry between Packard and Graves, who both commissioned timepieces from Patek Philippe, included two singular grand complication watches for Packard, one delivered in 1916 with sixteen complications (foudroyante, no. 174.129), and another in 1927 with ten complications (the "Packard Sky Chart", no. 198.023) and two for Graves, the "Grand Complication" (1926, no. 198.052) and "Supercomplication" (1932, no. 198.385). However, the rivalry story is apocryphal, and it is not clear that Packard and Graves ever met; the rivalry may have been fabricated in the early 1990s as a publicity stunt by Alan Banbery, a former director of Patek Philippe, for the unveiling of the Calibre 89. Other complicated watches that Graves sought to excel included the Leroy 01 (1904, twenty complications) and the Breguet No. 160 "Marie Antoinette" (1827).

It took three years to design, and another five years to manufacture the watch, which was delivered to Henry Graves on January 19, 1933. The Supercomplication was the world's most complicated mechanical timepiece for more than 50 years, with a total of 24 different functions. These included Westminster chimes, a perpetual calendar, sunrise and sunset times, and a celestial map of New York as seen from the Graves's apartment at 834 Fifth Avenue. The record was bested in 1989 when Patek Philippe released the Patek Philippe Calibre 89, but the Supercomplication remains the most complicated mechanical watch built without the assistance of computers.

Henry Graves spent 60,000 Swiss francs (US$15,000) when he commissioned it in 1925. Adjusting for inflation, the sum is roughly equivalent to $219,000 in 2019. When he took delivery, he did not want to be known as the owner of "the world's most complicated watch", fearing the threat to his family based on the notoriety of the Lindbergh kidnapping. When it was most recently sold in 2014, the Supercomplication established a new record for the most expensive watch ever sold at auction, with a final price of 24 million US dollars (23,237,000 CHF) sold in Geneva on 11 November 2014; that has since been exceeded by the sale of the Patek Philippe Grandmaster Chime at the Only Watch charity auction at Christie's in Geneva in 2019.

=== Subsequent ownership ===
Henry Graves Jr. died in 1953. His daughter Gwendolen inherited the Supercomplication and in 1960 passed it to her son, Reginald 'Pete' Fullerton. In 1969, Fullerton sold the piece to Seth G. Atwood, founder of the "Time Museum" and an American industrialist, for US$200,000 (equivalent to $1,800,000 in 2025).

After that, the watch was displayed in the Time Museum in Rockford, Illinois, US, a horological museum, until it closed in March 1999. From January 2001 to February 2004, some of the Time Museum collection was displayed at Chicago's Museum of Science and Industry, then sold. However, the Supercomplication was auctioned in December 1999.

=== 2 December 1999 auction ===
The watch was sold at Sotheby's for a record-breaking $11,002,500 to an anonymous bidder in New York City on 2 December 1999. From 2001 to 2005, the Supercomplication was exhibited at the Patek Philippe Museum in Geneva.

The new owner was later revealed to be a member of the Qatari royal family, Sheikh Saud bin Muhammed Al Thani. Prince Sheikh Saud died on 9 November 2014, and the watch was sent again for auction.

=== 11 November 2014 auction ===
On 10 July 2014, Sotheby's announced that in November 2014, the pocket watch would once again be auctioned. On 11 November 2014, the watch was sold in Geneva, Switzerland. The final price, bid by Aurel Bacs serving as proxy for an anonymous entity, reached 23,237,000 Swiss francs, equivalent to US$24 million at the time. The sum established a new highest price for a timepiece, including both pocket watches and wristwatches.

== Construction and complications ==
The timepiece contains 920 individual parts, with 430 screws, 110 wheels, 120 removable parts, and 70 jewels, all of them handcrafted on a tiny scale. The timepiece is a gold, double-dialled and double-openfaced, minute repeating clockwatch with Westminster chimes, grande and petite sonnerie, split seconds chronograph, registers for 60-minutes and 12-hours, perpetual calendar accurate to the year 2100, moon-phases, equation of time, dual power reserve for striking and going trains, mean and sidereal time, central alarm, indications for times of sunrise/sunset and a celestial chart for the nighttime sky of New York City at 40 degrees 41.0 minutes North latitude.

Its diameter is 74 millimetres (2.9 in); thickness of case with glass 36 millimetres (1.4 in); and weight 536 grams (18.9 oz). The case alone weighs 250 grams (8.8 oz) and was manufactured by Luc Rochat of L'Abbaye. Other credited watchmakers include:

Maker	Location	Function
Victorin Piguet and Jean Piguet	Le Brassus	Project managers
Luc Rochat	L'Abbaye and Geneva	Case
Juste Aubert	Bioux-Dessus	Winding
Michel Piguet	Le Brassus	Grande Sonnerie and Westminster
Charles Rochat	Chez Grosjean	Movement and chronograph arbors
Louis Rochat-Benoit	Les Bioux	Split-second chronograph
Paul-Auguste Golay	Le Sentier	Perpetual calendar, equation and sunrise/sunset
Henri-Daniel Piguet	Le Sentier	Time setting
David Nicole and Paul Piguet	Le Sentier	Finishing
Stern Frères	Geneva	Dials

The Supercomplication features the following 24 functions.

=== Timekeeping ===
- Hours, minutes and seconds of sidereal time (3 functions)
- Time of sunset and sunrise (2 functions)
- Equation of time

=== Calendar ===
- Perpetual calendar
- Days of the month
- Days of the week
- Months
- Stars chart
- Age and phases of the moon

=== Chronograph (stopwatch) ===
- Chronograph
- Split seconds
- 30-minute recorder
- 12-hour recorder

=== Chime ===
- "Grande sonnerie" (Westminster chimes) with carillon
- "Petite sonnerie" with carillon
- Minute-repeater
- Alarm

=== Other functions ===
- Going train up-down indication
- Striking train up/down indication
- Twin barrel differential winding
- Three-way setting system

== See also ==
Other supercomplicated pocket watches include:

- The Vacheron Constantin Reference 57260 (57 complications)
- Patek Philippe Calibre 89 (33 complications)
