= The Holy Trinity (horology) =

Collective marketing term for 3 luxury watch brands

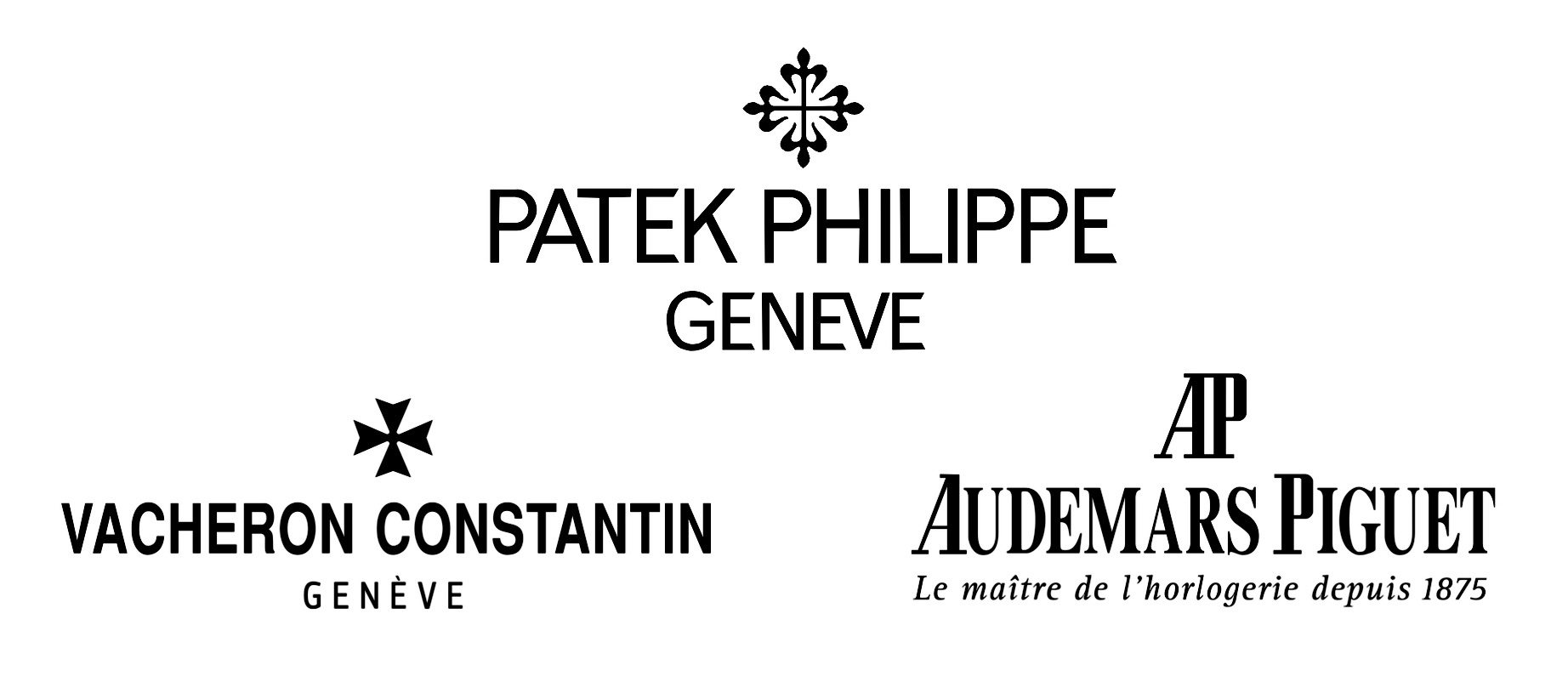
The Holy Trinity of Watches

The Holy Trinity (also The Big Three) is an informal collector-driven term in high-end horology collectively referring to three heritage luxury watch brands: Audemars Piguet, Patek Philippe, and Vacheron Constantin. The term dates back to the 1970s, while the brands were founded in 1875, 1839, and 1755, respectively.

The application of the term "Holy Trinity" -a concept with religious origins in Christianity- to these three companies is based on meticulous craftsmanship of their hand-crafted products, as well as the prestige tied to their long histories in the Swiss watch industry.
