= Alan Banbery =

English watch curator

Alan Banbery is an English watch curator. He worked at Patek Philippe from 1965, holding senior sales and curatorial responsibilities and contributing to the company's exhibitions, collection and contributions to horological scholarship. He collaborated with the Patek Philippe owner Philippe Stern, ultimately curating exhibits for the Patek Philippe Museum in Geneva, which opened in 2001. The collection has been described by watch historian and author Nicholas Foulkes as “a collection that is of priceless cultural importance, not just for the brand but for everyone interested in man’s centuries-old struggle to tame time with mechanical ingenuity”.

Retiring from his directorship at Patek in 1999, Banbery remained the museum’s curator until 2001.

== Education and early career ==
Educated at Westminster City School, Banbery left London aged 17 to attend the Geneva School of Watchmaking, simultaneously learning French.

After graduating, Banbery worked at Universal Genève for one year before, in 1952, returning to the UK to fulfil National Service. He served in the Royal Horse Artillery, Airborne Brigade and took part in operations in the Suez Crisis. He subsequently worked at Garrard & Co, the crown jeweller to Queen Elizabeth II, in London.

== Patek Philippe ==
It was during this stint at Garrard & Co. that Banbery’s sales expertise, technical knowledge and fluency in French caught the attention of Henri Stern, then Patek Philippe president. Banberry joined Patek Philippe as director of sales for English-speaking territories in 1965. Starting in the mid 1960s, with the curation of Henri Stern’s personal collection of vintage watches, Banbery built up the collection now on display at The Patek Philippe Museum. Through the 1970s, 1980s and 1990s, the collection grew, thanks to the addition of further Patek Philippe pieces as well as those from other significant watchmakers. Working closely with Philippe Stern, who became Patek's managing director in 1977 and president in 1993, Banbery became a regular presence in the world’s auction rooms during those decades.

The Patek Philippe Reference 3448J "Senza Luna" watch (Italian for "without moon") was emblematic of Banbery's contributions in the Patek Philippe canon. Banbery purchased his 3448, which features a moon phase indicator, in 1970. This piece was customised to display a leap year indication instead. The modification, undertaken by Patek Philippe's master watchmaker Max Berney five years later, involved removing the moon phase disk and installing a leap year display. The case back is engraved with Banbery's initials AB. Banbery retained the watch until 1999, when he sold it in a private transaction. It later appeared at auction and, in 2021, was offered by Christie’s in Hong Kong with an estimate of HK$24.8 million to HK$40 million (approximately US$3.1 million to US$5 million). It sold for HKD 29,050,000. It joined the list of most expensive watches sold at auction.

== Bibliography ==
- Patek Philippe, Genève Volume 1
- Patek Philippe, Genève Volume 2
