= Jean-Marc Vacheron =

Genevan watchmaker (1731–1805)

- Born: April 29, 1731; Geneva, Republic of Geneva
- Died: 1805 (aged 73–74)
- Occupation: Horologist

Jean-Marc Vacheron (1731–1805) was a Genevan horologist and a founder of the Vacheron Constantin watch company. He was a close friend of leading Enlightenment philosophers Jean-Jacques Rousseau and Voltaire due to their common interests in philosophy, science and watchmaking.

== Early life ==
Jean-Marc Vacheron was born in 1731 in Geneva, Republic of Geneva. His father was Jean-Jacques Vacheron.

== Career ==
Vacheron opened his watch shop in 1755.

His timepieces naturally bore the name "Jean-Marc Vacheron". At that time he was 24 years old and was one of many cabinotiers-watchmakers who specialized in the production of certain components, selling them to so-called etablisseurs.

(The watchmakers were called cabinotiers in honor of the well-lit cabinets on the top floors of the houses in Geneva's Saint-Gervais neighborhood, where they worked.)

== Personal life ==
Vacheron had five children. His sons Louis Andre (born in 1755) and Abraham (born in 1760) followed in his footsteps.

== Death ==
He died in 1805.
