= Samuel Watson (horologist) =

Samuel Watson (fl. c.1635-c.1710), was a horologist (clock and watch maker) who invented the 5 minute repeater, and made the first stopwatch. He made a clock for King Charles II and was an associate of Isaac Newton.

== Inventions ==
In 1695 Samuel Watson made the Physicians Pulse watch which was the first watch with a lever that stopped the second hand. In 1710 Samuel Watson invented the 5 minute repeater.

== Royal connection ==
One of his astronomical clocks can be seen in the library of Windsor Castle. The original case for that clock may be at the Herbert Art Gallery and Museum.

In 1686 he was sheriff of Coventry, before moving to Long Acre, London in 1690/91.
