= Henry Graves (banker) =

American banker (1868–1953)

Henry Graves Jr.
- Born: March 11, 1868; Orange, New Jersey, US
- Died: March 21, 1953 (aged 85); New York City
- Occupations: Banker, watch collector
- Employer(s): Maxwell & Graves
- Known for: Owning the most complicated watch
- Spouse: Florence Isabel Preston
- Children: 4

Henry Graves Jr. (1868–1953) was an American banker descended from John Graves of Concord, Massachusetts.

== Early life and career ==
He was born on March 11, 1868, in Orange, New Jersey, into a prominent banking family, the son of Henry Graves Sr. (1838–1906), a founder and partner in the Maxwell & Graves banking firm. Graves Jr. made millions of dollars in banking and railroads. He was also an art collector whose single-owner sale was held in 1936 by American Art Association - Anderson Galleries, Inc., which evolved into Sotheby's. The highlight of that sale was Albrecht Dürer's Adam and Eve, which sold for an impressive $10,000.

== Watch collector ==
An ardent watch collector, Graves was a patron of Patek Philippe, competing with James Ward Packard, the automobile manufacturer, for ownership of the most complicated watches in the world. In 1927 Packard commissioned a complicated watch but, not to be outdone, Graves surpassed his rival in 1933 to become the owner of the most complicated watch ever made.

=== Supercomplication watch ===
It was called Patek Philippe Henry Graves Supercomplication. Designed and built by Patek Philippe, it was an ultra-complicated (24 functions) pocket watch. Graves spent 60,000 Swiss francs (USD $15,000) (equivalent to $373,072 in 2025), nearly five times the price paid by Packard. It took three years to design, another five to manufacture, and was sold to Graves on January 19, 1933. The most advanced techniques in horological engineering produced a truly one-of-a-kind timepiece; only one watch was ever built. Complications included a perpetual calendar with phases and age of the moon, indication of sunrise and sunset, and a celestial chart depicting the stars in the nighttime sky over New York City.

Graves died in 1953. His heirs sold the watch in 1968 to The Time Museum in Rockford, Illinois, which closed in March 1999. (From January 2001 through February 2004 the Time Museum collection was displayed at Chicago's Museum of Science and Industry, then sold.) The watch was held in the Rockford Time Museum until it was sold at Sotheby's for a record-breaking $11,002,500 to an anonymous bidder in New York City on December 2, 1999. The owner was later known to be a member of the Qatari Royal Family, Sheikh Saud bin Muhammed Al Thani. The watch was on loan to the Patek Philippe Museum in Geneva, Switzerland for several years, and was the most expensive single piece on display.

On July 10, 2014, Sotheby's announced that in November 2014, the watch would once again be auctioned. It sold for 23.2 million Swiss francs (US$24 million or €19.3 million) at Sotheby's in Geneva on November 11, 2014, setting a new record price for any timepiece sold at auction.

== Personal life ==
In 1896, Henry Graves married Florence Isabel Preston of Irvington-on-Hudson, New York, and they had four children. They owned several vacation homes in addition to their residence in New York City. The family spent their summers at their homes in Irvington and Saranac, New York. In Saranac, the Graves owned Eagle Island, where Graves reveled in boating. The island is a National Historic Landmark and has been operated for many years as a children's summer camp.

== Death ==
Graves died aged 85 on March 21, 1953, in New York City.
