= Complication (horology) =

Any feature of a timepiece beyond the display of hours, minutes and seconds

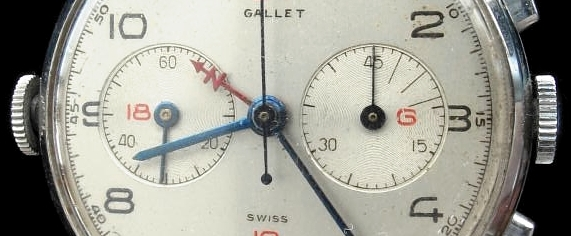
Three complications on a Gallet MultiChron Navigator (1943): a crown-controlled synchronizable second hand, a direction-finding 24-hour hand, and a 45-minute recording chronograph

In horology, a complication is any feature of a timepiece beyond the display of hours, minutes and seconds. A timepiece indicating only hours, minutes and seconds is known as a simple movement. Common complications include date or day-of-the-week indicators, alarms, chronographs (stopwatches), and automatic winding mechanisms. Complications may be found in any clock, but they are most notable in mechanical watches where the small size makes them difficult to design and assemble. A typical date-display chronograph may have up to 250 parts, while a particularly complex watch may have a thousand or more parts. Watches with several complications are referred to as grandes complications.

== Types ==
=== Timing ===
- Chronograph, with a second hand that can be stopped and started to function as a stopwatch.
  - Double chronograph or rattrapante, multiple second hands for split-second, lap timing or timing multiple events
  - Flyback chronograph, allowing rapid reset of the chronograph as it is running
  - Independent second-hand chronograph
  - Jumping second-hand chronograph
- Calendar date
- Day of the week
- 24-hour watch (with an hour hand sweeping through 24 divisions rather than twelve)
- Display of time zones (usually, a second hour hand displays the Coordinated Universal Time)
- world time
- Quickset date
- small seconds (seconds are displayed in a subdial)
- Foudroyante (also called "flying seconds", a dedicated hand that completes a full rotation in one second indicating fractions of a second)

Many of these complications can result in watch defects, often due to watch owners manipulating mechanisms without an instruction manual, or disregarding "no-set-periods", time periods when no setting should be attempted, such as a certain phase before midnight when a watch with a date complication is already in the process of internally shifting discs.

=== Mechanical ===
- Self-winding, using the motion of the wrist and arm to recapture energy
- Power reserve indicator or réserve de marche
- Tourbillon, a mechanical refinement to an escapement that mitigates the effects of gravity on the operation of a timepiece
- Retrograde indication (hands sweep through an arc of a circle instead of the full circle, usually 90°, they spring back to 0° when they reach the 90° point and start sweeping again)
- Dead second (the second hand moves once per second instead of once per oscillation as in common mechanical movements)

=== Astronomical ===
- Annual calendar
- Perpetual calendar
- Equation of time and variations within the year
- Time of sunset and sunrise
- Date of Easter
- Sign of the Zodiac
- Moon phases
- Mechanized star chart
- Astrolabe dial
- Planetarium dial
- Display of zone solar time (as opposed to standard time)
- Display of true local solar time
- Display of sidereal time

=== Striking ===
- Alarm
- Passing strike (chiming watch)
- Repeater

=== Non-horological ===
By some definitions, a display on a watch may be a complication even if it is unrelated to time-telling. Some horologists discount non-horological features (even those tangential to timekeeping such as winding limitations mechanisms or power reserves) as being true complications. Examples include:

- Thermometers
- Barometers
- Compasses
- Altimeters

== Grand(e) complications ==
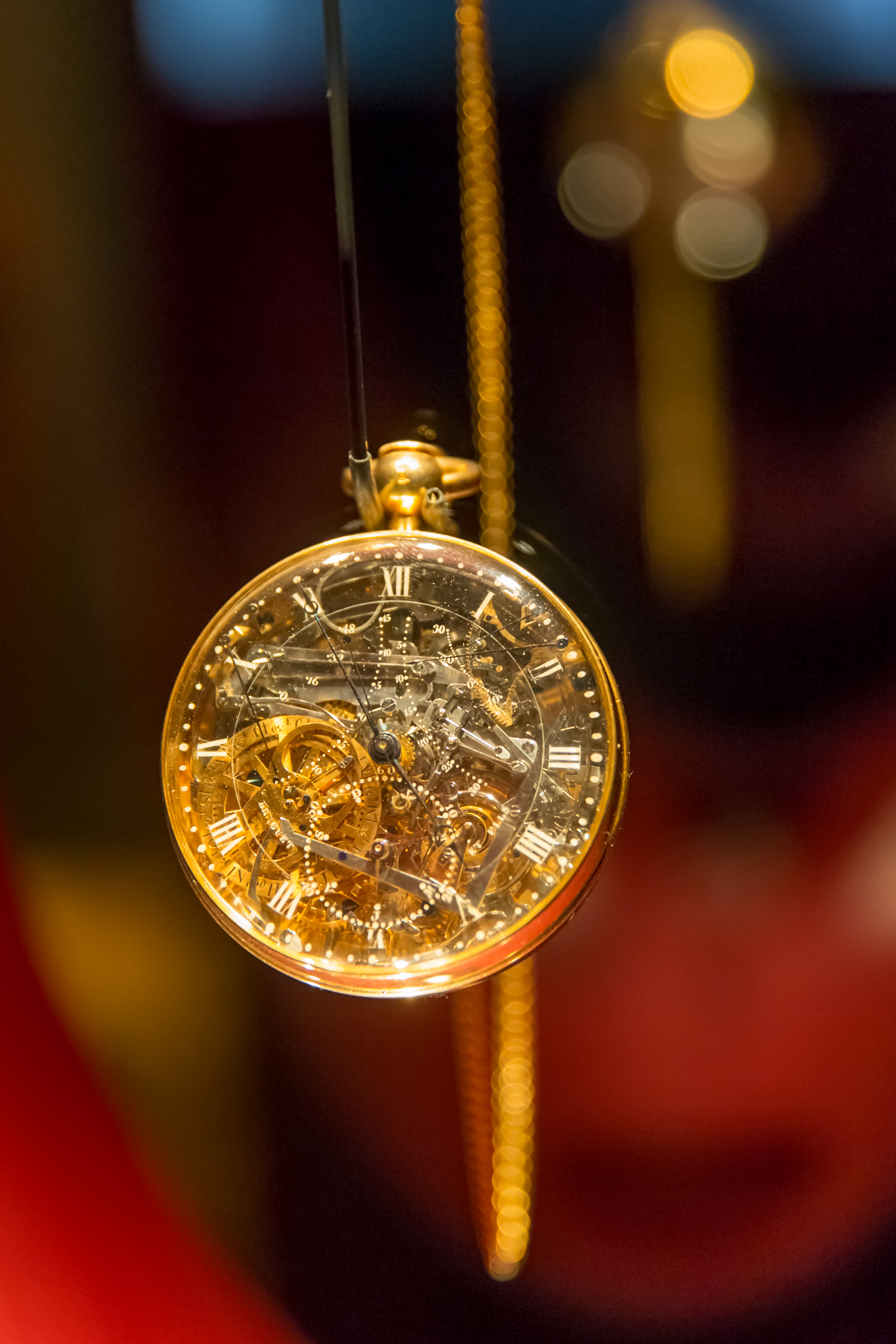
Тhe Breguet No. 160 grand complication

A grand(e) complication is a watch with several complications, the most complex achievements of haute horlogerie, or fine watchmaking. Although there is no official definition, one common criterion is that a watch contain at least one (visible) timing complication, one astronomical complication, and one striking complication.

Ultra-complicated watches are produced in strictly limited numbers, with some built as unique instruments. Some watchmaking companies known for making ultra-complicated watches are Breguet, Patek Philippe, and Vacheron Constantin. The initial ultra-complicated watches appeared due to watchmakers' ambitious attempts to unite a great number of functions in a case of a single timepiece. The mechanical clocks with a wide range of functions, including astronomical indications, suggested ideas to the developers of the first pocket watches. As a result, as early as in the 16th century, the horology world witnessed the appearance of numerous complicated and even ultra-complicated watches.

As of November 2018, the top four most complicated mechanical watches ever created are manufactured by Vacheron Constantin and Patek Philippe, respectively. In particular, the Patek Philippe Henry Graves Supercomplication currently holds the title of the second most expensive watch ever sold at auction, with a final price of 23,237,000 CHF (US$25,363,721) sold in Geneva on 11 November 2014. Two Patek Philippe Calibre 89 also currently rank among the top 10 most expensive watches ever sold at auction, with final prices over 5 million US dollars.

1. The Vacheron Constantin Les Cabinotiers Solaria Ultra Grand Complication – La Première, unveiled in 2025, is now widely regarded as the most complicated wristwatch in the world, featuring 41 complications and 1,521 components. Developed over eight years by a single watchmaker, it includes astronomical functions, a perpetual calendar, tide indicators, a minute repeater, and more. Powered by the Calibre 3655 with 13 patents, it was launched for the brand’s 270th anniversary at Watches and Wonders 2025.
2. The Patek Philippe Calibre 89 has 33 complications, using a total of 1,728 parts. It was released in 1989 to commemorate the 150th anniversary of the company. The complications include the date of Easter, sidereal time, and a 2,800-star celestial chart.
3. The Supercomplication delivered to Henry Graves, Jr. in 1933 has 24 complications. The watch was reportedly the culmination of a watch arms race between Graves and James Ward Packard. The Super-complication took three years to design and five to build, and sports a chart of the nighttime sky at Graves' home in New York. It remains the most complicated watch (920 parts) built without the assistance of computers.
4. The Star Caliber 2000 has 21 complications. They include sunrise and sunset times and the lunar orbit, and it is capable of playing the melody of Westminster quarters (from Big Ben, the clock tower of the Houses of Parliament in London).

Blancpain is famous for being the creator of one of the most complicated mechanical watches ever made, the Blancpain 1735, which is a true grand complication (Tourbillon, minute repeater, perpetual calendar, split chrono), a limited edition of 30 pieces only, production of just one piece per year.

The Hybris Mechanica Grande Sonnerie is the world's second most complicated wristwatch. Powered by the Jaeger LeCoultre Calibre 182 movement, with 27 complications and over 1,300 parts. The movement is housed in a 44 by 15 mm (1 3/4 by 9/16 in) 18 karat white gold case.

== Use in smartwatches ==
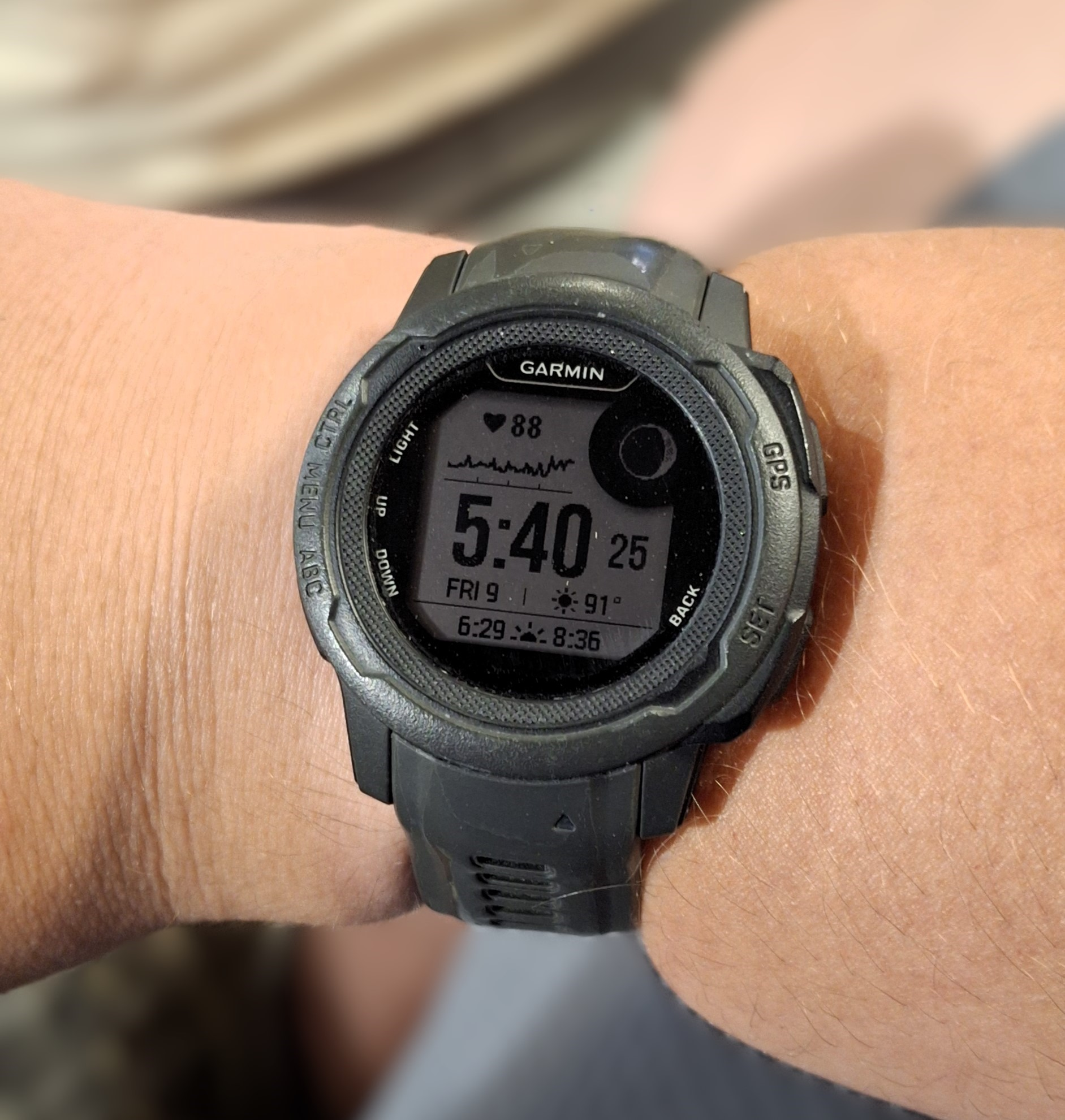
Smartwatch with the following complications: Heart rate with sparkline; Moon phase; date; weather; sunrise/sunset.

In smartwatches, complications are features other than time display, implemented in software.

== See also ==
- List of most expensive watches sold at auction
- Watchmaker
