= Antiquorum =

Auctioneer of timepieces

Antiquorum Genève SA
- Type: Private company
- Industry: Auctions
- Founded: 1974; 52 years ago
- Headquarters: Geneva, Switzerland
- Products: Auctioning of fine watches
- Website: www.antiquorum.swiss

Antiquorum is an auctioneer of modern and vintage timepieces. Established in Geneva in 1974, Antiquorum was the first auction house to auction fine watches over the Internet in the 1990s.

The company was founded in Geneva in 1974 and expanded to have branches in ten cities, including New York, London, Moscow, Paris, Milan, Munich, Shanghai, and Tokyo.

Antiquorum conducts auctions in Geneva, New York and Hong Kong about ten times a year, preceded by previews in various major cities worldwide.

In 1989 Antiquorum held a "landmark auction" called "Art of Patek Philippe." This auction helped to establish Patek Philippe's reputation as a luxury watch brand and viable investment and solidified the notion that watches could be more than just "timepieces."

== Notable auctions ==
- In 2002, Antiquorum set the all-time world record for a wristwatch at auction, selling a unique 1939 platinum Patek Philippe World Time Ref. 1415 for US$4,026,524 (SFr. 6,603,500) - more than double the previous world record.
- On October 16, 2008, Antiquorum sold a gold Longines wristwatch once owned by Albert Einstein for US$596,000 in New York.
- In March 2009, Antiquorum auctioned a number of Mahatma Gandhi's possessions including his Zenith pocket watch and spectacles. This caused controversy and the Indian government tried to cancel the sale.
- In November 2009 and March 2004, Antiquorum sold the yellow-gold and the white-gold Patek Philippe Calibre 89, respectively, and both watches currently rank among the top 10 most expensive watches ever sold at auction, with final prices over 5 million US dollars (the auction record for Antiquorum).
