= Repeater (horology) =

Complication in a mechanical watch or clock

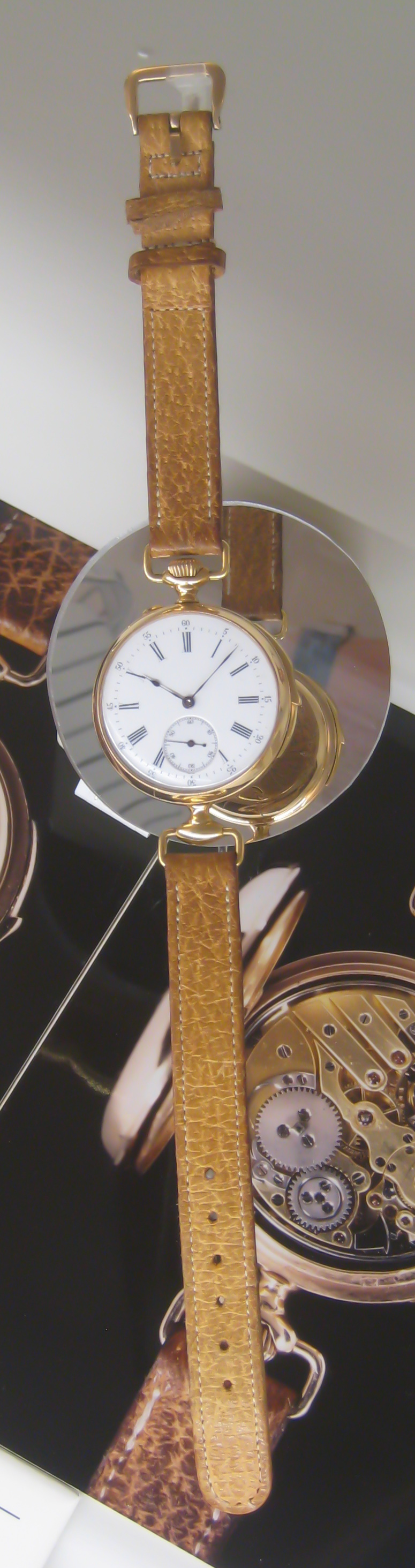
The 13 in (33 cm) watch by Louis Brandt (1892) was the first wristwatch with a minute repeater. The movement was manufactured by Audemars Piguet.

A repeater is a complication in a mechanical watch or clock that chimes the hours and often minutes at the press of a button. There are many types of repeater, from the simple repeater which merely strikes the number of hours, to the minute repeater which chimes the time down to the minute, using separate tones for hours, quarter hours, and minutes. They originated before widespread artificial illumination, to allow the time to be determined in the dark, and were also used by the visually impaired. Now they are mostly valued as expensive novelties by watch and clock enthusiasts. Repeaters should not be confused with striking clocks or watches, which do not strike on demand, but merely at regular intervals.

== History ==
The repeating clock was invented by the English cleric and inventor, the Reverend Edward Barlow in 1676. His innovation was the rack and snail striking mechanism, which could be made to repeat easily and became the standard mechanism used in both clock and watch repeaters ever since. The best kind of repeating clocks were expensive to make; a separate train of wheels had to be added to the striking mechanism, and to activate it one pulled a cord whereupon it would strike the hours and quarters, or even the hours and five-minute divisions (five minutes repeating). During the nineteenth century such clocks gradually went out of use. Due to cheap imports from France, Germany and America English clockmaking went into decline and with the advent of gas lighting repeating clocks became an unnecessary luxury.

Both Edward Barlow and Daniel Quare claimed the invention of the repeating watch, just before 1700. Both applied for a patent on it, which was decided in favor of Quare in 1687. Repeater watches were much harder to make than repeater clocks; fitting the bells, wire gongs and complicated striking works into a pocketwatch movement was a feat of fine watchmaking. So repeating watches were expensive luxuries and status symbols; as such they survived the introduction of artificial illumination and a few are still made today.

Whereas repeating watches made in the eighteenth century struck a bell mounted in the back of the case, during the nineteenth century wire gongs were invariably employed as they took up less space. These appear to have been invented by the Swiss around 1800. Another type of repeating watch made during the period 1750–1820 was the dumb repeating watch. These had two hammers for hours and quarters, striking blocks within the case which made a dull sounding thud which could be felt in the hand.

Generally, repeating watches strike the hours and quarters, although the best London made eighteenth century repeating mechanisms (motions) were made using the Stockten system, named after the original inventor Matthew Stockten (known also as Stockton, Stockdon or Stogden) who worked for the famous makers Daniel Quare and George Graham.

These were made to strike the hours, quarters and half quarters (7 1/2 minutes). From around 1750 watches this system was modified to repeat the hours, quarters and minutes (the minute repeater), the famous London maker John Ellicott appears to have been the first to produce these in numbers. During the nineteenth century following the improvements made by A.L. Breguet, the minute repeating mechanism became much more common but still to be found only in the best watches as it was expensive to make.

== Operation ==
The rack and snail striking mechanism used in repeaters is described in detail in the striking clock article. Repeater clocks often had a cord with a button on the end protruding from the side of the clock. Pulling the cord actuated the repeater mechanism. This was called a pull repeater. Repeating carriage clocks have a button on the top to activate them.

Early watch repeater mechanisms were actuated by pushing and depressing the pendant (the top) of the watch. Later ones are activated by pushing a slide along the side of the case. This winds a separate spring to power the repeater. Releasing the slide releases the spring, and its force as it unwinds moves the repeater mechanism through its chiming sequence.

A problem with very early repeaters was that the slide could be released before it was fully cocked, causing the repeater to only chime part of its sequence. Around 1820 French watchmaker Abraham Breguet invented a reliable 'all-or-nothing' mechanism that prevented this, making watch repeaters considerably more reliable and popular. The first repeaters had a single bell mounted in the back of the case, on which 2 hammers would strike. This bell was made of "bell metal", a mixture of copper and tin. Later repeating watches use gongs made of long hardened steel wires that are coiled inside the watch case. Tiny hammers actuated by the repeater mechanism strike them to make the chiming sounds. Some of the complex repeaters, such as the minute repeater, need to produce three different sounds, to distinguish hours, quarter hours, and minutes in the striking sequence. Since it is difficult to fit three bulky wire gongs into a watch movement, virtually all repeaters use two gongs, made from the two ends of a single length of wire supported in the middle, and if a third sound is needed it is made by striking the two gongs rapidly in sequence, first the high tone and then the low: "ding-dong".

The repeaters have a mechanism that allows the pace of the repeater strikes to be changed. The owner of a repeater watch can ask a watchmaker to change the pace, making it faster or slower. According to the book "Etablissage et Repassage des Montres à Répétition" by John Huguenin (page 39 of the original edition), "a minute repeater with an average speed takes about twenty seconds to strike 12 hours, three quarters and fourteen minutes".

== Types ==
=== Quarter repeater ===
The quarter repeater strikes the number of hours, and then the number of quarter hours since the last hour. The mechanism uses 2 chimes of different tones. The low tone usually signals the hours, and the high tone the quarter hours. As an example, if the time is 2:45, the quarter repeater sounds 2 low tones and after a short pause 3 high ones: "dong, dong, ding, ding, ding". Alternatively, some use a pair of tones to distinguish the quarter hours: "dong, dong, ding-dong, ding-dong, ding-dong"

=== Half-quarter repeater ===
The half-quarter repeater can sound the time to half a quarter hour, or 7 1/2 minutes. It strikes hours and then quarter hours, like the quarter repeater, then it uses a single tone in order to signal if more than half of the current quarter hour has passed. For example, if the time is 3:41 the mechanism will strike 3 low tones ("dong") to represent 3 hours, then 2 sequence tones ("ding-dong") to represent 2 quarter hours, then one high tone ("ding") to indicate that more than half of the third quarter hour has passed.

=== Five-minute repeater ===
First made in 1710 by Samuel Watson, the five-minute repeater strikes the hours and then the number of five-minute periods since the hour. The mechanism uses a low tone for the hours and a high tone for the minutes. For example, 2:25 would be struck as: "dong, dong, ding, ding, ding, ding, ding".

=== Minute repeater ===
The minute repeater works like the quarter repeater, with the addition that, after the hours and quarter hours are sounded, the number of minutes since the last quarter hour are sounded. This requires three different sounds to distinguish hours, quarters, and minutes. Often the hours are signaled by a low tone, the quarters are signaled by a sequence of two tones ("ding-dong"), and the minutes by a high tone. For example, if the time is 2:49 then the minute repeater will sound 2 low tones representing 2 hours, 3 sequence tones representing 45 minutes, and 4 high tones representing 4 minutes: "dong, dong, ding-dong, ding-dong, ding-dong, ding, ding, ding, ding".

=== Decimal repeater ===
The decimal repeater works like the minute repeater, but instead of chiming the quarter hours followed by minutes, it sounds the number of ten-minute intervals after the last hour and then the minutes. For example, if the time is 2:49 then the decimal repeater will sound 2 low tones representing 2 hours, 4 sequence tones representing 40 minutes, and 9 high tones representing 9 minutes: "dong, dong, ding-dong, ding-dong, ding-dong, ding-dong, ding, ding, ding, ding, ding, ding, ding, ding, ding". These repeaters, although first made more than 250 years ago, are very rare.

=== Grande and petite sonnerie ===
Grande sonnerie (French, meaning 'grand strike') is a quarter (or minute) striking mechanism combined with a repeater. On each quarter hour, it chimes the current hours and quarters past the hour. Depending on the design of the sonnerie either the hours, or quarters can be sounded first. The chiming is usually done on two or more chimes (with two or more hammers), the quarter chimes can be a simple combination of high and low notes, or elaborate melodies, such as Westminster Chimes.

A grande sonnerie acts as a repeating watch that triggers itself on the quarters (acting the same way a minute or quarter repeater would act if it was triggered manually by the user at the same time) and has its own power source (often a second barrel). This also means that grand sonneries will often chime the hours first, the quarters, like most repeaters, and will have a way to activate the repeater on demand. It is more complex than the petite sonnerie, which is not built around a repeater mechanism, and will strike the hours on the hour and the quarter hours on the quarter, with no repeater function. In some examples it can strike the hours at the push of a button.

Modern sonnerie watches merge both types of sonnerie, making grande and petite sonnerie selectable modes that the user can choose between, as well as having an optional minute or quarter repeater. These watches will either have a distinctive double barrel setup, one wound by turning the clock clockwise, the other counter clockwise, or will use a single barrel for both timekeeping, and chiming. The number of strikes that a sonnerie can produce on a full wind depends on the striking mechanism and spring.

The sonnerie is implemented differently in clocks. On every quarter-hour it strikes the number of quarter hours audibly on a gong, and then the number of hours since the last hour on a second gong. For instance, in a 3 weight Vienna regulator wall clock, at 6:15 it would strike once on a high pitched gong, then strike six times on a lower pitched gong. At 6:30 it would strike twice on the high pitched gong, then six times on the lower pitched gong. At 6:45 three times on the high pitched gong, then six times on the lower pitched gong, and at 7:00 it would strike four times on the high pitched gong, then seven times on the lower pitched gong. The exact time every fifteen minutes will always be known by listening to the striking. These types of striking clocks are mostly found as French Carriage Clocks, or German three weight Vienna regulators. In addition they can strike the quarters and hours on demand, by activating a repeating mechanism at the push of a button, or the pull of a string. The term is sometimes used erroneously for a mere quarter striking mechanism.

=== Dumb repeater ===
Used by the visually impaired and to tell the time quietly in meetings and concerts, 'dumb' repeater watches did not chime audibly, but instead produced vibrations. Instead of a gong, the hammer struck the hours on a solid metal block attached to the case, producing a dull 'thud' that could be felt in the hand.

=== Ten Minute Repeater ===
A student of the Ecole Technique de la Vallée de Joux created a mechanical ten minute repeater in the 1930s.

== Pictures ==
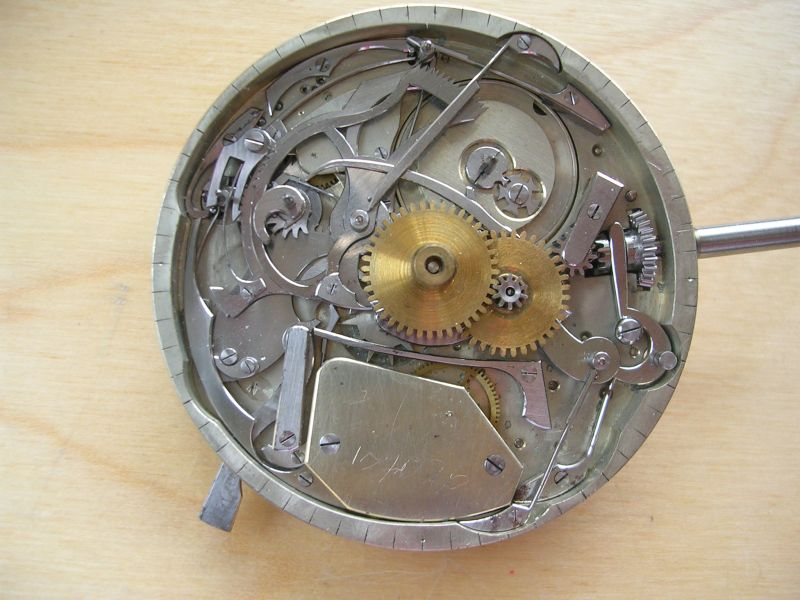
Minute Repeater Ébauche, dial side.

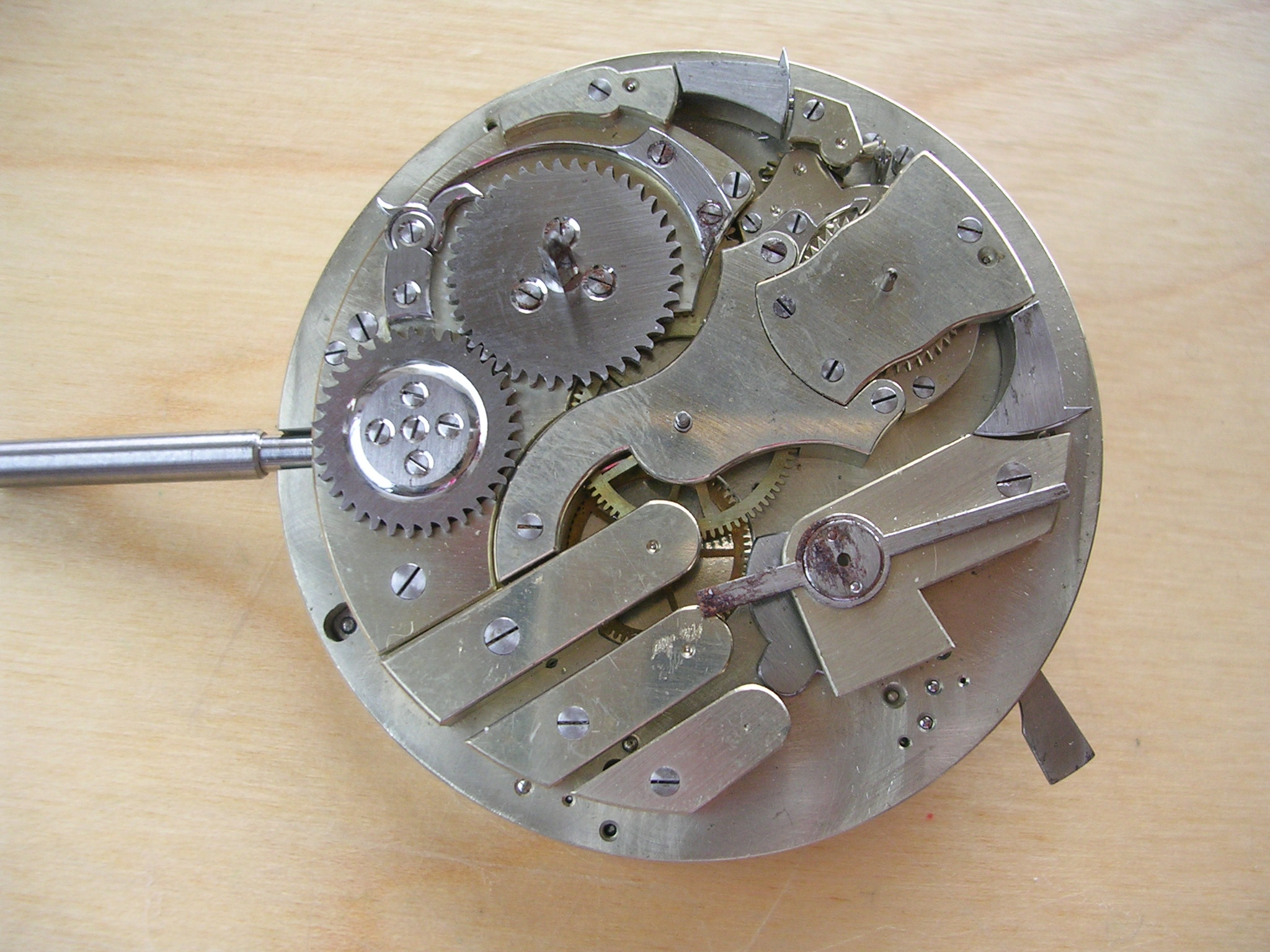
Minute Repeater Ebauche, back side

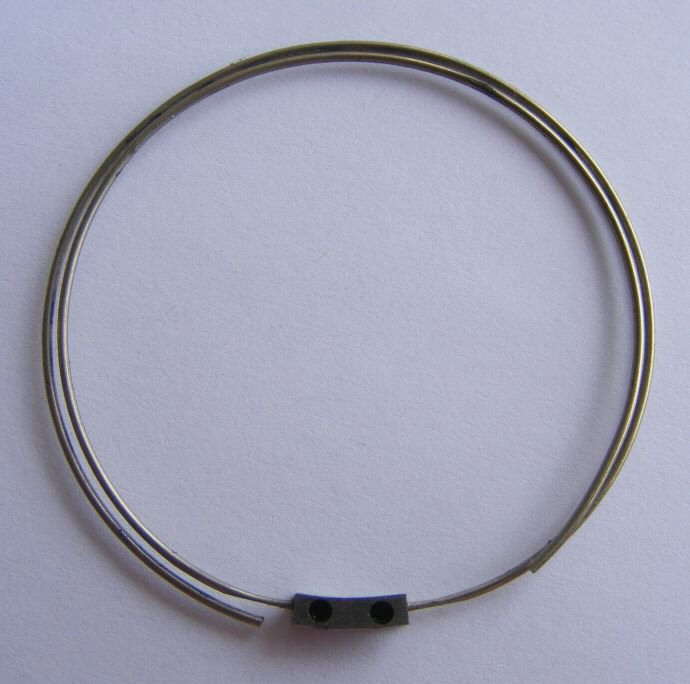
Minute repeater gong, about 2 inches (5 cm) diameter

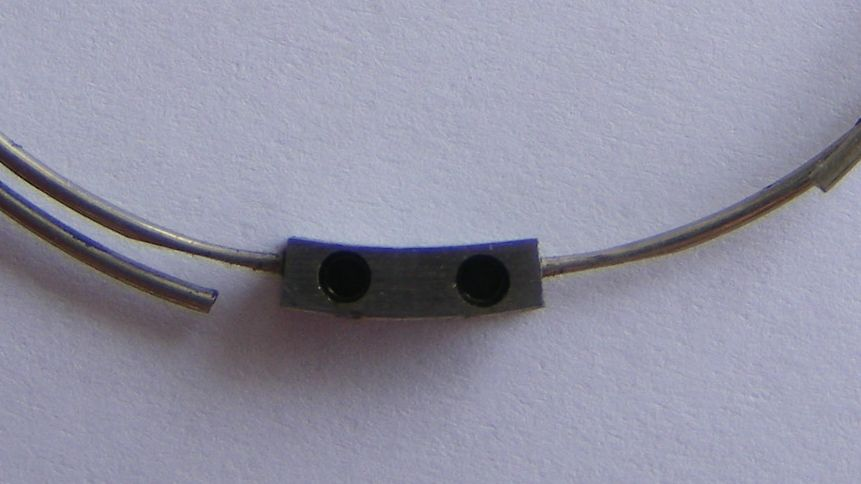
Gong support point, showing hollowing to lower tone.

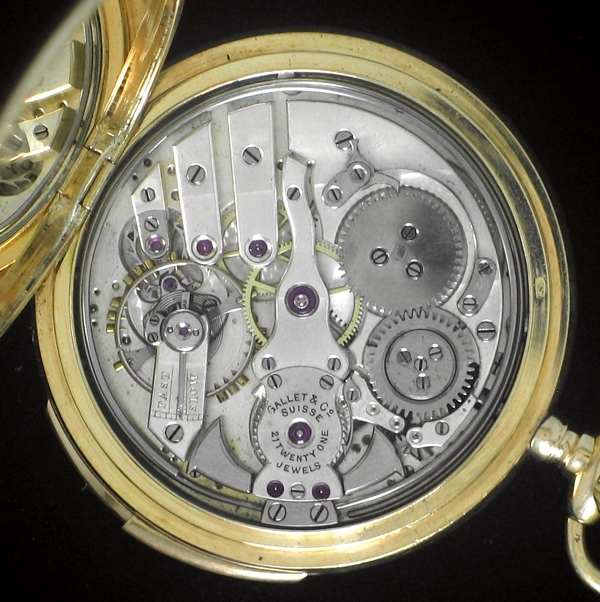
Close-up of a minute repeating pocket watch movement showing placement of the gong and hammers, manufactured by the Gallet family in 1905.

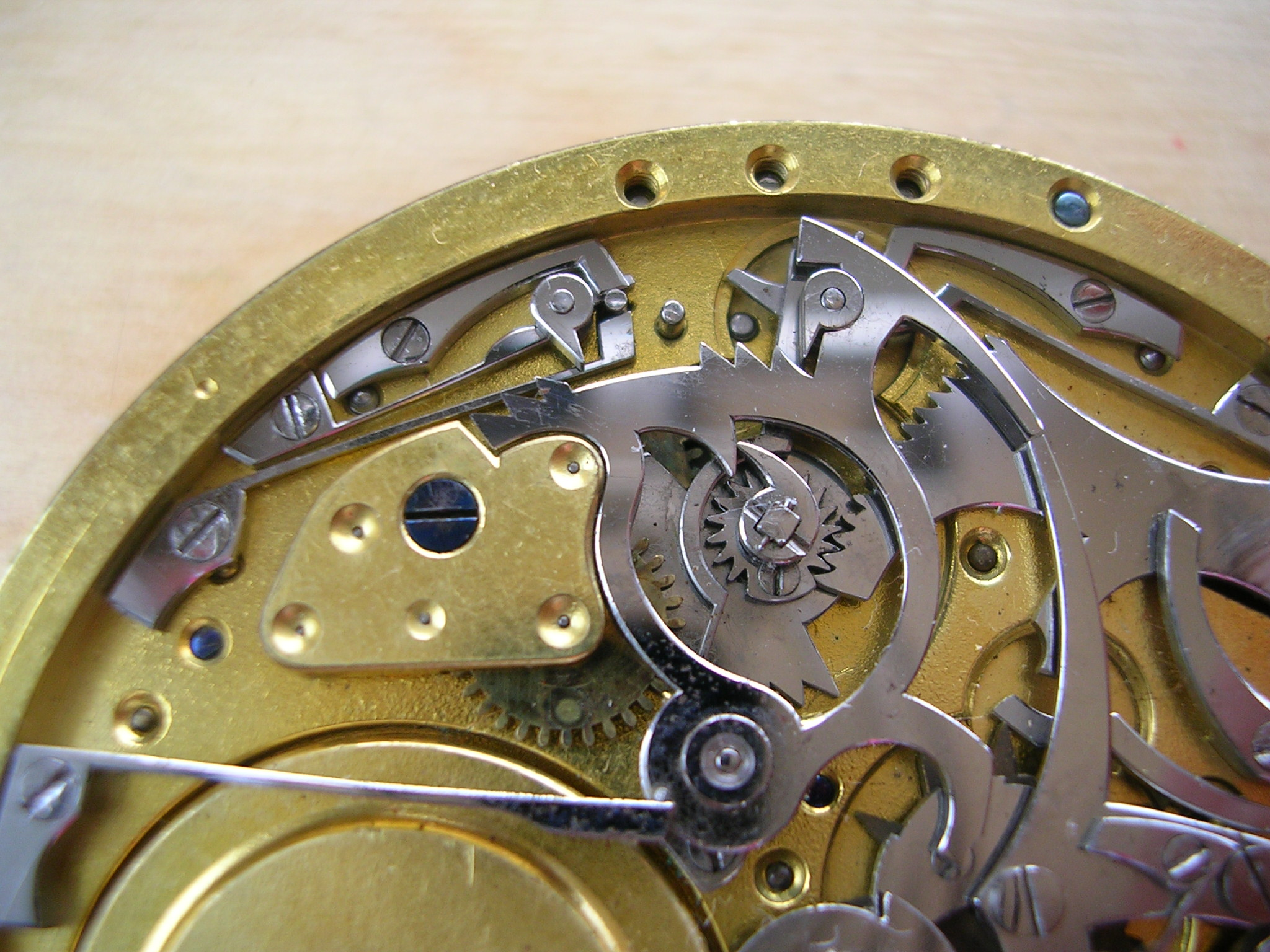
Closeup of a quarter repeater movement, dial side (with dial removed)

== See also ==
- Repeater (disambiguation)

== Bibliography ==
- Francois Crespe (1804) Essai sur les montres a répétition, JJ Paschoud, Geneva. Available on Google books at https://books.google.com/books?id=PLU-AAAAcAAJ, also reprinted in 2011 by Origami. English translation: Essay on Repeater Watches, Richard Watkins, Australia.
- John Huguenin (1897) Etablissage et Repassage des Montres à Répétition, Journal Suisse d'Horlogerie. 48 pages. No drawing. Reprinted 2011 by Origami.
- Emile James (1899) Traité des Sonneries, Librairie Stapelmohr. 99 pages, 59 drawings. An advertisement for this book appeared on 4 February 1900 issue of the bi-weekly Swiss journal La Fédération Horlogère (page 60). Reprinted 2011 by Origami.
- C. T. Etchells (1917) Repairing Repeating Watches, Hazlitt & Walker, Chicago. 26 pages, 11 drawings.
- Ch. Poncet (1938) L'horloger. tome. II., sonneries d'horloges et de montres. 224 pages.
- Emanuel Seibel and Orville R. Hagans Ed. (1945) Complicated Watches, The Roberts Publishing Co., Denver Colorado.
- François Lecoultre (1952), A Guide to Complicated Watches (Les Montres Compliquées), A. Simonin, Neuchâtel, Switzerland.
- J. H. Francis Wadsworth (1965) A History of Repeating Watches, Offprint from Antiquarian Horology (originally published in parts from September 1965 to June 1966).
- Manfred Fritz (1991) IWC Grande Complication, Edition Stemmle. 240 pages. Pages 142-176 and 194-201 are about the minute repeater mechanism of the IWC Grande Complication watch.
- Roy Ehrhardt (1993) European Repeaters & Clock Watches, Book 1, Heart of America Press. ISBN 0-913902-72-1. A compilation of repeaters and clock watches found in auction catalogs over the years. 170 pages. A picture and a description of each watch is given. The watches are sorted by functions and brands. The Book 2 has not been released yet.
- Audemars Piguet (2002 ?) Les Heures Musicales, Audemars Piguet edition. 70 pages with many repeater watches (pocket and wristwatches) made by Audemars Piguet. This is not a commercial catalog.
- Curtis D. Thomson (2006) Decimal Points, an article about Kari Voutilainen's minute repeater, International Watch (May 2006): pp. 136–140.
- Ron DeCorte (2007) Exploring the Repeater (DVD and VHS), AWCI editions. Duration : 1 hour 30'.
- Bob Stuart (2009) The Sound of Minute Repeaters , Vanity Fair (May 2009). 4 Pages. An audiophile comparison between 8 modern minute repeaters.
- Richard Watkins (2017) The Repeater. 100 Pages. A detailed, technical study of repeaters and grande sonnerie watches.
