= Czapek & Cie =

Swiss watch brand

Czapek & Cie SA
- Type: Privately held company
- Industry: Watchmaking
- Founded: 1845 (original); 21 October 2011 (current company)
- Founder: François Czapek (1845); Harry Guhl, Xavier de Roquemaurel, Sébastien Follonier (revival)
- Headquarters: Geneva, Switzerland
- Key people: Xavier de Roquemaurel, CEO
- Products: Wristwatches
- Website: czapek.com

Czapek & Cie is an independent Swiss watch manufacturer headquartered in Geneva, named after the Czech-born Polish watchmaker François Czapek (born 1811). The original company was founded in Geneva in 1845 by Czapek, who supplied timepieces to the court of Emperor Napoleon III and other European patrons before the firm passed to successors in the late nineteenth century. The name was revived in 2011, and the modern brand presented its first collection, Quai des Bergues, in November 2015, financed in part through an equity crowdfunding campaign.

In 2016, the Quai des Bergues No. 33bis received the Public Prize at the Grand Prix d'Horlogerie de Genève. The brand has since introduced the Place Vendôme, Faubourg de Cracovie, Antarctique and Promenade collections, and in 2022 inaugurated its own manufacture in La Chaux-de-Fonds.

== François Czapek ==
Franciszek Czapek was a Czech-born, Polish master watchmaker who arrived in Geneva in May 1832 following his participation in the November Uprising of 1830, as part of the Great Emigration of Polish refugees. Soon after his arrival, he gallicised his name, becoming François Czapek. In 1834 he created the firm Czapek & Moreau with the Swiss watchmaker Moreau, from Versoix. On 22 October 1836, Czapek married Marie, the daughter of clock- and watchmaker Jonas Pierre François Gevril de Carouge (1777–1854).

Czapek was the author of the first book on watchmaking published in the Polish language, Słów kilka o Zegarmistrzowstwie ku użytku zegarmistrzów i publiczności ("Remarks on watchmaking for the use of watchmakers and the public"), printed in 1850 in Leipzig.

On 1 May 1839, Antoni Patek and François Czapek established a six-year partnership in Geneva under the name Patek, Czapek & Cie, headquartered at Quai des Bergues 29. Watches produced by the partnership are held in horological collections including the Patek Philippe Museum and have appeared at major auctions. Czapek was head of watchmaking (finisseur), while Patek led sales and the company. From July 1840 the firm gradually came to employ around half a dozen workmen, several of them Poles, and produced approximately 200 watches a year.

After the partnership was dissolved in 1845, Patek established what became Patek Philippe with Adrien Philippe, while Czapek founded Czapek & Cie with another Polish émigré, Juliusz Grużewski.

== Czapek & Cie (1845–c. 1869) ==
In 1845 François Czapek founded Czapek & Cie with his new partner Juliusz Grużewski (1808–1865), a friend of Napoleon III. The firm's registration is recorded in the State Archives of Geneva on 23 March 1847. Czapek became a supplier to the court of Napoleon III and operated an atelier in Geneva, a shop in Paris at 28 Place Vendôme (established 1850) and another in Warsaw (established 1854).

From 1855, Czapek & Cie supplied watches to Napoleon III, many of which were given by the Emperor as diplomatic gifts. Czapek's clientele also included Khedive Ismail Pasha of Egypt and the Golitsyn family.

The company changed hands around 1869, for reasons that are not documented; Czapek's date of death is unknown. A surviving stem-winding pocket calendar watch bears an inscription on the inside of the case reading, in translation, "Former Establishment Czapek and Company / No. 10630 / A. Chaillet Successor / 84 Rue du 4 Septembre / Paris", indicating that the business continued for some time under successor ownership.

=== Gallery ===
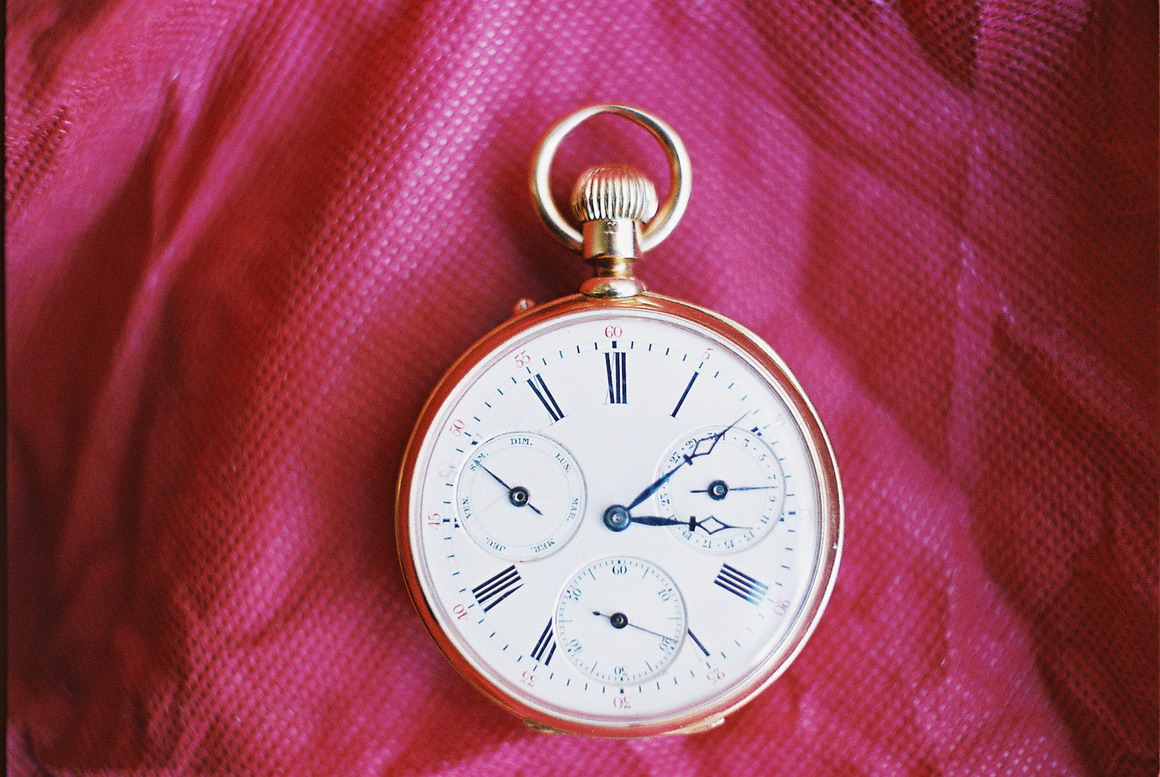
An open-face pocket watch Czapek & Cie., 18 karat gold

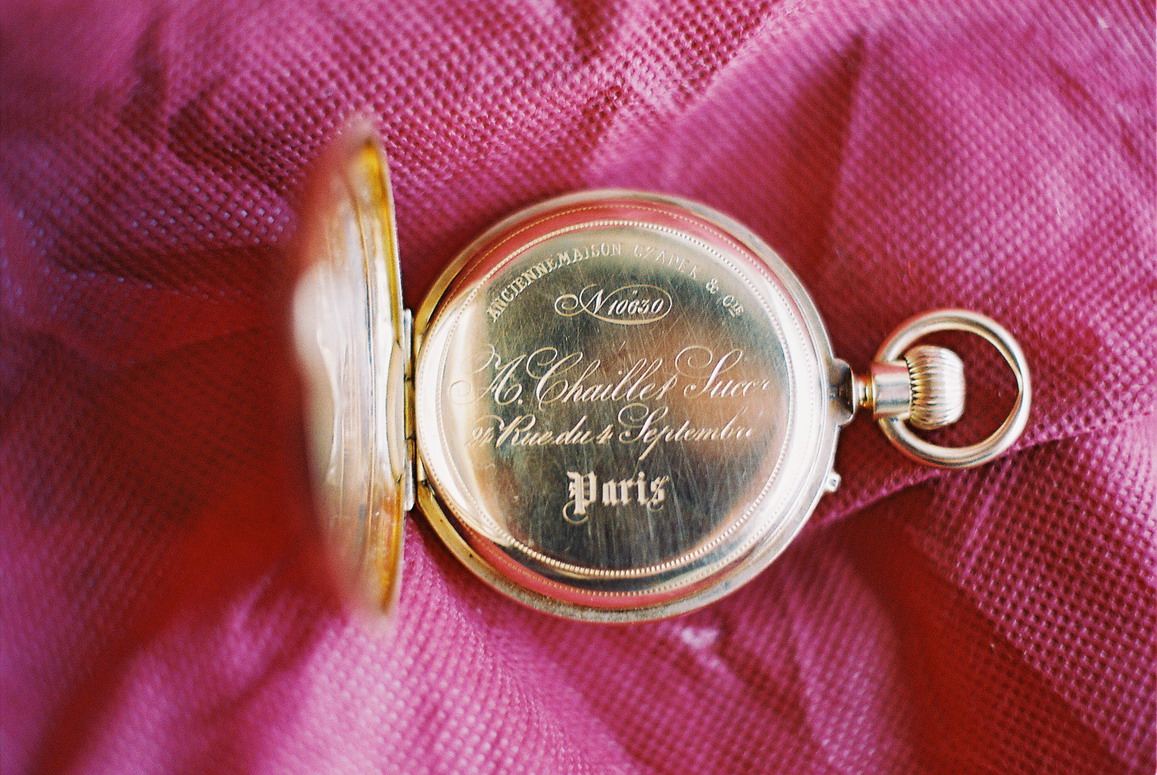
Back cover open, movement cover with engraved name of the watchmaker, serial number 10630, and (probably) the name of the store for which it was made

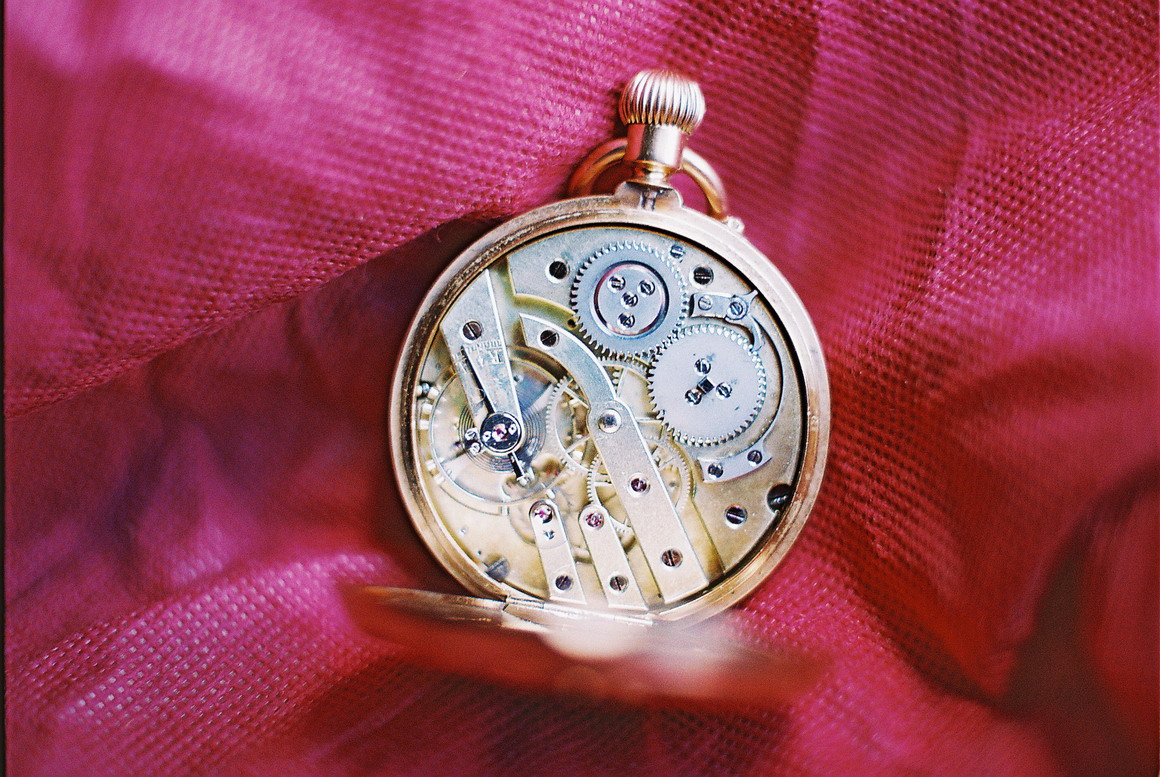
Watch movement

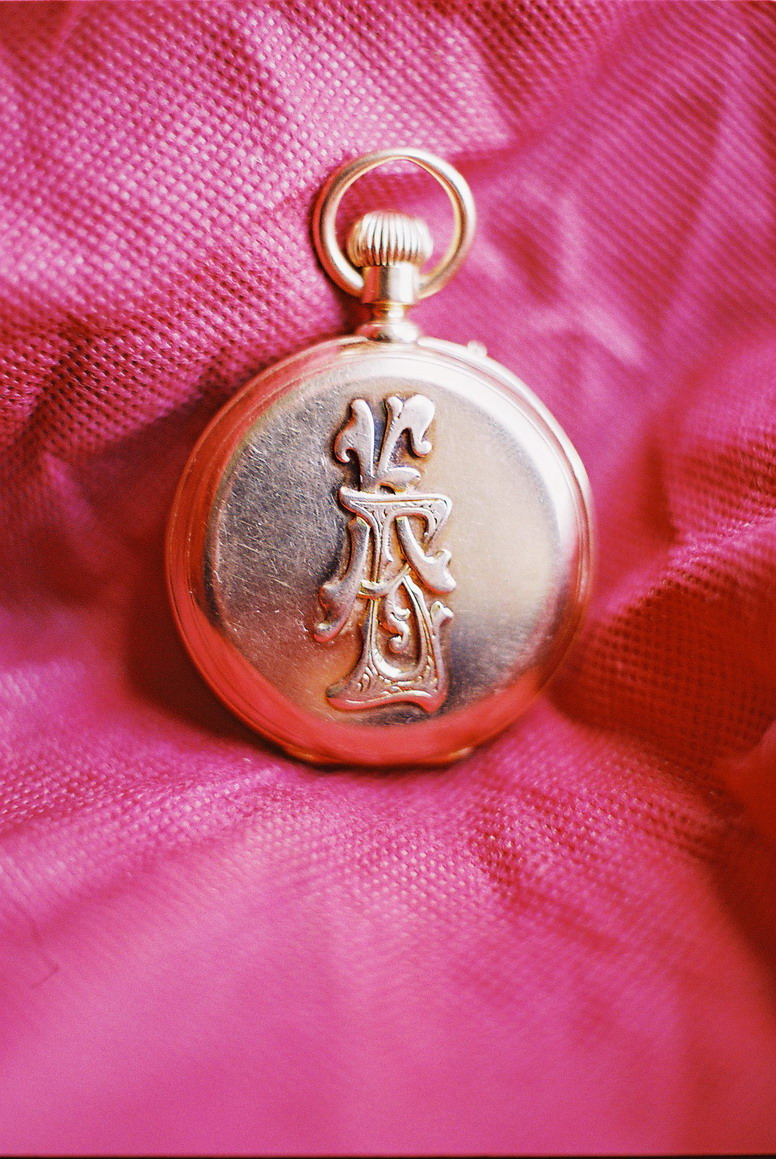
Back cover with insignia

== Modern revival (2011–present) ==
The company that became Czapek & Cie SA was registered in Geneva on 21 October 2011 under the name Lissignol SA, and was renamed Czapek & Cie SA on 12 December 2012. The revival brought together Harry Guhl, Xavier de Roquemaurel and the watchmaker Sébastien Follonier. Roquemaurel, who had previously held sales and marketing roles at L'Oréal, Loewe, Ermenegildo Zegna and Ebel, met Guhl in 2013, and the three decided to revive the brand. An early model, the Czapek Design Study Chronograph, was sold to a small circle of friends.

The company raised CHF 500,000 in spring 2015 to deliver its first pre-series. In November 2015 it launched an equity crowdfunding campaign regulated by the Swiss financial regulator FINMA, run through the platforms Raizers in Switzerland and France and Crowd for Angels in the United Kingdom. The campaign raised a total of CHF 1.1 million from 93 new shareholders. The trade publication WorldTempus later described the approach as unprecedented in the luxury industry.

The first modern collection, Quai des Bergues, was named after the street on which Czapek had his workshop and presented in November 2015. Its design was based on an 1850 Czapek pocket watch, and it was powered by the proprietary manual-winding calibre SXH1, developed by the movement specialist Chronode under Jean-François Mojon, with twin spring barrels providing a seven-day power reserve. In 2016 the Quai des Bergues No. 33bis received the Public Prize (Prix du Public) at the Grand Prix d'Horlogerie de Genève.

== Business model ==
Czapek is owned by around 200 shareholders drawn from its successive funding rounds; by 2025 the company had raised over US$5.5 million across six fundraising rounds. Harry Guhl, who no longer serves as the brand's president, remained its primary shareholder as of 2023.

After strong interest from retailers at the brand's first Baselworld in 2016 failed to convert into sales, Czapek began selling directly online, an approach WorldTempus described as "unheard-of in haute horlogerie". In a 2018 interview, Roquemaurel said: "we make every watch from scratch, we don't hold stock but we aim for three weeks turnaround from order to delivery."

== Manufacture ==
In 2022, Czapek inaugurated its own manufacture in La Chaux-de-Fonds, a renovated facility integrating machining, milling and polishing operations. At the time of the expansion, output had grown from around 180 watches per year before the COVID-19 pandemic to roughly 800 per year, with a stated mid-term goal of up to 3,000. Components are quality-controlled in-house, and each watch is assembled from start to finish by a single watchmaker.

== Collections ==
- Quai des Bergues (2015) – the brand's first modern collection, with the SXH1 calibre and a seven-day power reserve.
- Place Vendôme (2017) – the second collection, a tourbillon with a second time zone.
- Faubourg de Cracovie (2018) – the brand's first chronograph, unveiled at Baselworld 2018.
- Antarctique (2020) – a sports watch powered by the brand's first in-house movement.
- Promenade (2024).

=== Antarctique ===
The Antarctique, the brand's first sports watch, was introduced on 26 May 2020. Its automatic SXH5 movement, wound by a micro-rotor, was the brand's first movement produced entirely in-house; the design team included the constructors Emmanuel Bouchet and Daniel Martinez.

== Calibres ==
Czapek numbers its movements sequentially. Calibre 4 was not a watch movement but a time-measuring device, the "Sands of Time" hourglass, co-created with Moser Glassworks in 2019.

Calibre	Year	Watch	Notes
SXH1	2015	Quai des Bergues	Manual winding; twin barrels, seven-day power reserve; developed by Chronode
SXH2	2017	Place Vendôme	One-minute tourbillon; developed with Chronode
SXH3	2018	Faubourg de Cracovie	Automatic integrated chronograph with column wheel and vertical clutch; developed by Vaucher Manufacture Fleurier
SXH4	2019	Sands of Time hourglass	Not a watch movement; co-created with Moser Glassworks
SXH5	2020	Antarctique	First movement produced entirely in-house; automatic, micro-rotor
SXH6	2021	Antarctique Rattrapante	Split-seconds chronograph developed with Chronode
SXH7	2023	Antarctique Révélation	Skeletonised automatic; 152 components, 4 Hz, 60-hour power reserve, platinum micro-rotor, small seconds at 4:30
Calibre 8	2023	Place Vendôme Complicité	Two balances, each with its own escapement, linked by a differential; developed with Bernhard Lederer's MHM; 293 components, 72-hour power reserve
Calibre 9	2025	Antarctique Tourbillon	Flying tourbillon, 72-hour power reserve; designed, constructed and mostly machined in-house
Calibre 10.01	2025	Time Jumper	Two-disc jumping-hour system with 24-hour display

== Awards ==
- 2016 – Public Prize, Grand Prix d'Horlogerie de Genève, for the Quai des Bergues No. 33bis.

== 2025 releases ==
In 2025, marking the 180th anniversary of the original founding in 1845 and ten years since the revival of the brand, Czapek released:

- Antarctique Tourbillon – a 40.5 mm flying tourbillon powered by Calibre 9.
- Antarctique Plique-à-Jour – a limited edition of 10 pieces with a plique-à-jour enamel dial, powered by the SXH7.
- Time Jumper – a jumping-hour watch powered by Calibre 10.01, with a patent-pending mechanism displaying 24 hours on two discs, unveiled in Geneva on 12 November 2025. Production of the calibre is limited to 180 movements, including 100 pieces in stainless steel and 30 in 18-carat 3N gold, with the remainder reserved for special projects including 10 bespoke pieces.
- Quai des Bergues "Sursum Corda" – an 18-carat rose gold model with a seven-day power reserve.
