= Cortina =

Cortina may refer to:

== Things ==
- Cortina (tango), a short piece of music played during a tango dance event
- Ford Cortina, a medium-sized family car built by Ford of Britain from 1962 to 1982
  - Lotus Cortina, a 1963–1968 performance variant of the above
- Cortina (mycology), a cobweb-like partial veil on certain types of mushrooms (which gives the name to the genus Cortinarius)
- MV Cortina, a Panamanian passenger ship in service from 1996 to 1997

== Places ==
- Cortina d'Ampezzo, a town in the province of Belluno, northern Italy
- Cortina sulla strada del vino, Italian name of Kurtinig an der Weinstraße, a town in South Tyrol, northern Italy
- Cortina Elementary School, in Queen Creek, Arizona
- Cortina Indian Rancheria, California, a Native American reservation in Colusa County, California

== People ==
- Cortina (surname)

== Companies ==
- Cortina, a Dutch bicycle brand
- Cortina Cycles, a defunct US manufacturer of mountain bike frames based in Santa Barbara, California
- Cortina Systems, a fabless semiconductor company headquartered in Sunnyvale, California
- Cortina Watch, a Singapore-based luxury watch retailer
