= Cortines =

Cortines is a Spanish surname and may refer to:

== Locations ==
- Adolfo Ruiz Cortines (city), city in Sinaloa, Mexico, named after the president
- Estación de Ruiz Cortines, railway station in Monterrey, Mexico, named after the president
- Ramón C. Cortines School of Visual and Performing Arts, arts school in Los Angeles, United States

== Surname ==
- Adolfo Ruiz Cortines (1889–1973), President of Mexico from 1952 to 1958
- Andreu Cortines Jaumot (1909–1989), Catalan socialist
- Cristina Gutiérrez-Cortines (b. 1939), Spanish People's Party politician
- Felipe Cortines y Murube (1883–1961), Spanish writer
- Jacobo Cortines (b. 1946), Spanish writer and academic
- Jordi Morera i Cortines (b. 1947), Catalan engineer, professor, and politician
- José Cortines (1782–1855), Spanish military engineer
- José Guillermo Cortines (b. 1973), Dominican actor and singer
- José Luis Caso Cortines (1933–1997), Spanish politician
- Manuel "Maito" Fernández Cortines (1934–2023), Puerto Rican theater producer
- Ramón C. Cortines (b. 1932), American educator

== See also ==
- Cortina (disambiguation)
- Cortiñas (disambiguation)
