= Gilbert Albert =

Swiss jeweler (1930–2019)

Gilbert Albert (September 20, 1930 – October 1, 2019) was a Swiss jeweler. He established his jewelry house and opened his own atelier in 1962. Thereafter he designed art jewelry, mostly using 18 karat gold with rough cut stones and unconventional materials, such as fossilized dinosaur bones and hardened lava rocks. The brand has boutiques in Geneva, Zurich, Moscow, Paris, and its flagship store in New York City.

== Early years ==
Albert was born on September 20, 1930, in Geneva. He began training and designing at the age of 15 at l’Ecole des Arts Industriels. Albert's father "instilled a love of nature into [him] right from [his] childhood". His talent was noticed by Patek Philippe when he was only 25. He worked there as part of the designer team and was head of the workshop from 1955 to 1962, during which he coined signature asymmetrical watches for the house. He also worked with Omega SA watchmakers before opening his own atelier in 1962. He was the most rewarded Diamonds International Awards jeweler; which he received 10 times; three for Patek Philippe, two for Omega and five under his own workshop.

== Sculpture and jewelry ==
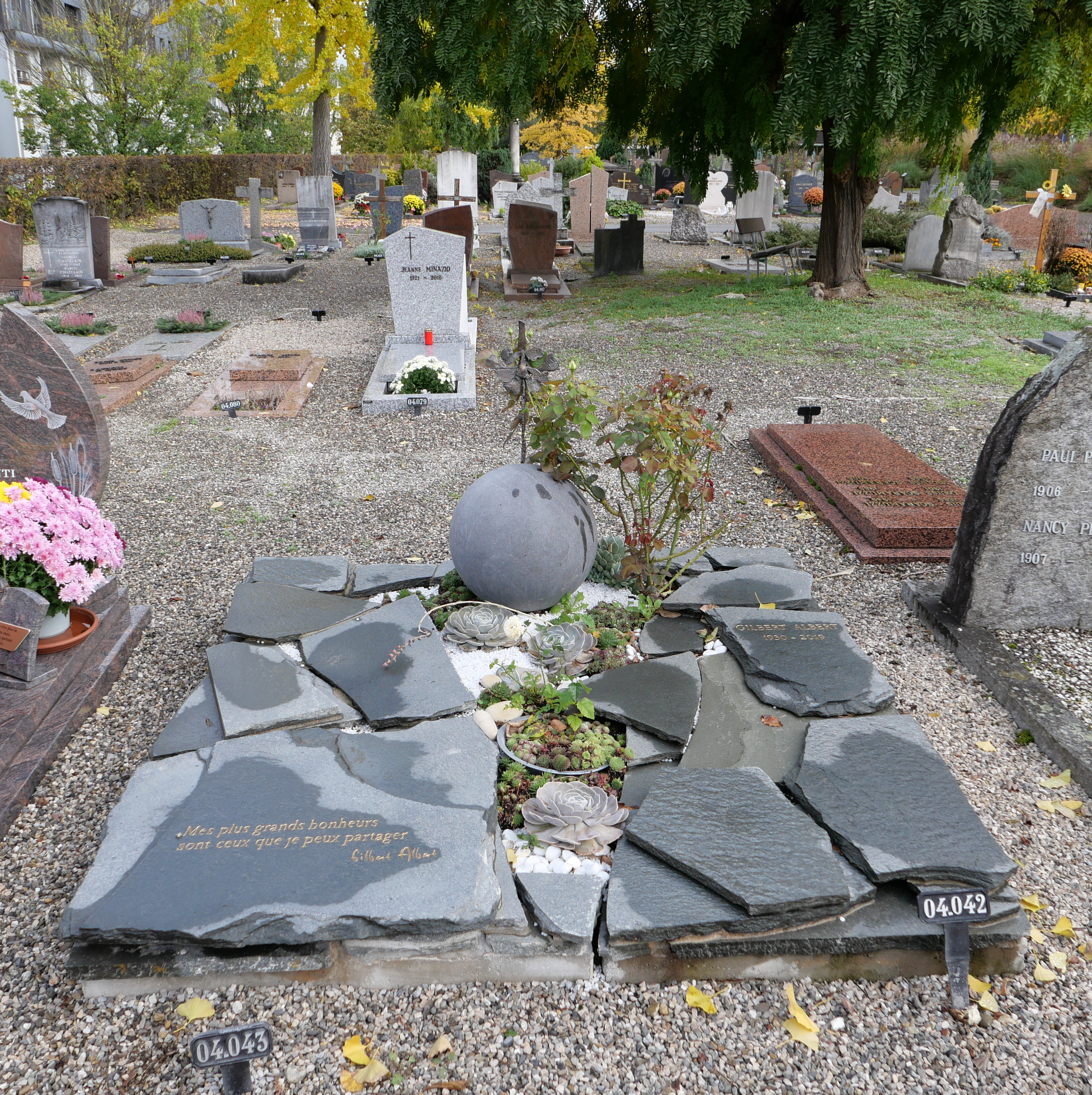
Albert's grave at the cemetery of Carouge. It bears the inscription: Mes plus grands bonheurs sont ceux que je peux partager (“My greatest joys are those I can share”)

Known for his unconventional use of materials, Albert used scarabs, meteorites, lava rocks and dinosaur bones. He once said that "in the enchanted world of jewelry, every piece must be original in its execution".

== The company ==
After the October 2010 acquisition of the brand by Majid Pishyar, chairman of the 32Group company, the jewelry house entered into an international expansion plan. 2013 marks the brand's 60th anniversary, which has been celebrated in Geneva and Zurich as well as in newly opened boutiques in New York and Paris.
