= Piaski Szlacheckie =

- Village
- Location within Poland
- Coordinates: 50°56′N 23°4′E
- Country: Poland
- Voivodeship: Lublin
- County: Krasnystaw
- Gmina: Gorzków
- Population (approx.): 500

Piaski Szlacheckie (Polish pronunciation: [ˈpjaskʲi ʂlaˈxɛtskʲɛ]) is a village in the administrative district of Gmina Gorzków, within Krasnystaw County, Lublin Voivodeship, in eastern Poland.

== Notable residents ==
- Antoni Patek (1812-1877) - watchmaker, founder of Patek Philippe & Co.
