= Charles & Keith =

Singaporean fashion company

Charles & Keith Pte. Ltd.

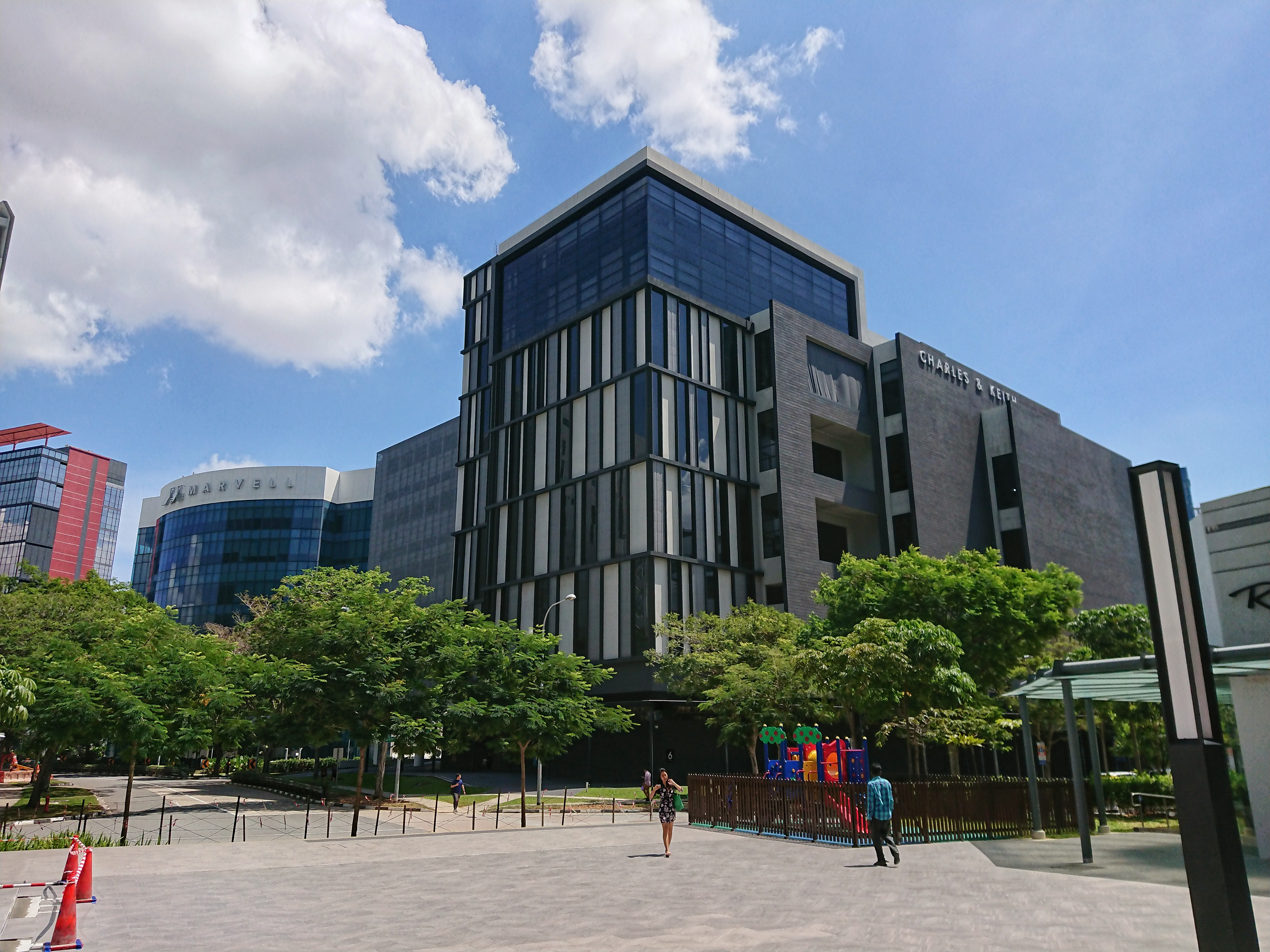
- Charles and Keith headquarters in Singapore
- Type: Private
- Industry: Fashion
- Founded: 1996; 30 years ago
- Founders: Charles & Keith Wong
- Headquarters: 6 Tai Seng Link, Singapore 534101
- Area served: Worldwide
- Key people: Charles Wong (Founder); Keith Wong (Founder & Chief Executive); Fong Shee Beng (Executive Director)
- Website: www.charleskeith.com/sg

Charles & Keith Pte. Ltd., styled as CHARLES & KEITH and also known as C&K, is a Singaporean fashion house label founded in 1996, specializing in footwear, handbags and fashion accessories. Based in Singapore, the brand has a global footprint, operating more than 600 stores worldwide across 37 countries.

== History ==
=== Founding ===
The company started out in 1990, when Charles Wong and his younger brother Keith Wong worked at their parent's shoe store in the Ang Mo Kio district of Singapore. They had wanted to learn the ropes of managing a shoe business before subsequently opening their first store in 1996 at Amara Shopping Centre (now known as the 100 AM).

Charles & Keith adopted a new business model for their label because they observed that the traditional model of selling shoes purchased from wholesale suppliers was unsustainable. To emerge from intense competition, the company started designing their own shoes in 1997 based on customers' feedback. This allowed the company to gain greater brand recognition from their target clientele. As the business grew, the company cut out the middleman and began working directly with production factories as a unique brand.

=== Expansion ===
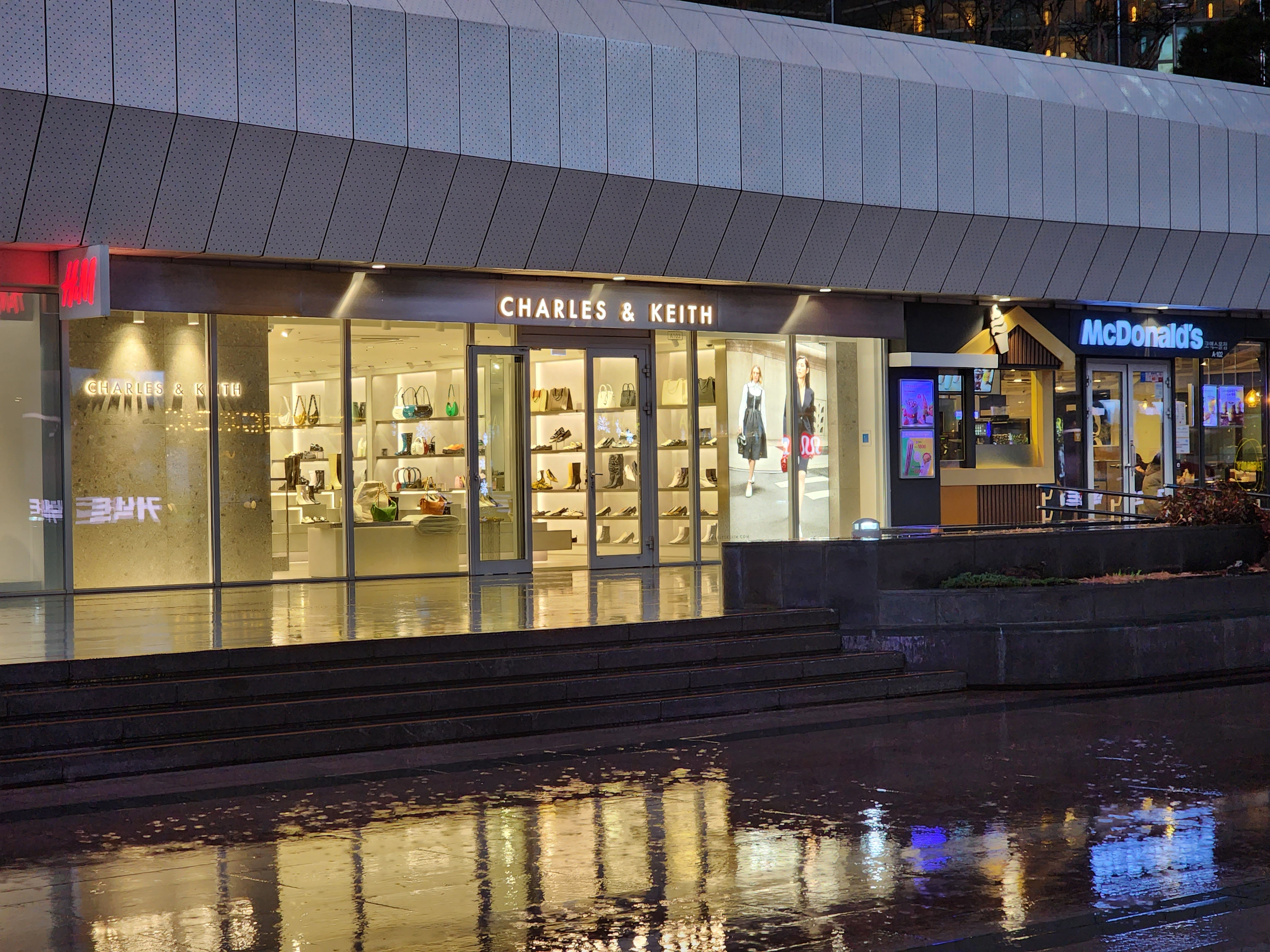
A Charles & Keith store at the Starfield COEX Mall in Seoul, South Korea

In 1998, Charles & Keith began to expand their operations overseas beyond Singapore when they ventured into Indonesia and Australia.

In 2001, Charles & Keith opened their first store in the Philippines and by 2015, they had more than 30 stores around the country. In 2004, the company ventured out of Asia and debuted in the Middle East with a store in Dubai, and another in Saudi Arabia in 2005. In 2011, the brand had over 230 stores across the world mostly based in the Middle East and Asia.

Charles & Keith launched Pedro in 2005, which is a line of men's footwear. Their product range was increased in 2007 to include accessories such as belts and sunglasses and higher end products.

In 2011, LVMH (Louis Vuitton Moet Hennessy) invested in a 20 percent stake in the company. The Wong brothers have since bought their shares back from LVMH.

As of 2015, Charles & Keith has over 300 stores worldwide.

In January 2022, Charles & Keith opened its third concept boutique at Kaohsiung's E Sky Mall. Spanning approximately 302 sqm, the Kaohsiung location is the brand's largest store in Taiwan.

In 2024, CHARLES & KEITH opened three flagship stores in Shibuya, Japan; Jewel Changi Airport, Singapore; and Chengdu, China.

=== Online store ===
In 2004, Charles & Keith became one of the first few companies in the world to set up an e-commerce website in an effort to expand its business, allowing the company to offer its products where it did not have a brick and mortar store.

In 2021, Charles & Keith announced that such digitalisation processes were accelerated amid the COVID-19 pandemic. It added that the company now provides distance training for its 7,000 staff members worldwide, as well as hosting online sales presentations to wholesale buyers wherever they are in the world in contrast to hosting physical wholesale events up to four times a year at its headquarters in Tai Seng.

Awards

The company has secured numerous awards, including the Singapore Retailers Association's Excellent Service Award in 2002 and the Enterprise Award at the 2008 Singapore Business Awards.

Charles & Keith Group co-founder and chief executive officer Charles Wong has been named Businessman of the Year at the 2024 Singapore Business Awards (SBA).

== See also ==
- Cortina Watch
