= Annual calendar =

An annual calendar is a representation of the year that expires with the year represented, or that must be altered annually to remain current. The term takes different but related meanings across two contexts. One is for static (synchronic) calendars, such as wall calendars or calendar systems. The other is for dynamic (diachronic) calendars, such as digital calendars or timepieces. Static representations of the Gregorian calendar year are annual, because the weekdays of Gregorian dates vary from year to year. The calendar representing one year will not serve for the next year. With perennial calendars, the same representation of the year serves for every year. Perpetual calendars, in this context, are computation devices for determining the weekdays of dates in any given year, or for representing a wide range of annual calendars.

An annual calendar in the dynamic context of watchmaking is a feature of a mechanical watch. A timepiece with an annual calendar displays the hour, day, date and month, with the first of the month automatically adjusted following months of 30 or 31 days. Manual correction will often be required for the first of March, however, following the 28 days of February, or 29 in leap years. An annual timepiece calendar is less complicated and expensive than a perpetual timepiece calendar, which will not require manual adjustment till 2100. That year will not be a leap year, even though its number is evenly divisible by 4. The first annual calendar indicator introduced for a wristwatch was patented in 1996 by Patek Philippe. Since 1996, the mechanism of an annual calendar was continuously improved. It is now used in watch manufacture by several watchmaking companies. The annual calendar is not a common feature. It can be found in: Omega (De Ville Hour Vision Annual Calendar, Seamaster Aqua Terra Annual Calendar, Constellation Annual Calendar), Breitling (Navitimer Olympus), Bvlgari (Bvlgari Annual Calendar), Ulysse Nardin (Marine Chronograph), Patek Philippe (Ref. 5035, 5135, 5146, 5147, 5396 and 5960), Rolex (Sky Dweller), and Zenith (Captain Winsor).

== See also ==
- Perennial calendar
- Perpetual calendar
