= Cortina (surname) =

Cortina is a surname. Notable people with the surname include:

- Adela Cortina, Spanish philosopher
- Alfonso Cortina (1944–2020), Spanish businessman
- Jon Cortina (1934–2005), Spanish Jesuit priest
- Juan Cortina (1824–1894), Mexican rancher, politician, military leader, outlaw, and folk hero
  - Cortina Troubles (1859–1861), in which paramilitary forces led by Juan Cortina engaged various regular and militia forces

== See also ==
- Cortina (disambiguation)
