= Adrien Philippe =

French watchmaker (1815–1894)

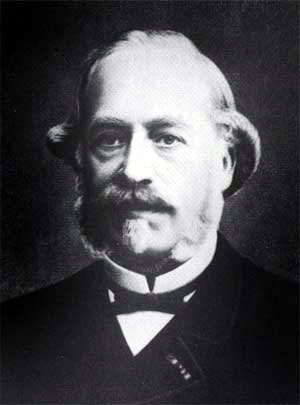
- Adrien Philippe (1815–1894)
- Born: 16 April 1815; La Bazoche-Gouet
- Died: 5 January 1894 (aged 78); Geneva
- Occupation: Watchmaker, businessperson
- Awards: Chevalier of the Legion of Honour

Jean Adrien Philippe (16 April 1815, La Bazoche-Gouet, Eure-et-Loir – 5 January 1894) was a French horologist and cofounder of watchmaker Patek Philippe & Co. of Geneva, Switzerland.

In 1842, Adrien Philippe invented a mechanism for watches which allowed them to be wound and set by means of a crown rather than a key. His patented invention earned him a Bronze Medal at the French Industrial Exposition of 1844 (World's Fair). At the Exhibition, Adrien Philippe first met Antoni Patek and a year later became head watchmaker at Patek & Co. in Geneva under an agreement that entitled him to one third of all company profits.

Adrien Philippe proved to be very capable at his craft and a product innovator whose value to the firm was such that by 1851 he was made a full partner and the firm began operating as Patek Philippe & Co. In 1863 he published a book in Geneva and Paris on the workings of pocket watches titled Les montres sans clef.

In 1875, Adrien Philippe commissioned a watch that he later gave his daughter, Louise, as a wedding present, which is known as the only wristwatch dating back to be owned by either Patek or Philippe. This historical watch is known as “The Watchmaker’s Daughter” and was auctioned at Sotheby’s in 2023 by the descendants of Adrien Philippe. The watch was purchased most probably by the Patek Philippe Museum though this is not confirmed and may be owned by a private collector. The wedding between Louise and Joseph Antoine Bénassy-Philippe that the watch was presented at is noted as the wedding that saved Patek Philippe by providing the company a much needed successor to Antoni Patek for the company to survive the founding generation.

His partner Antoni Patek died in 1877 and in 1891 the 76-year-old Adrien Philippe handed over the day-to-day management of the business to his son Joseph Emile Philippe and Francois Antoine Conty.

Jean Adrien Philippe died in 1894.
