= Cortina Cycles =

American bicycle frame manufacturer

- Type: Private
- Industry: Bicycles
- Founded: 1955; 71 years ago
- Headquarters: 2024 Mountain Ave, Santa Barbara, California 93101, USA
- Key people: Raul Cortina, Esteban Cortina, Adrian Cortina, Daniel Cortina
- Products: Bicycle Frames
- Parent: Bici-Cortina (Mexico)
- Website: www.cortinacycles.com

Cortina Cycles was a bicycle frame manufacturer in Santa Barbara, California. It has made frames for Italian companies such as Bennotto and Gios.

== Background ==
Raul Cortina, his brother and uncle started Cortina Cycles in Mexico in 1955, in a small bike shop in Mexico City. It acquired factory outlets within Mexico selling Cortina frames and moved into the factory it still owns in Mexico. Cortina Cycles built frames for companies such as Bennotto and Gios.

Raul Cortina's son, Esteban, started designing mountain bike frames ing the 1990s after graduating from college. He created Cortina Cycles USA in Santa Barbara, California with his brothers Daniel and Adrian, who are professional racers. Cortina in 1994 became one of the first to produce a downhill frame with 8 inches of rear travel. Cortina now make frames from BMX to tandems.

== Technological innovations ==
- Semi-Parallel Linkage of DHExtreme-8. This unique linkage design enables the rear triangle to move up and down on an almost vertical plane rather than pivoting about the bottom bracket conventionally. It therefore enables better tracking on the rear wheel.
- Fully Floating Linkage Design. This linkage design features on the Joyride and Europa-FS (semi-floating). This unique variation on the 4-bar linkage delivers progressive suspension whereby the ride becomes firmer as the shock is depressed. The shock is not attached directly to the static part of the frame at any point, hence 'floating'.
- Adjustable Wheel Base on 12 mm Thru-Axle. This axle setup features on the DHExtreme-8, Europa DS (12 mm version), Europa FS, and Triton DH. The Wheelbase can be adjusted horizontally by 1 inch to effect the handling of the bike. The axle is tightened with a 9 m allen key and memory locked with two smaller horizontal allen bolts, creating a very stiff wheelbase. The disk-brake mount and derailleur hanger make up either side of the moving section, and can therefore be replaced if damaged.
