= La Bazoche-Gouet =

- Commune
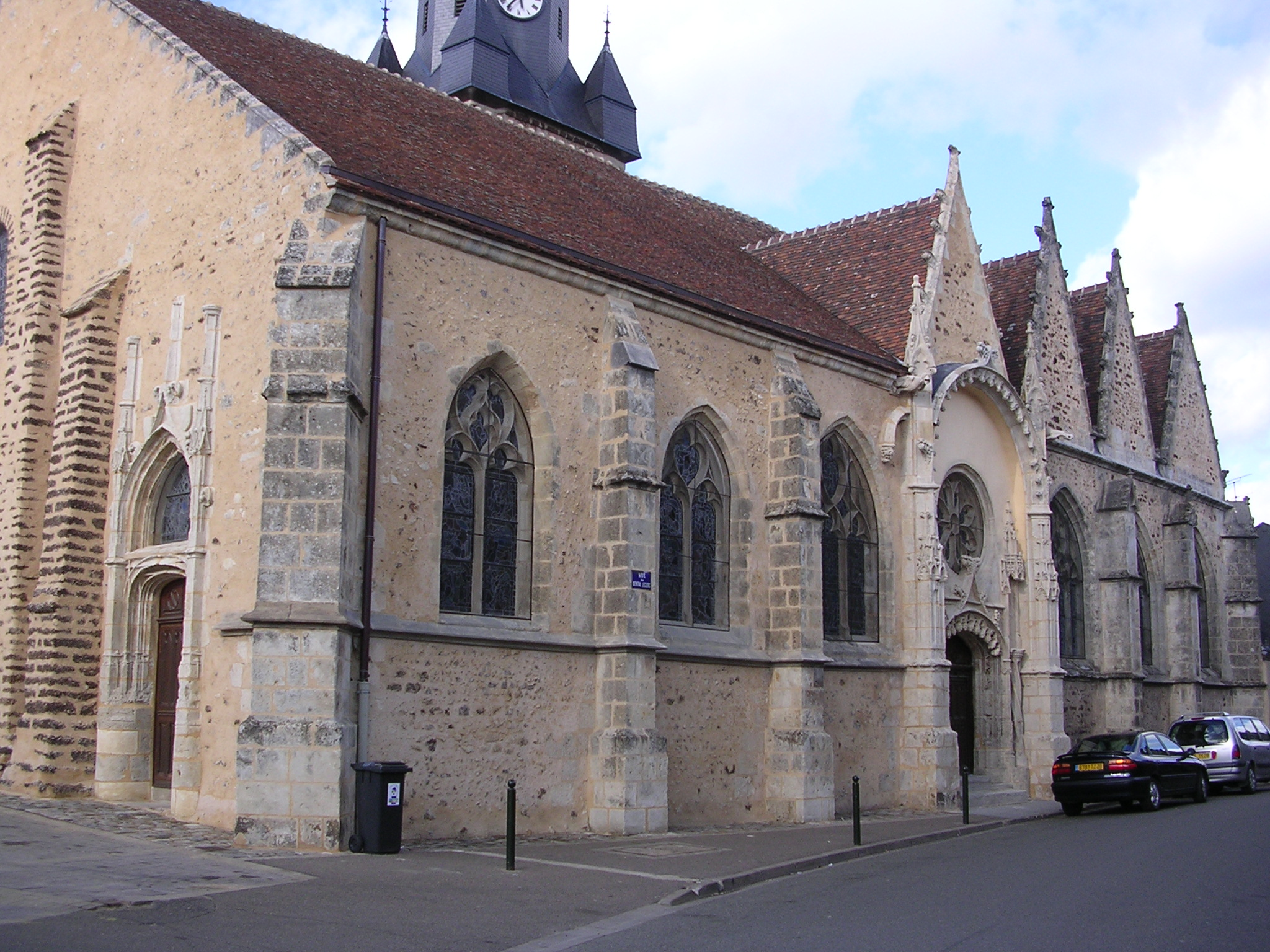
- The church in La Bazoche-Gouet

- Coat of arms
- Location of La Bazoche-Gouet
- Location within France Location within Centre-Val de Loire
- Coordinates: 48°08′22″N 0°58′53″E
- Country: France
- Region: Centre-Val de Loire
- Department: Eure-et-Loir
- Arrondissement: Nogent-le-Rotrou
- Canton: Brou
- Intercommunality: Grand Châteaudun

Government
  - Mayor (2020–2026): Jean-Paul Boudet
- Area^{1}: 37.44 km^{2} (14.46 sq mi)
- Elevation: 196 m (643 ft)
- Highest elevation: 229 m (751 ft)
- Lowest elevation: 164 m (538 ft)
- Population (2023): 1,234
  - Density: 32.96/km^{2} (85.36/sq mi)
- Time zone: UTC+01:00 (CET)
  - Summer (DST): UTC+02:00 (CEST)
- INSEE/Postal code: 28027 /28330
- ^{1} French Land Register data, which excludes lakes, ponds, glaciers > 1 km^{2} (0.386 sq mi or 247 acres) and river estuaries.

La Bazoche-Gouet (French pronunciation: [la bazɔʃ ɡwɛ]) is a commune in the Eure-et-Loir department in northern France.

== Population ==
Historical population
Year	Pop.	±% p.a.
1968	1,529	—
1975	1,451	−0.75%
1982	1,311	−1.44%
1990	1,281	−0.29%
1999	1,249	−0.28%
2007	1,303	+0.53%
2012	1,263	−0.62%
2017	1,224	−0.63%
2023	1,234	+0.14%
Source: INSEE

== See also ==
- Communes of the Eure-et-Loir department
