= Cortiñas =

Cortiñas may refer to:

== People ==
- Angela Cortiñas, American bishop
- Jorge Ignacio Cortiñas (1884–1940), Uruguayan political figure, journalist and playwright
- Nora Cortiñas (born 1930), Argentine social psychologist, activist, human rights defender

== Places ==
- Ismael Cortinas, town in the Flores Department of Uruguay

== Other ==
- The Cortinas (punk band), Bristol-based punk rock band, originally active between 1976 and 1978
