= Cortina (bicycle brand) =

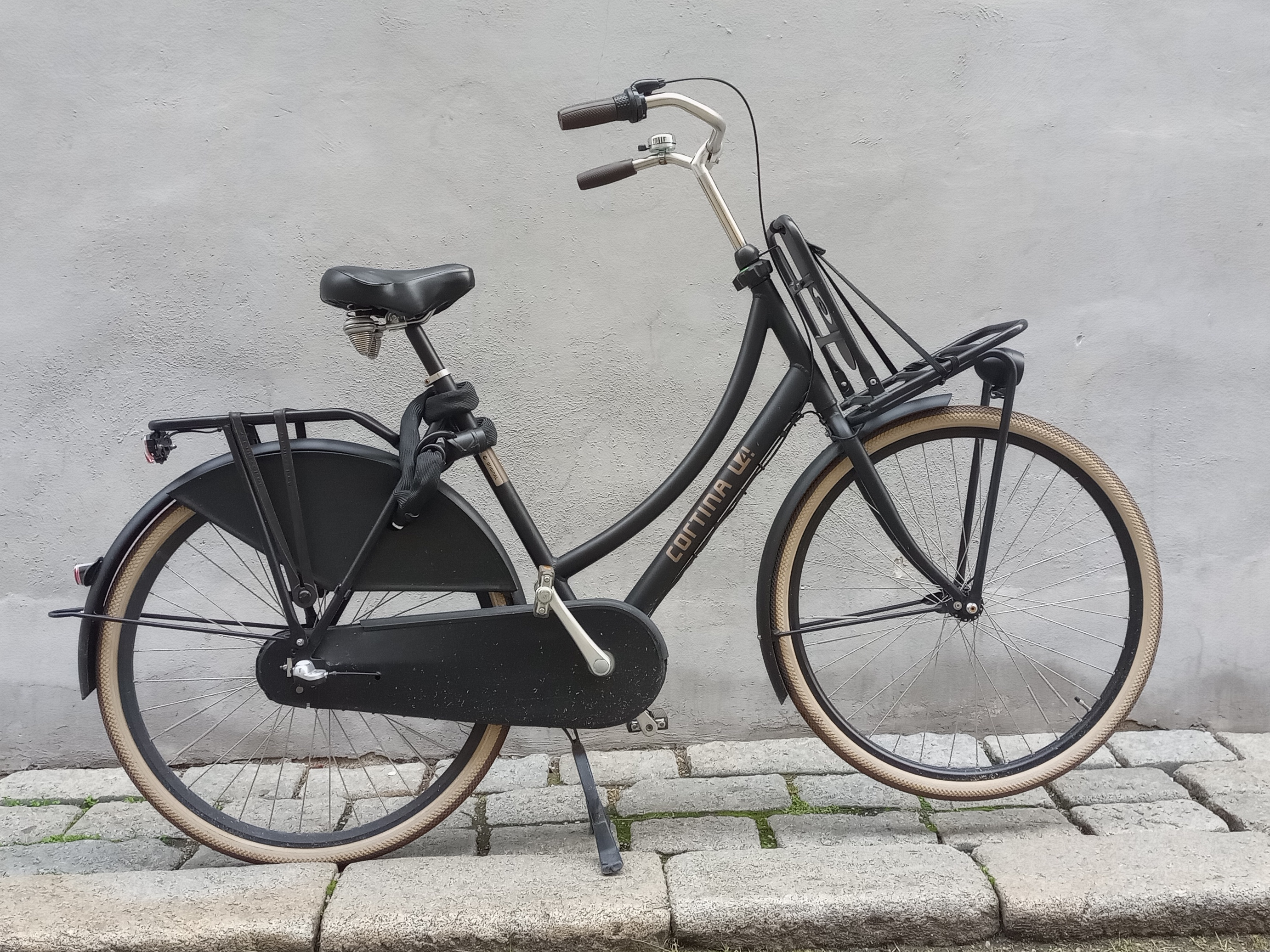
- Product type: Bicycles
- Current owner: Kruitbosch B.V.
- Country: Netherlands
- Introduced: 2006; 20 years ago
- Markets: Netherlands, Belgium, Germany, France
- Website: www.cortinabikes.com

Cortina is a bicycle brand by the Dutch bicycle wholesaler Kruitbosch in Zwolle. The production started in 2006, when the first 4000 bicycles were made. The brand is popular among teenagers in the Netherlands.
