= Franciszek Czapek =

Watchmaker

Franciszek Czapek (Czech: František Čapek, French: François Czapek; 4 April 1811 – disappeared 1871) was a Czech master watchmaker and partner of Antoni Patek in Patek, Czapek & Cie.

== Biography ==
Czapek was born on 4 April 1811 in Semonice (now part of Jaroměř), Bohemia, the son of Jan Czapek and Catherine, née Walaschek. He took part in the Polish November Uprising as a soldier of the National Guard, in Warsaw. After his arrival in Geneva, Switzerland (1 July 1832) he gallicised his name, thus becoming François Czapek. In 1834 he created the firm Czapek & Moreau with local Swiss watchmaker Moreau, from Versoix. On 22 October 1836, François Czapek married Marie, the daughter of clock and watchmaker Jonas Pierre François Gevril de Carouge (1777–1854).

In 1871, Czapek mysteriously disappeared.

== Patek, Czapek & Cie. (1839-1845) ==
On 1 May 1839, Antoni Patek and François Czapek established a six years partnership in Geneva under the name of PATEK, CZAPEK & CIE. This partnership produced some exceptional watches which are part of important horological collection or auctions. Czapek was head of watchmaking ("Finisseur") while Patek led the sales and the Company. As of July 1840, the firm came gradually to employ a half dozen workmen. Several were Poles: Lilpop from Warsaw; Henryk Majewski from Lwów; Siedlecki and Friedlein from Kraków. Approximately 200 watches were produced yearly.

After the dissolution, Patek established PATEK, PHILIPPE CIE with a new partner. Czapek founded CZAPEK & CIE also with a new partner, Juliusz Gruzewski.

== Czapek & Cie. ==
In 1845 Francois Czapek founded CZAPEK & CIE with a new partner, Juliusz Gruzewski (1808–1865) a close friend of French Emperor Napoleon III (1808–1873). Czapek’s new company flourished. He became watchmaker to the Court of the Emperor Napoleon III ('Fournisseur de la cour - Purveyors to the Imperial Court") and had an Atelier in Geneva, a shop in Paris, Place Vendome 28 (established 1850), and another in Warsaw (established 1854). Czapek was the author of the first book on watchmaking ever published in the Polish language Remarks on the watchmaking for the use of the watchmakers and the public (Słów kilka o Zegarmistrzowstwie ku użytku zegarmistrzów i publiczności). The work was printed in 1850 in Leipzig.

In early 1860s Czapek participated in January Uprising.

For unknown reasons, the company supposedly changed hands around 1869, possibly the illness or death of Czapek. Czapek's date of death is unknown. However a stem-winding pocket calendar watch (illustrated) contains a French inscription on the case inside translating as "Former Establishment Czapek and Company / No. 10630 / A. Chaillet Successor / 84 Rue du 4 Septembre / Paris". In another area it is inscribed "1876 / Rudzicki". This indicates the business continued for some period after Czapek's departure.

The street was renamed "Rue du Quatre Septembre" by order of the mayor of Paris on 12 September 1870, in honor of 4 September 1870, the day of the proclamation of the Third Republic. That also was when Napoleon III was captured by the Prussians and sent to England in exile (where he died in 1873). The continuation of the Franco-Prussian war for another five months before the defeat of France, the loss of their patron and the onset of the new government possibly were factors in the transfer of Czapek et Cie to Chaillet.

In 2011 CZAPEK & CIE was revived in Basel and moved in 2014 to Neuchatel, Switzerland.

== Historic watch gallery ==
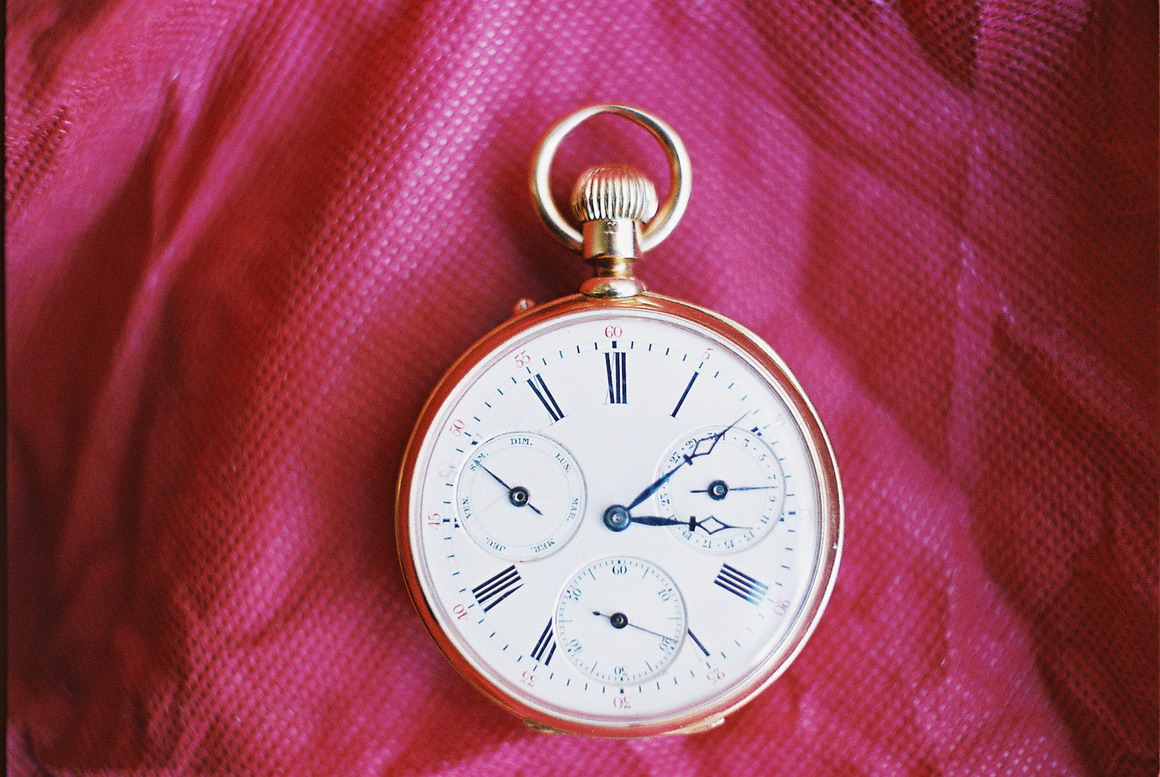
An open-face pocket watch Czapek & Cie., 18 karat gold

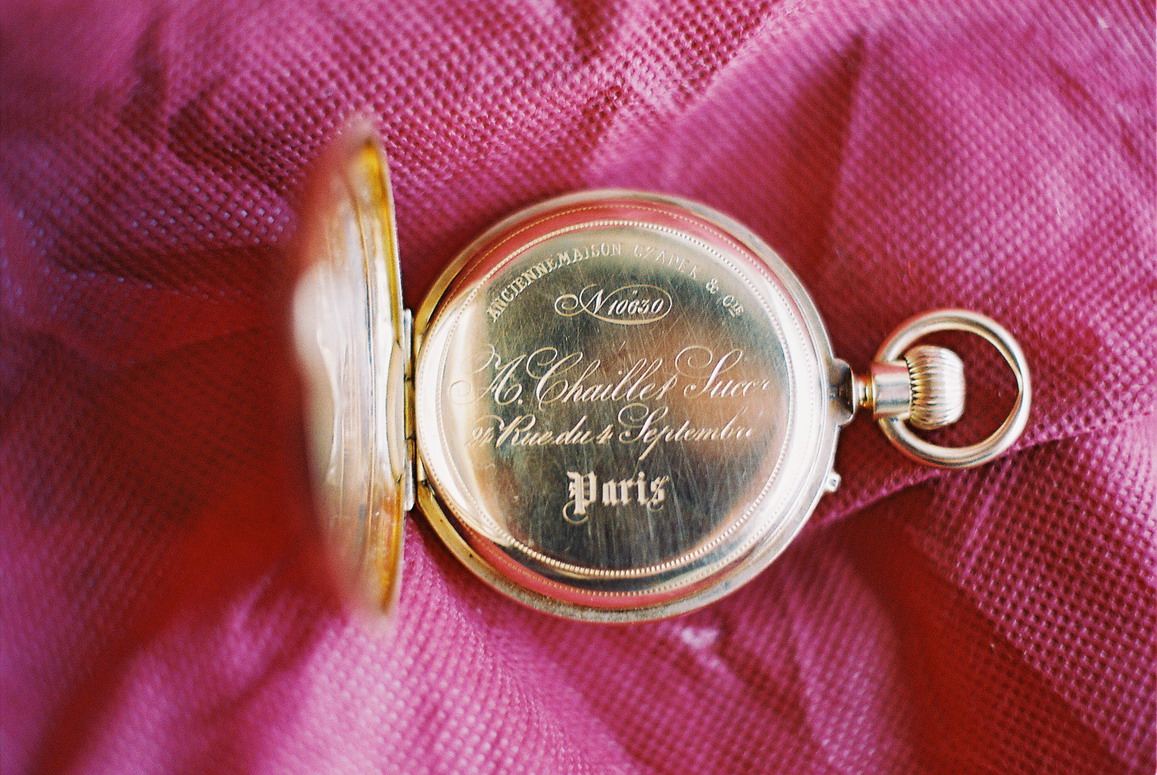
Back cover open, movement cover with engraved name of the watchmaker, serial No.10630, and (probably) the name of the store for which it was made.

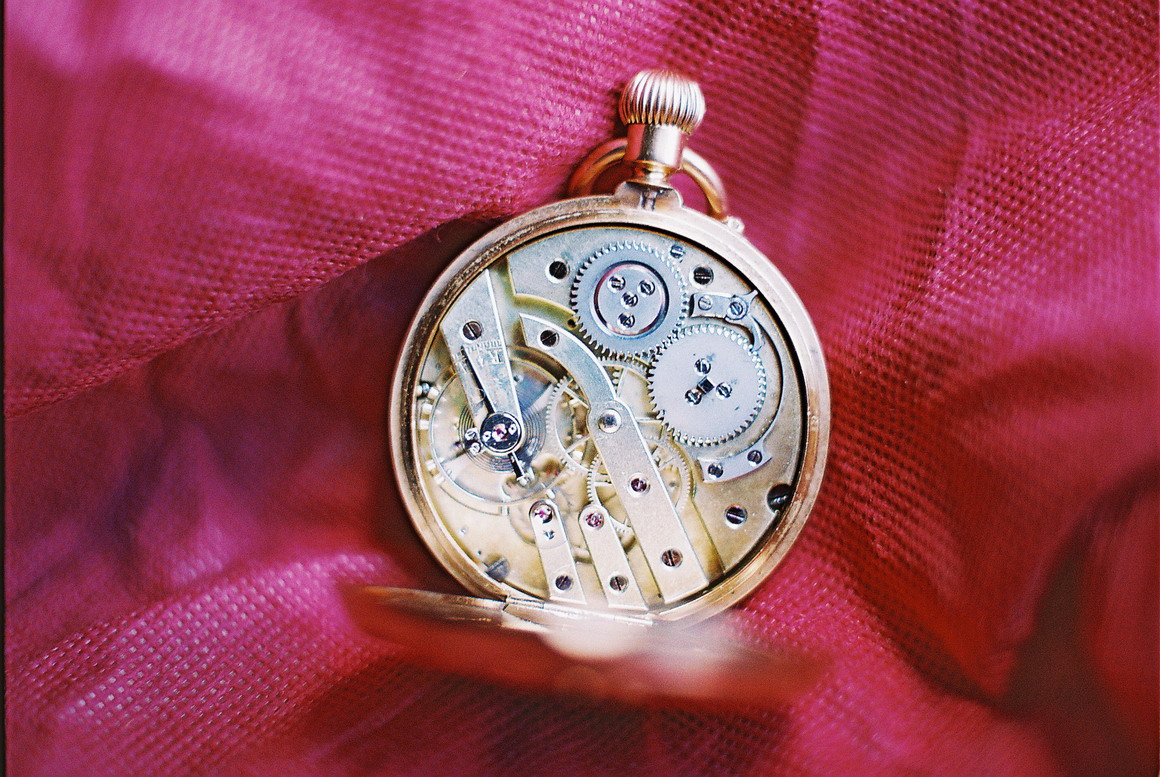
Watch movement

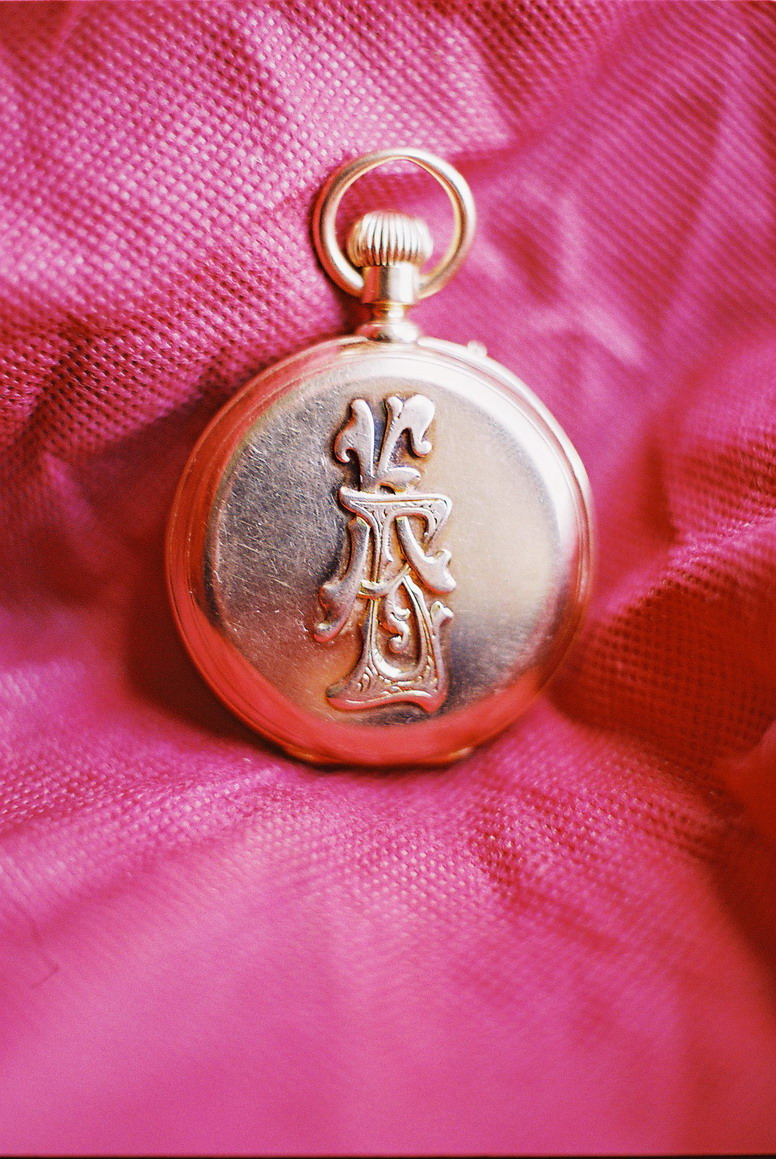
Back cover with insignia
