= Patek Philippe =

Swiss luxury watch and clock manufacturer

Patek Philippe SA
- Type: Private (Société Anonyme)
- Industry: Watchmaking
- Founded: 1839; 187 years ago in Geneva (as Patek, Czapek & Cie); 1845 (as Patek & Cie); 1851 (as Patek, Philippe & Cie)
- Founders: Antoni Patek; Franciszek Czapek; Adrien Philippe
- Headquarters: Plan-les-Ouates, Canton of Geneva, Switzerland; 46.16629°N 6.11211°E
- Area served: Worldwide
- Key people: Thierry Stern, President; Laurent Bernasconi, CEO
- Products: Mechanical watches, clocks
- Production output: 70,000 (2023)
- Revenue: US$2.05 billion (2023)
- Owner: Stern family of Switzerland
- Subsidiaries: The Henri Stern Watch Agency Inc.; Patek Philippe Salon Ltd; Patek Philippe France
- Website: www.patek.com

Patek Philippe SA (French: [paˈtɛk fiˈlip]) is a Swiss luxury watchmaker and clock manufacturer located in the Canton of Geneva and the Vallée de Joux. Established in 1839, it is named after two of its founders, Antoni Patek and Adrien Philippe. Since 1932, the company has been owned by the Stern family in Switzerland and remains the last family-owned independent watch manufacturer in Geneva. Patek Philippe is one of the oldest watch manufacturers in the world with an uninterrupted watchmaking history since its founding. It designs and manufactures timepieces as well as movements, including some of the most complicated mechanical watches. The company maintains over 400 retail locations globally and over a dozen distribution centers across Asia, Europe, North America, and Oceania. In 2001, it opened the Patek Philippe Museum in Geneva.

Patek Philippe is widely considered to be one of the most prestigious watch manufacturers in the world. As of July 2023, among the world's top ten most expensive watches ever sold at auctions, nine were Patek Philippe watches. In particular, Patek Philippe Grandmaster Chime Ref. 6300A-010 currently holds the title of the most expensive watch (and wristwatch) ever sold at auction (US$31 million/27 million CHF), while the Patek Philippe Henry Graves Supercomplication, the world's most complicated mechanical watch until 1989, currently holds the title of the most expensive pocket watch ever sold at auction (US$24 million/21 million CHF).

== History ==
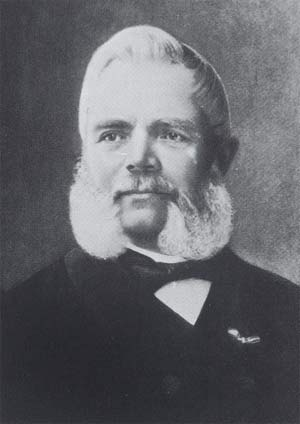
Antoni Patek

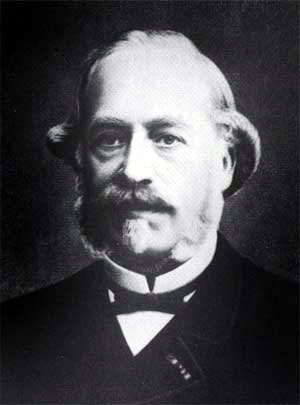
Adrien Philippe

=== Early history ===
The company traces its origins to the mid-19th century, when Polish watchmaker Antoni Patek and his Czech-born Polish business partner Franciszek Czapek formed Patek, Czapek & Cie in Geneva on 1 May 1839 and started manufacturing pocket watches. The two eventually separated due to disagreements, and the company was liquidated on 18 April 1845. At that point, Czapek founded Czapek & Cie on 1 May 1845 with a new partner, Juliusz Gruzewski. Subsequently, Patek was joined by French watchmaker Adrien Philippe, the inventor of the keyless winding mechanism (although this had been discovered previously by Abraham Louis Breguet but not patented by him), and continued the watchmaking business with a new company, Patek & Cie, beginning on 15 May 1845.

On 1 January 1851, the company's name was officially changed to Patek, Philippe & Cie. In the same year, Queen Victoria of the United Kingdom acquired a keyless pendant watch at the Great Exhibition in London. The watch was embellished with rose-cut diamonds set in the pattern of a bouquet of flowers. The Queen had another exclusive Patek Philippe timepiece, to be worn pinned to clothing. This watch was suspended from a diamond and enamel brooch. In 1868, Patek Philippe created the first Swiss wristwatch for Countess Koscowicz of Hungary.

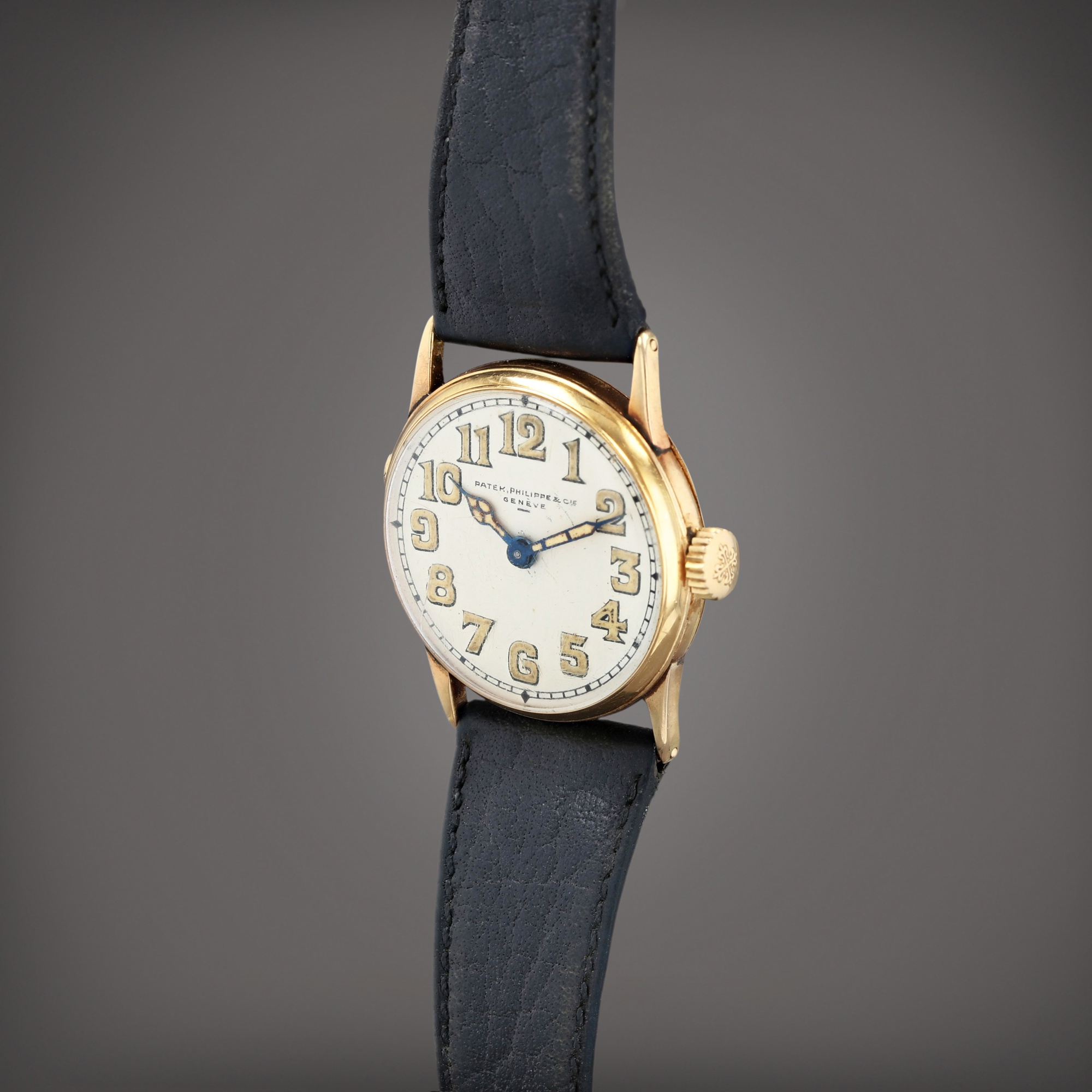
The highly historic Patek Philippe known as “The Watchmaker’s Daughter”. It was first owned by the Patek Philippe founder, Adrien Philippe, and is the only wristwatch owned by one of the company’s founders. He later gifted it to his daughter on her wedding day in 1875. The current whereabouts of this watch are unknown, but rumored to have been purchased by the Patek Philippe Museum due to its historical importance and provenance. (Note: Originally the watch was ordered and owned by the founder, Adrien Philippe. Adrien gifted the watch to his daughter, Louise, as a gift for her wedding to Joseph Antoine Bénassy in 1875, which is noted as the marriage that saved Patek Philippe. A successor was desperately needed at the time for the company to survive the founding generation. Joseph would replace Antoni Patek running the company in 1877 upon his death. It is one of a kind as the only wristwatch owned by one of the founders of Patek Philippe. The watch is the earliest ancestor of the Calatrava possessing the profile and size that would become the standard for future wristwatches being slim with a round case, which would be later implemented in Reference 96. The watch was passed down internally by the descendants of Adrien Philippe for 148 years. Auctioned at Sotheby's in 2023.)

In 1875, Adrien Philippe commissioned a watch that he later gave to his daughter Louise as a wedding present, which is known as the only wristwatch to be owned by either Patek or Philippe. This historical watch is known as “The Watchmaker’s Daughter” and was auctioned in 2023 by the descendants of Adrien Philippe. The watch was purchased most probably by the Patek Philippe Museum though this is not confirmed and may be owned by a private collector. The wedding between Louise Philippe and Joseph Antoine Bénassy where the watch was presented is noted as the wedding that helped Patek Philippe survive the founding generation by providing the company with a successor to Antoni Patek.

In March 1877, Antoni Patek died at the age of 65, but his only son, Léon Mecyslas Vincent Patek, did not join the business. As a result, Joseph Antoine Bénassy-Philippe, one of Adrien Philippe's sons-in-law, succeeded to Antoni Patek's position. In 1887, the cross of one of the four Military Orders of Spain, the Order of Calatrava, became the registered company logo of Patek Philippe as a sympathetic allusion to the still-extant order of Catholic knights that fought the Muslims in the Crusades. In 1891, the 76-year-old Adrien Philippe handed over his position in the business to his youngest son, Joseph Emile Philippe, together with François Antoine Conty. Adrien Philippe died in January 1894.

=== Company restructuring ===
In year 1901 saw the transformation of Patek Philippe into a joint-stock company, Ancienne Manufacture d'horlogerie Patek, Philippe & Cie, Société Anonyme, initiated by J. A. Bénassy-Philippe and Joseph E. Philippe. Still being run as a family business, Patek Philippe then had seven shareholders, five of whom formed the board of directors with J. A. Bénassy-Philippe being the chairman. Joseph E. Philippe's son later joined the company, and he was the last offspring of the founders in the business. In 1915, Albert Einstein ordered a gold pocket watch from Patek Philippe; in that year, he completed his Theory of General Relativity.

=== Current ownership and leadership ===
Since 1932, the Stern family of Switzerland has owned Patek Philippe, when Charles Stern and Jean Stern acquired the company during the Great Depression. The Stern brothers' company, Fabrique de Cadrans Stern Frères, had been a business partner of Patek Philippe as its supplier of watch dials. In 1935, Patek Philippe was brought to American markets by New York-based Henri Stern Watch Agency, where it was sold as a sister brand alongside Universal Genève.

In 1958, Henri Stern, the son of Charles Stern, became the president of Patek Philippe. Alan Banbery, who previously designed Universal's "Compax" movements and worked as a horologist for London's Garrard & Co, would take on the position of Director of Sales in 1965 and later authored official reference books on vintage Patek Philippe pocket watches and chronographs.

In 1993, Philippe Stern, the son of Henri Stern, became the president. He initiated the publication of the twice-a-year Patek Philippe Magazine in 1996, which is reserved for the watch owners and has received contributions from various prominent writers including Nobel Laureates Gao Xingjian and José Saramago.

In 2009, Philippe Stern's son, Thierry Stern, took over the reins from his father. In 2010, the company produced 40,000 timepieces and, according to Thierry Stern, it produced 58,000 pieces in 2017. In 2018, the number went up to 62,000, and in order to maintain quality and exclusivity, Patek Philippe would only slowly increase the number of timepieces produced each year (by 1-3 percent per year) but with a ceiling. Currently, the company is an active member of the Federation of the Swiss Watch Industry FH.

There have been four presidents since the Stern family acquisition in 1932:

- Charles Stern (1932–1958)
- Henri Stern (1958–1993)
- Philippe Stern (1993–2009)
- Thierry Stern (2009–present)

== Motto and slogan ==
One of Patek Philippe's company slogans is "You never actually own a Patek Philippe. You merely look after it for the next generation." The slogan was introduced when the company launched its "Generations" campaign in 1996.

== Watch manufacturing ==
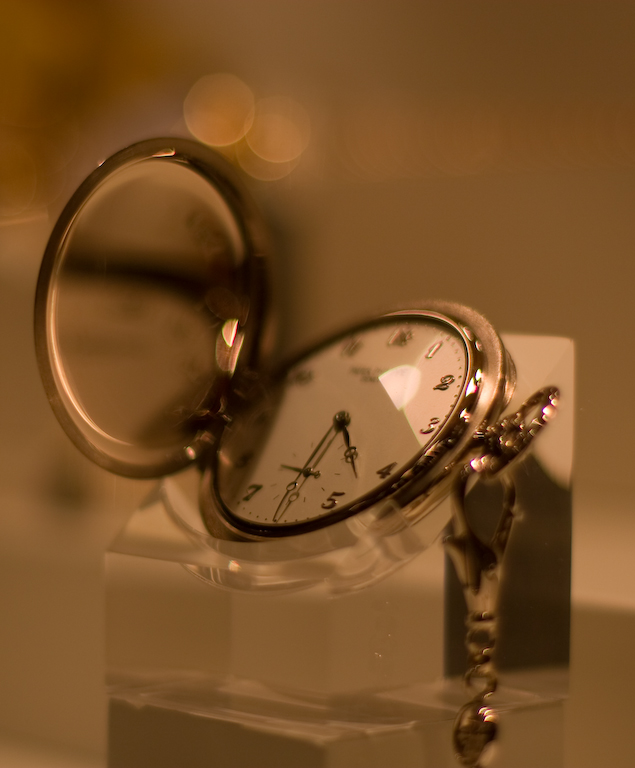
A pocket watch in the Patek Philippe collection of Tiffany & Co., an authorized retailer and close business partner of Patek Philippe

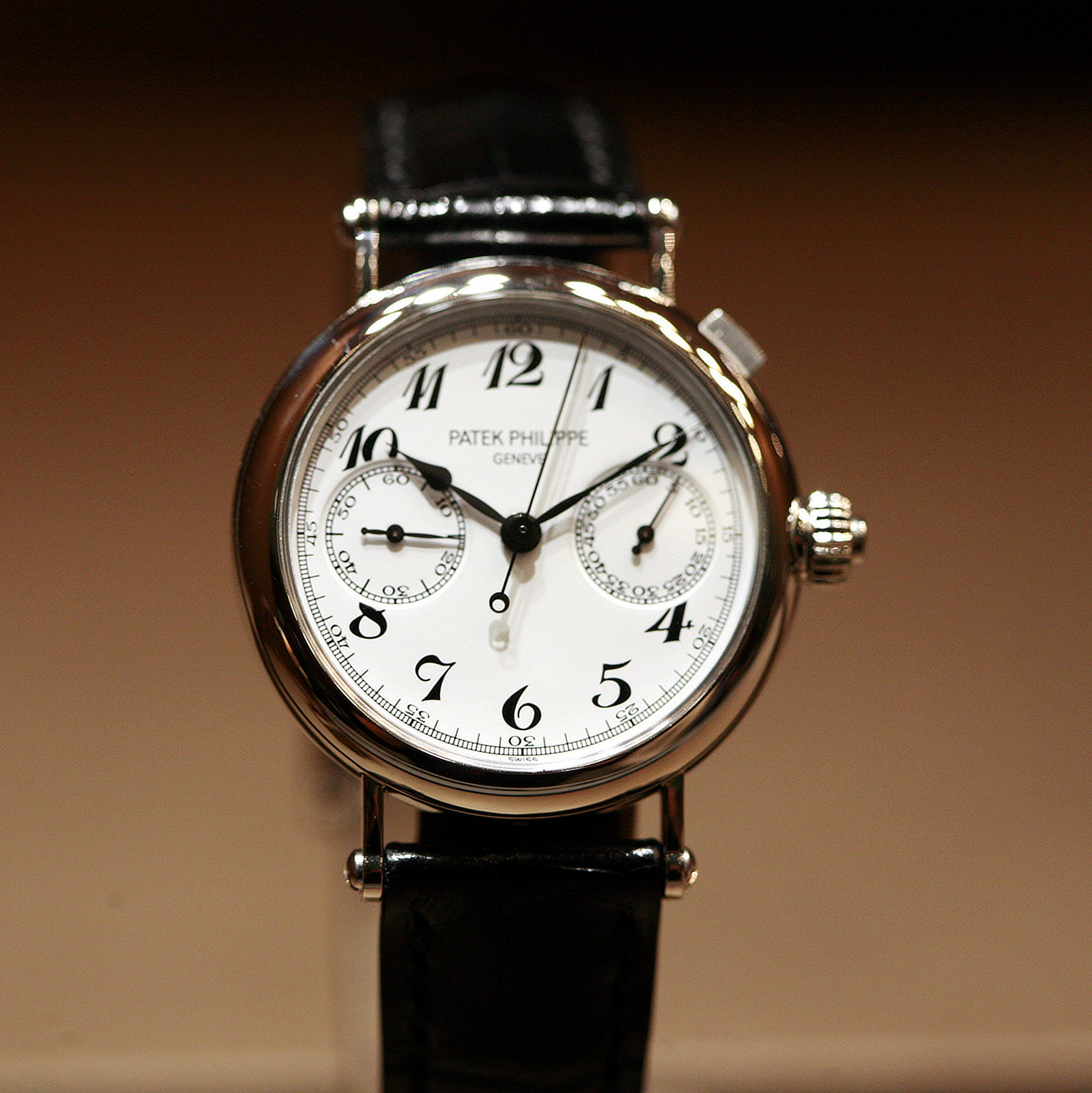
A Patek Philippe chronograph wristwatch

Patek Philippe manufactures its own watch components. Like other Swiss manufacturers, the company produces mostly mechanical movements with automatic or manual winding mechanism, but has also been producing quartz watches. In fact, Patek Philippe was one of the twenty Swiss watch companies that founded the Centre Electronique Horloger and collaboratively developed the first Swiss quartz movements, such as the Beta 21 movement (1969) which was used by several manufacturers in their watches. In the 1950s, the company even produced a prototype for a mechanical digital wristwatch, Ref. 3414.

Patek Philippe popularized complications such as perpetual calendar, split-seconds hand, chronograph, and minute repeater in mechanical watches. In 2009, the company announced that all of its future mechanical timepieces would be imprinted with the Patek Philippe Seal which requires a precision of -3/+2 seconds per day for diameters no less than 20mm and -5/+4 seconds per day for diameters less than 20mm, surpassing the highest industry standard of watch manufacturing and thus abandoning the Geneva Seal.

In December 2018, World Wide Fund for Nature (WWF) released a report assigning environmental ratings for 15 major watch manufacturers and jewelers in Switzerland. Patek Philippe was given the lowest environmental rating as "Latecomers/Non-transparent", suggesting the manufacturer has taken few actions addressing the impact of its manufacturing activities on the environment and climate change.

=== Notable inventions and patents ===
Patek Philippe has invented over 20 basic calibres and has received over 100 patents. The following are some of the important contributions from Patek Philippe to the watchmaking industry.

- In 1845, patented keyless winding and hand-setting system, which received a bronze medal at the 1844 Industrial Exposition in Paris.
- In 1868, created the first Swiss wristwatch.
- In 1881, patented its precision regulator.
- In 1889, patented perpetual calendar mechanism for pocket watches.
- In 1902, patented double chronograph.
- In 1916, produced the world's first lady’s wristwatch with complication (No. 174 603, a five-minute repeater).
- In 1923, launched the world's first split-second chronograph wristwatch (No. 124 8244).
- In 1925, created the world's first perpetual calendar wristwatch (No. 97 975), with a compact movement for pendant watches created in 1898.
- In 1933, created the Henry Graves Supercomplication, the most complicated mechanical watch in the world (24 complications) until 1989.
- In 1941, launched the first serially produced perpetual calendar chronograph the Ref. 1518
- In 1949, patented the Gyromax balance.
- In 1956, created the world's first all-electronic clock which, in 1958, received the "Award for Miniaturization” in New York.
- In 1962, a tourbillon movement achieved the world's still-unbeaten timekeeping precision record for mechanical watches at Geneva Observatory.
- In 1986, patented the secular perpetual calendar with retrograde date indication.
- In 1989, created the Calibre 89, the most complicated mechanical watch in the world (33 complications) until 2015.
- In 1996, patented annual calendar mechanism and introduced the first annual calendar model Ref. 5035.
- In 2003/05, launched the annual calendar Ref. 5250, being the world's first watch with silicon-based (the Silinvar alloy) escapement wheel.
- In 2006, introduced the silicon-based Spiromax balance spring.
- In 2008, introduced the Pulsomax silicon-based escapement.
- In 2011, introduced the Oscillomax ensemble, combining the Spiromax balance spring, the Pulsomax escapement, and the GyromaxSi balance.
- In 2014, created the Grandmaster Chime Ref. 5175, one of the world's most complicated wristwatches (20 complications).

== Notable models ==
=== Most expensive pieces ===
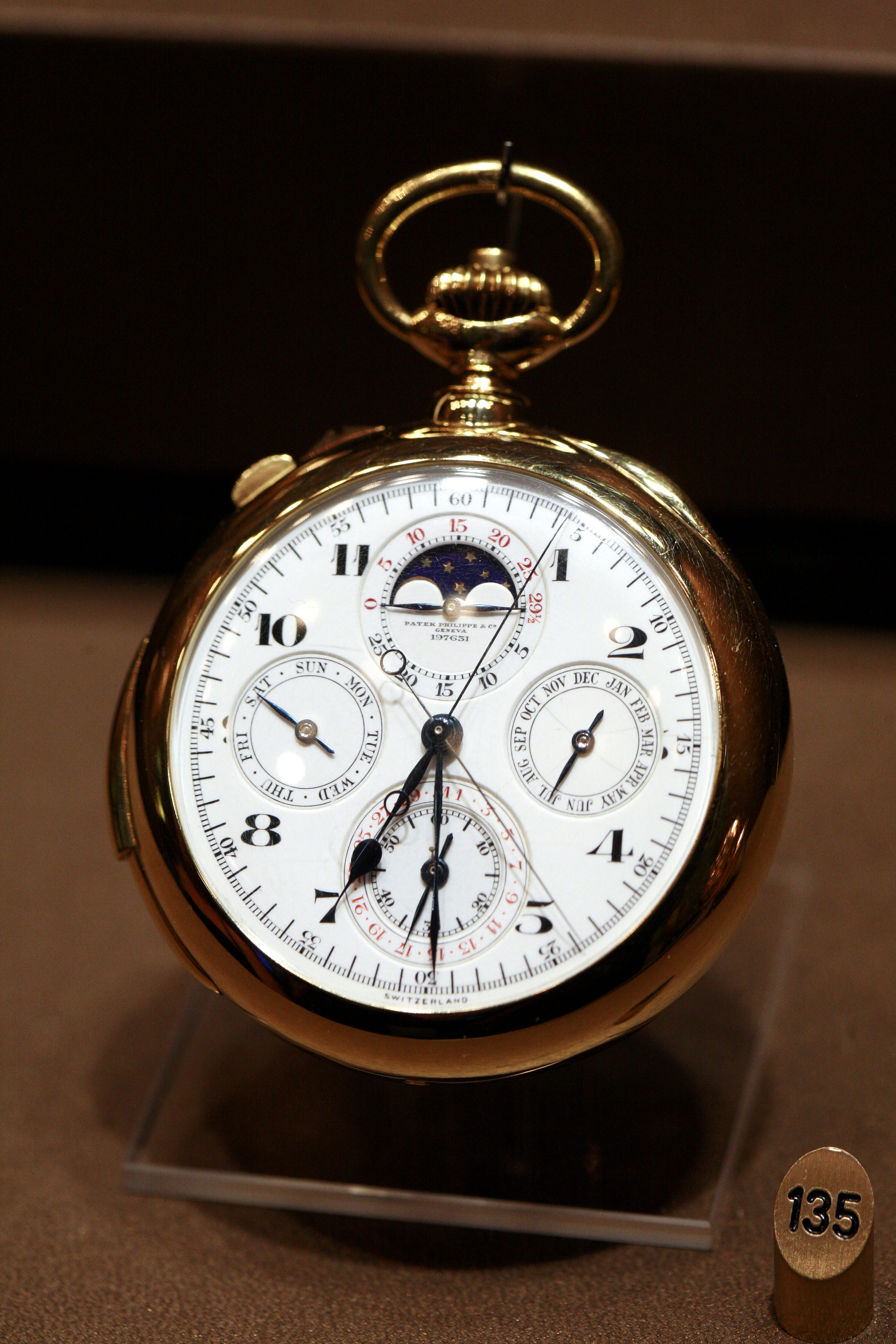
A Patek Philippe pocket watch

Patek Philippe timepieces have repeatedly fetched high prices in auctions worldwide. As of 2023, among the world's top ten most expensive watches ever sold at auctions, nine were Patek Philippe watches. Among the top 58 most expensive watches sold at auction (over 2 million US dollars), 46 are Patek Philippe watches. A small part of the demand for auction pieces is driven by Patek Philippe themselves, as they are purchasing in the auction market to add to the collection of the Patek Philippe Museum in Geneva.

- On November 28, 2012, the Patek Philippe Star Calibre 2000 Ref. 990/1 was sold at Christie's in Hong Kong for a final price of US$3.28 million (HKD 25,300,000), becoming the most expensive timepiece ever auctioned in Asia at the time. The timepiece boasts 21 complications, including Westminster Chimes, minute repeating, lunar orbit and so on, and was made in 2008.
- On November 11, 2014, the Henry Graves Supercomplication was sold at Sotheby's Geneva Auction for a record-breaking US$23.98 million (CHF 23,237,000), becoming the most expensive watch ever sold at auction and held the title until November 9, 2019. The Supercomplication was made in 1933 for the prominent banker Henry Graves Jr. The ultra-complicated pocket watch (having 24 complications) was the result of Graves' friendly horological competition with James Ward Packard. After Graves' death, the watch was held by his daughter, and then by his grandson until 1969, when it was sold to Seth G. Atwood who kept the watch in his renowned "Time Museum" in Rockford, Illinois until 1999. The watch was auctioned for the first time at Sotheby's in December 1999 for a record-breaking US$11 million to Sheikh Saud Bin Mohammed Bin Ali Al-Thani of the Qatari royal family.
- On November 12, 2016, a Patek Philippe Ref. 1518 in steel took the title as the most expensive wristwatch ever sold at auction (until October 2017). Sold through Phillips' Geneva auction house, the watch fetched a final price of US$11.14 million (CHF 11,002,000). This was the first time that a steel-case Ref. 1518 (only four were made in steel) went for auction; in fact, this piece was the first of the four steel Ref. 1518 manufactured, which features a chronograph and perpetual calendar.
- On November 9, 2019, Patek Philippe Grandmaster Chime Ref. 6300A-010 became the most expensive watch ever sold at auction, fetching US$31 million (CHF 31,000,000) in Christie's Geneva auction.
- On December 11, 2021, Patek Philippe Nautilus Ref. 5711 with Tiffany blue dial set a new world record for any wristwatch sold online, realizing US$6.5 million in Phillips New York auction.
- On April 25, 2022, a likely unique Patek Philippe Ref. 2499 – featuring a rare pink-gold case, and even rarer signature on its center subdial from Gobbi, the Milan watch dealer – sold at Sotheby's in Hong Kong for $7.68 million (HKD 60,265,000), setting a new record as the most expensive Ref. 2499 ever sold at auction.
- Over the weekend of November 9–10, 2025, a Patek Philippe Perpetual Calendar Chronograph Reference 1518, made in 1943, one of only four known to have been made in stainless steel, was sold for 14.19 million Swiss francs. It had once held the title for most expensive wristwatch ever sold at auction for 11 million Swiss francs in 2016.

=== Calatrava wristwatch ===
In 1932, Patek Philippe launched the first Calatrava model Ref. 96, which was designed by English horologist David Penney who was influenced by the Bauhaus art movement in Germany. Originally, the Stern brothers, soon after they acquired Patek Philippe in 1932, introduced the Calatrava to help the company pass through the Great Depression smoothly.

The original Calatrava Ref. 96 was in production for more than 40 years, and its successor models include Ref. 2526, Ref. 3520, Ref. 5196 and so on. Known for its simple and elegant design, the Calatrava wristwatch has been a flagship model of Patek Philippe since its introduction. Notably, the Calatrava Cross has been company's logo since 1887.

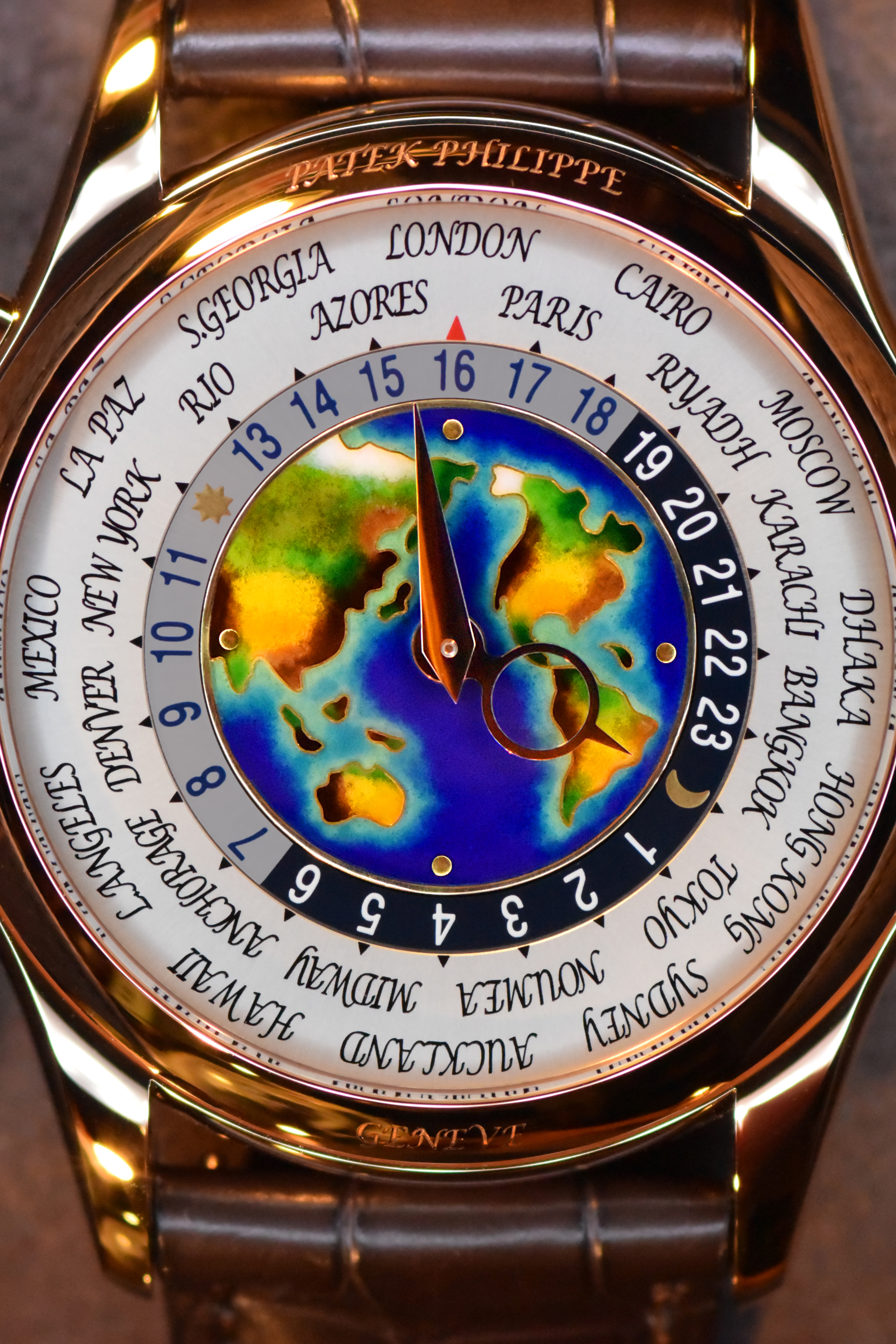
Patek Philippe 5131R-011 World Time wristwatch

=== World Time wristwatch ===
Patek Philippe World Time (Heures Universelles) collection was introduced in 1939, with Ref.1415 being the first model. The "World Time" complication is able to show the time for all 24 time zones on the same watch and was invented by Swiss watchmaker Louis Cottier in 1931. Cottier's invention attracted several watchmaking companies, while Patek Philippe was the first company to introduce a series of World Time wristwatches after forging a partnership with Mr. Cottier. The successors to Ref. 1415 include Ref. 2523, Ref. 5230, Ref. 5531 (with minute repeater), and so on.

As of 2018, Patek Philippe World Time collection (Ref. 1415, Ref. 2523) holds 6 spots among the 58 world's most expensive watches sold at auction (over 2 million US dollars), with the world record being 4.027 million US dollars (6,603,500 CHF) made at Antiquorum's Geneva auction on April 13, 2002.

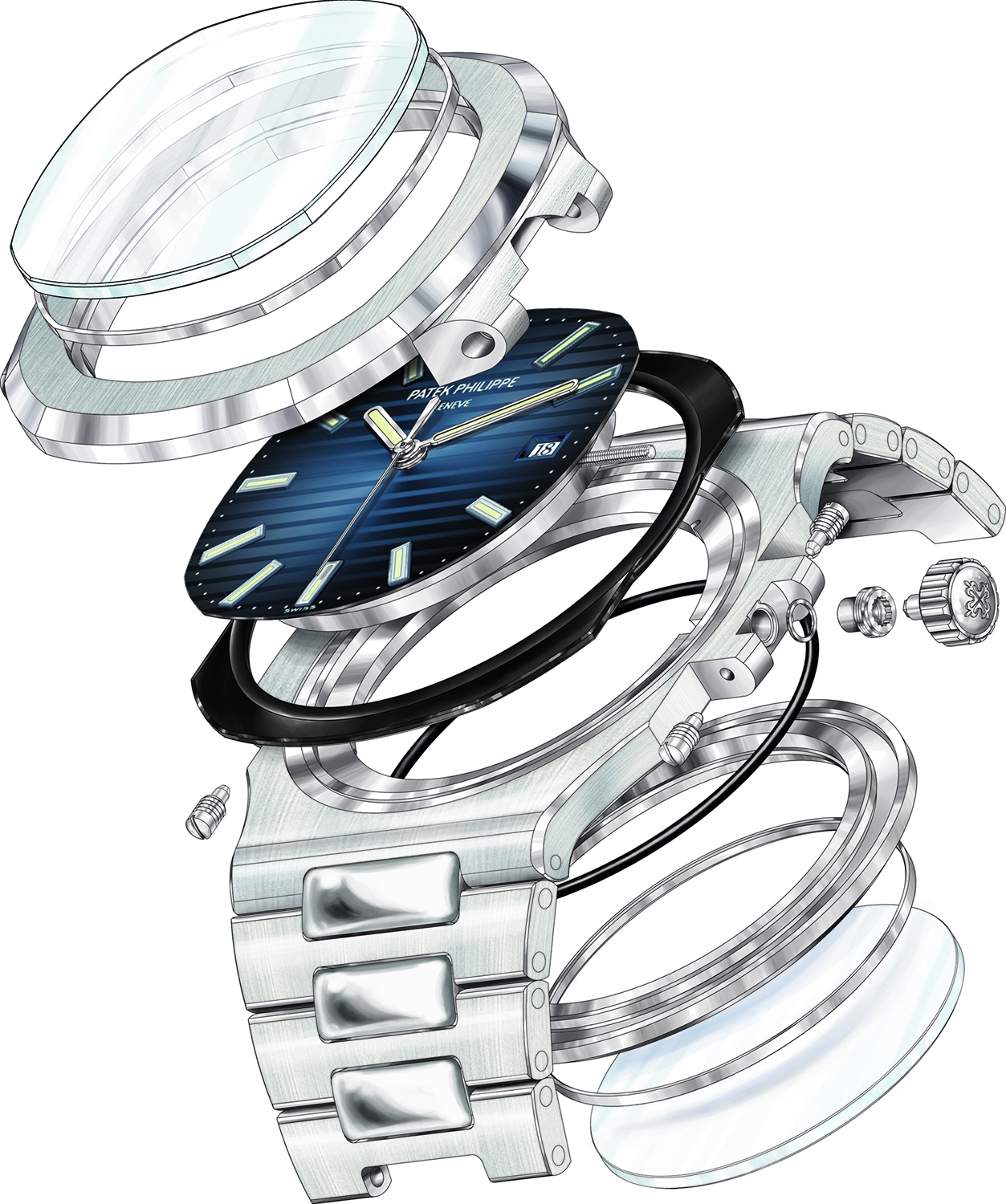
Diagram of the Nautilus

=== Nautilus wristwatch ===
In 1976, Patek Philippe introduced the Nautilus collection after deciding it was time to produce an exclusive sport watch with finishes of the highest quality. The first model was Ref. 3700 and was made of steel. It was designed by Swiss watchmaker Gérald Genta, who previously designed the Royal Oak collection for Audemars Piguet, and was released by Patek Philippe during the quartz crisis in the hope that it would help re-attract people's attention to high-end Swiss mechanical watches.

The Nautilus collection played a key role in Patek Philippe's overall marketing strategy as it had to refresh the brand image while perpetuating tradition. The target was represented by dynamic business managers of the new generations. The Nautilus wristwatch has become one of the most popular collections from Patek Philippe, and the Ref. 5711 & 5712 models, which the company introduced in 2006 to celebrate the 30th anniversary of the collection, are among the most popular models.

In 2018, Patek Philippe introduced the Reference 5740/1G, the first perpetual calendar watch in the Nautilus collection. The 5740 is widely considered one of the most important Nautilus watches ever released as it marks the most complex addition to the Nautilus line. The watch is made from 18K white gold and is powered by the calibre 240Q. The face of the Reference 5740, which measures 40 mm across, shows the month, day, date, leap year indicator, moon phase, and 24-hour cycle.

=== Perpetual calendar chronograph ===
Patek Philippe introduced the first serially produced perpetual calendar chronograph in 1941, with Ref. 1518 being the first model. The Ref. 1518 was in production from 1941-1954 with 281 pieces produced, mostly in yellow gold, approximately 55 pieces in rose gold and 4 pieces in steel. The Ref. 1518 is considered to be iconic and a masterpiece at 35mm in diameter with the original price in 1944 being 2,800 Swiss Francs. As Ben Clymer, founder of Hodinkee wrote in 2014 "...what the 1518 does have that no other Patek perpetual chronograph has to this day is a few examples in what many believe to be the ultimate metal for a Patek Philippe, and that's stainless steel." On November 8, 2025 in "Geneva, a stainless-steel Patek Philippe Ref. 1518 (case number 508'473, movement 863'193, widely believed to be the very first steel 1518 ever made) sold at Phillips for CHF 12 million (CHF 14.2 million or $17.6 million USD), making it the most expensive vintage Patek Philippe wristwatch ever sold at auction. The sale took place during Phillips (auctioneers) Geneva Watch Auction, held in association with Bacs & Russo, and marks a significant moment not only for Patek collecting, but for the broader watch market." This auction broke the prior record set on November 12, 2016, when a Ref. 1518 in steel became the most expensive wristwatch ever sold at auction (until October 2017), fetching a record-breaking US$11.14 million (11,002,000 CHF) in Geneva (through Phillips' auction house).

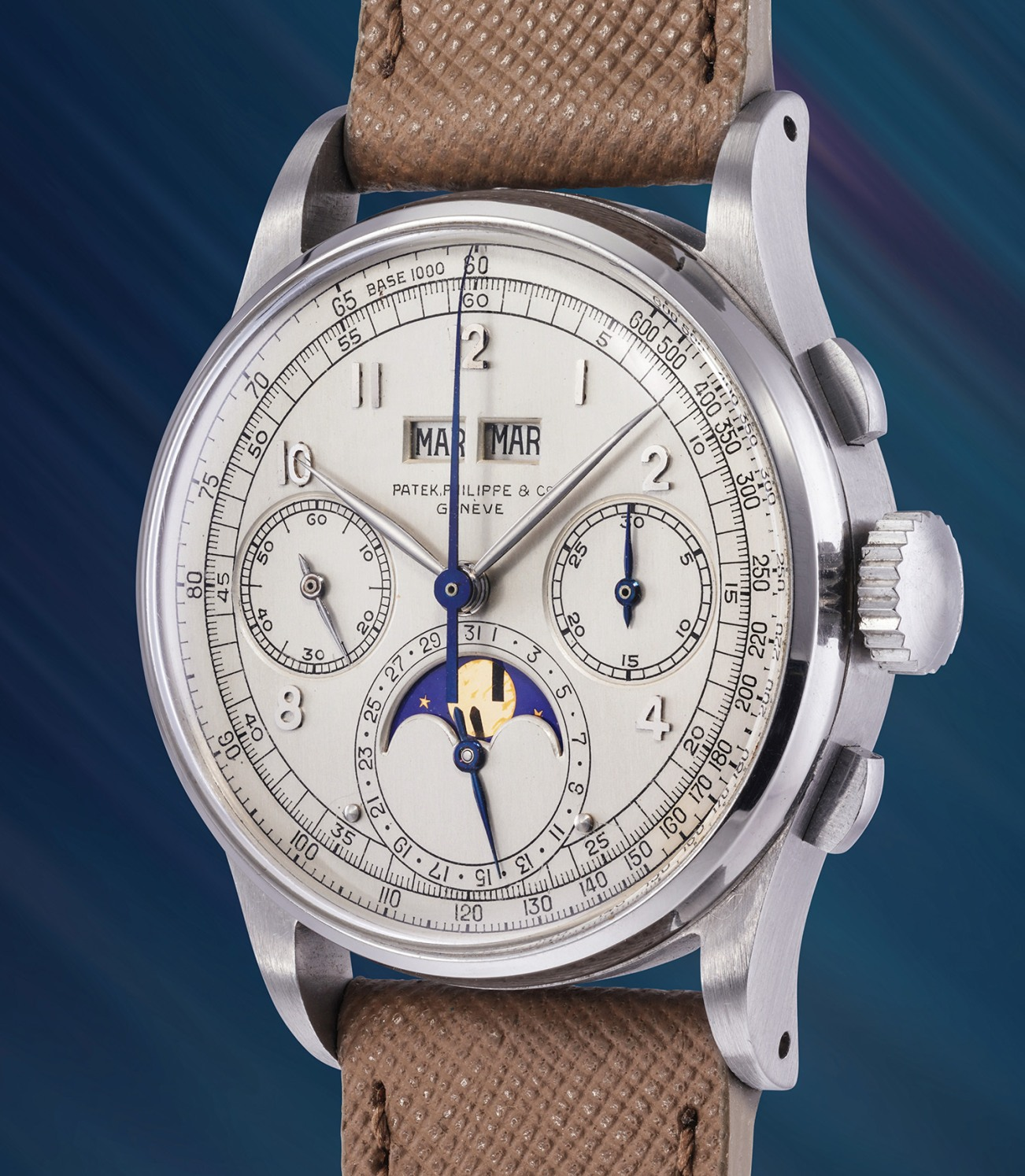
Patek Phillipe 1518 Steel Auctioned November 8, 2025 by Phillips

As the successor, Ref. 2499 is widely considered to be one of the greatest watch models in the world at 37.5mm in diameter. Historically, only 349 pieces of Ref. 2499 were made from 1950 to 1985 in yellow, white and rose gold with two pieces in platinum - around 9 pieces each year. Over the course of 35 years, four series of Ref. 2499 were introduced, exerting a strong influence on the watch designs of many other renowned watchmakers. As of June 2019, Ref. 2499 holds eleven spots among the 59 world's most expensive watches sold at auction (over 2 million US dollars) and at least 18 pieces of Ref. 2499 have been auctioned for more than 1.5 million US dollars, with the world record being 3.880 million US dollars (3,915,000 CHF) made at Sotheby's Geneva auction on November 13, 2018. The rare platinum 2499 was owned by Patek Philippe collector, Eric Clapton. While it was known within the watch collecting world that Clapton owned the watch, it came up for auction in November 2012 and sold for $3.63 million. The most famous Patek Ref 2499 was owned by The Beatles' John Lennon, an engraved piece gifted by Yoko Ono for his 40th birthday in 1980. The watch was stolen years ago but recently returned to her estate after a legal battle. The watch is now back in Yoko Ono's possession following a Swiss court ruling that the Italian buyer who found it at an auction was not the rightful owner.

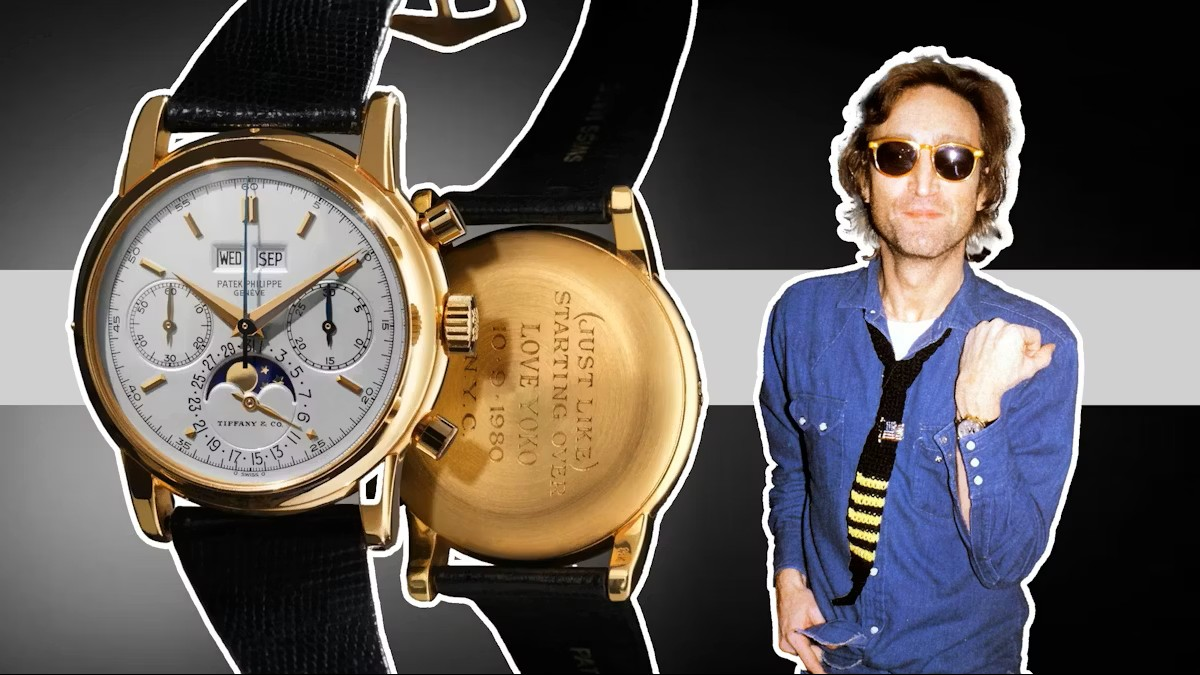
John Lennon Patek Phillipe 2499

The successors to Ref. 2499 include, in chronological order, Ref. 3970 (1985 - 2004, 4,200 produced in 3 series,36mm diameter), Ref. 5970 (2004 - 2010, 2,800 produced, 40 mm diameter) and Ref. 5270 (2011–present, 41mm diameter). The Ref. 5270 was the first Patek perpetual calendar chronograph to be powered by an in-house movement, the CH 29-535 PS Q.

=== Sky Moon Tourbillon ===
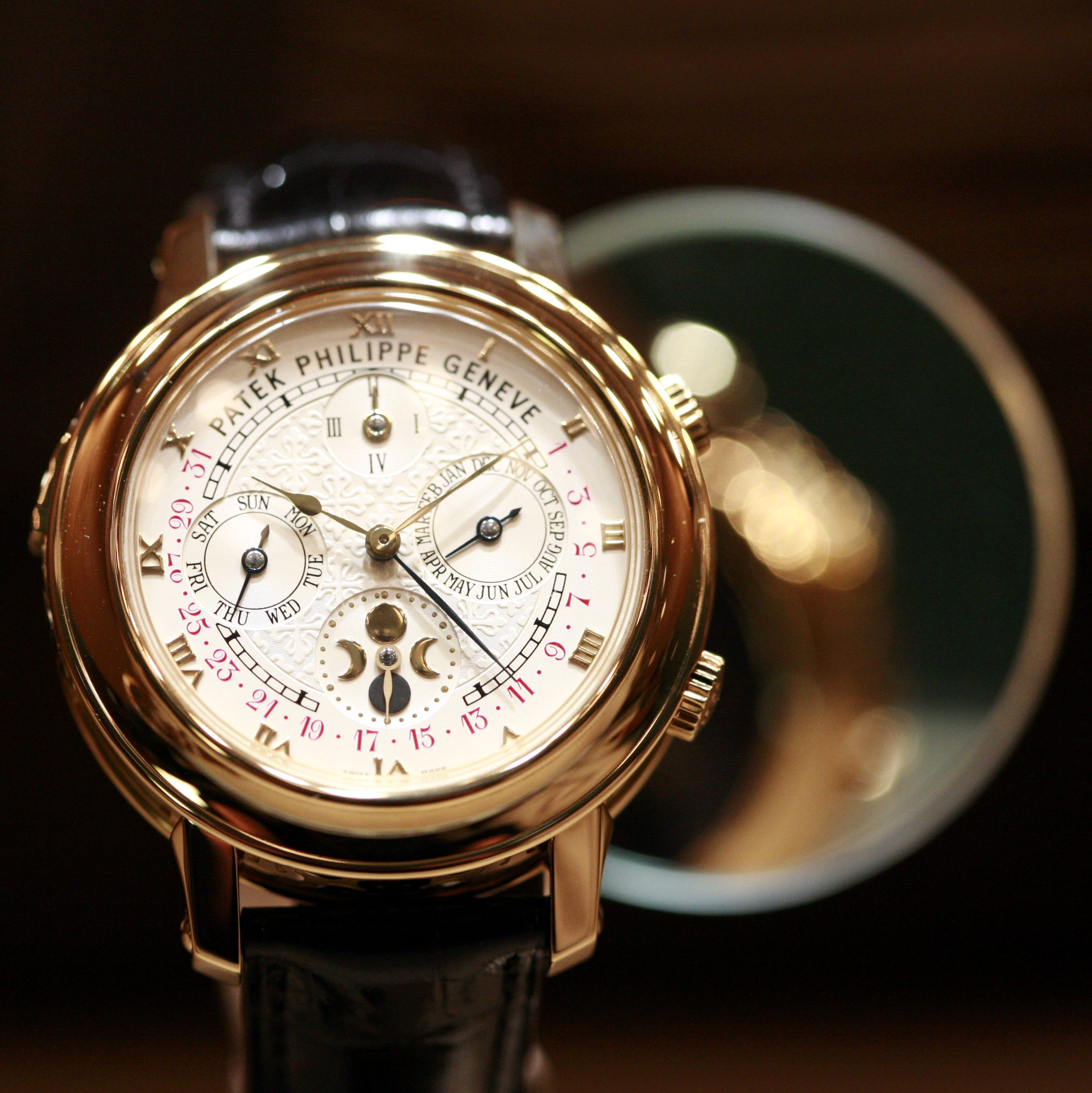
Patek Philippe Ref. 5002 Sky Moon Tourbillon

Patek Philippe Sky Moon Tourbillon wristwatch was introduced in 2001, with Ref. 5002 being the first model. The wristwatch has two dials and contains 12 complications including tourbillon, minute repeater, sky chart, and moon phase & orbit. In 2013, the company introduced the second model of Sky Moon Tourbillon, Ref. 6002, also with 12 complications. The new model took 7 years of research and development, while the engraving on each piece alone took more than 100 hours.

Sky Moon Tourbillon was the most complicated wristwatch from Patek Philippe until 2014. It is estimated that only 3 - 5 pieces are made each year, and the price for each piece is over US$1.2 million. However, every purchase of the piece requires an application from the buyer and has to be approved by Patek Philippe President Thierry Stern. On October 2, 2018, a Sky Moon Tourbillon 6002G was auctioned by Poly Auction in Hong Kong, fetching US$2.707 million (HKD 21,240,000), making it one of the most expensive watches ever sold in auction.

=== 150th anniversary edition ===
In 1989, Patek Philippe created Calibre 89, then the most complicated mechanical watch ever made, for its 150th anniversary. Calibre 89 holds 33 complications, including the date of Easter, time of sunrise, equation of time, sidereal time, and many other indicators. 1,728 unique parts allow sidereal time, a 2,800 star chart, and more. In addition, Calibre 89 is able to add a day to February for leap years while leaving out the extra day for every 100 year interval.

Only four pieces of Calibre 89 were ever manufactured by Patek Philippe, with one in white gold, one in yellow gold, one in rose gold, and one in platinum. The yellow-gold and the white-gold Calibre 89 were sold at auctions by Antiquorum in 2009 and 2004, respectively, and both watches currently rank among the top ten most expensive watches ever sold at auction, with final prices over 5 million US dollars.

=== 175th anniversary edition ===
In 2014, Patek Philippe introduced the Grandmaster Chime Ref. 5175, the most complicated wristwatch ever built by the manufacturer (with 20 complications, but no tourbillon), to celebrate its 175th anniversary. Only seven pieces of Ref. 5175 were created, with one permanently residing in the Patek Philippe Museum in Geneva. The sale price for each of the other six pieces was 2.5 million CHF (2.6 million US dollars).

In 2016, Patek Philippe introduced the Grandmaster Chime Ref. 6300, succeeding the Grandmaster Chime Ref. 5175. Ref. 6300 also has 20 complications, including grande sonnerie, minute repeater, and alarm with time strike (but without tourbillon), with the sale price over 2.2 million US dollars. The purchase of each piece requires an application from the buyer and has to be approved by Patek Philippe President Thierry Stern.

== See also ==
- Boule de Genève
- List of watch manufacturers
- Manufacture d'horlogerie
- Patek Philippe Calibre 89 – Commemorative pocket watch
- Patek Philippe Henry Graves Supercomplication – Former most complicated mechanical pocket watch
