= Pankey =

Origin
- Language: French (Panetier) West Slavic via German (Pahnke)
- Meaning: pantier: bread master, or keeper of the pantry pahnke: young master
- Region of origin: United States (by Anglicisation of European surname)

Other names
- Cognates: Panek, Pahnke, Pank
- See also: Junker, Juncker, Youngman, Jungmann

Pankey is an Americanized form of French Panetier: occupational name for a pantryman from panetieran agent derivative of pain ‘bread’. Alteration of the French ending -tier to English -key is typical for American French surnames. The American version originated with two French brothers who emigrated to Virginia in 1700, Jean and Etienne Panetier.

It is also a North American last name and the Anglicized form of the German-language surname Pahnke, which in itself is derived from the diminutive form pank/panek of the Lower Sorbian/Upper Sorbian/Polish word pan for "man", "master" or "mister" (and can thus roughly be translated as "little gentleman", “young noble” or "junker").

Notable people with the surname include:

- Ashton Pankey (born 1992), American basketball player
- Aubrey Pankey (1905–1971), American baritone
- Eric Pankey (born 1959), American poet and artist
- Irv Pankey (born 1958), American football player
- Susan Pedersen Pankey (born 1953), American swimmer
- Titus Pankey Jr. (1925–2003), American physicist
