= Junker (disambiguation) =

Junker may refer to:

- Junker, originally a noble honorific used across the German-speaking area.
- Junker (Prussia), a 19th and early 20th century term for the landed aristocracy of Prussia and Eastern Germany
- Junker (Russia), derived from the German term, has several meanings in Russian
- Junker FA (Junker Führeranwärter), a Waffen-SS officer candidate rank
- Junker (grape), another name for the wine grape Chasselas
- A decrepit car
- JUNKER, a police task force in the video game Snatcher
- Junker (surname)
- Junker Jørgensen (1946 – 1989), Danish cyclist

Junkers may refer to:

- Hugo Junkers, 1859–1935, German engineer
- Junkers, a company founded by Hugo Junkers, chiefly known for its later role in aircraft design and construction.
- Junkers-Chronographs
- Junkers, a faction in the video game Freelancer
- Junkers, brandname for boilers made by Robert Bosch GmbH

== See also ==
- Juncker
- Jonkheer
