= Junker (surname) =

Junker is a German surname. Notable people with the surname include:

- Bengt Junker, Swedish scouting leader
- Carl Junker
- Erwin Junker
- Gottfried Junker
- Hermann Junker, German egyptologist
- Howard Junker (born 1940), American writer and editor
- Karin Junker
- Karl Junker
- Kasper Junker, Danish footballer
- Leni Junker (1905–1997), German sprint runner
- Mads Junker, Danish football pundit and former footballer
- Renate Junker
- Sofya Junker-Kramskaya, Russian painter
- Steve Junker, American football player
- Steve Junker (ice hockey), Canadian former professional ice hockey player
- Wilhelm Junker, Russian explorer

== See also ==
- Juncker
- Hugo Junkers, 1859–1935, German engineer
- Junker Jørgensen
