= Young Man =

Young Man may refer to:

- Boy or young adult man

== Music ==
- Young Man (Billy Dean album) or the title song, 1990
- Young Man, an album by Jack Ingram, 2004
- "Young Man", a song by the Chicks from Gaslighter, 2020
- "Young Man", a song by Justin Timberlake from Man of the Woods, 2018
- "Young Man", a song by Living Colour from The Chair in the Doorway, 2009
- "Young Man", a song by Rodney Atkins from Caught Up in the Country, 2019

== Other uses ==
- The Young Man a 1984 novel by Botho Strauß
- Young Man of Arévalo (fl. 16th century), Spanish Morisco crypto-Muslim writer
- Young Man Kang (born 1966), South Korean filmmaker
- Young Man Lake, a lake in Montana, US
- Young Man (film), a 2022 Russian comedy film

== See also ==
- Naujawan (disambiguation) (lit. 'Young Man')
- Young Mans Butte, a mountain in North Dakota
- Young adult
- Youngman, a Chinese manufacturer of buses and trucks
- Youngman (MC), British MC
- Youngman (surname)
- Young Omni-Man, a fictional character in the Image Universe franchise Invincible
