= Louis Moinet =

French clockmaker and painter (1768–1853)

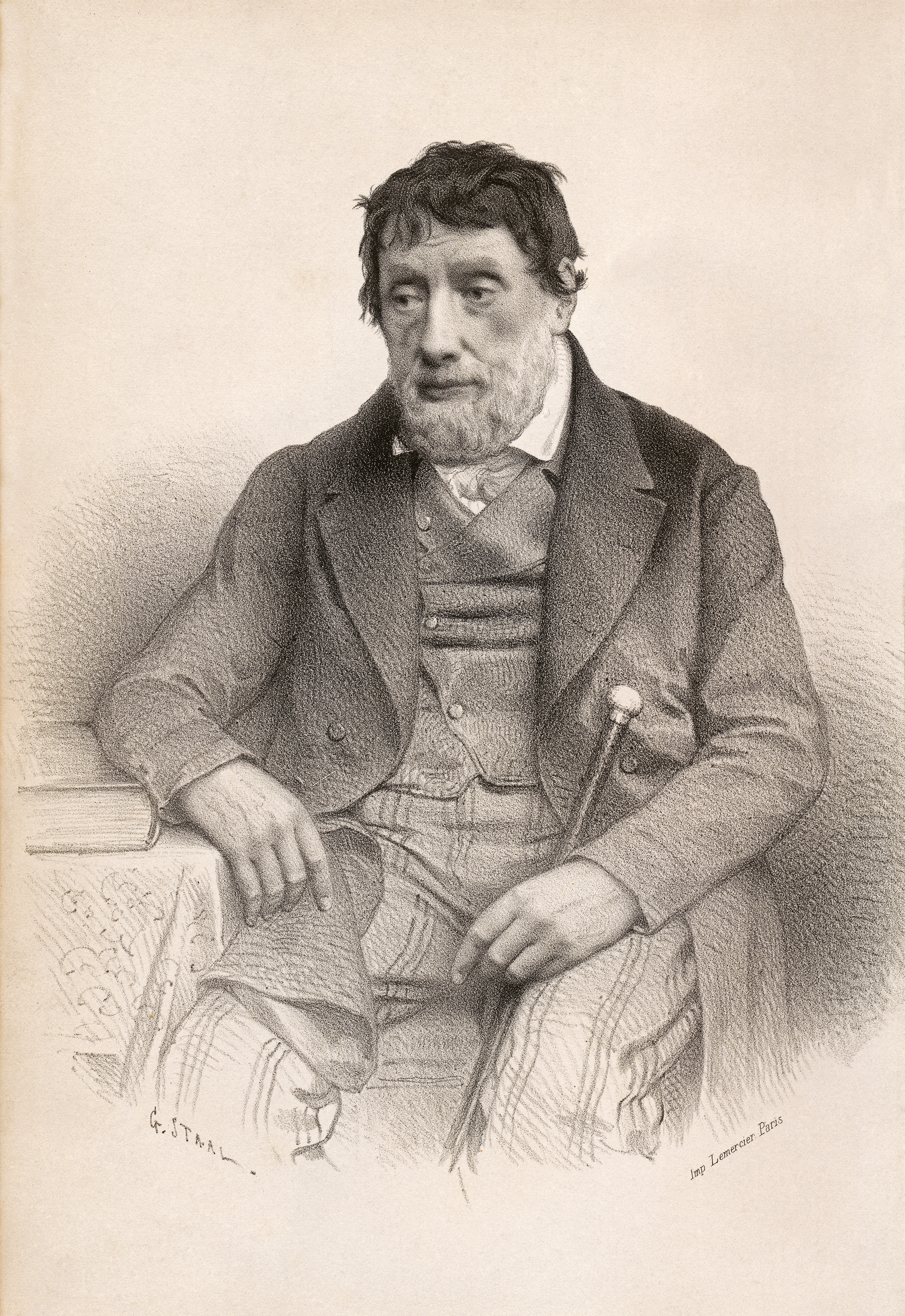
- Born: 1768; Bourges, France
- Died: 1853 (aged 84–85)
- Occupations: Horologist, Sculptor, Painter

Louis Moinet (1768–1853), inventor of the chronograph, was born into a prosperous family of farmers in Bourges, France, was a French horologist, sculptor and painter.

== History ==
During his studies, he quickly distinguished himself for his mastery of classical subjects, and he regularly took first place in academic competitions. While still a student, he was introduced to the world of watch making, and he spent almost all of his free time by the side of a master watchmaker. He was also privately tutored in drawing by an Italian painter.

At the age of twenty, Moinet hoped to move to Italy. Soon he left France for Rome, where he lived for five years studying architecture, sculpting, and painting. There he came into regular contact with members of the French Academy, which brought together the most illustrious artists of the time. From Rome, he went on to Florence to perfect the artistic skills he had acquired. As a painter, his legacy includes several fine works.

Upon his return to Paris, he was made a Professor of Fine Arts at the Louvre. At this time, he also began his theoretical and practical studies of watchmaking, an art which he already loved most passionately. He reestablished contact with his former master watchmaker and, within less than ten years, the master was to find himself in the position of student to Moinet. Watch making soon engrossed all of Moinet's time, and its tools brought him frequently to Switzerland where he spent extended periods of time.

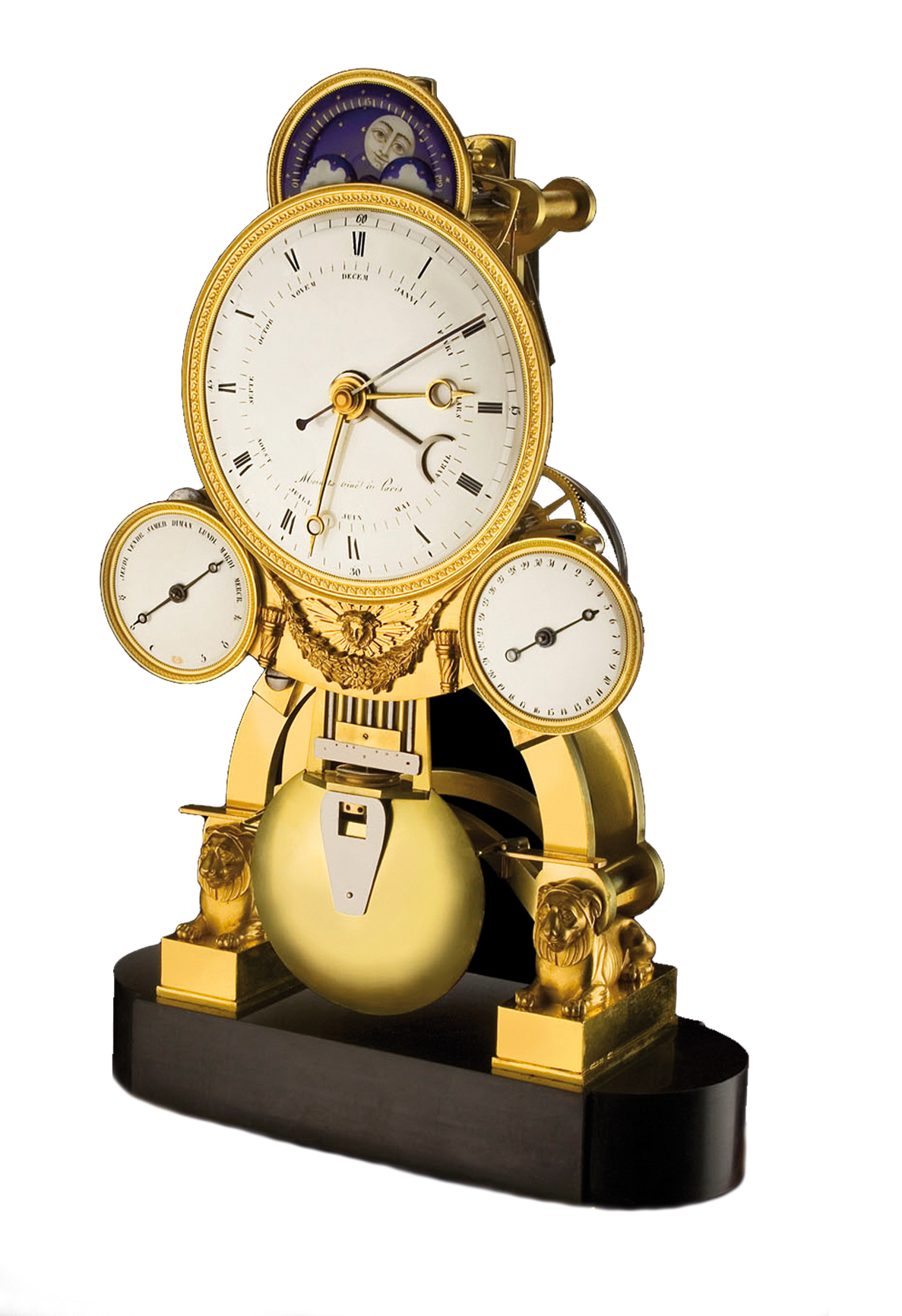
King of Naple's clock Louis Moinet, ca.1810

He became President of the Chronometry Society of Paris, and a member of a number of learned and artistic societies. When Moinet met Abraham-Louis Breguet, the latter was already quite famous. Breguet recognised Moinet's worth at once, and the two men worked closely together. From 1811 on, Moinet became Breguet's personal adviser.

Abraham-Louis Breguet's son, Antoine-Louis, found it difficult to tolerate the presence of a man who spent far more time with his father than he himself could. When Breguet died in 1823, Moinet left the house on the Quai de l'Horloge to live elsewhere.

Among his many technical accomplishments, Moinet re-made a Ferdinand Berthoud regulator almost in its entirety. He also invented a counter that, even today, is unequalled. The same can be said for another regulator and an astronomical watch. In terms of watchmaking techniques, Moinet was a genius and he improved upon many existing methods.

According to records from an exposition of industry products, a Mr. Francoeur "recognised the usefulness of a new balance-cock which helped with rewinding. The idea belonged to Moinet". Moinet undertook to share his extensive knowledge of watchmaking and, in 1848, he published the Traité d'Horlogerie. It is also an everlasting monument to Moinet, establishing his talent and reputation for the years to come.

He sacrificed everything to art: his time, his fortune and his health. He spent most of his life creating, imbuing materials with a life of their own.

== The work of Louis Moinet ==
=== Louis Moinet's clocks and customers ===
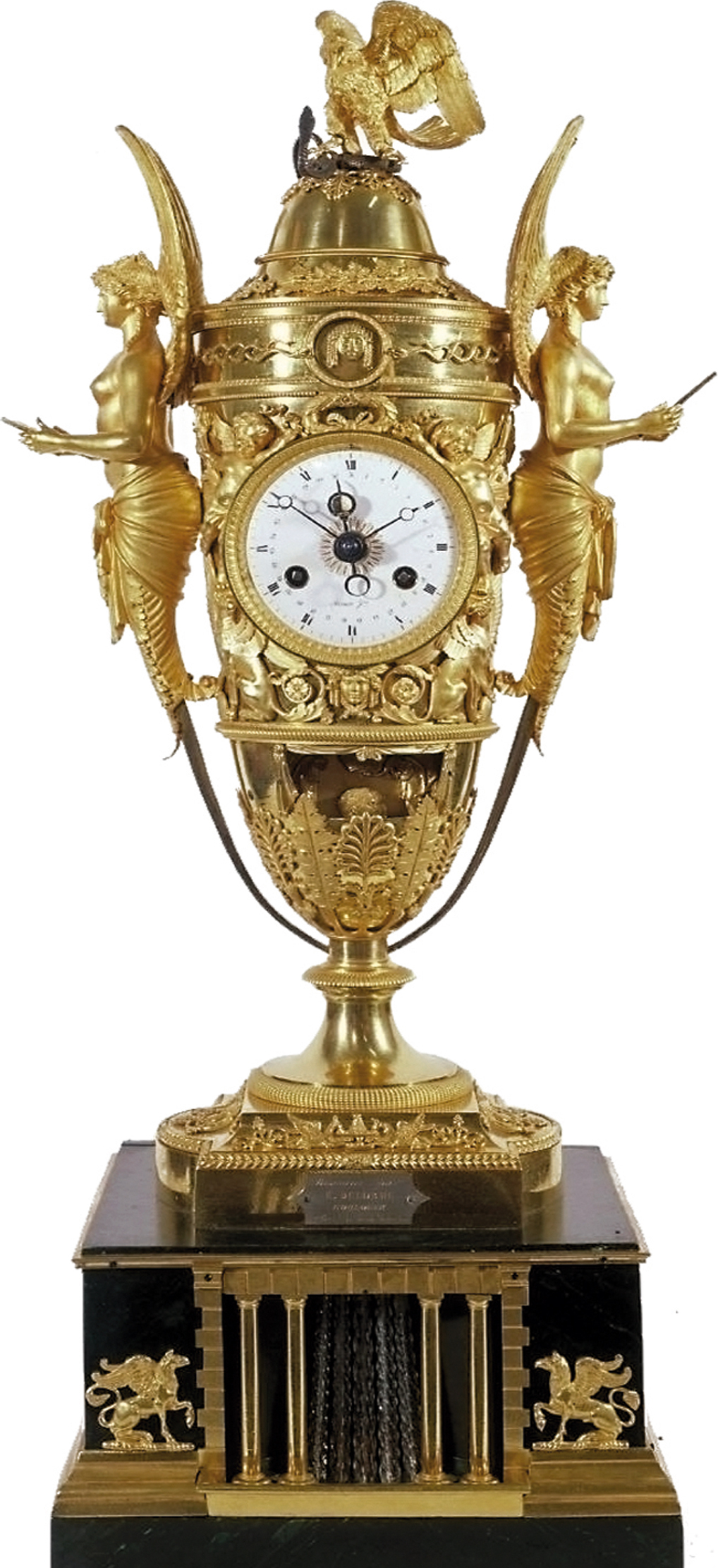
Napoleon's clock crafted in 1806 by Louis Moinet.

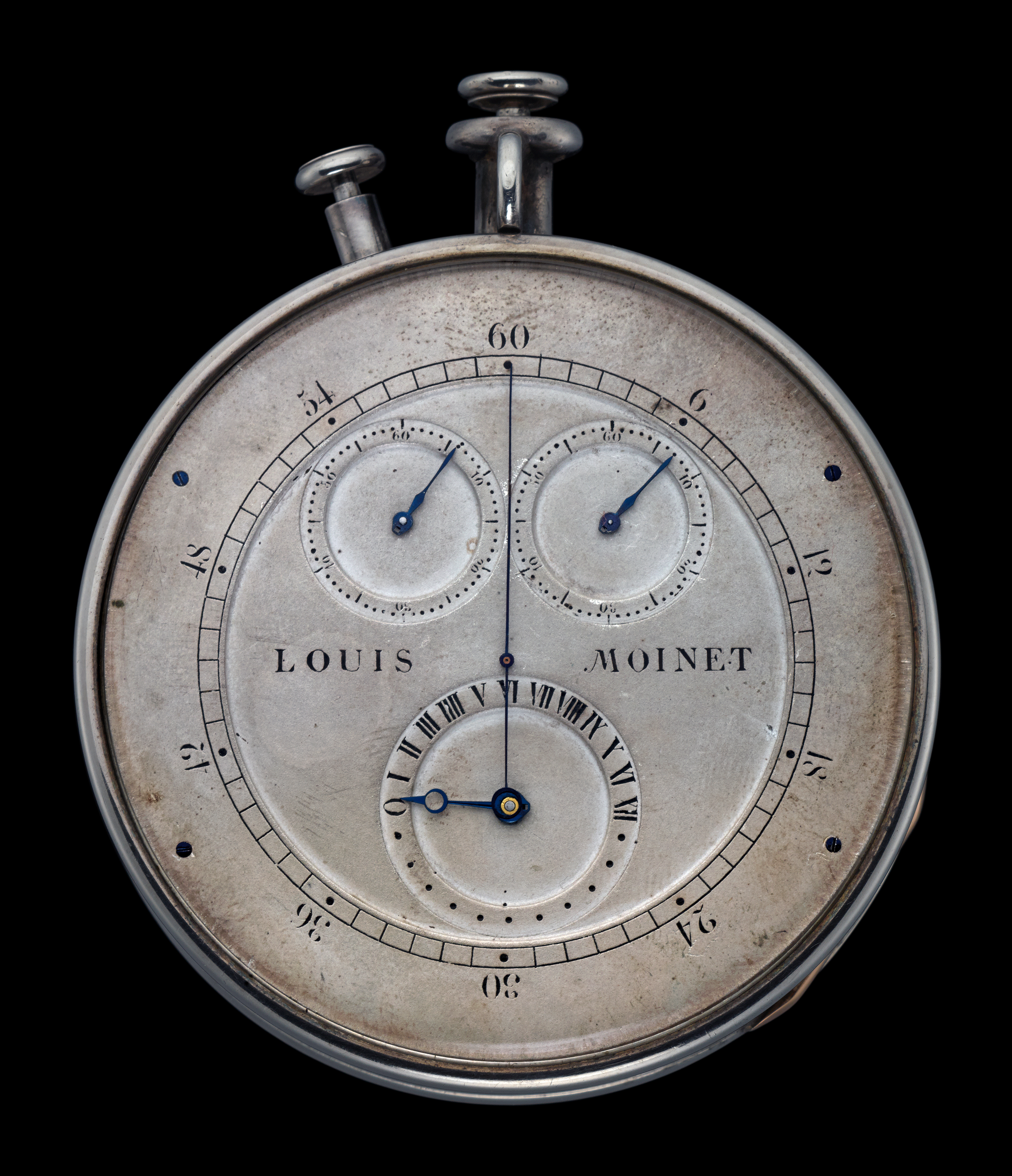
The first ever chronograph, although its maker, Louis Moinet, called it a “compteur de tierces.” According to hallmarks on the dust cover, the chronograph was started in 1815 and completed the following year.

Through the course of his career, Louis Moinet created clocks for prominent figures of his era such as Napoleon Bonaparte, Tsar Alexander I, President Thomas Jefferson, President James Monroe, King George IV, King of Naples Marshal Murat, Marshal Ney, and many crowned heads across Europe.

There are some extraordinary stories behind Louis Moinet's clocks, usually crafted in cooperation with the famous bronzier, Thomire:

- Napoleon Bonaparte: The "Napoleon Clock" was made in 1806 by Louis Moinet in Paris, and is equipped with an eight-day movement. It displays the hours, minutes and date but its great originality lies in an outstanding mechanism displaying the moon phases inside the day hand, by means of a tiny ivory ball.
- Thomas Jefferson: Signatory of the Declaration of Independence and also United States Ambassador in Paris, he became acquainted with Louis Moinet, and spelled out for the latter his three criteria for the creation of the work of art : beauty, durability and utility. One can well imagine that he really loved his clock, since it accompanied him during his two White House terms of office and indeed until his last breath.
- James Monroe: James Monroe’s clock is one of the original objects decorating the White House as it now stands. It was purchased in Paris in 1817 in order to adorn the White House that had been burned down by the English in 1814, and then rebuilt by architect James Hoban. A large proportion of the original furniture of the White House has been lost over the years, and only a handful of these witnesses to the past remain, including the famous “Minerva” clock by Moinet and Thomire.
- Ernst August: This bronze urn clock was crafted by Louis Moinet in 1810 and belonged to Ernst August, Prince of Hanover. Its technology with "Rotating circles" is particularly spectacular and enables to read the hours and minutes through two different cylinders located inside the urn.
- Marshal Murat: An exceptional clock of astonishing intricacy manufactured for Marshal Joachim Murat, King of Naples. The four different dials combine a full calendar indicating the hours, minutes, seconds, day, date, month and moon-phase. The movement is entirely visible from the back.

Moinet's clocks are considered works of art as well as fine timepieces and are currently on display in such important Museums as the Louvre in Paris, the Château de Versailles, and the Palazzo Pitti in Florence.

=== The inventions of Louis Moinet ===
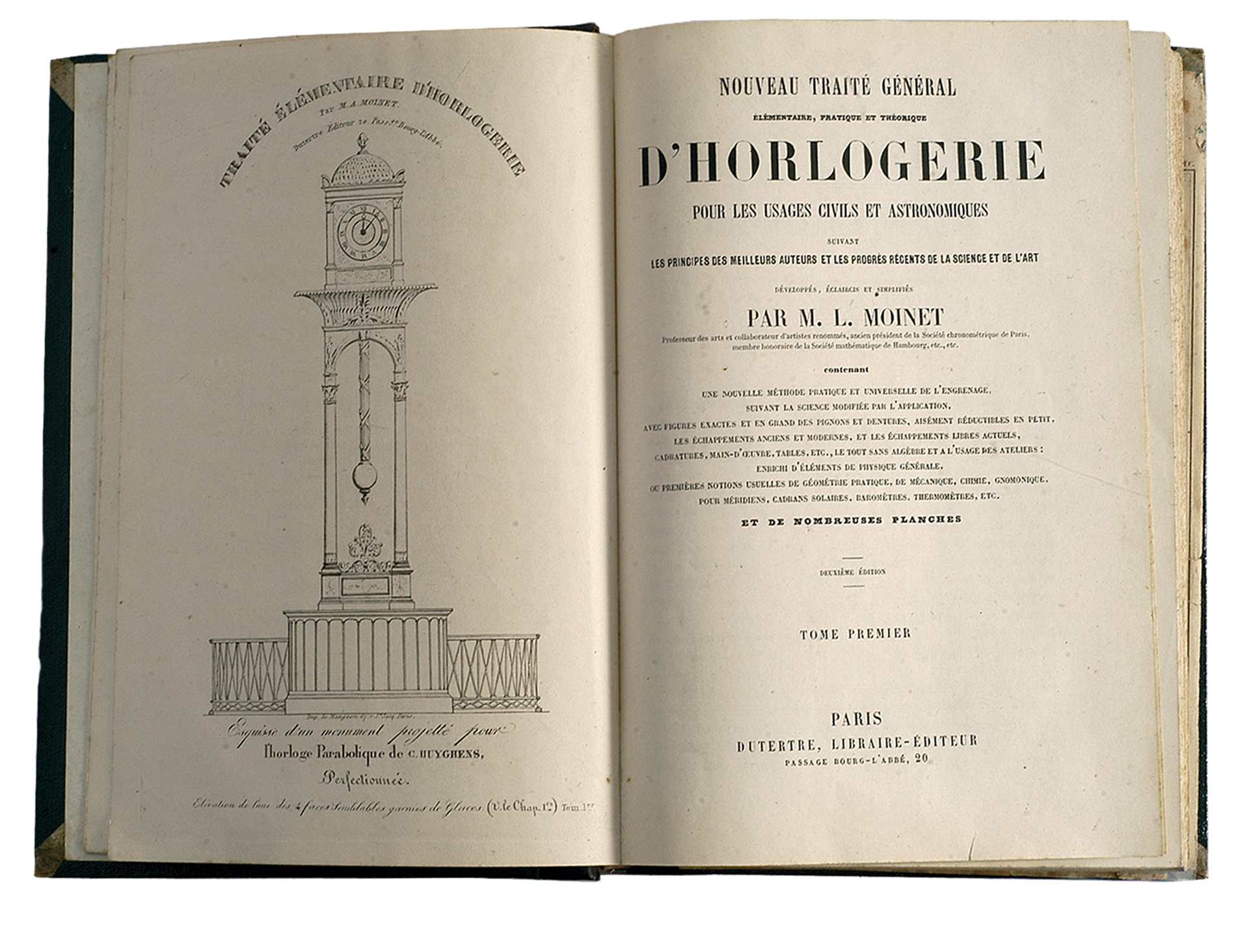
Traité d'Horlogerie by Louis Moinet.

As a maker of precision instruments, Louis Moinet perfected various techniques in these fields and developed several important new improvements. To enhance his astronomical observations, he invented a sensational instrument: a counter in the shape of a watch displaying 60ths of a second. The obvious advantage was a degree of superior to any other time measurement. One of its particularly original features was a jewelled escapement that oscillated at 216,000 vibrations per hour without any trace of wear nor increased friction during prolonged use.

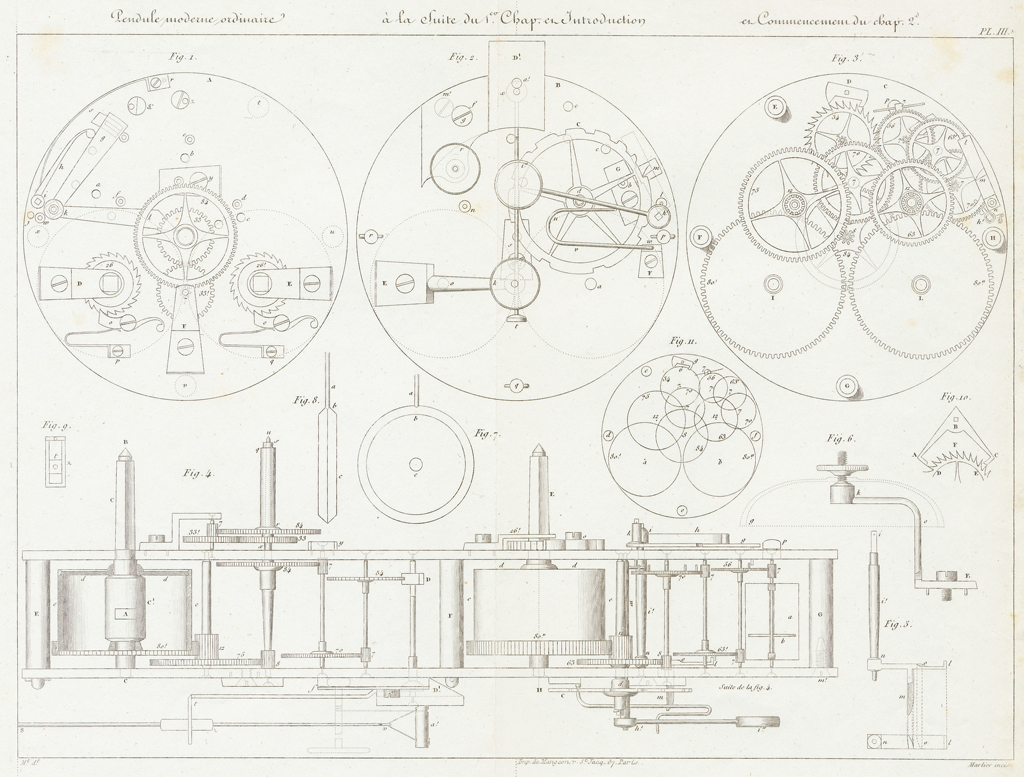
Double-page spread extracted from Traité d'Horlogerie by Louis Moinet.

=== "Traite d'horlogerie" by Louis Moinet ===
Moinet is the author of the celebrated watchmaking encyclopaedia first published in 1848. This work consists of two volumes and describes the most sophisticated and ingenious horological techniques.

This masterpiece is enriched by many illustrations and technical drawings, hand-made by Moinet himself. Moinet worked for twenty years on writing this treatise, which became the reference work of the period.

"First published in 1848, this is one of the greatest horological works of the century and contains some of the most clear and concise descriptions of clock-making ever written"—Chamberlain.

"This book is the most comprehensive, the best written and the most indispensable of all the books that have been written on watchmaking."—Panthéon Biographique Universel, Paris, 1853.
