= Double chronograph =

Type of watch complication

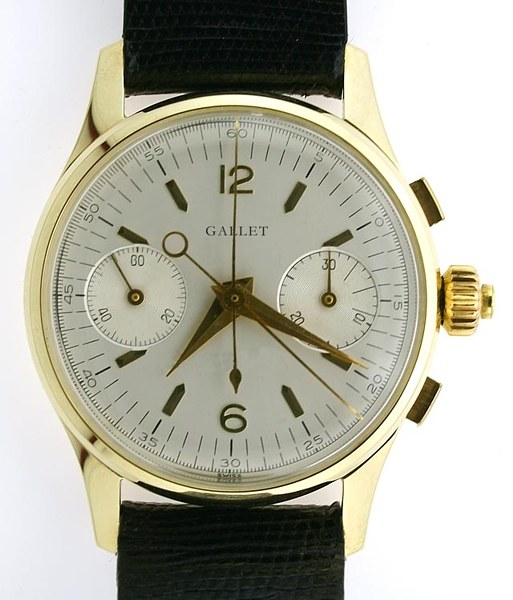
Double or rattrapante chronograph wristwatch (1948) - manufactured by the Gallet Watch Company in La Chaux-de-Fonds, Switzerland.

The double chronograph, also known as a split-seconds chronograph, is a watch that includes two distinct stopwatch mechanisms in order to measure two separate events concurrently and/or comparatively. It is often confused with the flyback chronograph.

== Other names ==
- Rattrapante chronograph (French: rattraper - the act of recovering, recapturing)
- Split-second chronograph
- Split chronograph

== Functioning ==
A watch with a double chronograph has two seconds hands. One hand is superimposed over the other. While one hand moves continuously, the other one can be either stopped, started or reset to zero.

The first push releases both hands. While one continues registering the time, the other hand can be repeatedly stopped. In order to stop and bring both hands to zero a watch has a return pusher. The position of the pusher, controlling the split-seconds function is usually at either 10 or 8 o'clock.

== Brief history ==
The double chronograph was previously called fly-back second, but nowadays 'fly-back second' relates to a chronograph where the timer resets instantaneously without the need to be stopped beforehand, and is to be distinguished from the double chronograph. It was invented in the 19th century by Adolphe Nicole. During the 1930s, due to a smaller size, the mechanism was able to fit the case of a wristwatch.

In 1923, Patek Philippe launched into the market its first double chronograph. Today, double chronographs (or rattrapante chronographs) can be divided into two subgroups. One comprises chronographs based on in-house movements of different watchmaking companies, and the other group contains timepieces based on movements like the Valjoux 7750 from ETA.

The group of the in-house movements began with the Venus series of calibers: 179, 185, 189 and 190. These calibers had a rattrapante pusher on the crown, but since 1952 they are no longer in production.

The first split-seconds mechanism based on the ETA-Valjoux 7750 was presented in 1992 at BaselWorld. Today, this caliber is the main one used in watches with a split-seconds mechanism.

In 2010, Gallet introduced the first self-winding double chronograph movement, powered by two separate mainsprings. The Swiss company's in-house manufactured calibre G330 solved the decades-old issue of decreased accuracy while utilizing the dual recording feature, a characteristic problem with double chronographs. Besides the longer duration (72 hours) between winds, this increase in available power enabled the G330 to maintain certified chronometer-level accuracy across the full range of functions.

In 2025, on the occasion of its 70th anniversary, the Chinese manufacturer Tianjin Sea-Gull introduced its first split-seconds wristwatch and the rattrapante movement ST1961, developed from the company's ST19 column-wheel chronograph platform. The movement has so far been used exclusively in Sea-Gull's reference 1077 rattrapante models. The initial 500-piece edition with a white dial saw notable commercial success, followed later that year by a blue-dial version. The ST1961 remains one of the few serially produced split-seconds chronograph calibers currently manufactured outside Switzerland.

== Bibliography ==
- Lang, Gerd R.; Meis, Reinhard (1993), Chronograph Wristwatches To Stop Time, Germany: Schiffer, ISBN 0-88740-502-9.
