= Tachymeter =

Tachymeter may refer to:

- Tachymeter (survey) or tacheometer, a type of theodolite used for rapid measurements of distance
- Tachymeter (watch), a scale sometimes inscribed around the rim of an analogue watch
