= Nicolas Mathieu Rieussec =

French watchmaker

- Born: Nicolas Mathieu Rieussec; 20 July 1781; Paris, France
- Died: 18 June 1866 (aged 84); Paris, France
- Occupation(s): Watchmaker, inventor, businessman
- Spouses: married to Anne Marie Delan until (m. 1806) Marie Pierrette Flore Bourdin (m. 1807–1866)
- Children: Joseph-Ferdinand Rieussec (1804-1881); Marie Clotilde Rieussec (died in 1842 and left 2 children)

Nicolas Mathieu Rieussec (20 July 1781 – 18 June 1866) was a French watchmaker.

== Surname origin ==
The Rieussec family's birthplace was the town of Lespinassière. Nicolas was the son of Joseph Rieussec, a merchant born in the 18th century in Lespinassière, in Languedoc, then one of the largest provinces in the kingdom of France. Today, Lespinassière is located in Aude, one of the five départements of the Languedoc-Roussillon region.

== Ancestry ==
Joseph Rieussec was in Paris at the end of 1778, although no one knows when he left his birthplace, the town of Lespinassière, for the kingdom's capital. His wife, Jeanne Michateau, was expecting. On 20 January 1779 she gave birth to their first son, Nicolas Joseph. On 20 July 1781, a few years before the outbreak of a revolution that was to lead to an upheaval in France and all of Europe, a younger brother arrived and was named Nicolas Mathieu Rieussec. The baby was baptised three days after his birth in the parish of Sainte-Marie du Temple. Nicolas Mathieu Bogganio, a banker residing on the Rue des Victoires in Paris, stood godfather, and the godmother was Marie Victoire Griveau, also residing on the Rue des Victoires. Joseph Rieussec held a literary salon. On an unknown date, probably between 1786 and 1788, he remarried Cécile Paillard. The family grew with the arrival of a third child, Lucile Clotilde Cécile, born on 25 October 1788. She died in 1818. Joseph Rieussec died in 1838. Nicolas Mathieu was born in Paris. Several sources put his birth in Toulouse, sometimes on 1 September 1781, which is not supported by any documents. In contrast, the royal warrant naming Nicolas Mathieu a Watchmaker to the King, is accompanied by a baptismal certificate from the registry of the Sainte-Marie-du-Temple parish in Paris.

== Early years ==
Still a minor, young Rieussec was set up as a watchmaker at no. 14, Rue du Marché-Palu, on the Île de la Cité. The Almanac du commerce de Paris pour l’an XIII (Paris Business Yearbook for Year XIII), i.e., 1805, lists 190 watchmakers, including the renowned Breguet. Rieussec does not appear. In contrast, five years later, he is listed among the 222 watchmakers in Paris. He did business at no. 14, Rue du Marché-Palu. Married to Anne Marie Delan, he had a son named Joseph-Ferdinand, born on 15 December 1804, a few days after Napoleon was crowned Emperor of the French. Two years later, Rieussec became a widower. His wife, born 21 July 1780, died on 1 May 1806. Less than a year later, on 7 February 1807, Nicolas Mathieu married Marie Pierrette Flore Bourdin in Sainte-Marguerite church. Time passed. The year 1815 and Waterloo arrived, during which Napoleon and his Empire was swept away in defeat.

== Watchmaker to the King ==
With the royalty restored, the throne passed to a Bourbon, Louis XVIII, brother of the late Louis XVI, who had been guillotined in 1793. All indications are that the new king did not consider Rieussec to be a loyal follower of Napoleon, or to have a black mark against his past. From 1817 on, Rieussec practiced his profession at no. 13, Rue Notre-Dame-des-Petits-Champs. Curiously, he also had a currency exchange there for an indeterminate period of time. That same year, the young watchmaker began to gain recognition when he was named a Watchmaker to the King in a royal warrant dated 31 January 1817.

“On this thirty-first day of January, eighteen hundred and seventeen, the King at Paris, having been made fully aware of the good life and moral conduct of Sieur Nicolas Mathieu Rieussec, and of the distinguished reputation he has acquired in his profession of Watchmaker, desires to confer upon him a mark of his favour and of the protection with which he honours him; for this purpose, His Majesty has granted and does grant him the title of his Watchmaker so that said Sieur Rieussec can enjoy all the honours, prerogatives and other benefits thereunto appertaining; His Majesty desires and intends that he may use said Title at all gatherings and on all public documents […].”

In 1817, there were already five Watchmakers to the King in Paris: Lepaute, Le Roy, Lépine, Robin, and Lamygonge. Rieussec was the sixth. It was not by chance that this honour had been obtained. Since 1815/1816, Nicolas Mathieu had been entrusted with “maintenance of the clocks for the Minister of the King’s Household,” or in other words the Royal Furniture Depository. Created at the beginning of the 17th century, the Royal Furniture Depository was the government office responsible for managing furniture and artwork used to furnish and decorate the royal residences.

An ambitious man, Nicolas Mathieu Rieussec did not stop with this warrant. Scarcely had he been named a Watchmaker to the King when he sought another warrant as Watchmaker to the Crown's Furniture Depository. Between May and June 1817, Rieussec sent a letter to the Baron de la Ville d’Avray, the general superintendent of the Royal Furniture Depository. Having worked for the Depository for nearly two years, Rieussec considered that he had a right to this warrant. Such a request was astonishing, as witnessed by the following letter dated May or June 1817.

“Now that Warrants as Watchmakers to the Royal Furniture Depository are being conferred, he feels that in asking for one, he is requesting only what is his due, since it is a consequence of his employment. Sieur Rieussec believes he is all the more justified since, out of six warrants with this title that were just conferred, only four of the watchmakers are, like himself, employed by the Royal Furniture Depository, and two (Messrs. Leroy and Lépine) are not at all, and so have been better treated than him if his request is not granted. Could the Watchmaker to the King warrant be regarded as a favour that would cause the other to be refused him? He cannot convince himself of that, for he values possession of the former too highly to believe that anyone could consider it a precluding honour. He therefore believes that the title of Watchmaker to the King does not influence the question of the other title in the slightest, and that that question is resolved by the legitimate rights conferred upon him by the duties he performs. Sieur Rieussec does not seek to hold two titles; his ambition was satisfied when he was granted the Warrant as Watchmaker to the King.

This is a right that he is asserting now. It is a favour obtained by Messrs. Leroy and Lépine, who are not employed by the Royal Furniture Depository at all. In contrast, Sieur Rieussec is indeed one of [His Majesty’s] watchmakers.”

He had no choice but to wait, especially since the warrant list for 1817 was already closed. The wait was a short one. In 1818, he was granted a warrant as Watchmaker to the Royal Furniture Depository.

== The “Chronograph” ==
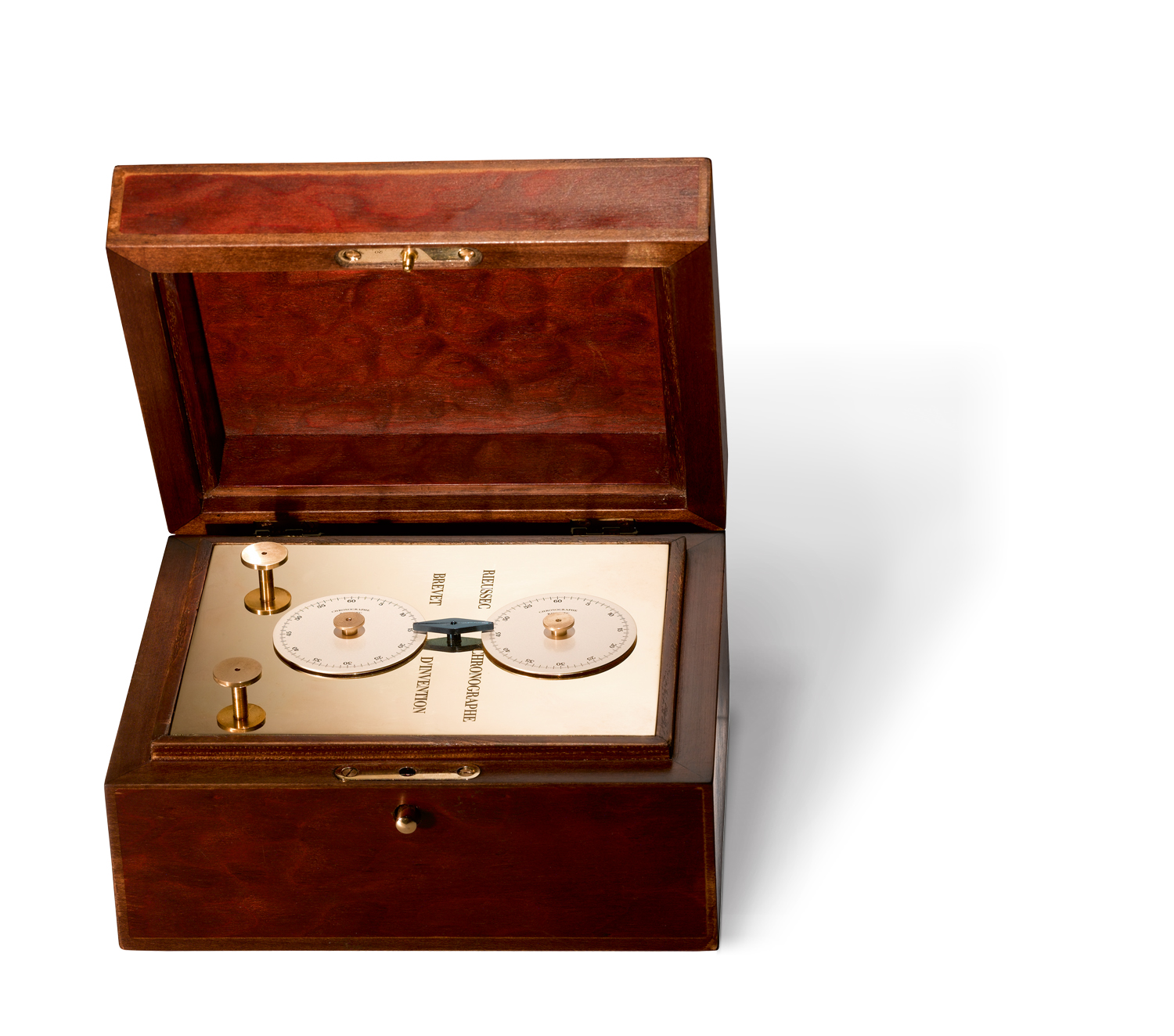
Chronograph invented by Nicolas Rieussec, 1821

The decade of the 1820s was one of the most prosperous in Nicolas Mathieu Rieussec's life. It certainly did get off to an auspicious start. On 1 September 1821 Rieussec attended the Champ-de-Mars in Paris - not as a race spectator come to watch the Arrondissement de la Seine race, but as a watchmaker testing a “chronometer intended to consistently measure the time horses take to travel the prescribed race distances - not only the winning horse, but also all those that cross the line after it.“ Rieussec's presence at the Arrondissement de la Seine race was not by chance. His elder brother, Nicolas Joseph, was an important person in French equestrian circles, which at the time were growing rapidly. Sixteen years earlier, on 31 August 1805, an imperial decree had established horse racing. It was in this context that, before 1805, Nicolas Joseph had founded the Buc stud farm, prior to purchasing that of Viroflay a few years later in 1812. He is also considered the promoter of the thoroughbred in France. Horse racing was the fashion, and young watchmaker Nicolas Mathieu quickly saw it as an opportunity to use his skill. Running the horses and determining the winner was one thing. Being able to measure the time for each of the racers was quite another. At this time, early in the 19th century, the need was felt for an instrument that could accomplish this.

On 1 September 1820 many prominent figures had come to the Champ-de-Mars. A practised eye would have recognized Joseph Jérôme, Comte Siméon, Minister, Junior Minister in the Ministry of the Interior; and Gaspard de Chabrol, Prefect of the Seine [département].

Chabrol's support was doubtless unnecessary, since the Minister had expressed his “kindness” to Rieussec the same day, giving him reason to “hope for a patent on the basis of public utility.” Both the Race Jury's report and Prefect Chabrol's letter referred to Rieussec's invention as a “chronometer” or a “timer.” There was as yet no mention of a “chronograph.” The tests were judged to be satisfactory for the time being, as witnessed by the Race Jury's report. Rieussec's invention met a real need. Better yet, it was a comfortable and reliable way to measure the times. Henceforth, there was “no fear of any errors.” It seemed destined for a promising future!

=== A “Chronograph with Seconds Indicator” ===
In the minutes of its meeting held on 15 October 1821, the French Academy of Sciences reports on Rieussec's invention, which he had presented to them two weeks earlier and which was examined by two of its members, Breguet and Prony. As Rieussec later wrote to Comte Siméon, it was this prestigious company that was the first to call his invention the “Chronograph with Seconds Indicator.” The expression caught on to such a point that it replaced “chronometer” and “timer.” Then and for all time to come, the term became “Rieussec’s chronograph.” Having the Academy's minutes is no small advantage. They provide a description of the chronograph and its operation that is among the most comprehensive in existence:

”The volume and shape of this instrument are about those of a large pocket chronometer. The dial is movable and turns about an axis that is perpendicular to its plane and passes through its centre. When the Chronograph is operating, this dial makes one revolution per minute, and since its circumference is divided into 60 parts, the angular motion of one division corresponds to one second. A small window next to the hanging ring reveals a number, which is replaced by another number with each revolution of the dial and indicates the minutes; the Chronograph can run about three-quarters of an hour without stopping.

To use this instrument, when it is mounted and in a resting state, one first sets the divisions marking the time to the starting points by turning a knurled knob with one’s hand. Through the intermediary of a gear train, the knob causes the minute and second dials to move. Having done this, when the moment to start timing arrives, one presses a small button next to the knob to set the machine in motion. The observer can give full attention to the phenomena whose successive time intervals he wishes to measure, and as soon as one of the divisions of these intervals is reached, he presses a second button next to the one we have just mentioned. At the moment when it is pressed a small pen, or metal point, passing through the open tip of a cone filled with black oil ink and placed opposite the moving dial’s fixed zero point, marks a point on the circumference that is divided into seconds. This point then indicates the second and fraction of a second corresponding to the beginning or end of the period of time being measured. Operation of the pen trigger mechanism neither stops nor slows the moving dial’s motion, so the button can be pressed several times while this motion lasts, making a number of black points on the scale divided into 60 parts; each point indicates, by its position, the moment when it was marked. To stop the chronograph quickly, one need only press the button that started it. The mechanism is arranged such that pressing this button abruptly changes the current state of the machine, making it pass from a resting state to movement or from movement to its resting state. We did not examine the inside of the instrument, and we do not think that it offers anything particularly remarkable, given the current state of watchmaking. Its principal merit lies in its ability to instantly indicate the first and last moments of several successive time intervals by means of permanent, visible signs on a moving dial, without requiring the attention of the observer’s eyes or ears. A chronograph with such a property unquestionably offers precious resources to physicians, engineers and, in general, anyone who measures phenomena. A highly satisfactory trial was recently made at public horse races; but its use can obviously extend to an infinite variety of other kinds of observations, the testing of moving machines, gauging of running water, and almost all hydraulic operations. The passage of a star over the cross-hairs of a telescope, when the astronomer has only one free hand, will be very precisely indicated by this new means, which will either serve to verify the count of the seconds on a clock, or will replace such a count if the distant location of the clock or poor hearing keeps the escapement from being heard. […]

We think that Mr. Rieussec’s Chronograph deserves the Academy’s approval.

In summary, on 14 October 1821, Rieussec presented his invention to the Academy of Sciences, which christened it a chronograph. The term was particularly well chosen: chronograph comes from the Greek words chronos and graphin, which means “that which writes time”. This system works as follows: a nib places a black mark on the dial at the moment when the phenomenon being measured ends. So the user can read the duration of the phenomenon - a horse race or something else - on the dial thanks to the time written by the hand. The chronograph was born!

=== Obtaining a Patent ===
Armed with the reports from the Race Jury and the Academy of Sciences, Nicolas Mathieu Rieussec sent a letter to “His Excellency, Comte Siméon, Minister, Junior Minister in the Ministry of the Interior.” Ambitious, he reminded the minister that the minister had given him cause to hope for “a Patent on the basis of public utility.” To support his request, he attached a copy of the previously mentioned reports and “the plans and designs for the component parts of the race Chronograph and of the one used for astronomy and for observation of phenomena requiring the strictest accuracy.” This last point is important. It tells that right from the beginning, Rieussec made two different chronographs - one tested at the 1821 Arrondissement de la Seine race, the other presented before the Academy of Sciences that same year. Rieussec's application, recorded by the Ministry of the Interior's departments, was examined by the Advisory Committee for Arts and Factories at a meeting on 22 December 1821. At its meeting on 2 March 1822, the Advisory Committee acknowledged the following facts: “Sieur Rieussec, Watchmaker to the King in Paris, requests a five-year patent for a timepiece that he calls a Chronograph. The description and design furnished by the petitioner were sufficiently clear and detailed; nothing stands in the way of granting the Patent.” One week later, on 9 March 1822, Rieussec obtained a five-year patent for a “Timepiece, or timer for distance covered, called a chronograph with seconds indicator, indicating the duration of several successive phenomena without requiring the observer’s attention.” In his application packet, Rieussec justifies the improvements he believed he had made to his chronograph. The following text is an excerpt from his justification:

“The first Chronographs, for which I obtained a Patent in 1821, were too large in size to be easily transportable as watches, due to the complicated parts that made up the mechanism. “Since that time I have attempted to simplify the mechanism enough so that chronographs could be incorporated into very small watches, and as will be seen in the description < >, I have even combined the chronograph movement and the watch movement in a single case, such that this instrument is always available to use. The simplifications that I have added are such that I can adapt this mechanism even to the most ordinary watches and put them on the market at a very moderate price.”

He was granted the patent on 16 January 1838. Apart from the simplifications noted above, Rieussec made another important modification to his chronographs. From that time on, they had a fixed dial and a moving hand.

=== Improvements to Chronographs ===
Still, it was not until the fall of 1837 that Rieussec filed a patent application for "Improvements to Chronographs". The wording of this application sounds like a manifesto: Ten-year patent for invention and various significant improvements made to chronographs, which he states he invented and improved. In his application packet, Rieussec justifies the improvements he believed he had made to his chronograph. Here is an excerpt from his justification:

”The first Chronographs, for which I obtained a Patent in 1821, were too large in size to be easily transportable as watches, due to the complicated parts that made up the mechanism. Since that time I have attempted to simplify the mechanism enough so that Cronographs could be incorporated into very small watches, and as will be seen in the description […], I have even combined the chronograph movement and the watch movement in a single case, such that this instrument is always available to use. The simplifications that I have added are such that I can adapt this mechanism even to the most ordinary watches and put them on the market at a very moderate price.”

He was granted the patent on 16 January 1838. Apart from the simplifications noted above, Rieussec made another important modification to his chronographs. From that time on, they had a fixed dial and a moving hand.

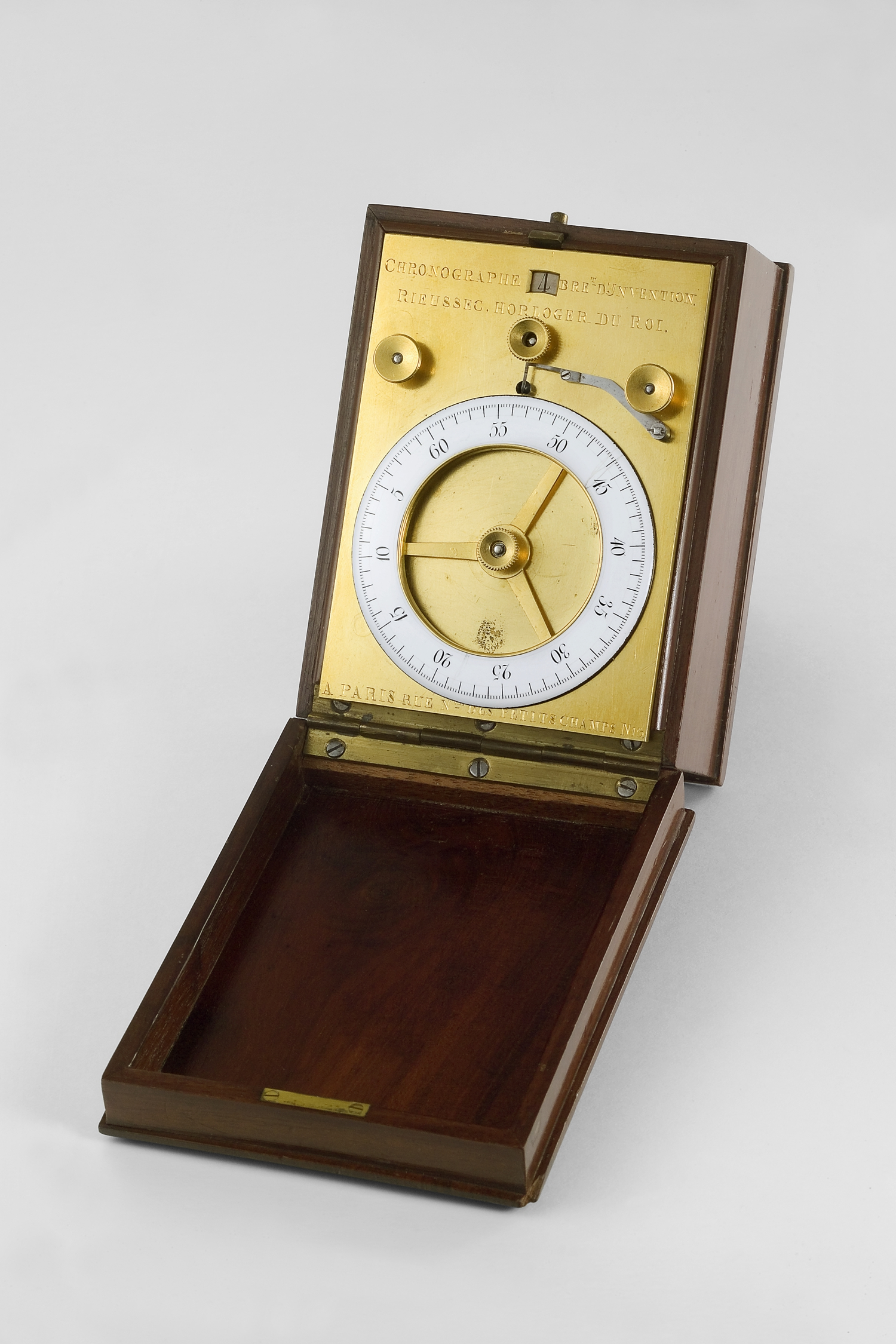
Improvements to Chronographs invented by Nicolas Rieussec - 1822

== Inventor ==
=== Other patents: From the Cart with Measuring Device to the Rieussec Snuffbox ===
On the eve of 1830, Nicolas Mathieu's brother Nicolas Joseph Rieussec was interested in selling heating wood. It was in this context of a new business being developed by his brother that our watchmaker filed two new patents, both completely unrelated to watchmaking. On 5 September 1832 he drew up an application for “a cart for transporting heating wood to a residence [and called a] cart with measuring device [voiture porte mesure] or improved dray.” An excerpt from one of the documents submitted with the file helps to imagine Rieussec's project:

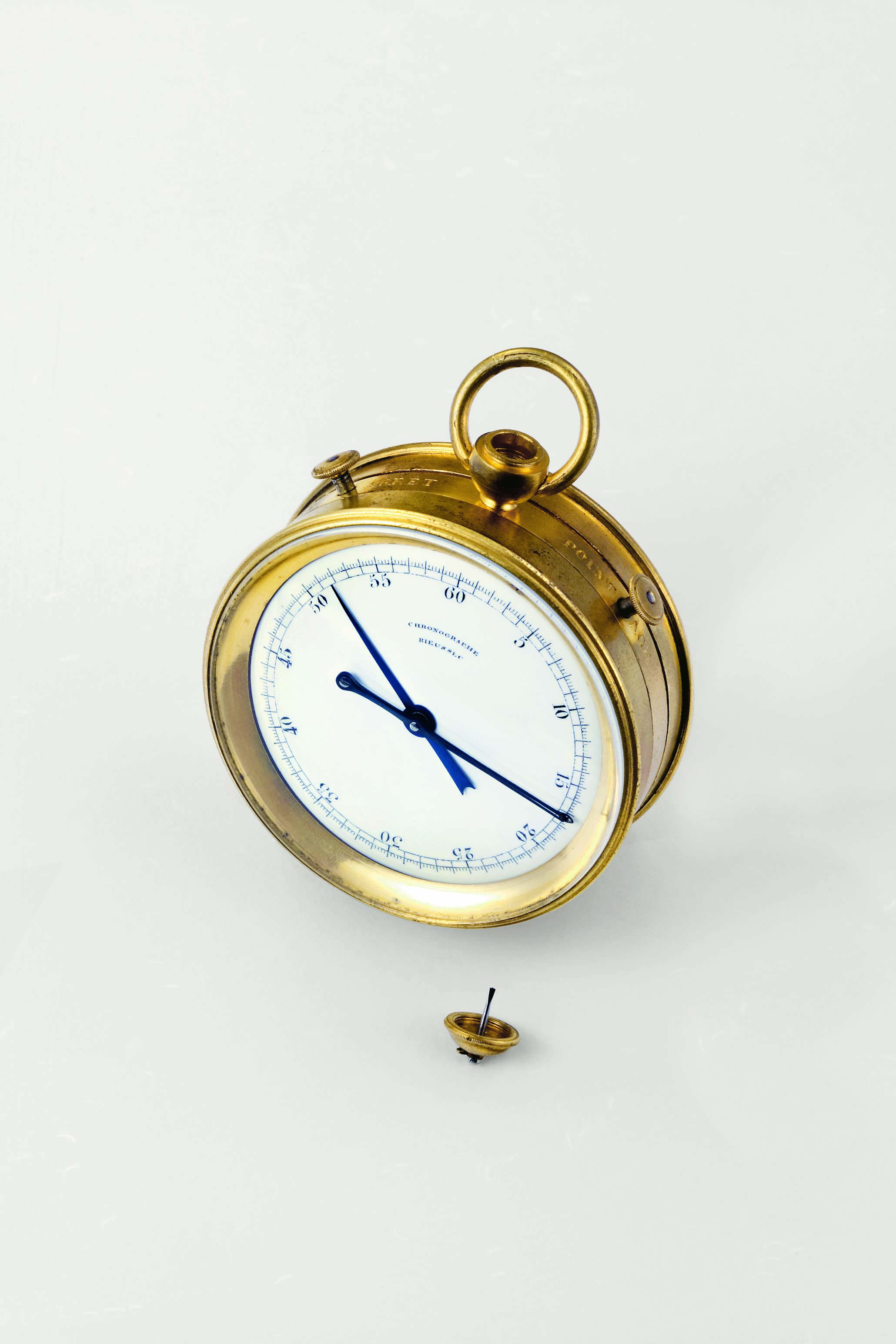
Improvements to Chronographs invented by Nicolas Rieussec - 1845

“This cart differs from those known as measuring carts [voitures mesures] mainly in that in these last, the frame that contains the wood to be transported, which is longer and more cumbersome, is placed above the axle and is part of the body of the cart, which necessitates the use of wheels with a small diameter to avoid having it be too high, but then one can see how difficult it is for the horse that has to pull the full cart, especially if it meets with an obstacle.

In contrast, the frame of the cart with measuring device is suspended beneath the axle, which allows for the use of large wheels […].”

He was granted a five-year patent on 5 October 1832. Some months later, Rieussec drew up a new application, again for an invention related to heating wood. This time, he claimed “a new and improved system of devices for sawing, weighing and measuring residential heating wood.” Rieussec's interest in heating wood is astonishing, for being so much a part of another time. Yet he did express real concern for some of his contemporaries’ daily concerns. Rieussec's career as an inventor did not stop there. In 1860, at the age of 79, he filed another patent application, his last. This time, it was for a “snuffbox system called the Rieussec Snuffbox.” Rieussec's last invention showed a concern for health that was before its time.

== A veteran of French watchmaking ==
=== An Award-Winning World’s Fair Exhibitor from 1823-1855 ===
During the first half of the 19th century, the French industrial sector was expanding rapidly. Its newness led public authorities to work toward encouraging a “copycat effect.” Consequently, industry lived by the rhythm of the expositions devoted to its products. From 1823 to 1855, Rieussec was a regular participant in these exhibitions, which initially were held every four years. The first world's fair was held in 1851, in London. Rieussec was there. In 1855, Paris hosted another world's fair, which gave the Second Empire an opportunity to celebrate industry and modernity. These expositions were an opportunity for Rieussec to collect new honours. In 1823, he exhibited an “astronomical clock with seconds, and a watch of his own invention, which he calls a chronograph.” This earned him a bronze medal. He was also among the exhibitors in 1839, when he introduced a new-style chronograph, after having obtained a patent the year before. The jury awarded him the bronze medal, a repeat of the one received in 1823. Rieussec was again present at the 1844 exposition. That year, “the jury [was] delighted to acknowledge how prolific Mr. Rieussec’s invention has been in terms of useful applications, and hasten[ed] to do him justice by awarding him a silver medal.” In 1851, he was in London exhibiting in the Crystal Palace. Once again, his products, attracted notice. “The ingenuity of the mechanical combinations used by Mr. Rieussec to conveniently and reliably obtain a result so valuable to experimenters so impressed the London jury that the creator of this mechanism was unanimously found worthy of the first prize, and - to the great regret of all the judges - was deprived of it only by the clause in the rules stipulating that the highest award could not be given to an invention more than twenty years old.” Which, however, did not prevent him from being awarded a prize medal. The 1855 world's fair was the crowning achievement of Rieussec's watchmaking career, as “this veteran of French watchmaking” was awarded a first-class medal.

== Supplier to the Royal Furniture Depository ==
Rieussec's work was not limited to sophisticated measuring instruments such as the chronograph, intended to make official measurements of time intervals, whether for horse races or scientific phenomena. His activity as Watchmaker to the Royal Furniture Depository gave him an opportunity to create movements for the clocks ordered to decorate certain rooms of the royal residences. In 1821, Rieussec delivered a clock called “Iris fastening on her wings” intended for the bedchamber of the Duke of Bordeaux, who was the grandson of the Count of Artois, brother of King Louis XVIII. Between 1820 and 1825, Rieussec signed a movement for a clock depicting Saint Vincent de Paul. This object was brought to Saint-Cloud castle in early 1826. In 1821, more active than ever, Rieussec delivered a superb clock representing “Sappho inspired by Love,” followed by a “Homer singing over the ruins of Troy”clock which he delivered to the Royal Furniture Depository that same year. During the last years of the Restoration (1815–1830) or the first years of the July Monarchy (1830–1848), Rieussec signed a movement for a clock representing the shepherd Belisarius, inspired by a painting shown by the painter Gérard at the Salon of 1795. These few examples are an accurate reflection of Nicolas Rieussec's great productivity between 1820 and the end of the Restoration. Having been Watchmaker to Louis XVIII (1815–1824), then to his brother Charles X (1824–1830), Rieussec remained a Watchmaker to the King under the following regime. Louis-Philippe, who was king from 1830 to 1848, appreciated Rieussec's work enough to keep him in his service. It was also during this time that Rieussec became associated with another watchmaker, Chaudé.

== Was watchmaking passed down from father to son? ==
The genealogies that were available to consult for this article repeatedly note that Joseph Ferdinand, the son of Nicolas Mathieu, born 15 December 1804, was a Watchmaker to the King. To date, there has not been found any document confirming this. It remains to be seen whether Joseph Ferdinand followed in his father's footsteps and became a watchmaker. One passage in the property inventory made after Nicolas Mathieu's death implies that the father left his business to his son. Here, again, there is no evidence attesting to the son's watchmaking activity. Everything there is to know about this is that when his father died, Joseph Ferdinand was a merchant and lived at no. 183, Rue de Grenelle-Saint-Germain, now Rue de Grenelle.

== Last years ==
Nicolas Mathieu Rieussec died at his home at 60 Avenue du Bel-Air in Paris, in 1866. The declaration of succession drawn up after his death noted that he was a gentleman of independent means at the time. His heirs were his son Joseph Ferdinand and the daughters of his own daughter, Marie Clotilde, who had died young in 1842. The inventory of Nicolas Mathieu's property, drawn up after his death, noted that the deceased was a Knight in the Order of the Legion of Honour. Unfortunately, there has been no trace of his file in the National Archives where the Legion of Honour's records are kept.

== See also ==
- The Chronograph
- Watchmaker
