= Flyback chronograph =

Watch complication

1928 Longines Wrist-Chronograph with the 1925 modified Cal. 13.33Z Flyback function. The oldest Flyback Chronograph in existence, to be seen in the Museum of Longines.

A flyback chronograph is a watch complication, in which the user can use a reset function without the need to first stop the chronograph, by a single press on an additional pusher at the 4 o'clock mark. In usual chronographs of the time, the user had to push three times for the same operation. First they had to stop the chronograph, then reset the hands at zero, and finally restart the chronograph in order to time the next sequence. A flyback chronograph shortens the time of operation needed to measure subsequent legs of a flight.

== Other names ==
The flyback function is also known by some other names:

- Retour-en-vol (French: retour - to return; en - on; vol - flight)
- Taylor system
- Permanent zero setting

== Overview ==
A flyback chronograph can be reset and restarted with a single press, without first stopping the chronograph. This allows successive time intervals to be measured quickly and has made the function useful in aviation.

Flyback chronographs have a different layout than the usual monopusher chronographs of the early 20th century. They usually have a push-piece at 2 o'clock to start, stop and reset the timer function. But they have an additional pusher at 4 o'clock, enabling to do the three actions (stop, reset, restart) all at once.

== Navigation purposes ==
Given the emergence of high-speed flight, e.g. Maurice Prévost reached 200 km/h in 1913, recording multiple time intervals with a conventional chronograph generated a significant margin of error. The aim of the flyback function was therefore to reduce this margin of error and help pilots to navigate more precisely.

== History ==
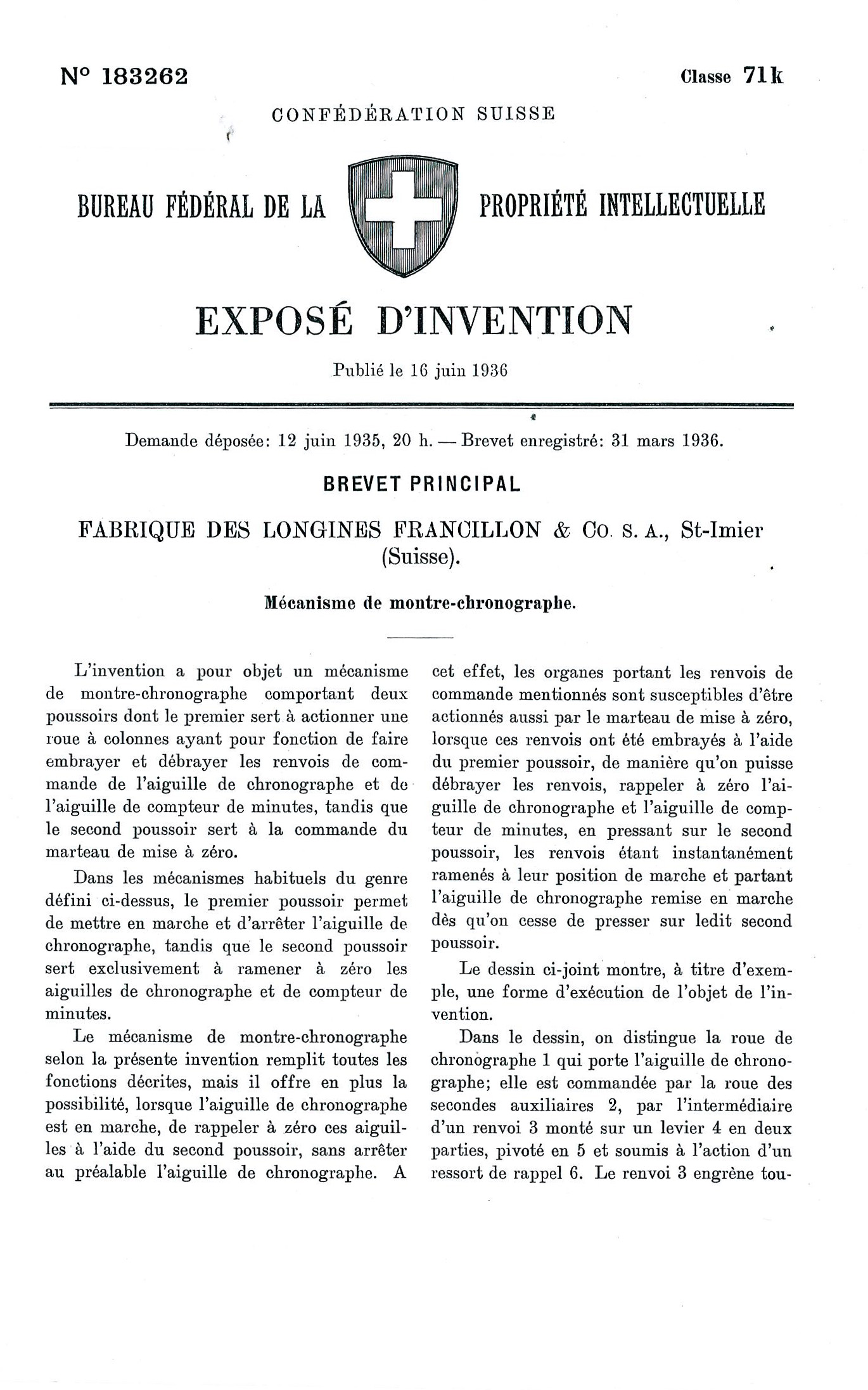
Patent attesting to the invention of the Flyback mechanism by Longines. The application was filed on June 12, 1935. The patent was registered on March 31, 1936.

The first model produced was a Longines wrist chronograph with a caliber 13.33Z movement in 1925. The flyback function served navigation and timing sporting events purposes in the 20th century. It was the first watch complication designed to record multiple time intervals such as calculating the time taken to travel between waypoints, measuring fuel consumption or perform coordinated maneuvers. Longines filed the patent for the flyback mechanism on 12 June 1935. It was approved and registered on 16 June 1936.

The flyback function has its origins in the development of aircraft. In fact, the early years of the 20th century not only made flying a reliable technology, but also developed aeronautical navigation systems. A major problem rapidly experienced by pilots: the high speed of the aircraft combined with the lengthy computations' methods meant longer periods of time flying in the wrong direction. This inexorably led to greater positional errors. At best, these navigational errors would cause the pilots to miss their destination. At worst, they would disappear somewhere in the middle of the ocean, deprived of precious fuel. Wiley Post, for example, carried three chronometers "because a minute of error in time meant a 15-mile error on the equator in the final calculation of position". The flyback function would become an important part of the solution: pilots would only have to press a single time on a pusher to stop, reset and restart their chronograph giving them much more accurate timing of the subsequent legs of a flight at high speeds. Thanks to the flyback function, anything involving time measured in sequences or at close intervals, such as dead reckoning or coordinated maneuvers, had been pushed to a higher level of accuracy.

Richard Byrd, who flew first over the South Pole in 1929, led several expeditions wearing a Longines wrist chronograph (cal. 13ZN) with flyback function.

== See also ==
- Double chronograph
