= Jucker (surname) =

Jucker is a common Swiss German surname. Notable people with this surname include:

- Albert Jucker (1844–1885), founder of Berli Jucker, a Thai import and export firm
- Beat and Martin Jucker, Swiss brothers who founded the Jucker Farm in 2000
- Ed Jucker (1916–2002), American basketball and baseball coach
- Mathias Jucker (born 1961), neuroscientist and researcher at the University of Tuebingen

== See also ==
- Jucker (disambiguation)
- Juncker, a similar surname
