= Jucker =

Jucker may refer to:

- Jucker (surname)
- Jucker Farm, a Swiss agrotourism company
- Berli Jucker, a Thai import and export firm based in Bangkok
- Jucker (card game), an Alsatian card game and purported ancestor of Euchre
