= Poljot Strela =

The Poljot Strela is a Russian hand-wound chronograph movement. Strela is Russian for "arrow".

Poljot produced the famous and popular "Schaltradchronographs" with the brands "Poljot", "Sekonda" and "Strela".

The price of an uncased chronograph-caliber 3133 is approximately EUR 35.00.

== Models ==
- Poljot
- Okean
- Sekonda
- Sturmanskie: Watch used in the Russian space program and Air-Force
- Strela: Watch used in the Russian space program

== Movements ==
=== 3017 ===
Introduced in 1959 the 3017 is a Russian clone of the Venus Model 70/150/152 column wheel chronograph movement.

- 19/21 jewels
- 18,000 bph
- two register, 45 minute

=== 3133 ===
In 1979 Poljot bought the closed production line equipment from Valjoux for their 7734 coulisse cam-lever chronograph movement.

- 23 jewels
- 21,600 bph
- two register, 30 minute

=== 31679 ===
- 25 jewels
- 21,600 bph
- moonphase

== See also ==
- Poljot
