= Naujawan =

Naujawan (lit. 'The Young Man') may refer to:

- Naujawan (1937 film), a 1937 Bollywood film by Aspi Irani
- Naujawan (1951 film), a Hindi film by Mahesh Kaul
- Naujawan (album), a 1996 album by Shaan
- Naujawan Bharat Sabha, a left-wing Indian association

== See also ==
- Young Man (disambiguation)
- Chal Chal Re Naujawan, a 1944 Indian film
- Hum Naujawan, a 1985 Indian film
