= Tachymeter (watch) =

Scale sometimes inscribed around the rim of an analog watch

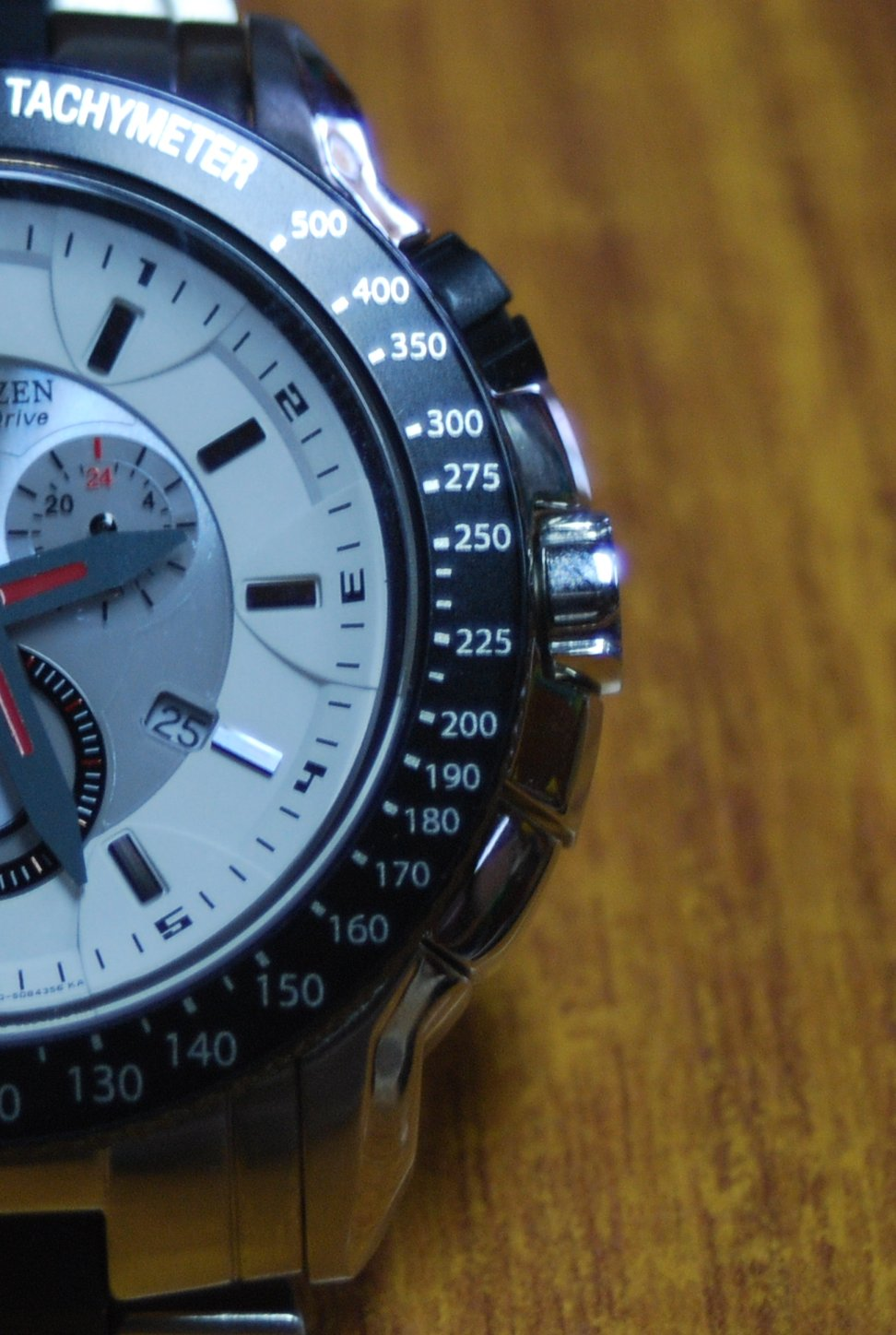
Tachymeter scale on a Citizen watch bezel

A tachymeter (pronounced /tæˈkɪmətər/) is a scale sometimes inscribed around the rim of an analog watch with a chronograph. It can be used to conveniently compute the frequency in inverse-hours of an event of a known second-defined period, such as speed (distance over hours) based on travel time (distance over speed), or measure distance based on speed. The spacings between the marks on the tachymeter dial are therefore proportional to 1/t , where t is the elapsed time.

The function performed by a tachymeter is independent of the unit of distance (e.g. statute miles, nautical miles, kilometres, metres, etc.) as long as the same unit of length is used for all calculations. It can also be used to measure the frequency of any regular event in occurrences per hour, such as the units output by an industrial process. A tachymeter is simply a means of converting elapsed time (in seconds per unit) to rate (in units per hour).

== Measuring speed ==
To use a tachymeter-equipped watch for measuring speed, the chronograph is started at a starting marker of a known distance. At the next marker, the point on the scale adjacent to the second hand indicates the speed (in distance between markers per hour) of travel between the two. The typical tachymeter scale on a watch converts between the number of seconds it takes for an event to happen and the number of times that event will occur in one hour. The formula used to create this type of tachymeter scale is

$$T = \frac{3600}{t}$$

where T is the tachymeter scale value; t is the time in seconds that it takes for the event to occur; and 3600 is the number of seconds in an hour.

Showing 35 seconds elapsed, about 103 units by calculation

As a sample calculation, if it takes 35 seconds to travel one mile, then the average speed is 103 miles/hour. On the watch, 35 seconds gives scale value 103. Similarly, if one kilometre takes 35 seconds then the average speed would be 103 km/hour.

Note that the tachymeter scale only calculates the average speed.

For events that happen either very quickly or slowly, one can adjust the sixty-second tachymeter scale commonly found on watches. Smaller fractional units can be used for slower objects, but the same X/hour function remains constant. The scale on a watch is only valid for things that happen in 60 seconds or fewer, and the scale is also difficult to resolve for events that take fewer than 10 seconds or so to occur. As an example, if it takes 100 seconds to eat an apple, cutting that number in half allows one to say that it takes 50 seconds to eat half an apple. Using the tachymeter scale one can calculate that 72 half apples (36 whole apples) could be eaten in one hour. Some watches, not common, have "wraparound" or "scroll" scales, which extend the readings to lower speeds, typically 45 units.

== Measuring distance ==
A tachymeter-equipped watch can be used to measure distance by timing the travel over the distance while the speed is held constant. The tachymeter scale is rotated to align with the second hand at the start of the length to be measured. When the second hand reaches the point on the scale where the speed indicated equals the speed of the vehicle, one unit of distance (miles if speed is miles per hour, kilometres if kilometres per hour, etc.) has been covered. For example, if you travel at a constant 80 mph (or at 80 km/h), then the distance travelled while the second hand sweeps to "80" (45 seconds) will be exactly 1 mile (or 1 kilometre at 80 km/h).

== Rotating scale ==
Some tachymeter scales are on a rotating, indexed bezel. This allows two additional modes of use: The tachymeter bezel can be aligned with a free running second hand, and, more subtly, can be used to find the average speed over longer times/distances. Set the rotary bezel index to the position of the minute hand, note the current mileage/distance. Glance at the position of the minute hand on the tachymeter scale 60 units of distance later, and average speed will be indicated. A little mental math allows interim averages, easiest at 1/4 (15 unit) and other integer values. Alternatively, instead of using minute hand, align index bezel to the second hand and observe passing one unit of distance when position of the second hand will then indicate average speed.

== See also ==
- Timex Black Max: various usages
