= Gottfried Junker =

Gottfried Junker (born 18 June 1950 in Günzburg) is a German independent film director and photographer.

== Life ==
Junker studied jurisprudence at the University of Würzburg. After the Staatsexamen 1975 he did his Zivildienst at a hospital. Motivated by that experience he abandoned law and worked as an assistant in medical care.

He started filmmaking as an autodidact, shot many Super-8 films inspired by Italian Neorealismo and French Cinéma Vérité, trying to create a dramaturgy of contemplation.

His first 16 mm feature film Kleine Zeichen (little signs) was conceived in 1981. It pictured a hike through a nameless mountain scenery, without using any spoken dialogue. Apart from lay actors it guest-starred Eva Mattes.

Junkers first film for the big screen, Versteckte Liebe (secret love), was shot in 1985 against the advice of the Bayerischer Rundfunk program director. This black-and-white film, casting Peter Cieslinski and Greek children, had been shot on Crete without a screenplay and barely using speech. Nevertheless, it positively surprised the critics, although in the end only two copies were shown in a few arthouse cinemas in Germany. In Japan the film found a distributor (Cinema^{10}) and aired several times on television.

The second and for the time being last art house film Das Haus im Ginster (The House in the Macchia) was produced in southern France in 1991. This time Junker used a small script. Ultimately the movie was not shown in cinemas but aired on late-night television.

From 1998 to 2007 Junker travelled a lot to shoot a worldwide photo series on contemporary artists (black-and-white, negative image size: 6 cm × 7 cm), picturing more than 600 artists, international stars and outsiders.

== Filmography ==
- Am Feuer (At the Fireside), 1980, 16mm.
- Kleine Zeichen (Little Signs), 1981, 16mm.
- Der Weg in den Wald (The Path Into the Forest), 1984, 16mm.
- Versteckte Liebe (Secret Love), 1985, 35mm.
- Das Haus im Ginster (The House in the Macchia), 1991, 35mm.
