= Chronograph =

Type of watch

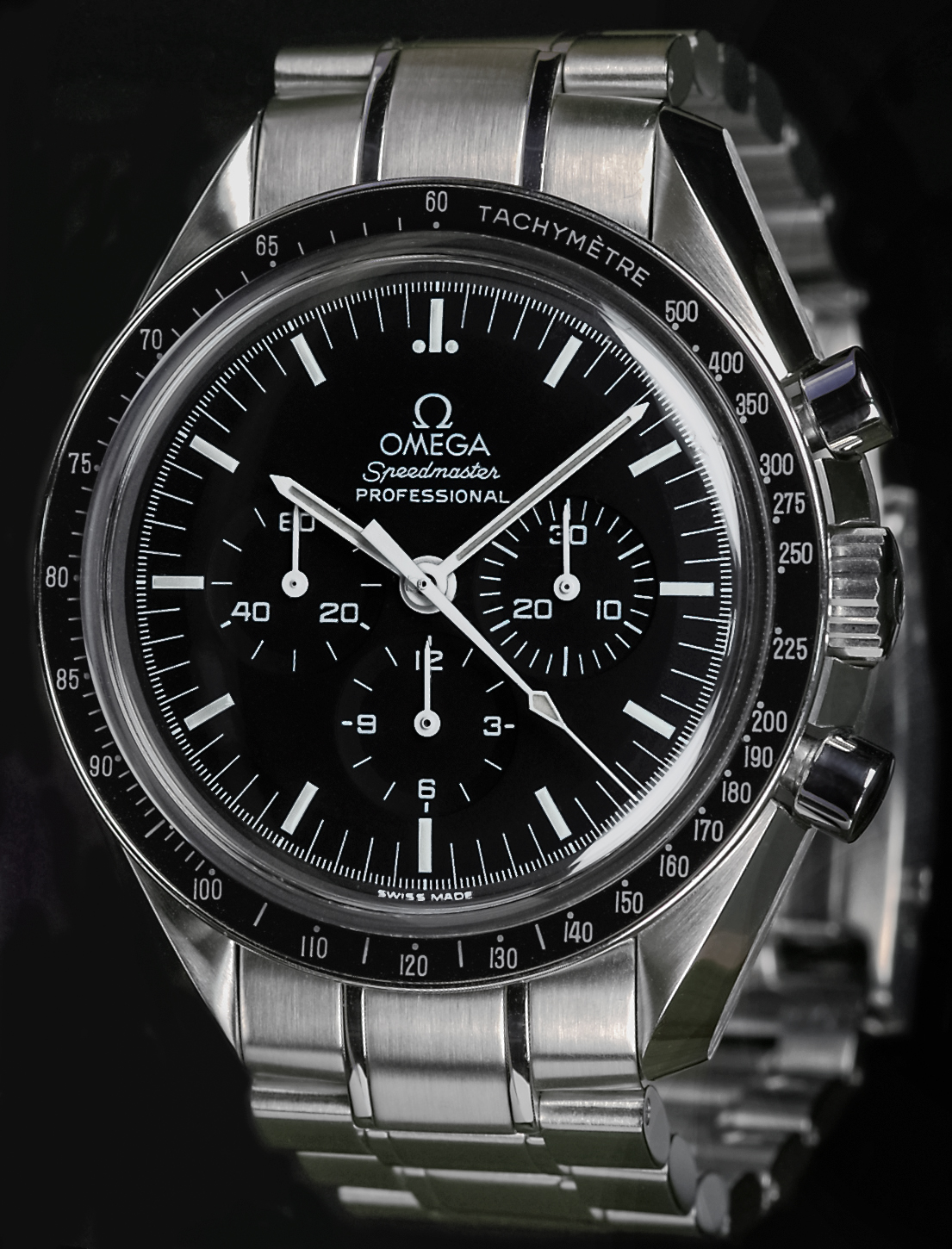
An Omega Speedmaster Professional, which is commonly regarded as one of the most iconic chronographs ever produced

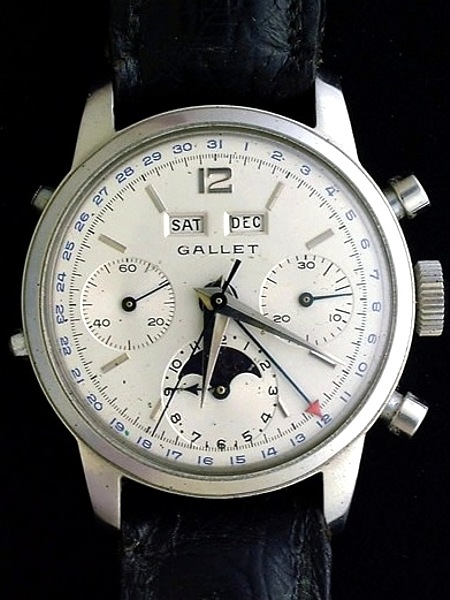
Gallet MultiChron Astronomic (c. 1959) — Complex mechanical chronograph with 12-hour recording capabilities, automatic day, date, month, and moon phase display

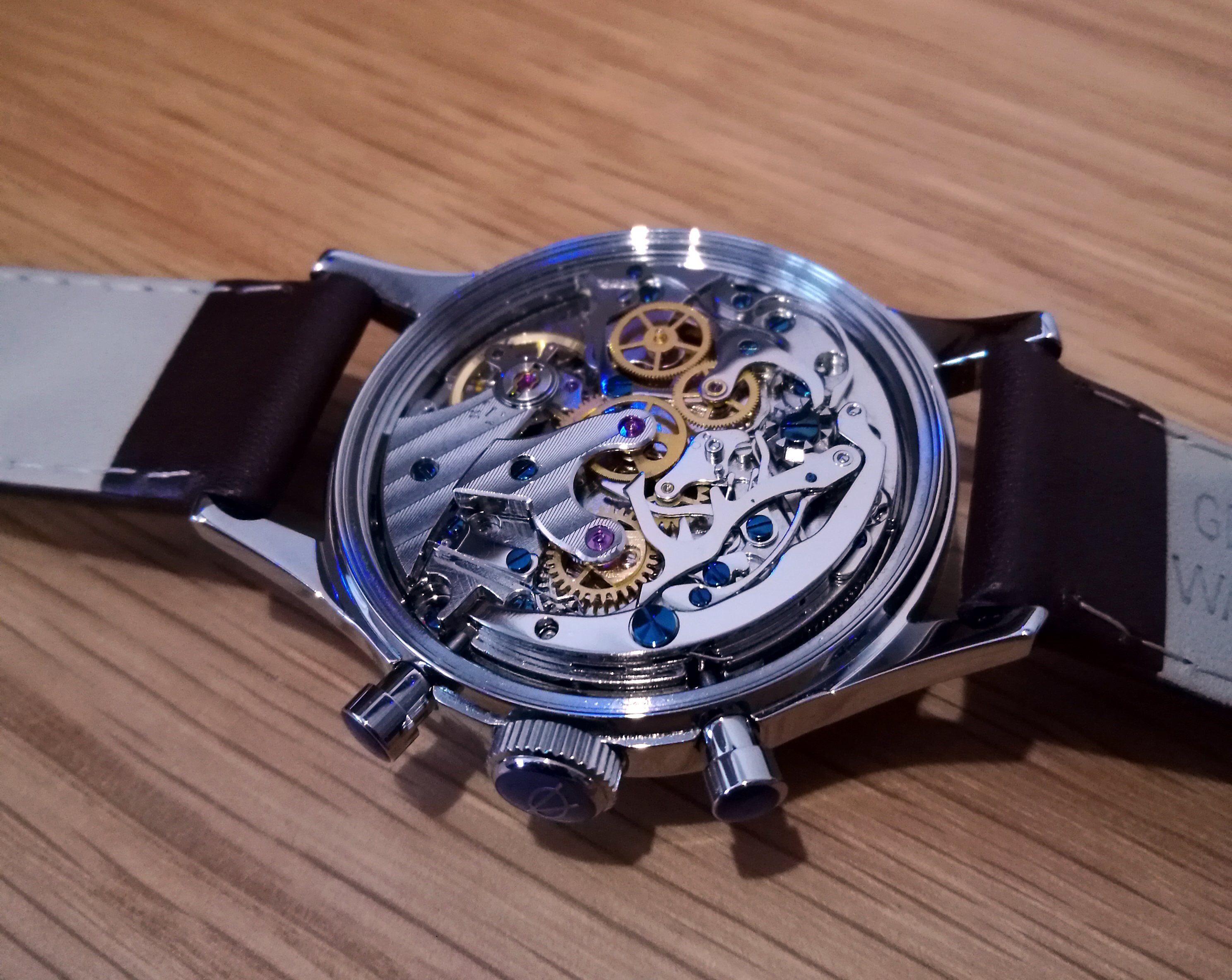
Tianjin Sea-Gull ST1901 chronograph movement (based on the Swiss Venus 175)

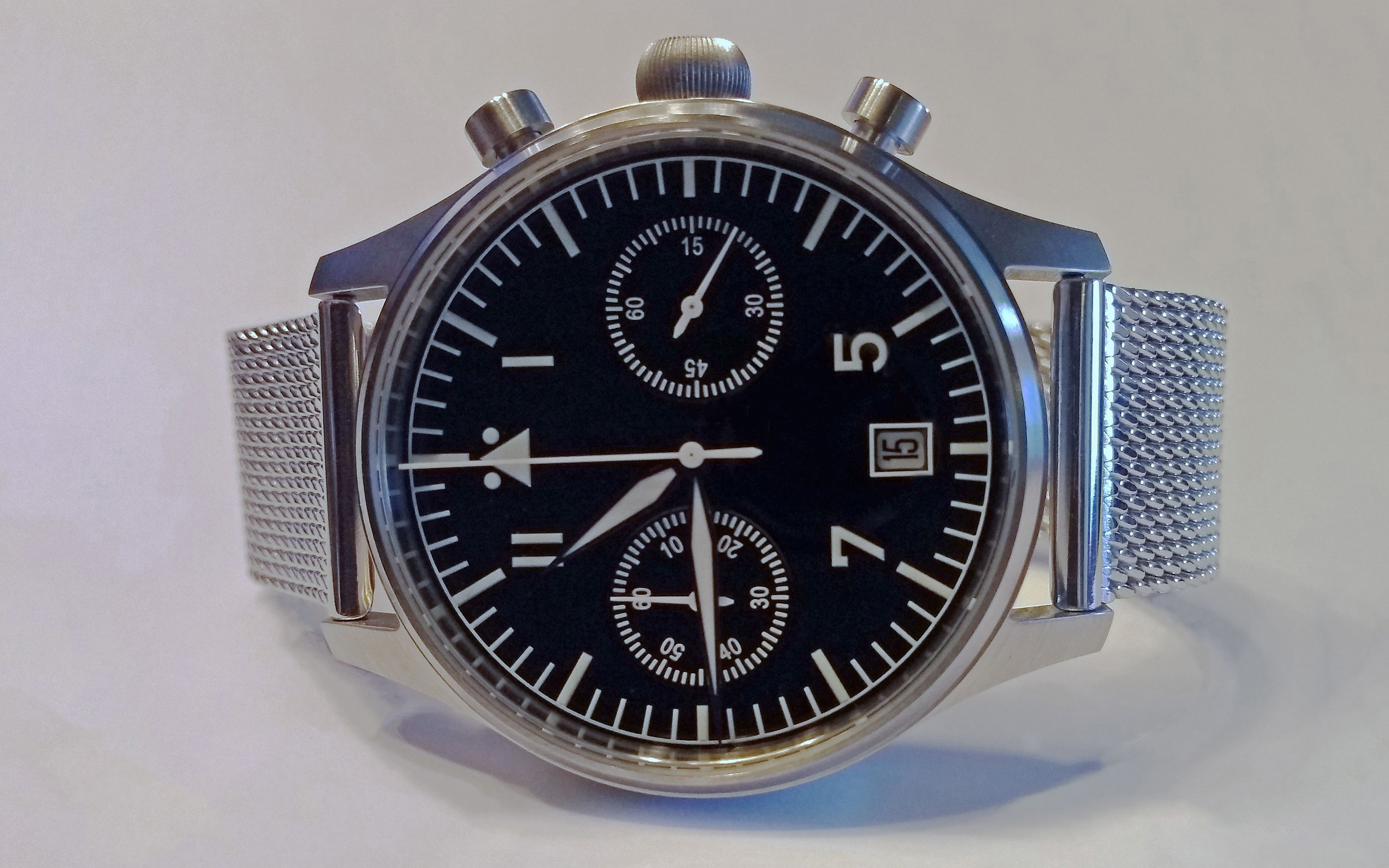
Escapement Time Quartz Pilot Watch containing a Japanese movement

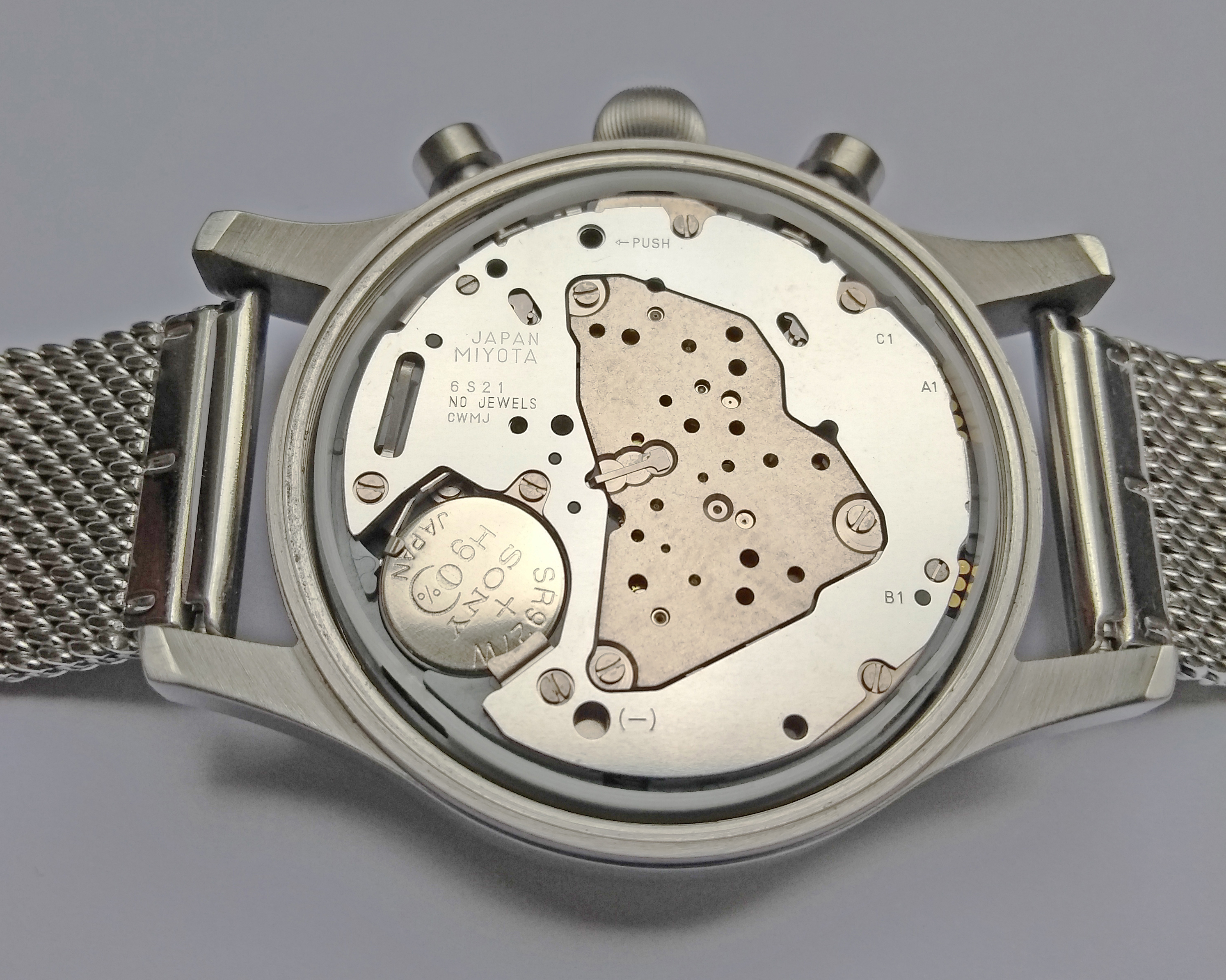
Miyota caliber 6S21 quartz chronograph movement

Quartz chronograph and its movement

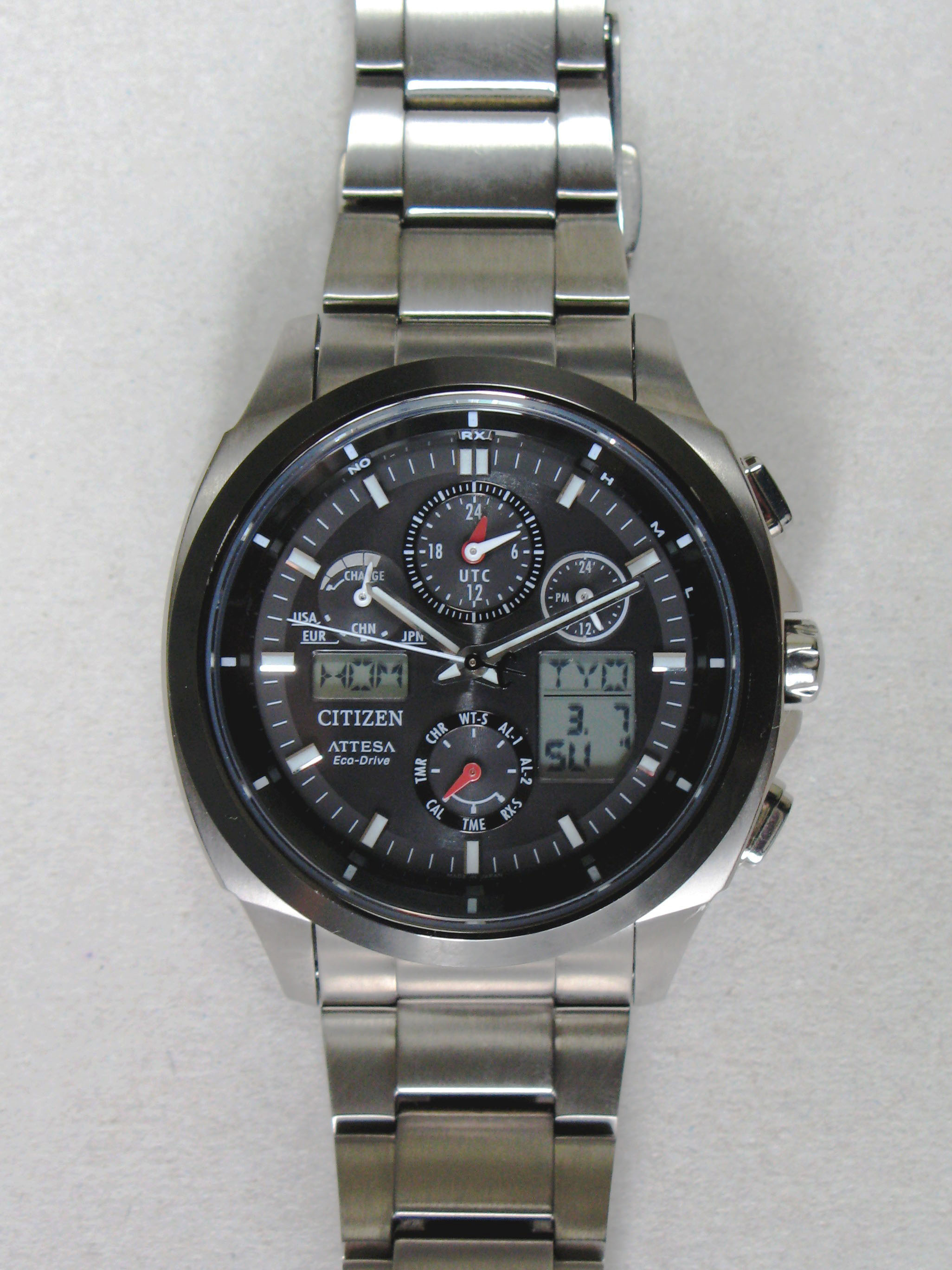
Citizen Atessa Eco-Drive ATV53-3023 analog-digital chronograph with 4 area radio controlled reception (North America, Europe, China, Japan)

A chronograph is a type of watch which is a stopwatch combined with a standard watch. A basic chronograph has hour and minute hands on the main dial to tell the time, a small seconds hand to tell that the watch is running, and a seconds hand on the main dial (usually equipped with a sweeping movement for precision) accompanied by a minutes sub dial for the stopwatch. Another sub dial to measure the hours of the stopwatch may also be included on a chronograph. The stopwatch can be started, stopped, and reset to zero at any time by the user by operating pushers usually placed adjacent to the crown. More complex chronographs often use additional complications and can have multiple sub-dials to measure more aspects of the stopwatch such as fractions of a second as well as other helpful things such as the moon phase and the local 24-hour time. In addition, many modern chronographs include tachymeters on the bezels for rapid calculations of speed or distance. Louis Moinet invented the chronograph in 1816 for use in tracking astronomical objects. Chronographs soon found use in artillery fire in the mid to late 1800s, and over times became fixtures in fields as diverse as aircraft piloting, auto racing, diving and submarining.

Since the 1980s, the term chronograph has also been applied to all digital watches that incorporate a stopwatch function.

== History ==
The term chronograph comes from the Greek χρονογράφος (khronográphos 'time recording'), from χρόνος (khrónos 'time') and γράφω (gráphō 'to write'). Early versions of the chronograph are the only ones that actually used any "writing": marking the dial with a small pen attached to the index so that the length of the pen mark would indicate how much time had elapsed. The first modern chronograph was invented by Louis Moinet in 1816, solely for working with astronomical equipment. It was Nicolas Mathieu Rieussec who developed the first marketed chronograph at the behest of King Louis XVIII in 1821. The King greatly enjoyed watching horse races, but wanted to know exactly how long each race lasted, so Rieussec was commissioned to invent a contraption that would do the job: as a result he developed the first ever commercialized chronograph. Rieussec was considered the inventor of the chronograph until the Louis Moinet pocket chronograph discovery in 2013 when history was rewritten. In addition to inventing the chronograph, Louis Moinet is also the father of High Frequency. In 1816, his Compteur de Tierces timepiece beat at a rhythm of 216,000 vibrations per hour (30 Hz). This frequency record stood for exactly one century, before eventually being broken in 1916, after which standard chronometer frequencies returned to present-day levels (generally 5–10 Hz, or 18,000 to 36,000 vibrations per hour). Still in perfect working order, the Compteur de Tierces is preserved at Ateliers Louis Moinet.

In 1913, Longines created the 13.33Z, one of the first chronograph movements ever developed for a wristwatch, featuring 18 jewels, a diameter of 29 mm and height of 6 mm, and a beat rate of 18,000 vph. It utilized a crown that was used both for winding the watch and serving as a pusher for the chronograph.

In 1915, Gaston Breitling produced the first chronograph with a central seconds hand and a 30-minute counter. Later, in 1923, Gaston Breitling introduced the first chronograph with a separate pusher at 2 o'clock. In 1934 Willy Breitling further developed the concept of the chronograph with the addition of the second pusher at 4 o'clock. Since then the 3-pusher chronograph design has been adopted by the entire industry.

In 1844 Adolphe Nicole's updated version of the chronograph was the first to include a re-setting feature which now allowed successive measurements, unlike the constantly moving needle in the original chronograph.

In the early part of the 20th century, many chronographs were sold with fixed bezels marked in order to function as a tachymeter. In 1958 the watch company Heuer introduced a model with a rotating bezel tachymeter for more complex calculations.

Chronographs were very popular with aviators as they allowed them to make rapid calculations and conduct precise timing. The demand for chronographs grew along with the aviation industry in the early part of the 20th century. As the US exploration of outer space initially involved only test pilots, by order of President Dwight D. Eisenhower, chronographs were on the wrists of many early astronauts. Chronograph usage followed a similar trajectory for many fields that involve very precise and/or repeated timing around increasingly more complicated high performance machinery, automobile racing and naval submarine navigation being two examples. As different uses for the chronograph were discovered, the industry responded with different models introducing such features as the flyback (where the second hand could be rapidly reset to zero), minute and hour timers, rattrapante (or multiple second hands one of which can be stopped and started independently) and waterproof models for divers and swimmers.

Although self winding watches and clockwork have been around since the late 1700s, the automatic (self winding) chronograph was not invented until the late 1960s. In 1969, the watch companies Heuer, Breitling, Hamilton, and movement specialist Dubois Dépraz, developed an automatic chronograph in partnership. They developed this technology secretly in an effort to prevent other watchmaking houses from releasing an automatic chronograph first, namely their competition Zenith and Seiko. It was in Geneva and in New York that this partnership shared their first automatic chronograph with the world on March 3, 1969. These first automatic chronographs were labelled "chrono-matic". But Zenith pre-empted them by unveiling their automatic chronograph 'El Primero' on January 10th, 1969. Seiko also pre empted the "chrono-matic" group by releasing their first automatic chronograph in February 1969, but the model was only available in the Japanese market. Some of the Seiko chronographs with December 1968 manufacturing date have been unearthed in Japan, pointing to an earlier domestic release, which were not known previously outside of Japan.

Many companies sell their own styles of chronographs. While today most chronographs are in the form of wristwatches, in the early 20th century pocket chronographs were very popular.

== Uses ==
The term chronograph is often confused with the term chronometer. Where "chronograph" refers to the function of a watch, chronometer is a measure of how well a given mechanical timepiece performs: in order to be labeled a chronometer the timepiece must be certified by the COSC, the official Swiss chronometer testing institute, after undergoing a series of rigorous tests for robustness, accuracy and precision under adverse conditions (though these requirements fall far short of the accuracy achieved by even the cheapest modern quartz watch). A simple mechanical watch, without the stopwatch functionality, can be certified a chronometer, as can a clock, for example a ship's clock, used for navigation. The terms are not mutually exclusive either, for instance the Omega Seamaster 300M Chronograph GMT Co-Axial is also a COSC certified chronometer.

Originally the term chronograph was mainly used in connection with artillery and the velocity of missiles. The chronograph's main function is to allow a comparison of observation between a time base and, before the electronic stopwatch was invented, a permanent recording of the observer's findings. For example, one of the first applications of the chronograph was to record the time elapsed during horse races.

Some more important uses of the chronograph include the Langley Chronograph, which is used by the US Navy to record, calculate, and analyse data given off by aeroplane launching catapults. Another famous usage of the chronograph was during NASA's Apollo missions to the moon, when each astronaut was equipped with a fully functioning chronograph, the Omega Speedmaster; in one instance, a Bulova chronograph was used. Chronographs are routinely used to record heart beats within hospitals, calculate speed and/or distance on athletic fields, or even as simple timers in kitchens.

== Function ==
Chronographs can be extremely complicated devices, but they all have the basic function of telling time, as they are watches, and of displaying elapsed time. Rieussec's chronograph was fairly simple. It was composed of two faces, a top and bottom face. The bottom face held a pool of ink, while the upper had a pen-like needle attached to it. When activated, the upper face pushed down on the lower face, while revolving around a central axis, which pulled the needle. This dragged the ink, in a circular fashion, recording the time elapsed by the line of ink that the motion created. There was room left for improvement, because Rieussec's chronograph was not easily ready for multiple uses.

This paved the way for the hundreds of patents that have been handed out to people for updating and upgrading this device. Automatic, non-digital chronographs do not require a battery, because the arm or wrist of the wearer creates kinetic energy, which results in the total energy source needed for this device to work. Throughout the day, while the wearer of the watch is walking, the swinging motion of his arm forces a semicircular rotor to turn on a pivot within the watch. The rotor is attached to a ratchet that winds the mainspring in the watch, so that it is ready for use at all times.

The modern day chronograph works by pushing a start button, normally located at the two o'clock position, to begin recording time, and by pushing the same button to stop the recording. When the button is pushed to start the recording, a series of three (in more complicated and more precise chronographs there are more wheels) train wheels start turning. The smallest has a revolution time of one second, the next sixty seconds, and the final one has a revolution time of sixty minutes. The three train wheels interact with one another and record how long it has been since the start button has been activated.

In addition to the start button, it also features a reset button normally located at the four o'clock position. When the reset button is pushed the chronograph hand will reset back to zero.

Tachymeter bezels are a complication that allows rapid calculations of speed or distance. Rotating bezels allow for more complex calculations or repeated calculations without requiring a reset of the timer.

== Types ==
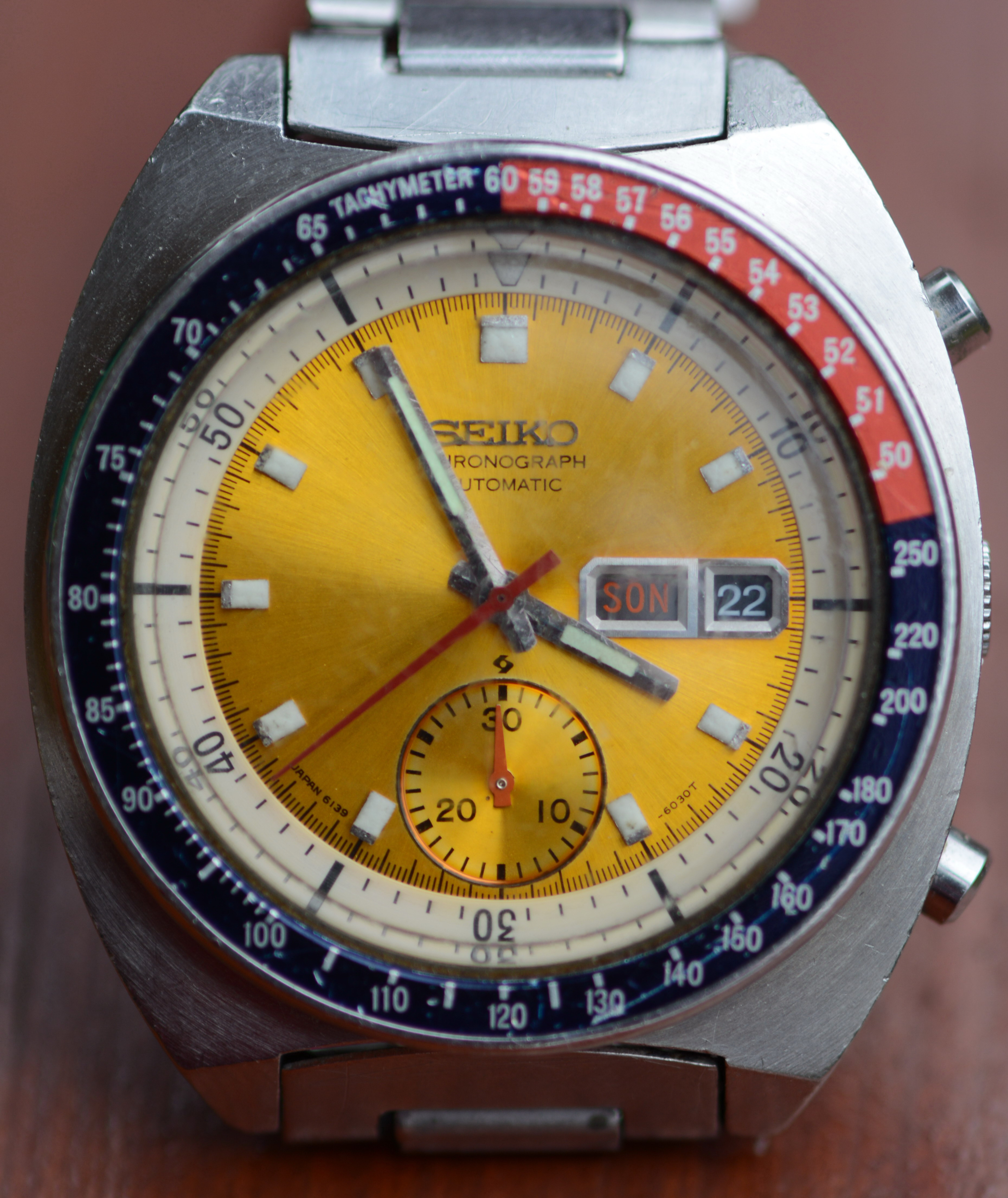
A 'Seiko Automatic-Chronograph' Cal. 6139, the Pogue Seiko, the first automatic chronograph in space

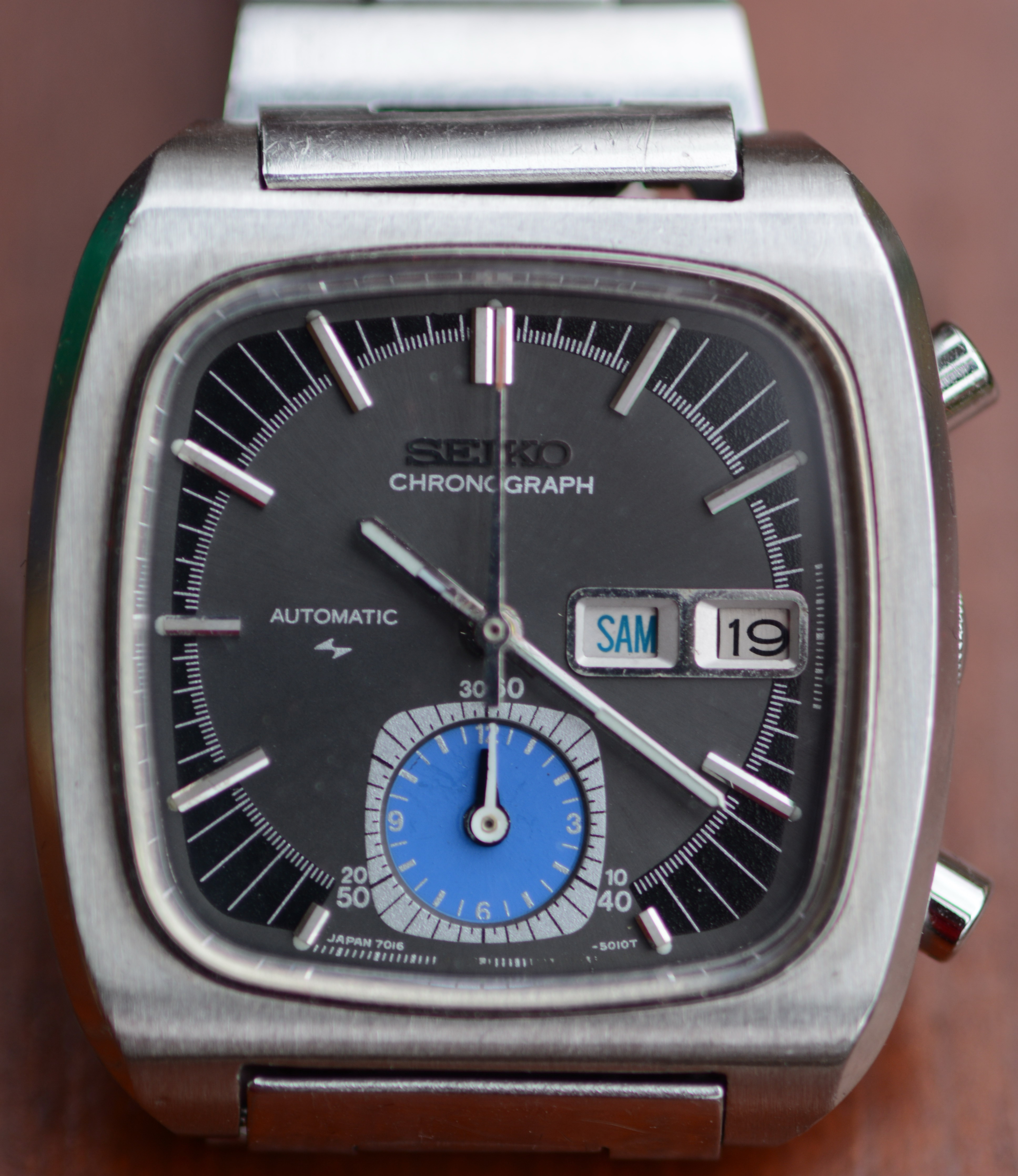
Seiko Flyback-Automatic-Chronograph Cal. 7016, the so-called „Seiko-Monaco“ (1976)

The original chronographs that Rieussec invented were called tape chronographs. They consisted of a tape that was constantly being dragged along at a controlled speed. When activated, a pen would be pushed onto the tape and begin recording until deactivated.

Specialized chronographs are used by deep sea and scuba divers. While basic functionality is the same as other chronographs, diving models have longer and more practical straps to wear over equipment, are made to be waterproof to deeper depths, have more rounded corners to prevent catching and luminous dials for reading in the murky depths.

Metered bezels: Many chronographs have a bezel, that is either fixed or can rotate, around the outside of the dial that is marked to specific scales to allow rapid calculations. While any wristwatch can have a bezel, the chronograph stop start feature, as well as the rotation of the bezel, allows more complex calculations or repeated measurements for a series of calculations. The most popular meter is for tachymeter readings: a simple scale that allows rapid calculations of speed. Other bezels feature telemeter scale, for distance. The watchmaking company Breitling offers a model with a rotating bezel, in conjunction with another, fixed, meter on the dial, scaled for use as a slide rule for more complex calculations.

Flyback chronographs have a timing hand that can be rapidly reset, or flyback, to zero. Ordinarily the sweep second hand is stopped to record the time and started again at that spot on the dial, or reset by spinning the second hand all the way to zero again, clockwise. The flyback allows a reading and a quick reset—a counterclockwise flyback—for the next measurement to start at zero.

A rattrapante, sometimes called a double chronograph, has multiple second hands, at least one of which can be stopped and started independently. When not activated, the second hands travel together, one under the other, to appear as just one second hand.

A tourbillon, although not strictly limited to chronographs, is an escapement set in a cage and placed in a rotating balance in order to minimize the effects of gravity on the escapement and increase precision. Because chronograph escapements are generally larger and connect with more complications, a tourbillon in a chronograph will differ from a tourbillon in a more simple timepiece.

Other types of modern-day chronographs are the automatic chronograph and the digital chronograph. The automatic chronograph depends solely on kinetic energy as its power source, while the digital chronograph is much like the common stopwatch and uses a battery to gain power, as well as quartz for timing.

Other, more specific, types of chronographs include split second chronographs, tide chronographs, and asthmometer chronographs. Each of these chronographs has an added feature that sets them apart.

== Telemeter ==
The telemeter chronograph allows the user to approximately measure the distance to an event that can be both seen and heard (e.g. a lightning bolt or a torpedo strike) using the speed of sound. The user starts the chronograph (stopwatch) at the instant the event is seen, and stops timing at the instant the event is heard. The seconds hand will point to the distance measured on a scale, usually around the edge of the face. The scale can be defined in any unit of distance, but miles or kilometers are most practical and commonplace.

== See also ==
- Gun chronograph
- Marine chronometer
- Mission timer
- Poljot Strela
- List of 24-hour watch brands
