= Panek =

Panek (Czech: Pánek) is a surname of Czech and Polish origin.

It is derived from the Slavic word pan (Czech: pán), meaning "lord", "master", or "sir". The surname is a diminutive form, likely originating as a nickname meaning "little master" or "young gentleman" (sometimes used affectionately, sometimes ironically as "lordling").

Some sources also suggest it may be a pet form of the personal names Pancratius (Pankrác) or Stephanus (Štěpán).

== Notable people ==
Notable people with the surname Panek or Pánek include:

- Anita Dolly Panek, Brazilian biochemist
- Jerry Panek, Polish-American skier
- Maciej Panek, Prezes Panek S.A.
- Natalie Panek, Canadian aerospace engineer
- Tracey Panek, New Zealand Māori historian and archivist
- Yolanda Panek (1974 – disappeared 1995), American female murder victim
- Zbyněk Pánek, Czech skier

== See also ==
- Baronet
