= Karl Junker =

German painter

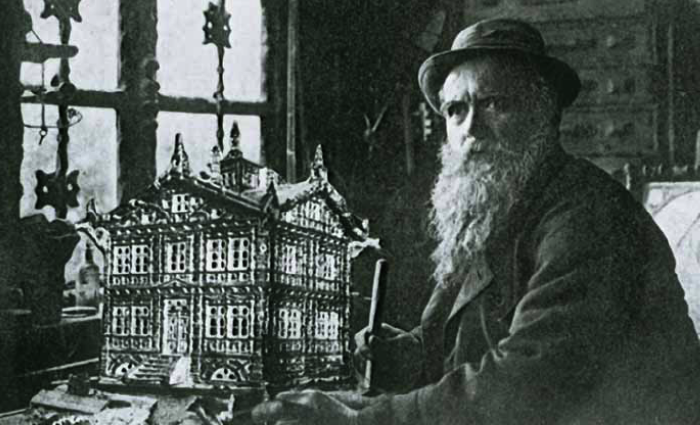
Karl Junker with a model of the Junker house, around 1900

Karl Friedrich Junker (30 August 1850 – 24 or 25 January 1912) was a German painter, sculptor and architect active in Lemgo and Lippe.

== Life ==
Karl Junker attended school in Lemgo from 1857 to 1864. From 1865–1866 to 1868–1869 he was trained as a carpenter by Wilhelm Stapperfenne. Junker lived in Hamburg, where he probably worked and studied as a carpenter or cabinetmaker from 1869 to 1871. From there he left for Munich, where he attended the Königliche Kunstgewerbeschule from 1873 to 1875 and enrolled in the Academy of Fine Arts on 17 April 1875.

Junker probably stayed in Italy between 1877–1878 and 1883. In 1877–1878 Karl Junker registered as a "painter from Munich" in the Casa Baldi in Olevano Romano. He made numerous drawings of sites in North and Central Italy. Since August 1883 the presence of Junker was again recorded in Lemgo. Records show that Junker lived in Lemgo from at least from 1887 and he applied on 27 October 1889 for the construction of the Junker house, the completion of which he announced on 9 March 1891.

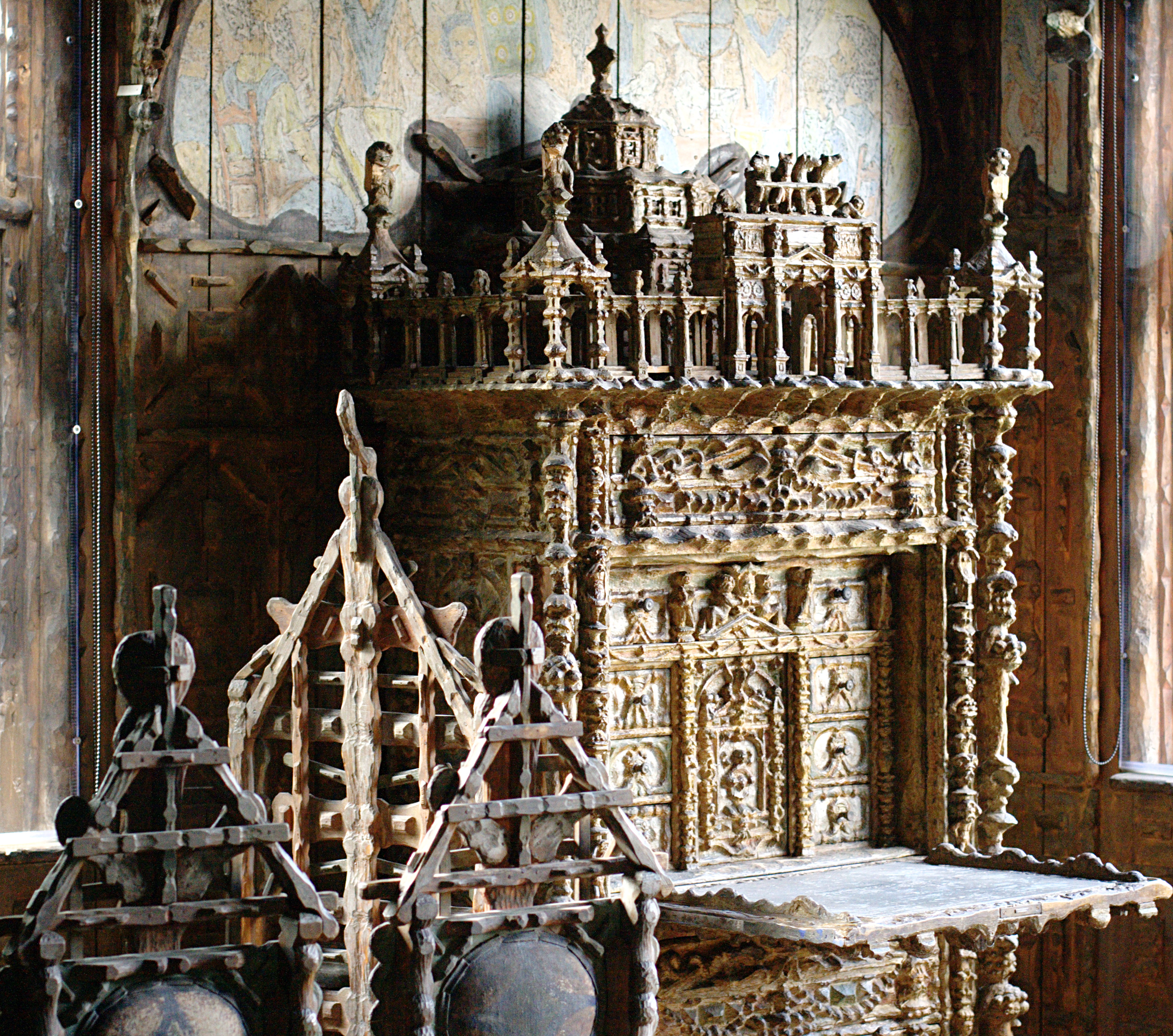
Secretary desk in the Junkerhaus

Between the end of 1889 and May 1893, Junker built a house in Lemgo according to his own plans, which he himself called "Junkerhaus" and which is now partly open to the public. For his paintings and sculptures, the Museum Junkerhaus that is connected to the back of his house was opened on 11 September 2004.

Already during his lifetime Karl Junker was regarded as a solitary and eccentric man. He died of pneumonia at the age of 61 in his hometown and was buried there on 29 January 1912. An unpublished biography can be viewed in the Lemgo City Archives.

== Works ==
Most of Karl Junker's preserved works date back to the years after 1893, and most of them do not bear a date, title or signature. Little is known about Junker's activities in the nearly two decades preceding his death. However, he left more than 150 picture frames on the walls and ceilings of the Junkerhaus as well as the large number of pictures on wood or canvas.

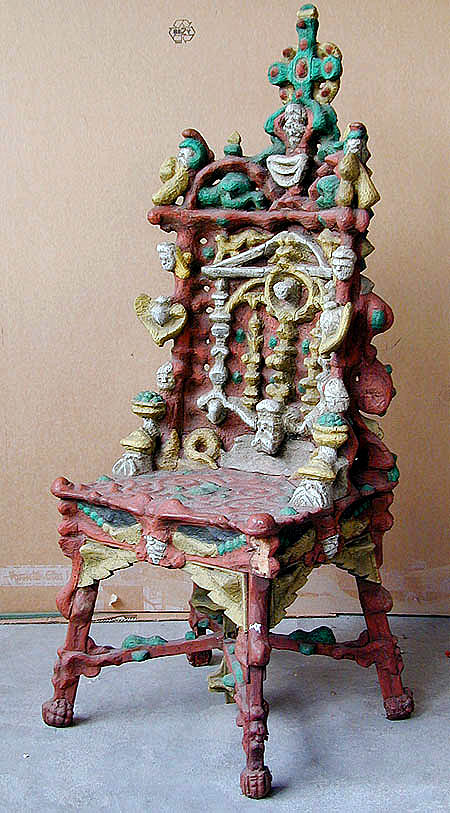
Chair from Karl Junker

In the year following his death, 55 works by Junker – 26 paintings, eleven watercolours, 13 drawings and sketches as well as five carvings and furniture – were shown in a separate section of the 6th collective exhibition of the Neue Secession artists' group in Berlin. Curt Glaser commented in 1914: "Nevertheless, for Karl Junker's sake alone, it is worth visiting the exhibition of the Neue Sezession, which, with this discovery, has secured itself an attraction that its larger sister (the exhibition in the Freie Sezession Berlin) lacks". An unknown author in the 1926 volume of Thieme und Becker's Künstlerlexikon called the exhibition "the rather unsuccessful attempt at artistic rehabilitation".

In 1998 a one-day symposium with the title "Art and Architecture in Lippe around 1900: Karl Junker and the Junkerhaus" took place in Lemgo.

== Bibliography ==
- Götz J. Pfeiffer: „Deine Seele …, die sich in den Irrgängen phantastischer Paläste zurechtfand“. Kunsthistorische Studie mit Katalog zu 99 Wand- und Decken-Bildfeldern in sechs Räumen des Junkerhauses in Lemgo sowie zu einem Leinwandgemälde und drei Tafelbildern Karl Junkers (1850–1912), Frankfurt 2007.
- Monika Jagfeld: "Nach hundert Jahren wird man erkennen, was ich war". Eine Holzskulptur von Karl Junker (1850–1912). In: Wahnsinn sammeln. Outsider Art aus der Sammlung Dammann. Heidelberg 2006, p. 168–173.
- Götz J. Pfeiffer: Orpheus in der Unterwelt bei Karl Junker (1850–1912). Der Künstler und seine Werke zwischen Fatum und Fama. In: Rosenland. II, 2005, p. 19–37.
- Götz J. Pfeiffer: "… lohnt es sich allein um Karl Junkers willen …". Kunsthistorische Studie zu 53 Wand- und Decken-Bildfeldern des Junkerhauses, zu 16 Tafelbildern und zu einem Leinwandgemälde des Lemgoer Künstlers Karl Junker, Berlin 2002.
- Peter Gorsen: Karl Junker, 1850–1912. Das Haus in Lemgo. In: Ingried Brugger, Peter Gorsen, Klaus Albrecht Schröder (Hrsg.): Kunst & Wahn. Köln 1997, p. 283–289.
- Jan Ochalski: Karl Junker (1850–1912): Biographie eines Universalkünstlers unter Berücksichtigung der Malerei. PhD Thesis, Bochum 1995.
- Klaus Peter Schumann: Karl Junker – ein Lemgoer Künstler zwischen Impressionismus, Jugendstil und Expressionismus. In: Peter Johanek, Herbert Stöwer (Hrsg.): 800 Jahre Lemgo. Aspekte der Stadtgeschichte. (= Beiträge zur Geschichte der Stadt Lemgo. Band 2). Lemgo 1980, p. 509–537.
- Wilhelm Salber: Drehfiguren. Karl Junker. Maler, Architekt, Bildhauer. Selbstverlag, Lemgo 1978.
- Neue Secession. Sechste Ausstellung. Neue Galerie. Ausstellungskatalog. Berlin W. Lennéstr. 6a, o. O. (Berlin), o. J. (1913).
