= Young Mans Butte =

Summit in Stark County, North Dakota, United States

Coordinates: 46°52′17″N 102°14′39″W

Young Mans Butte is a summit in Stark County, North Dakota, in the United States. With an elevation of 2,720 feet (830 m), Young Mans Butte is the 68th highest summit in the state of North Dakota.

Young Mans Butte was named from an incident when a group of young Arikara men became separated at this butte, and were not seen again.
