= Youngman (surname) =

Youngman is an English-language last name which is derived from Old English geong mann "young man" via Middle English yunge man "young servant" and originally was the rank of a servant in a noble household.

Notable people with the surname include:

- Annie Marie Youngman (1860–1919), British painter
- Colin Irving Youngman (born 1958), English author
- Hennessy Youngman, persona invented and performed by Jayson Musson
- Henny Youngman (1906–1998), American comedian and violinist
- Henry Youngman (1865–1936), professional baseball player
- Jerome T. Youngman (born 1951), American rock singer, songwriter and record producer
- Joseph Youngman (born 1982), American music producer
- Kate Youngman (1841–1910), American missionary
- Nan Youngman (1906–1995), English painter and educationalist
- Stuart Youngman (born 1965), English former footballer
- William S. Youngman (1872–1934), American politician
