= Junker Jørgensen =

Danish cyclist

Personal information
- Born: 17 May 1946 Roskilde, Denmark
- Died: 8 January 1989 (aged 42) Roskilde, Denmark

Cycling career
- Sport: Cycling

Junker Jørgensen (17 May 1946 – 8 January 1989) was a Danish cyclist. He competed in the team time trial at the 1972 Summer Olympics.
