= Juncker =

Juncker is a surname. Notable people with the surname include:

- Juncker (singer), full name Christian Juncker, Danish singer and songwriter
- Bente Juncker, Danish politician
- Henry Damian Juncker (1809–1868), French-born Roman Catholic prelate and first Bishop of Alton, Illinois
- Jean-Claude Juncker, Luxembourgish politician, Prime Minister of Luxembourg (1995–2013) and President of the European Commission (2014 –2019)

== See also ==
- Junker
- Junkers
- Jucker (surname)
