= Carl F. Bucherer =

Swiss luxury watch company

- Type: AG
- Industry: Watch manufacturing
- Founded: 1867
- Founder: Carl F. Bucherer
- Headquarters: Lucerne, Switzerland
- Owner: Bucherer AG
- Number of employees: ≈200
- Website: www.carl-f-bucherer.com

Carl F. Bucherer was a Swiss watch company based in Lucerne, Switzerland, which manufactured luxury men's and women's mechanical watches. From its founding in 1888 until its sale in 2023, the company was wholly owned by the Bucherer family, making it one of the oldest luxury Swiss watchmakers continuously held by the founding family. The company was run by the original family's third generation, with Jörg G. Bucherer serving as chairman of the board.

In August 2023, Bucherer AG was bought by Rolex. In February 2025, Rolex CEO Jean-Frédéric Dufour decided to discontinue the brand due its failure to turn a profit.

The watch models of Carl F. Bucherer can be distinguished by certain functions including the chronograph, flyback, tachymeter, tourbillon as well as indicators and displays such as big date and day, power reserve, 24 hours, moon phases, three time zones, calendar, and perpetual calendar.

== History ==
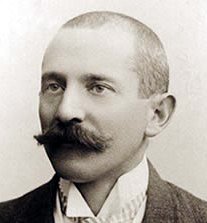
Carl Friedrich Bucherer, founder of the Swiss watch manufacturer.

In 1888, Carl Friedrich Bucherer established his first boutique selling watches and jewelry in Lucerne, Switzerland. In 1919, Carl Friedrich Bucherer launched his first ladies’ watch collection in the art deco style. He was one of the first watchmakers to adopt the watch strap, which at the time was still a revolutionary concept. By 1948, the company was focusing on sporty chronographs that prominently displayed the current date.

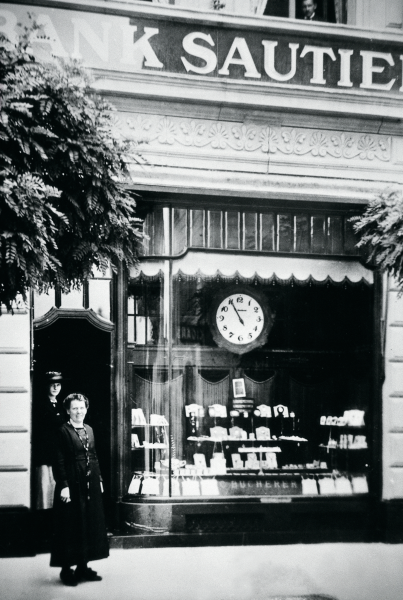
Carl Friedrich Bucherer's first boutique in Lucerne, Switzerland.

By 1968, Carl F. Bucherer had manufactured around 15,000 high-precision, certified chronometers, making the company one of the top three Swiss producers of these specialized timepieces. In 1969, the company became part of a Swiss consortium for the development and production of the first quartz movement for wristwatches, the Beta 21.

In 1976, Jörg G. Bucherer, the third generation of the family, took over the company. In 2001, the Carl F. Bucherer brand was repositioned and the company launched the Patravi watch collection. In 2005, the company filed a patent for the monopusher mechanism of the Patravi TravelTec watch, which permits the parallel display of three time zones.

In 2007, Carl F. Bucherer acquired Téchniques Horlogères Appliquées of Sainte-Croix, Switzerland and incorporated it into the company as Carl F. Bucherer Technologies. The acquisition enabled the company to research, develop, and produce its own manufacture movements and modules for additional functions. This led in the following year to the company's launch of the CFB A1000 manufacture movement, which features a weighted geared ring peripherally mounted power source. In 2014, the Manero PowerReserve became the first Carl F. Bucherer model to receive a unique laser signature in order to ensure product authenticity and quality. From that year, all models have been equipped with this technology. In 2018 Bucherer acquired Tourneau LLC.

In 2025 news broke that the owner Rolex is shutting down the Carl F. Bucherer brand.

== Production ==
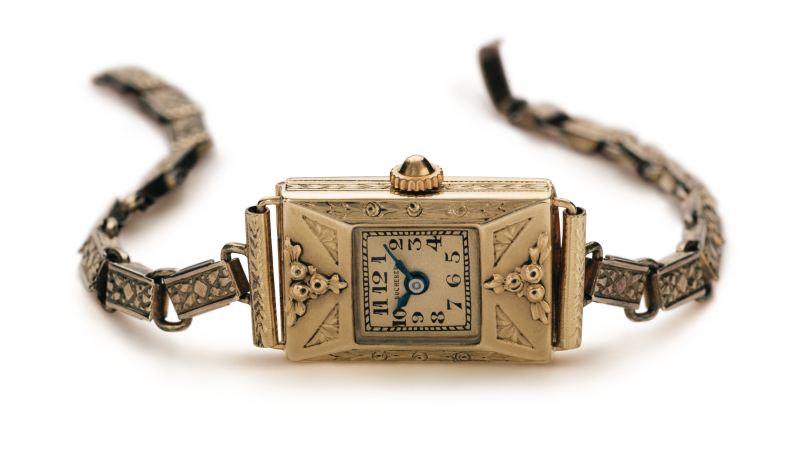
The first Carl F. Bucherer ladies' wristwatch, from 1919.

In order to increase its production capacity, Carl F. Bucherer moved its production workshops from Nidau to a larger production site in Lengnau, Bern in 2002. In 2015, Carl F. Bucherer announced that its manufacturing would be consolidated to a new factory in Lengnau in order to optimize production processes and its value-added chain, as well as to increase the scope of vertical manufacturing.

The company currently sells about 67,000 watches a year (around 67% men, 41% women). The price range varies between CHF 5,000 and CHF 30,000 with some exception over CHF 400,000. The world market is divided between Europe with 67%, Asia also 40% and rest of the world, including US market with 20%.

== In-house manufacture movement ==
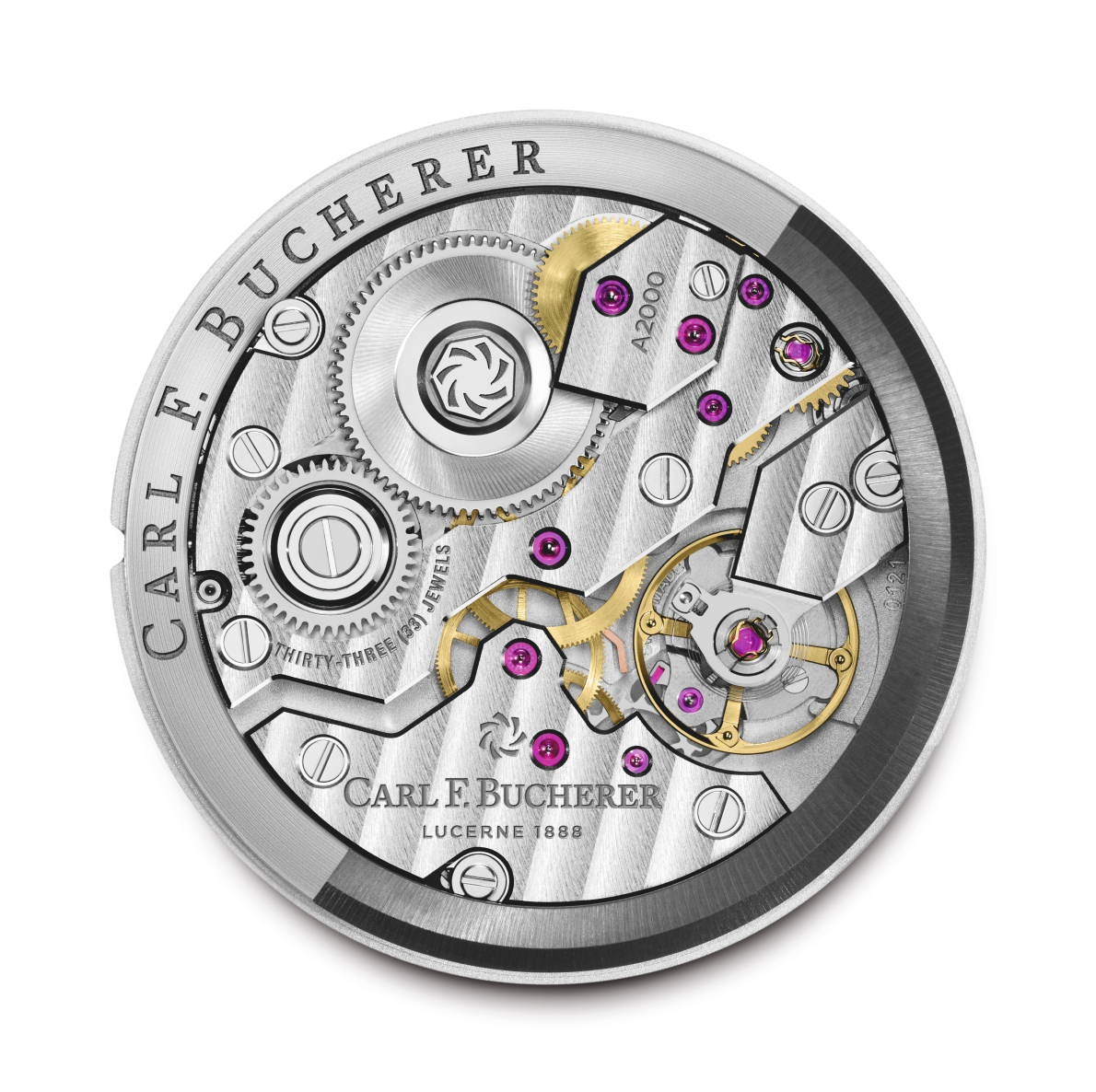
The CFB A2000 caliber manufacture movement.

The CFB A1000 caliber has the first reliably functioning automatic mechanical watch movement with a peripherally mounted power source. A geared ring and a rotating unbalance mass segment made of tungsten encircles the entire mechanism, rotating on carbon rollers whenever the watch moves. A system of clutch wheels captures power. Discarding a centrally mounted rotor means thinner watches and an ultradense weight swinging around a greater radius means a better chance of achieving a greater power reserve with the same amount of arm movement. The peripheral rotor provides power when turning in either direction and allows for full visual display of the movement. The A1000 movement includes the patented "Dynamic Shock Absorption" (DSA) system for effective shock absorption.

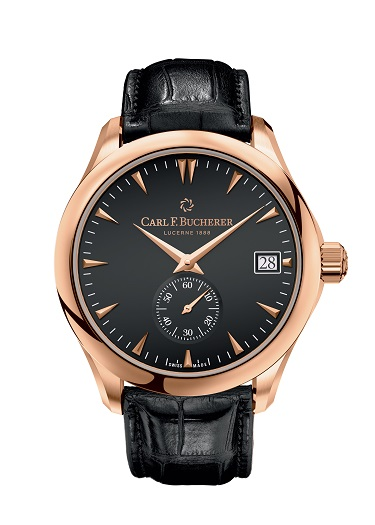
The 2016 Manero Peripheral model, marking the launch of the CFB A2000 movement family.

At BaselWorld 2016, Carl F. Bucherer introduced the CFB A2000 manufacture movement. The A2000 retains the A1000 caliber's signature winding mechanism, but is enhanced from a 3 Hz to a 4 Hz beat rate "for increased precision and a newly free-sprung balance for increased resistance to shock-induced timing deviation." The A2000 has the COSC Swiss Chronometer certification to attest to its high-level performance.

Carl F. Bucherer's new Manero Peripheral model, also introduced at BaselWorld 2016, is driven by the CFB A2000-based CFB A2050 caliber. This watch marks the launch of the CFB A2000 movement family. The new Manero Flyback model features the CFB 1970 caliber, "which is controlled by a gearwheel and also provides a flyback function, allowing multiple time intervals to be measured in quick succession."

In 2018, Carl F. Bucherer launched its CFB T3000 manufacturer caliber, which implemented - in addition to the peripheral rotor - a tourbillon that appears to float. Unlike traditional tourbillons, it is neither mounted in the movement's main plate nor in an overlying bridge. Instead, the shockproof tourbillon cage actually sits securely in position, supported peripherally by three ceramic ball bearings. Invisible, these bearings are said to ensure precise guidance and smooth operation. The tourbillon also has a stop-seconds function. The movement was first introduced in the Manero Tourbillon DoublePeripheral.

2021 saw the launch of Carl F. Bucherer's Manero Minute Repeater Symphony, a watch which premiered the CFB MR3000 manufacture caliber, an automatic movement that features three patented peripheral technologies. Along with the winding system with the peripheral rotor and the "floating tourbillon", it is also equipped with a minute repeater complication with a peripherally mounted regulator.

== Authentication ==
As of 2014, the company's manufacture movements have been protected against counterfeiting by special laser technology. Developed by the Swiss company Mimotec SA, the CLR-LIGA process imprints a unique signature on the surface of the watch movement using diffractive nano-structuring that can then only be authenticated with a specialized laser scanning device.

== Collections ==
Carl F. Bucherer watches are divided into five core collections:

- Patravi.
- Manero.
- Heritage
- Adamavi (luxury watches).
- Pathos (luxury watches for women).
- Alacria (jewelry watches for women).

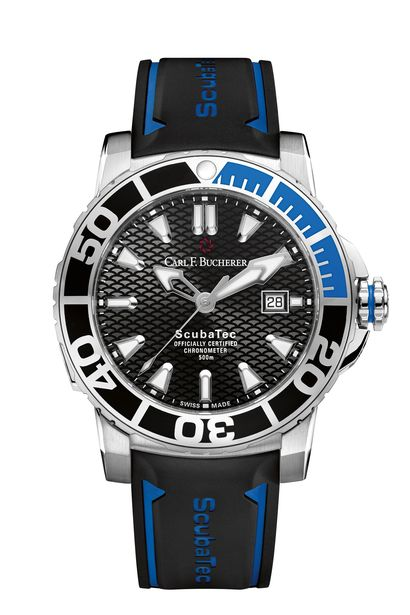
The Patravi ScubaTec diver's watch.

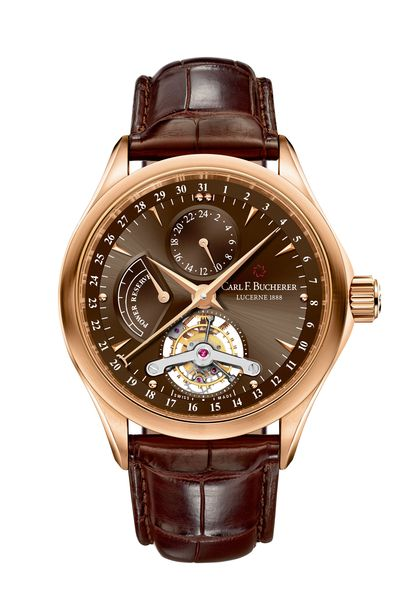
The Manero Tourbillon Limited Edition.

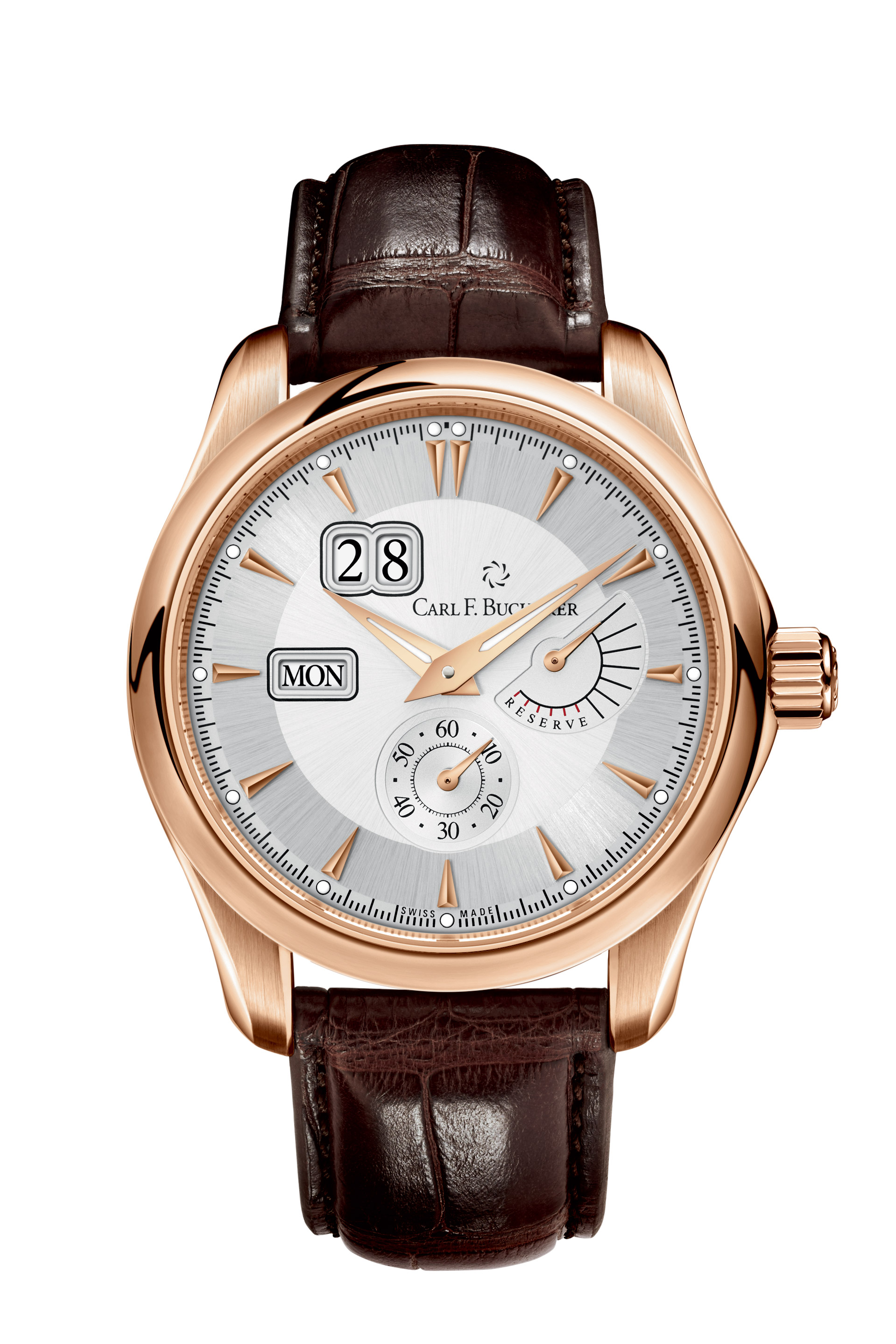
The Manero PowerReserve.

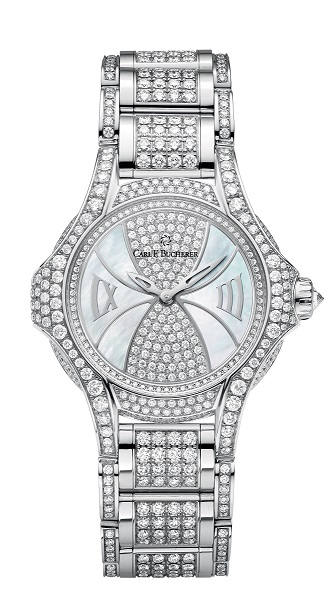
The Pathos Desire.

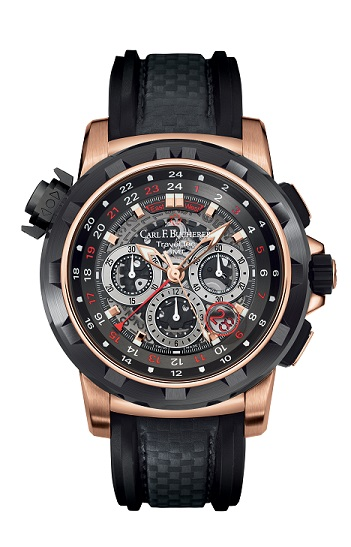
The Patravi TravelTec FourX Limited Edition

== 125th anniversary ==
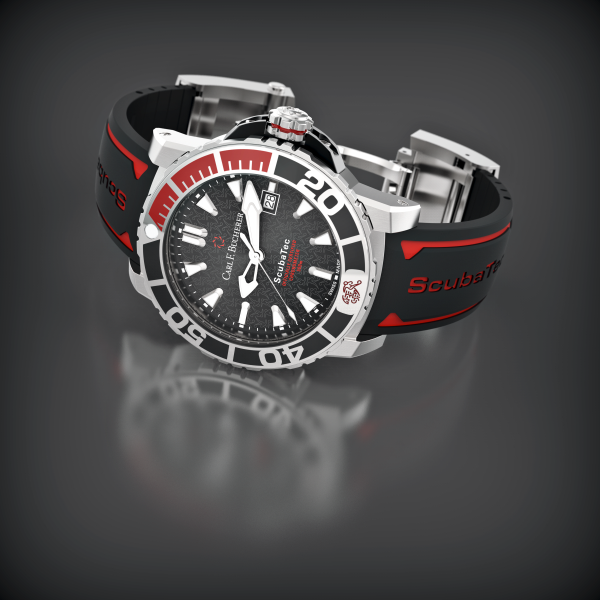
The Patravi ScubaTec SFV Special Edition.

In 2013, Carl F. Bucherer celebrated its 125th anniversary with an international roadshow presenting over 200 historical watches and the history of the company. The company also released four limited edition watches: the Manero MoonPhase, Manero Tourbillon, Alacria RoyalRose, and the Patravi TravelTec FourX. A jubilee volume, "125 Years' Swiss History of Time," further commemorated the history of the company.

== Partnership with Swiss Football Association ==
In 2014, Carl F. Bucherer partnered with the Swiss National Football Association, providing each member of the Swiss national football team a Patravi ScubaTec SFV Special Edition watch ahead of that year's World Cup. The logo of the Swiss Football Association is at 6 o'clock on the bezel. The back case of each watch has an engraving of the individual player's name.

As of 1 July 2016, Carl F. Bucherer is the "Official Timekeeper" for the Swiss national football teams for a period of four years. As part of this partnership, Swiss national players are wearing the exclusive Patravi ScubaTec SFV timepiece. The press conference announcing the partnership was attended by Stephan Lichtsteiner, captain of the Swiss national team, and star player Granit Xhaka.

== In popular culture ==
In Deadpool 2 the character Cable, a time-travelling soldier played by Josh Brolin, uses a time machine on his wrist; close-ups of the device it is inscribed with the Carl F. Bucherer name and logo suggesting that, far in the future where Cable originates, the watchmaker produces wearable time pieces that can manipulate time itself.

Keanu Reeves wears a Carl F. Bucherer Manero AutoDate watch in John Wick (2014) and John Wick: Chapter 2 (2017). In John Wick: Chapter 3 – Parabellum (2019), Ian McShane wears a Carl F. Bucherer Manero AutoDate with black dial.

A Carl F. Bucherer watch is used in the film Atomic Blonde (2017). The film is set in the early 1990s just before the fall of the Berlin Wall. Inside the Carl F. Bucherer watch is the uncoded list of secret agents.

In the third episode of the second season of the TV series Succession, the character Frank is given a Carl F. Bucherer watch with an inscription on the back by Logan Roy.
