= Omegamatic =

Omegamatic may refer to:

- The Omegamatic, fictional Shikadi-controlled space station in Commander Keen games
- Omega Seamaster Omegamatic, watch
