= Seamaster =

Seamaster may refer to:

- the Martin P6M SeaMaster flying boat
- the Omega Seamaster wristwatch
- the yacht aboard which noted New Zealand sailor Peter Blake was killed by pirates.
- a mini-submarine craft for deep diving in the ocean, Seamaster 2 is a red unit, there is also a yellow unit, name unknown at present.
