= Automatic quartz =

Type of watch movement

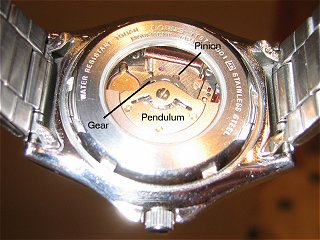
Lorus (a Seiko brand) watch with glass back, showing clearly the swinging pendulum and meshing gear and pinion of the Seiko Kinetic movement

Seiko SKA531P1 Kinetic, using a 5M62 caliber Kinetic movement

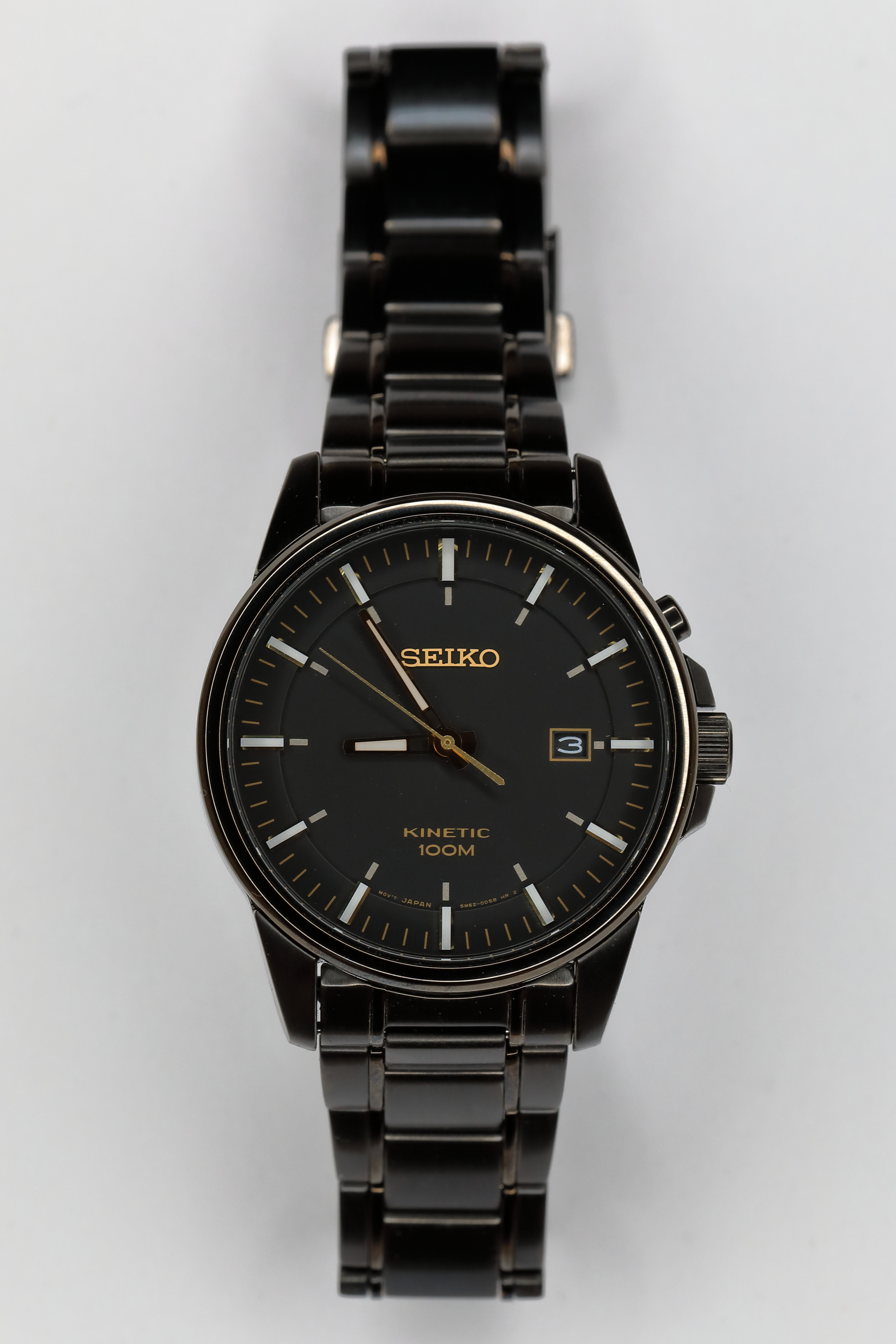
Front

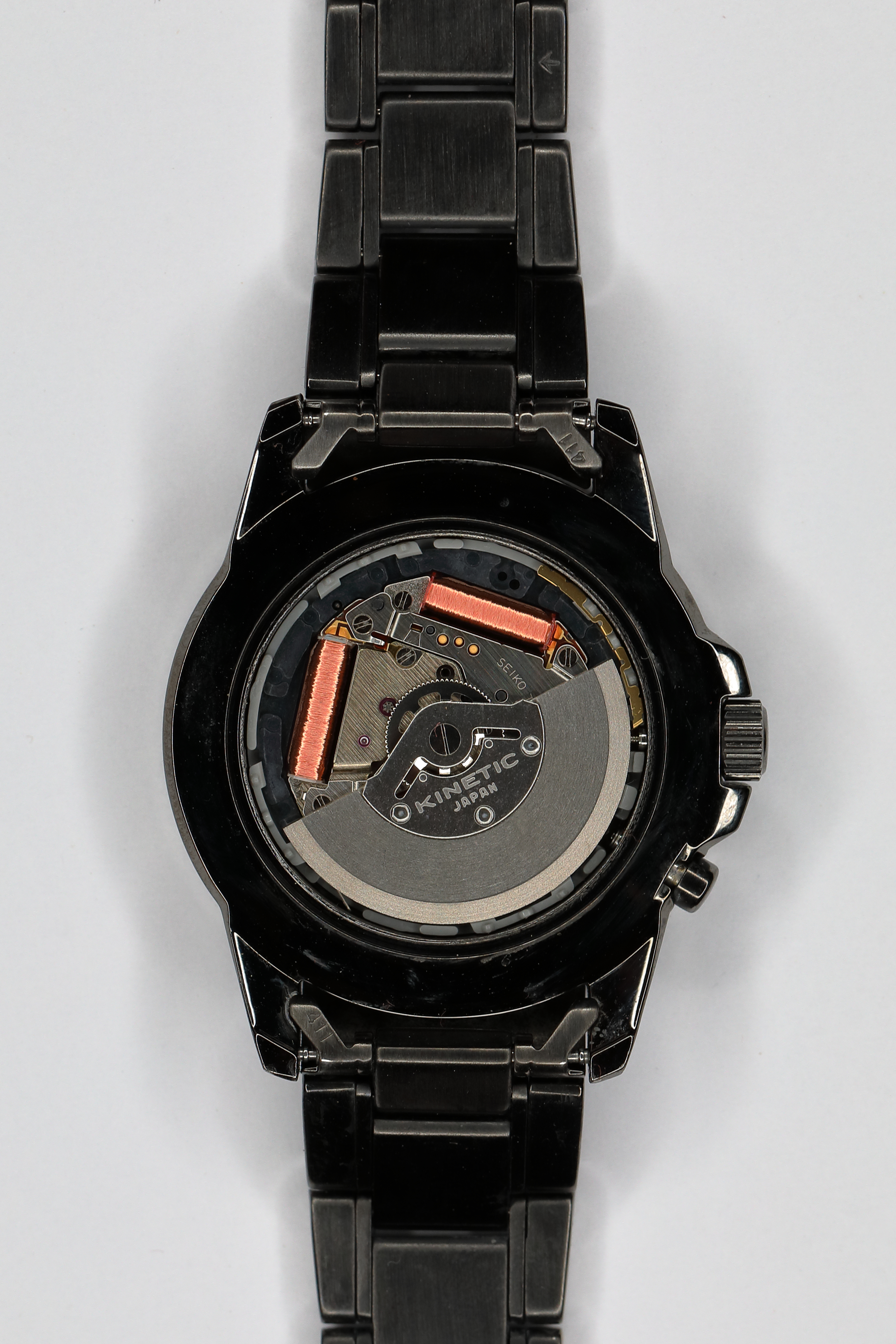
Backsite, without watch caseback

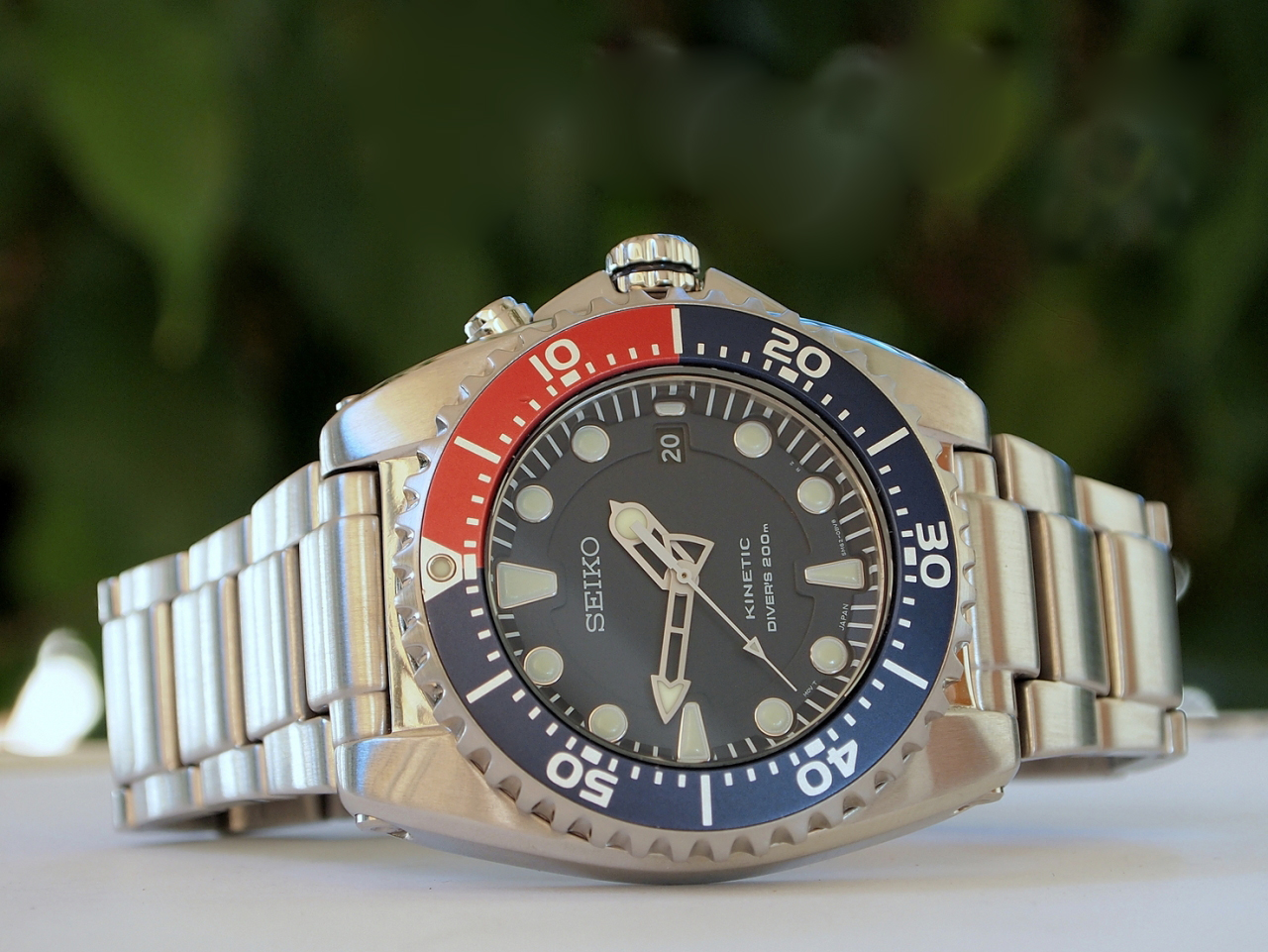
Seiko SKA369P1 Kinetic Diver's 200 m (tool watch suitable for scuba diving) using a 5M62 caliber Kinetic movement.

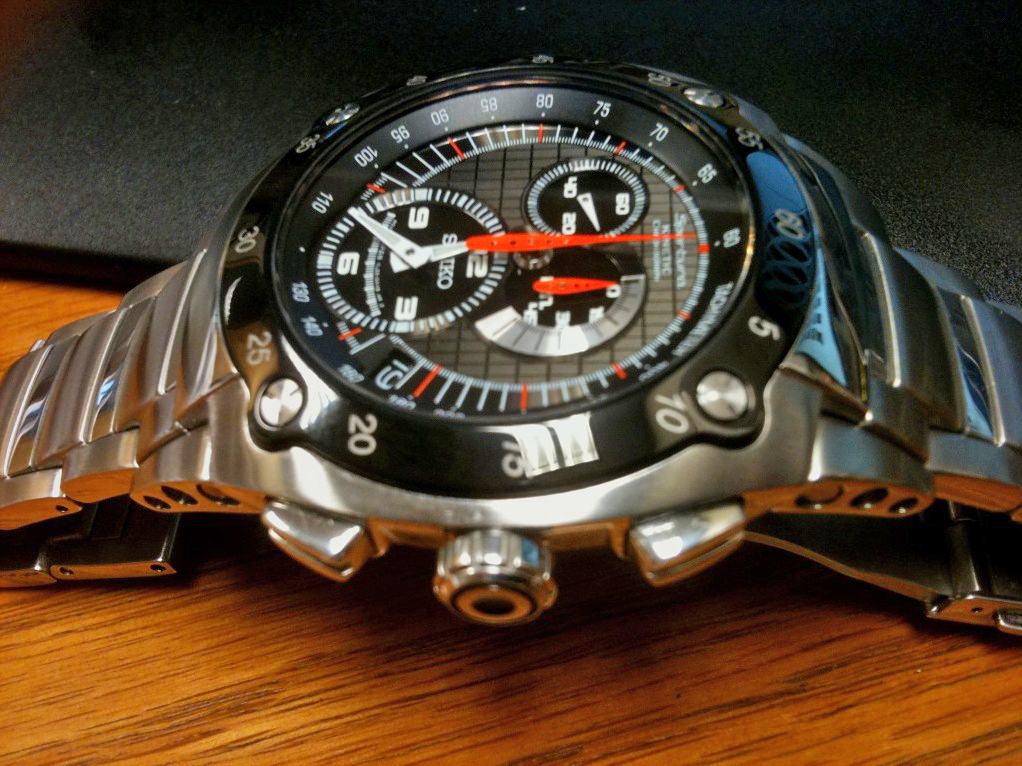
Seiko SNL043 Kinetic Chronograph using a 7L22 caliber Kinetic movement with flyback chronograph.

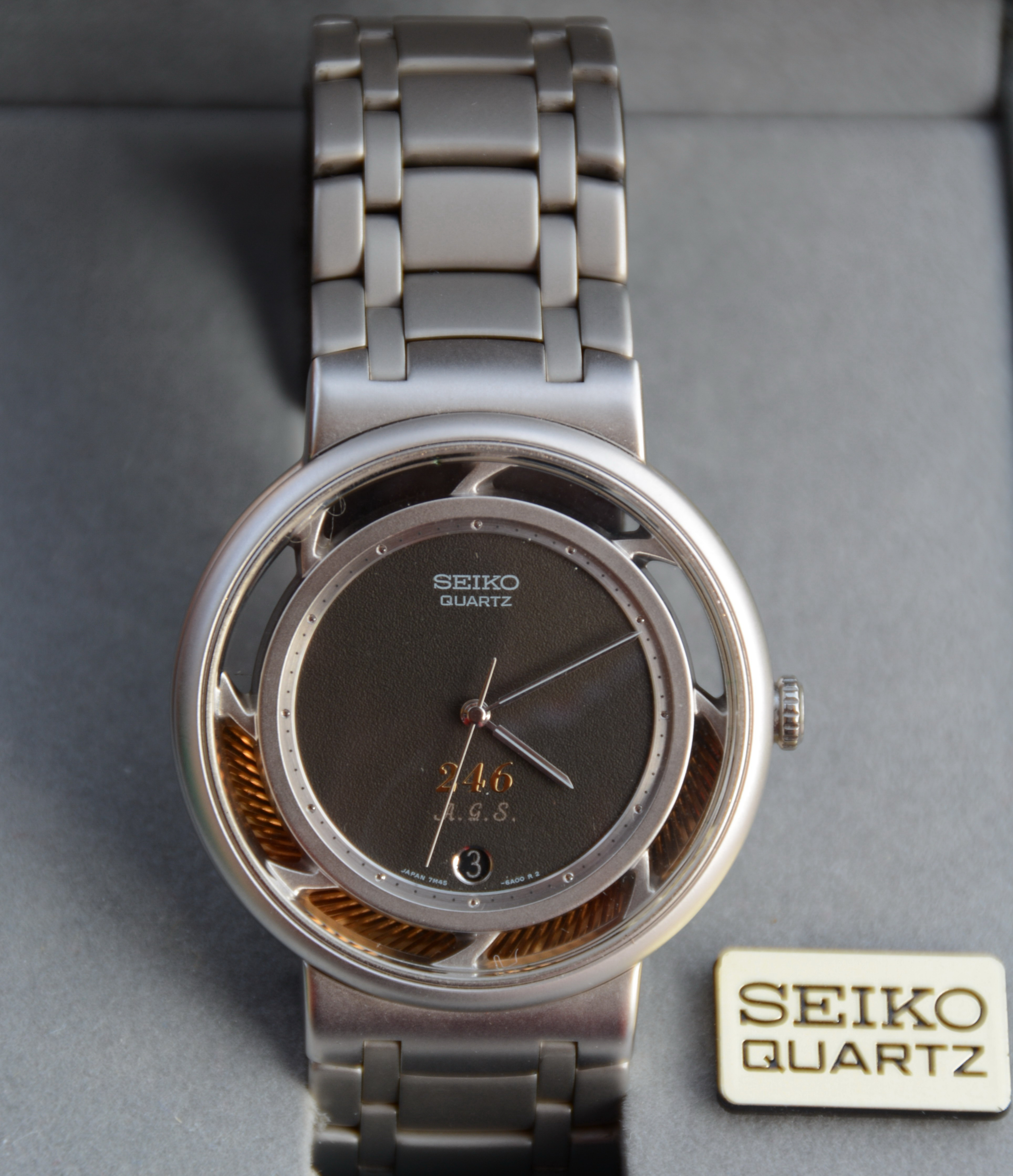
'Seiko Quartz Automatic Generating System' (A.G.S. = early Kinetic), Perpetuum Nobile (produced in 1989), Cal. 7M45, No. 246 of 700

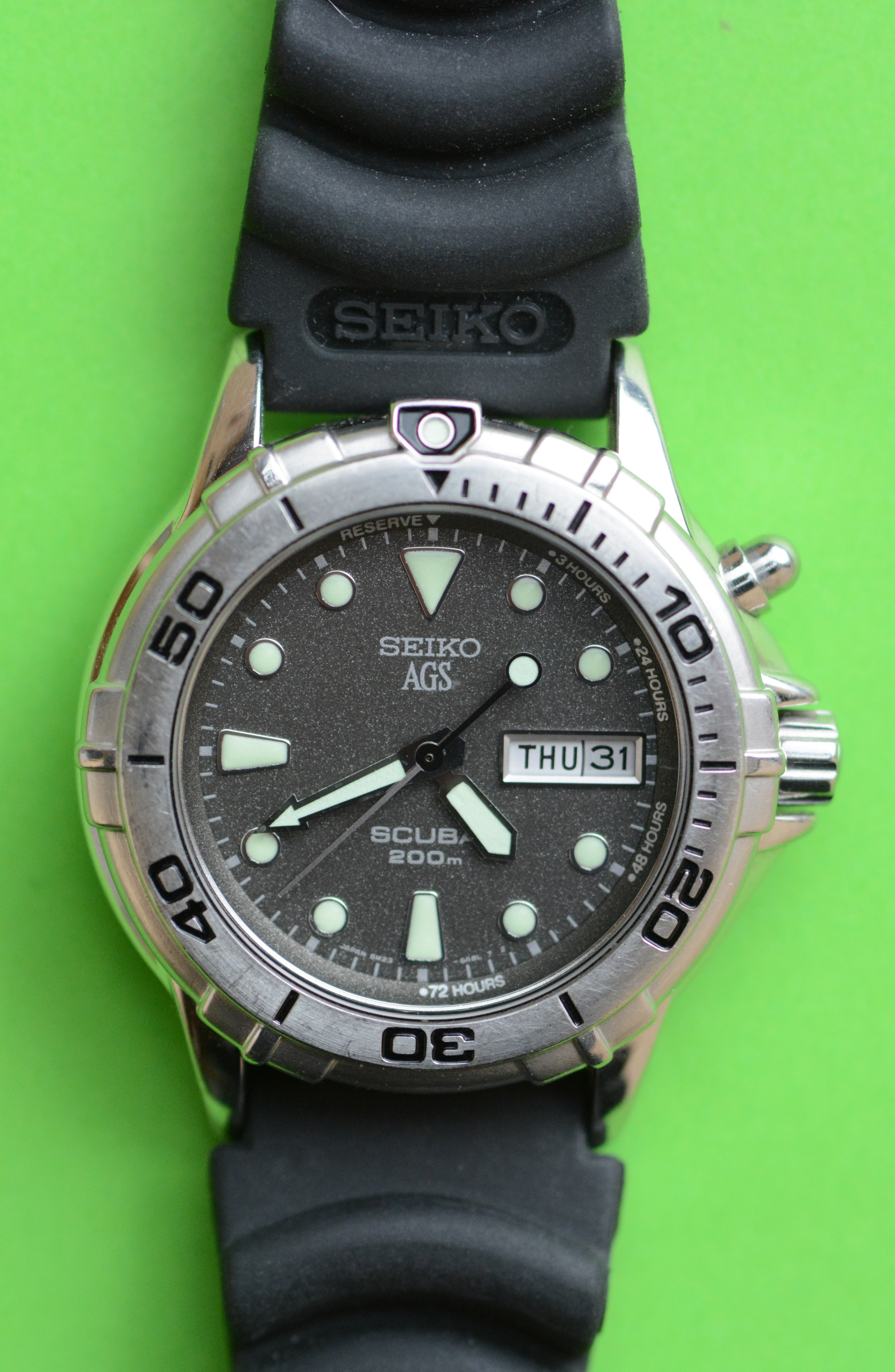
Seiko AGS SCUBA Diver 200m 5M23-6A60, 1993

Automatic quartz is a collective term describing watch movements that combine a self-winding rotor mechanism (as used in automatic mechanical watches) to generate electricity with a piezoelectric quartz crystal as its timing element. Such movements aim to provide the advantages of quartz without the inconvenience and environmental impact of batteries. Several manufacturers employ this technique.

== Mode of operation ==
A rotating pendulum inside the case is attached to a relatively large gear which meshes with a very small pinion. As the wearer moves, the pendulum turns and spins the pinion at a very high speed - up to 100,000 rpm. This is coupled to a miniature electrical generator which charges a storage device which is a capacitor(s) or a rechargeable battery. A typical full charge will last between two weeks and six months.

== Applications ==
=== Seiko ===
Japanese company Seiko pioneered the technique which it unveiled at the Baselworld 1986 trade show under the trial name AGM. The first such watch was released in Germany in January 1988 and April of the same year in Japan (under the name Auto-Quartz). The watches had an average monthly rate of ±15 sec and provided 75 hours of continuous operation when fully powered. Early automatic quartz movements were called AGS (Automatic Generating System).

In 1991 the company introduced the Kinetic brand name.

Today Seiko offers a wide range of watches with various Kinetic movements. The top of the line is the caliber 9T82, included in Sportura (international brand) and PROSPEX (only marketed in Japan) Collection. It is sold in limited volume at a price range of about US$3000 which makes it one of the most expensive automatic quartz watches. Kinetic technology has also been used in some of Seiko's Pulsar and Lorus watches. As of 2007, Seiko has sold more than eight million automatic quartz watches.

The different calibres of Kinetic watches currently are relatively large and heavy, weighing in at 1/3 of a pound (150 grams) or more on many models. Therefore, most Seiko Kinetic watches are only available in a men's size.

Movement calibers：

- 1M20
- 3M21 3M22
- 3M62
- 4M21
- 4M71
- 5D22 5D44 (Direct Drive)
- 5D88 (Direct Drive Moonphase)
- 5J21 5J22 (Auto Relay)
- 5J32 (Auto Relay)
- 5M22 5M23 5M25
- 5M42 5M43 5M45 5M47
- 5M54 (Retrograde Day Indicator)
- 5M62 5M63 5M65(GMT)
- 5M82 5M83 5M84 5M85
- 7D46 7D48 7D56 (Auto Relay, Perpetual Calendar)
- 7L22 (Flyback chronograph)
- 7M12 7M42
- 7M22 7M45
- 9T82 (Chronograph)
- YT57 YT58

=== ETA ===
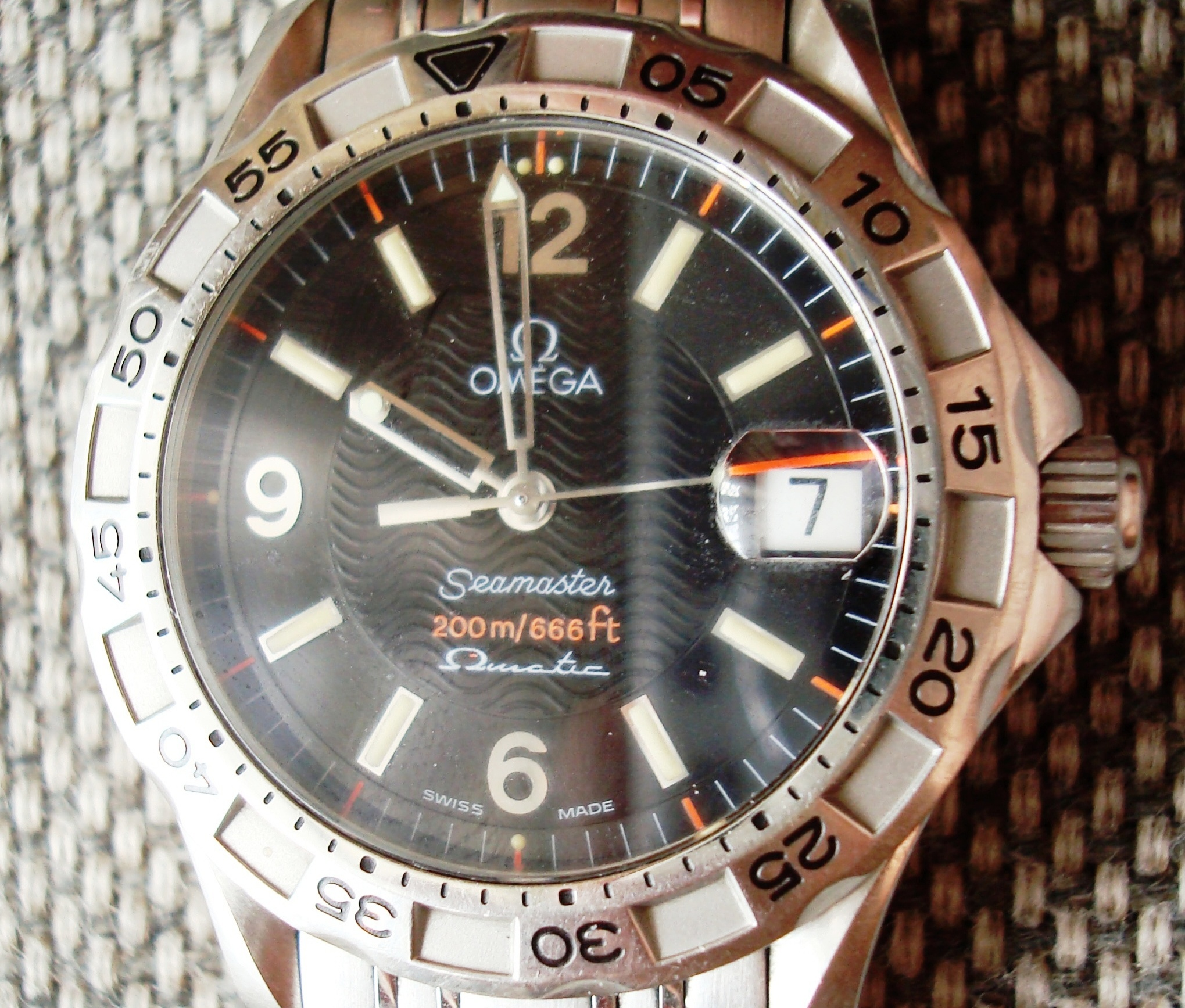
Omega Seamaster 200 Omegamatic. This watch uses Omega caliber 1400 (ETA 205.111 Rhodium plated).

Swiss company ETA SA, part of the Swatch group, made seven different automatic quartz movements, calling them Autoquartz. They were part of the premium Flatline series of movements and were sold to a variety of watch vendors, primarily European and American. High grade movements designed to last as long as their premium mechanical movements, they had between 15 and 53 jewels. Unlike most quartz watches, Autoquartz could be calibrated to increase their accuracy. Several vendors had their Autoquartz watches COSC certified. In 2006 to increase production of its highly demanded mechanical movements, Swatch discontinued supplying the Autoquartz line to customers (service and parts are still available). Then in 2009, possibly due to available production capacity or stocked parts, Tissot reintroduced the Autoquartz in its PRC200 dive watch. The Autoquartz movement used by Tissot is gold plated and carries the designation ETA 205.914.

Movement calibers:

- 204.901 (small 8.75 lignes used primarily in women's watches)
- 204.911 (replacement for the 204.901 upgrading from a capacitor to a rechargeable battery)
- 205.111 (discontinued and replaced by the 205.911 which upgraded from a capacitor to a rechargeable battery)
- 205.711 (15 jeweled movement used only by Swatch Watch for a variety of its fashion watches)
- 205.911 (the most commonly available movement having 17 jewels and often ordered in gold plating)
- 205.914 (no information available from ETA)
- 205.961 (a 205.911 with the addition of a GMT hand)
- 206.211 (a 205.911 fitted with a Dubois Depraz 2021 to make a chronograph. With 53 jewels the most jeweled quartz movement ever made)

Manufacturers who employ or employed ETA movements: Tissot, Rado in their Accustar line of watches, Longines, Swatch, Omega (Omega Seamaster Omega-matic), Dugena (K-Tech), Wenger (GST Field Terragraph Autoquartz), Hermès (Nomade), Roberge (Altaïr), Mido (Multifort), Bovet (Autoquartz calibre 11BQ01), Fortis (Spacematic Eco), Belair (Autoquartz), Franck Muller (Transamerica), HTO (Grand Voyager) and Cyma.

=== Citizen ===
Citizen, one of the world's largest watch manufacturers, also built an autoquartz-powered watch: the Eco-Drive Duo (released in December 1998). Novel to this watch was the use of both mechanical power as well as a solar cell. This model was an attempt to enter higher-priced markets (at a cost of around US$1000), but the technology failed to attract consumer interest and Citizen has since stopped making use of the unique movement. No other autoquartz powered watch from Citizen is known; all other Eco-Drive models only use solar power or thermal power.

=== Ventura ===
Ventura is a small Swiss watch manufacturer claiming to be "the World's only manufacturer of automatic digital watches". Their VEN_99 movement was the only watch to ever combine autoquartz and digital readout of time (LCD) in one package. Offered were three models: the Sparc rx, fx and px. In late 2006, the company started selling their movement with an incorporated alarm, another exclusive feature. All hardware is proprietary to Ventura.

In 2007 the company went into bankruptcy. Support was available from an independent entity. In 2011 the company re-emerged from bankruptcy and continued to sell its models, introducing the "2nd gen Micro-Generating-System" and marketing the watch (Sparc MGS) integrating it as the world's first and only digital-readout multi-function automatic quartz module. Unlike with other manufacturers the watch movement (VEN_10) and power source (MGS) are separate units, only linked by a single wire.

== Pricing ==
In spite of the relatively complex mechanical parts used, Seiko has positioned their kinetic watches to be medium-priced. Exceptions are kinetic with other complications such as chronograph movement 9T82, 7L22 and direct drive movements. ETA sold Autoquartz to a variety of Swiss manufacturers with pricing below $100 (Swatch) to multiple thousands (Omega, Baume et Mercier, et al.). Ventura prices its automatic quartz watches at around 2000-4000 Euro.

== See also ==
- Automatic watch
- Seiko Spring Drive
- Complication (horology)
- Jewel bearing
