= Omega Seamaster Omegamatic =

Automatic quartz watch

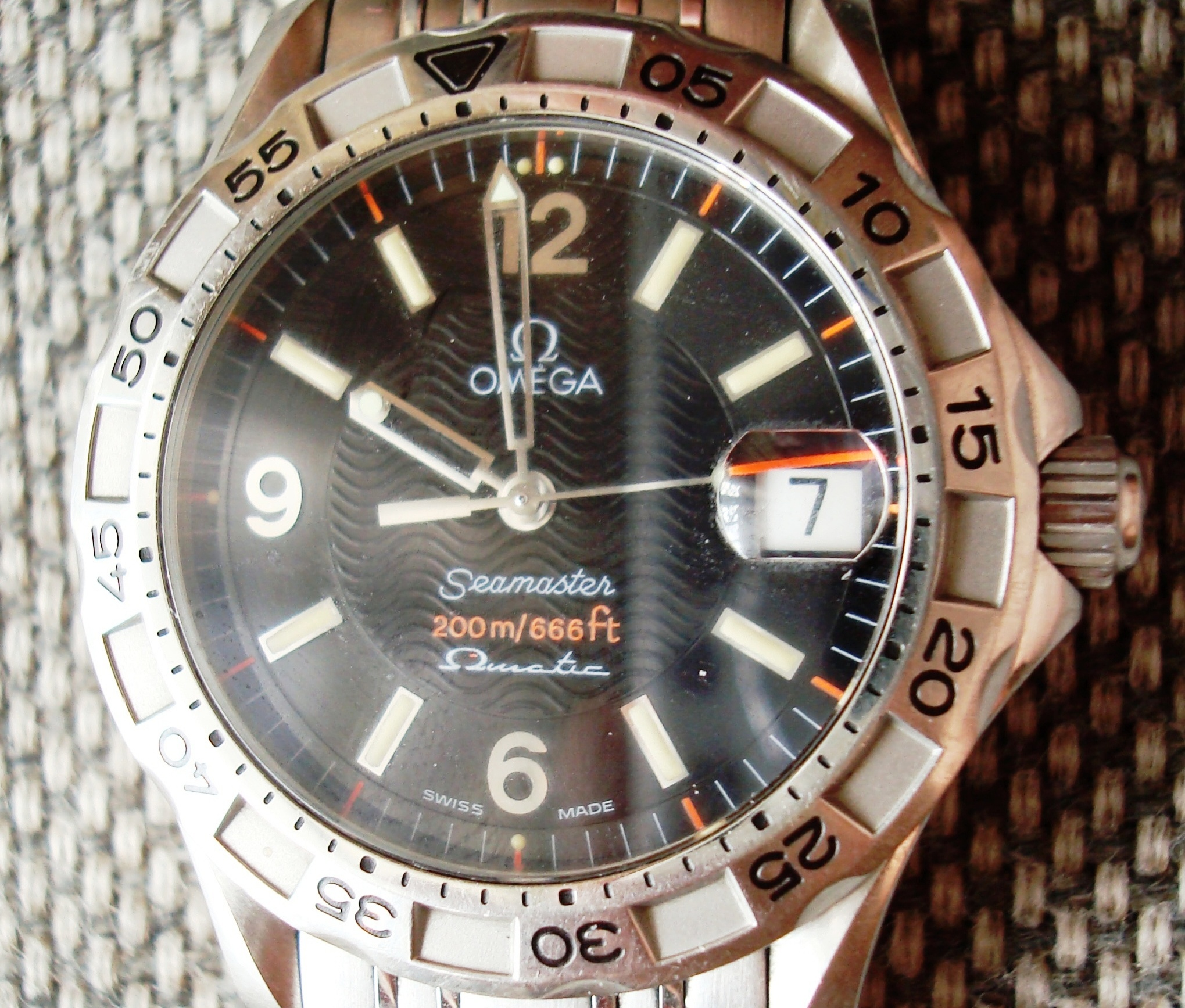
- The Omega Seamaster 200 Omegamatic with black dial
- Type: Automatic quartz
- Display: Analogue
- Introduced: 1997
- Movement: 205.111 caliber

The Omega Seamaster 200 Omegamatic is a midsize automatic quartz watch that Omega produced from 1997 until 2000. It has stainless steel case and bracelet (Bond style with gold Omega symbol clasp), screw-in crown and caseback, engraved with the Omega Hippocamp logo, 200 meters water resistant, unidirectional bezel, silver or black dial with orange accents, sapphire crystal (anti-reflective) with magnifying (cyclops) date window, case diameter 36mm, 2.4V capacitor (Renata GC920), rotor charging micro generator, quartz controlled stepper motor and quickset date function.

Omega reference: 2514.50.00 (black dial), 2516.50.00 (black dial) and 2514.30.00 (silver dial)

== Omegamatic caliber ==
Omegamatic used Omega caliber 1400 (ETA 205.111 Rhodium plated), 17 jewel autoquartz (not thermocompensated) movement with around 100 hours power reserve. This caliber has the option of manual winding to get the initial power to the capacitor. The mechanism alerts low power reserve by moving the seconds hand in four seconds intervals. The Omega 1400 caliber has a slow date change, which usually takes approximately 1.5 hours to change over.

Production of ETA 205.111 started in 1996. It was superseded by ETA 205.911, which replaced the capacitor with a rechargeable battery. Technical documents of 205.111 caliber could be retrieved from ETA customer service portal

Omega caliber 1400 is compatible with Panasonic MT920 (nominal voltage of 1.5V). Even though MT920 is designed to last 500 charge-discharge cycles, due to lack of official documentation, it is not clear how long this titanium lithium rechargeable battery will last when used in Omega 1400 caliber, however it is advised that these watches are serviced every 24 months and the batteries are replaced as a matter of course during Omega servicing.

== Operation of Omegamatic mechanisms ==
An oscillating weight (selfwinding mechanism in a traditional watch) transmits the mechanical energy to the micro generator through the microbarrel. The generator converts this mechanical energy into electrical energy and stores it in an accumulator (Capacitor for caliber 1400).

The accumulator supplies the integrated circuit with energy. Regulated by the quartz, the integrated circuit generates the control signals of the stepper motor which transmits these impulses to the gear train whose wheels and the connected hands are displaying hours, minutes, seconds and the date.

Caliber 1400 can charge the capacitor by turning the crown of the watch. It will require over 40 revolutions before the low power indicator stops.

== Model information and characteristics ==
- Arabic numerals at 12, 6 and 9, and magnified date window at 3.
- Water resistant to a maximum depth of 200 meters/666 ft.
- It has a unidirectional bezel that rotates anti-clockwise with "0-60" scale. It is useful for any kind of measures, especially diving times.
- The black dial version has silver numbers with orange markers. It also has silver color skeleton hands. The silver dial version has black skeleton hands.
- The Omega Seamaster 200 Omegamatic uses a screw-down crown for a tight water seal.
- This watch has a screw-in back. It has a series of five holes/notches evenly placed around the back. These are the indentations for the screw-back case opener tool to grip the back piece open and close it.
- The bracelet is 18mm wide and it is made of solid links, therefore not prone to stretching over time. This kind of bracelet is one of the most difficult to add or remove links
- There is at least one known special edition of the Seamaster 200 Omegamatic. There were 1997 units produced in a case that resembled a diver's tank.

== See also ==
- Automatic quartz
- Diving watch
- Omega Seamaster
