= John Harwood (watchmaker) =

British watchmaker

John Harwood (1893–1964) was a British watchmaker who invented the first self-winding wristwatch.

== Early life ==
Harwood was born in Bolton, Lancashire. During World War I he served as an armoury staff sergeant, developing an automatic pistol and a screwdriver whose blade turned on impact.

== Career ==
After the war he served a watchmaking apprenticeship with Hirst Brothers and Co of Oldham. In 1922 he moved to the Isle of Man to set up his own watch repair business.

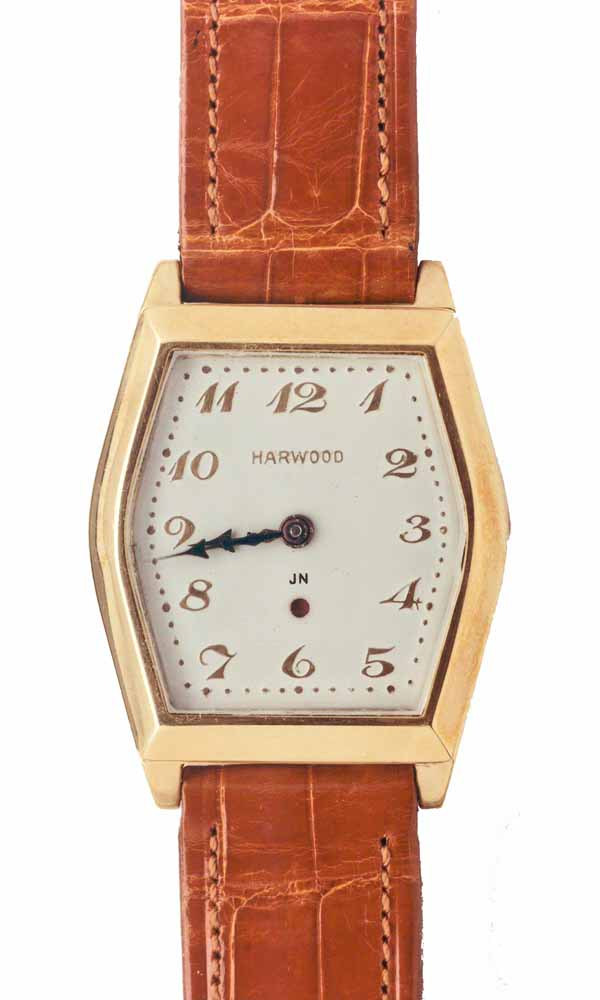
Harwood self-winding watch.

In 1923, supported by a local businessman, he developed a self-winding wristwatch and applied for a patent in Switzerland, which was granted in September, 1924. His design ensured that the watch could be hermetically sealed against the ingress of water or dust. The hands could be reset by a rotating bezel. After four years, supported by funds from two Manchester brothers, Louis and Philip Alexander, he persuaded Swiss watch manufacturers Anton Schild S.A. and Walter Vogt of Fortis to manufacture the design. Blancpain also made them under licence in 1928 for sale in France and the Perpetual Self-Winding Watch Company manufactured them for sale in North America. The watches were first shown at the Basel Fair in 1926. He set up the Harwood Self-Winding Watch Company in 1928 to market the watches in the UK, but the company failed in September 1931, not having sufficient financial resources to withstand the effects of the Great Depression. The watches also proved difficult to mass-produce and very delicate in use.

== Awards and honours ==
In 1957 he was awarded the Gold Medal of the British Horological Institute.

== Trivia ==
John Harwood had a son, John (d. 13 August 2019), who followed his father's career, becoming too, a horologist, initially in Harrow, Middlesex, before moving to Dunster, Somerset, where he maintained a shop for many years.
