= Omega Seamaster =

Line of mechanical diving watches

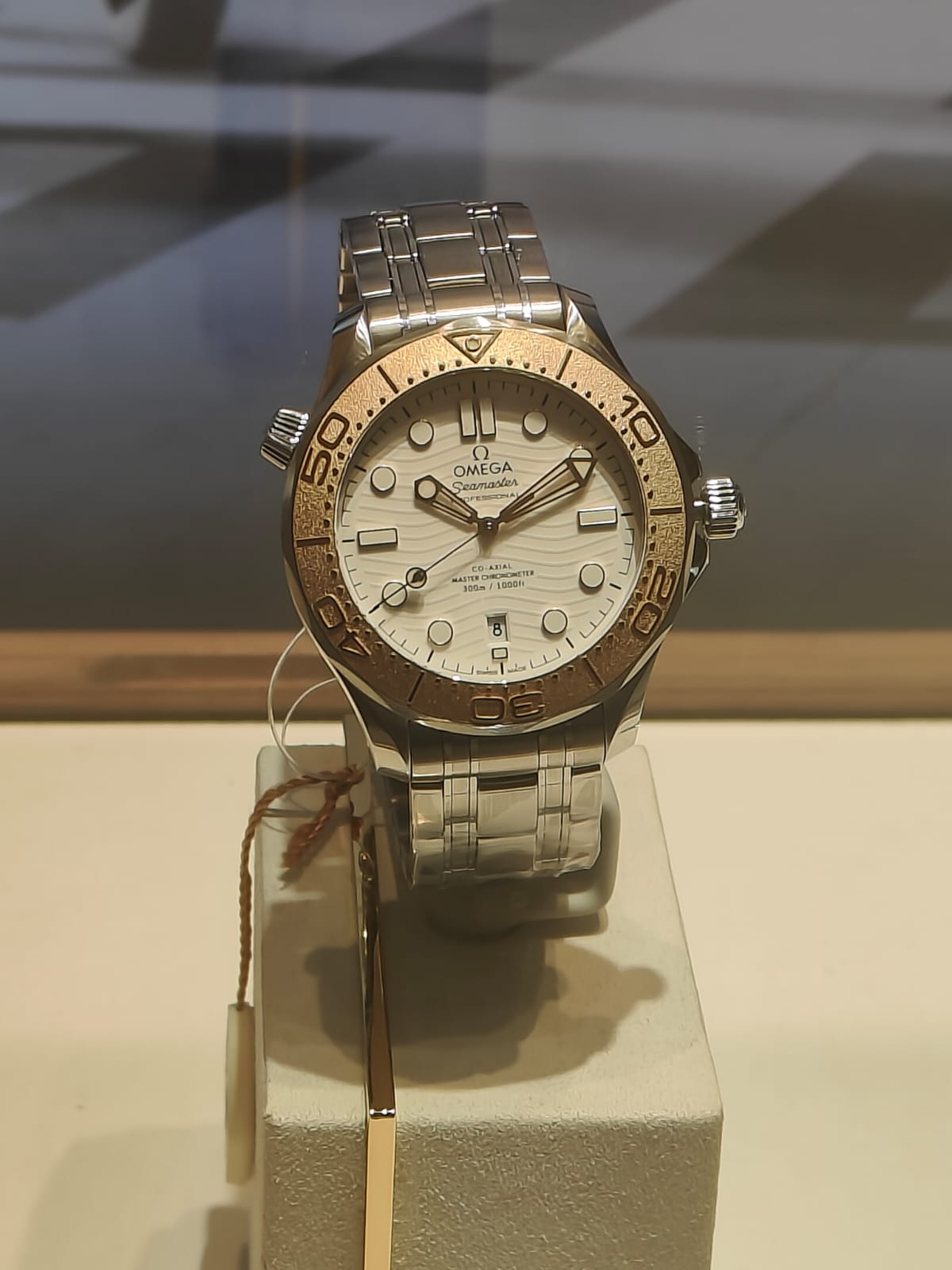
- Omega Seamaster Co-Axial Master Chronometre (2024)
- Manufacturer: Omega
- Display: Analogue/ Digital
- Introduced: 1948
- Movement: Manual / Automatic / Quartz

The Omega Seamaster is a line of automatic winding mechanical sports and diving watches from Omega with a history that can be traced back to the original water-resistant dress-style watch released in 1948.

Originally conceived as a robust, every day watch with water-resistance for 'town, sea, and country', the Seamaster line became popular with divers, explorers and professionals, and the line was soon associated with dive watches, in particular the Seamaster Diver Professional 300m model.

In 2019, three specially made experimental watches dubbed Omega Seamaster Planet Ocean Ultra Deep Professionals survived a 10,928 meter dive to the bottom of the Mariana Trench affixed to the bathyscaphe Limiting Factor, setting a new world record at the time as deepest dive watch by 12 meters.

== History ==
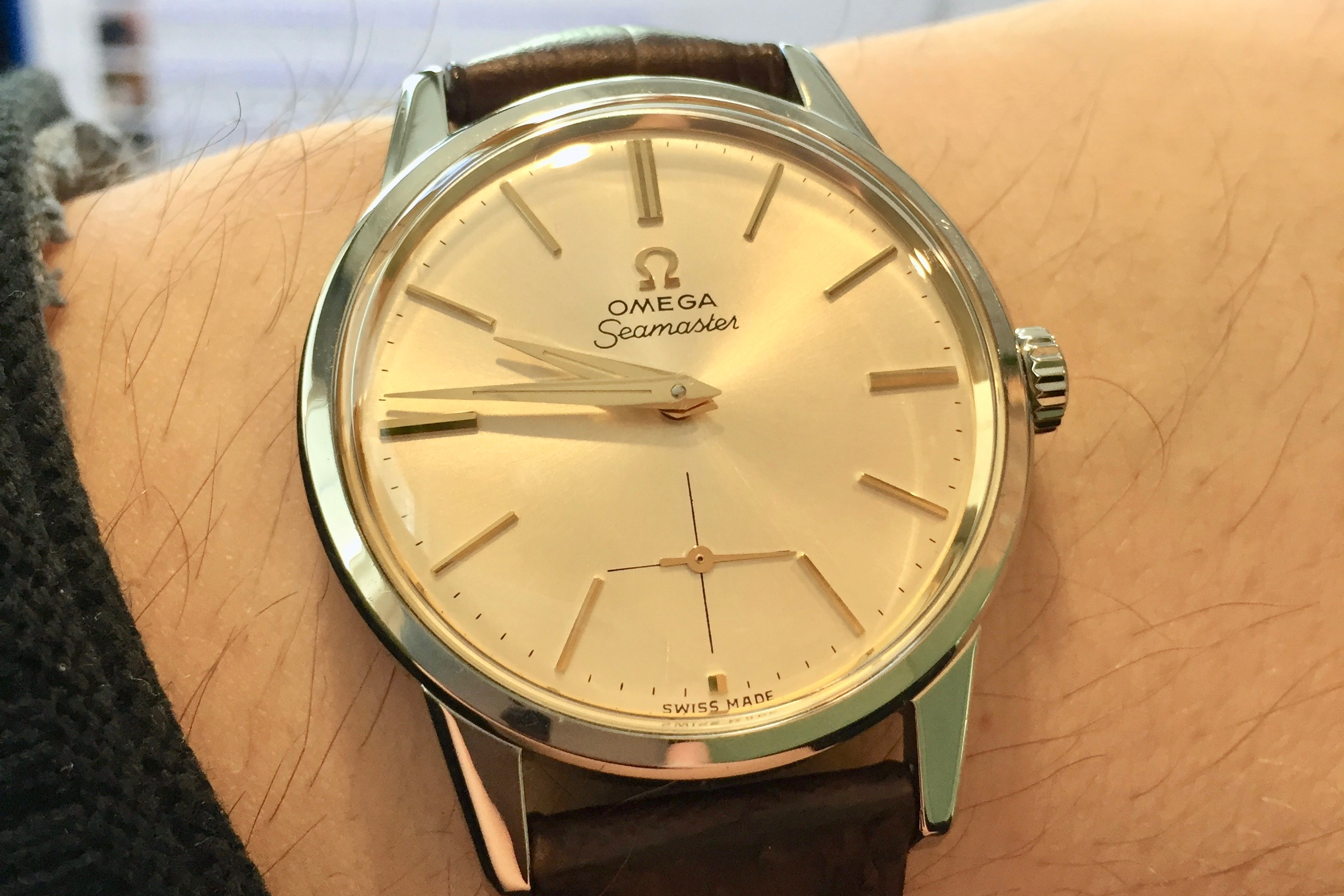
Omega Seamaster (1960). Champagne dial, ⌀ 35mm, small seconds.

The Seamaster is the longest-running product line still produced by Omega. It was introduced in 1948, and was based upon designs made for the British Royal Navy towards the end of World War II.

The original Seamaster's key feature was an O-ring gasket used to provide its waterproof seal. This design had been developed for use in submarines during the war and turned out to also be useful for watches, where it made them much less vulnerable to temperature and pressure changes than earlier lead- or shellac- based gasket designs. The Omega Seamaster first made a diving record in 1955, when diver Gordon McLean reached a depth of 62.5 metres (205 ft) in Australia.

=== Omega Professional "Trilogy" ===
In 1957, Omega introduced three separate watches including the Speedmaster, the Railmaster and Seamaster 300, a watch designed for professional divers.

=== James Bond ===
The Omega Seamaster has been associated with the James Bond movies since GoldenEye (1995), where Pierce Brosnan wore the Omega Seamaster Professional Diver 300M Quartz 2541.80.00. In the proceeding films starring Pierce Brosnan as the titular character, Bond wore an Omega Seamaster Professional Diver 300M Chronometer 2531.80.00.

Before 1995, actors portraying James Bond wore a range of watches, notably different versions of the Rolex Submariner. However, when selecting a watch for the character to wear in GoldenEye, costume designer Lindy Hemming selected the Seamaster model as she wanted James Bond to appear more 'modern and European'. Omega was eager to participate in the high-profile product placement opportunity to further its brand image and supplied the watches.

The Seamaster Professional Diver 300M was worn by James Bond in six movies, the Planet Ocean and Aqua Terra in three, in addition to sporting a limited edition Omega Seamaster 300 (not to be confused with the Professional Diver 300M) Master Co-Axial in Spectre. The Seamaster Professional Diver 300M that appears from GoldenEye to Casino Royale is made of stainless steel on a stainless steel bracelet, fitted with a blue dial, unidirectional rotating bezel with blue ring and a sapphire crystal. After its absence in three films, the Diver 300M returns in No Time to Die in the form of a new model, this time with a black dial, a titanium case, powered by Omega's Co-Axial Master Chronometer 8806 and is the first in the line of Seamasters to have a Milanese mesh strap and not to feature a date window. It was designed in collaboration with Daniel Craig.

In May 2026, Omega released a variant of the Seamaster Professional Diver 300M Chronograph for the video game, 007 First Light, marking the first time a variant of the Seamaster was produced for a 007 video game, and the first time James Bond wore a chronograph variant of the Seamaster.

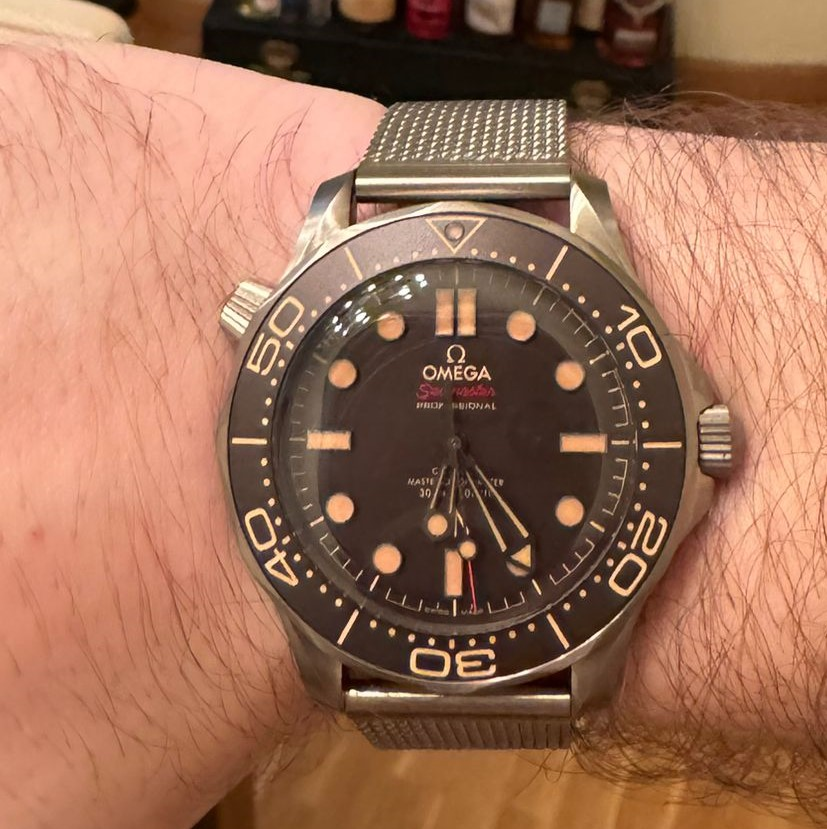
The official James Bond Seamaster from No Time to Die

Film	Watch(es)
GoldenEye – 1995	Seamaster Professional Diver 300M Quartz (2541.80.00)
Tomorrow Never Dies – 1997	Seamaster Professional Diver 300M (2531.80.00)
The World Is Not Enough – 1999	Seamaster Professional Diver 300M (2531.80.00)
Die Another Day – 2002	Seamaster Professional Diver 300M (2531.80.00)
Casino Royale – 2006	Seamaster Professional Diver 300M (2220.80.00) Seamaster Professional Planet Ocean (2900.50.91)
Quantum of Solace – 2008	Seamaster Professional Planet Ocean (2201.50.00)
Skyfall – 2012	Seamaster Professional Planet Ocean (232.30.42.21.01.001) Seamaster Aqua Terra (231.10.39.21.03.001)
Spectre – 2015	Seamaster 300 "SPECTRE" Limited Edition (233.32.41.21.01.001) Seamaster Aqua Terra (231.10.42.21.03.004)
No Time to Die – 2021	Seamaster Professional Diver 300M (210.90.42.20.01.001) Seamaster Aqua Terra (231.10.42.21.03.004)

== Models ==
Omega produces several models of Seamaster watches, with numerous variations of case materials, bracelets, water resistance, and case diameter. The current offerings among the Seamaster line are below:

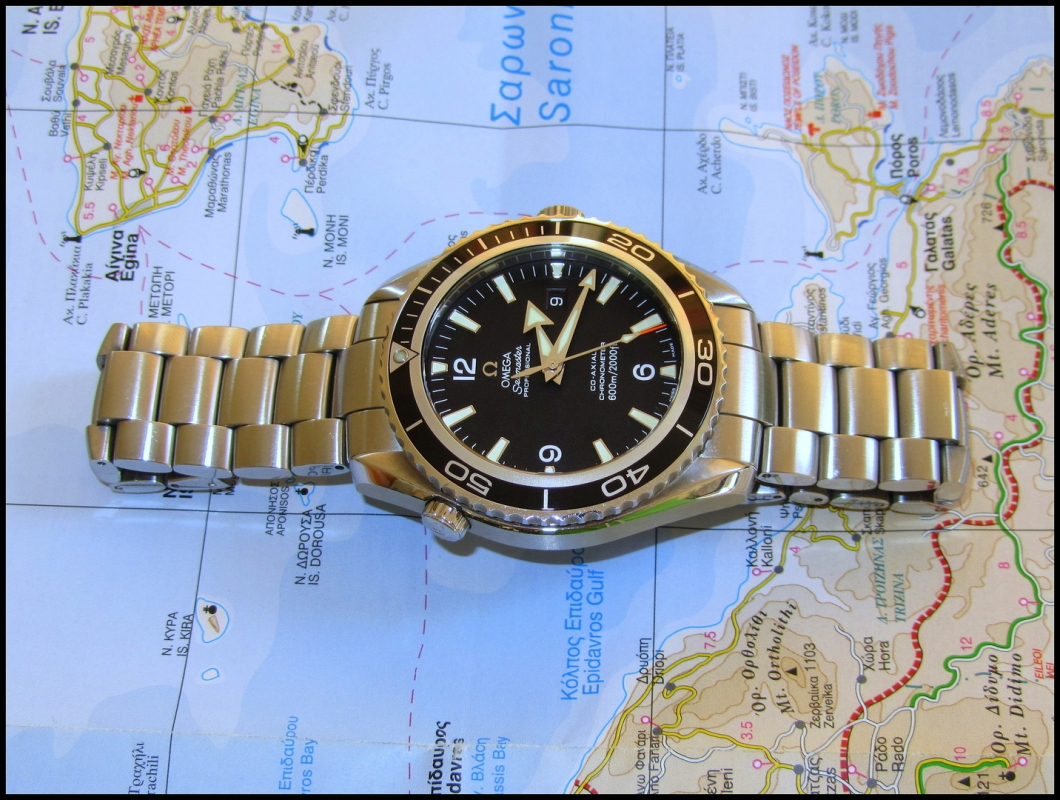
Omega Seamaster Planet Ocean 600m/2000ft diving watch

Seamaster Aqua Terra collection:

- Includes variations with date, day-date, annual calendar, GMT, world timer, and chronograph functionalities all sporting 150 meters of water resistance

Seamaster Diver Professional 300M collection:

- Includes variations with date, GMT, and chronograph functionalities all sporting 300 meters of water resistance

Seamaster Planet Ocean collection:

- Includes variations with date, GMT, and chronograph functionalities, all sporting at least 600 meters of water resistance. The Ultra Deep variant has a 6,000m water resistance depth rating, breaking all records at the time of its release. In 2025 Omega redesigned the Seamaster Planet Ocean series with the release of the 4th generations, reducing the thickness to 13.79mm and removing the Helium escape valve.

The Seamaster line also includes the below Heritage Models:

Seamaster 300:

- Not to be confused with the above Seamaster Diver Professional 300m; a modernized take on the original diving watch from Omega first launched in 1957

Seamaster Railmaster:

- A modernized take on the original antimagnetic watch offering from Omega which also first launched in 1957 and was specially designed for those working close to magnetic fields

Seamaster Ploprof 1200m:

- From "Plongeur Professionnel" or "Professional Diver"; originally launched in 1969, this is the continuation of Omega's heavy-duty tool watch for deep underwater use. This model was famously worn by Jacques Cousteau in his television series "The Undersea World of Jacques Cousteau"

== Military models ==
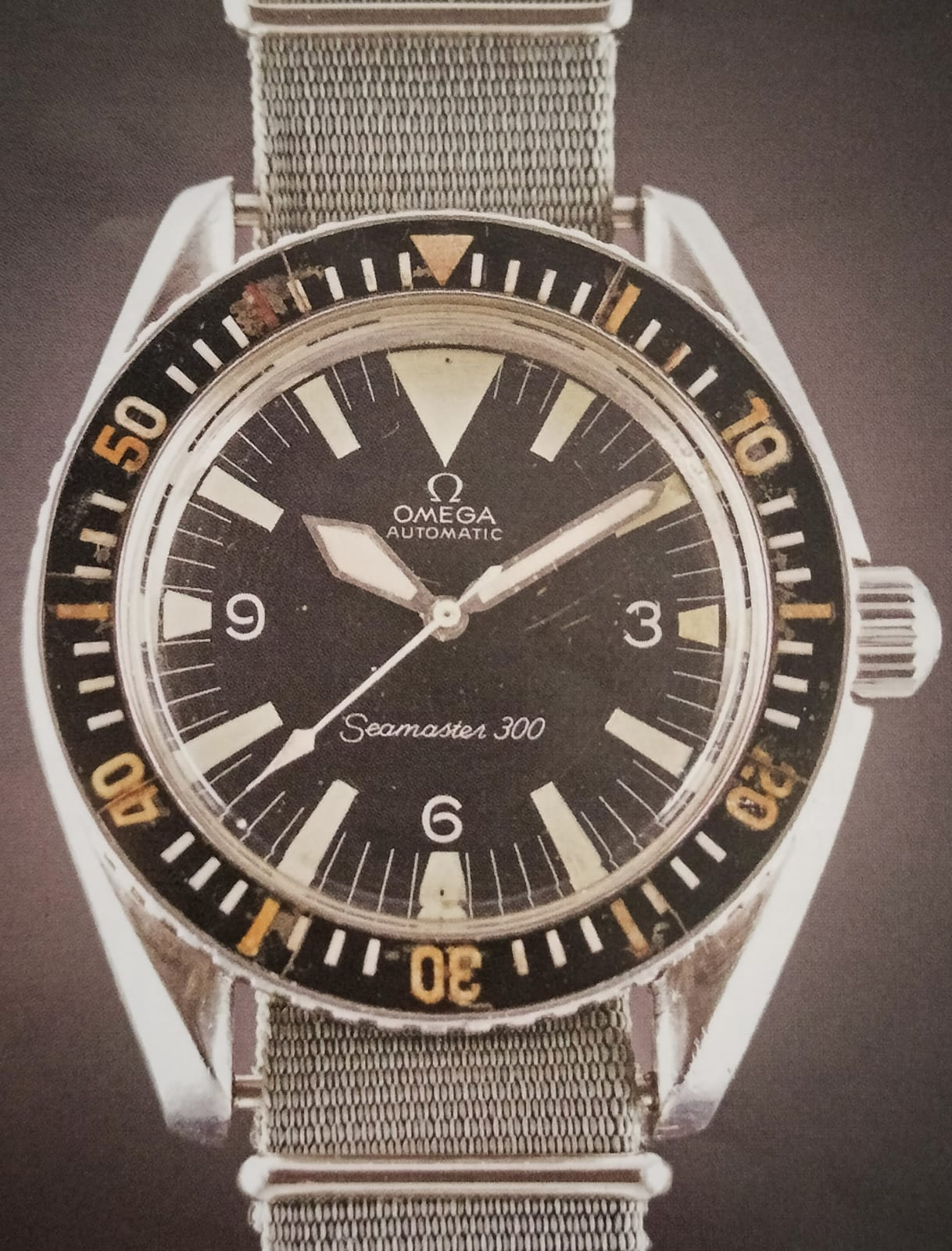
A military-issued Omega Seamaster 300

From 1967 until 1971, the British Royal Navy and Army issued Seamaster 300s to specialist units.

=== Unit Watch Program ===
Omega operates a unit watch program which offers a unique variant of the Seamaster Diver Professional 300M model with a fully-brushed bracelet, no-date dial, and customisable casebacks.

== See also ==
- Dive watch
- Rolex Submariner
- Omega Seamaster Omegamatic
- Omega Speedmaster
