= Bucherer =

Swiss luxury brand

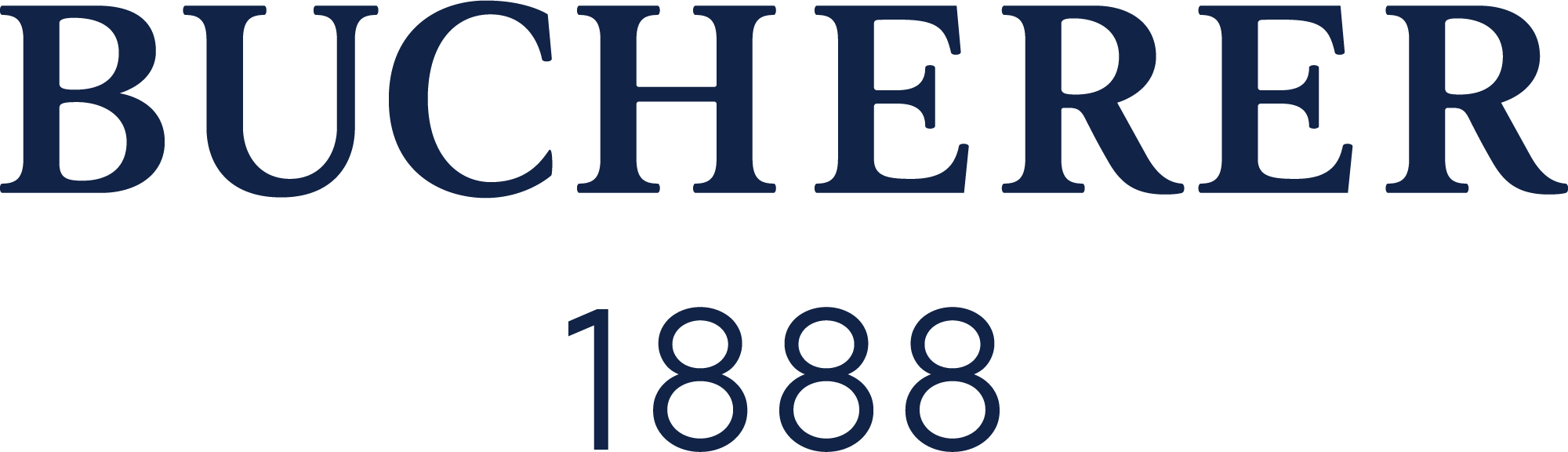

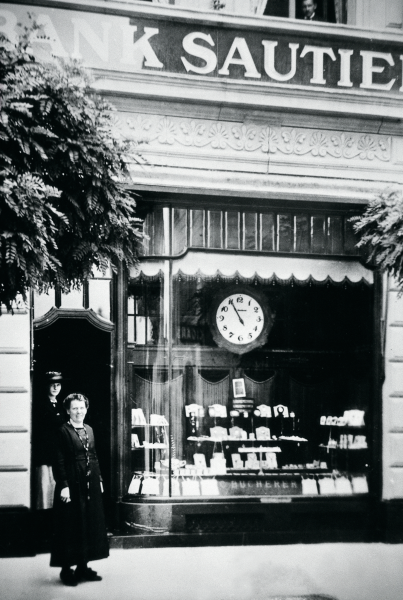
- First Bucherer boutique in Lucerne, Switzerland
- Native name: Bucherer AG
- Founded: September 2, 1888; 138 years ago
- Founder: Carl F. Bucherer
- Number of locations: 100 stores (2023)
- Key people: Guido Zumbühl (CEO); Daniel Egli (CFO); Patrick Graf (CCO)
- Revenue: $1.8 billion (2022 estimate)
- Number of employees: 2,400+ (2022)
- Parent: Rolex SA (since 2024)
- Website: bucherer.com

Bucherer (also Bucherer Group) is a multibrand watch and jewellery retailer based in Switzerland with over 100 stores worldwide. It was founded in 1888 by Carl F. Bucherer, who also became the namesake of a luxury Swiss watch brand.

Bucherer retails brand including Rolex, Carl F. Bucherer, Baume & Mercier, Blancpain, Breguet, Cartier, Chopard, Girard-Perregaux, Jaeger-LeCoultre, Longines, Oris, Panerai, Piaget, Rado, Roger Dubuis, TAG Heuer, Tissot, Tudor, Ulysse Nardin and Vacheron Constantin.

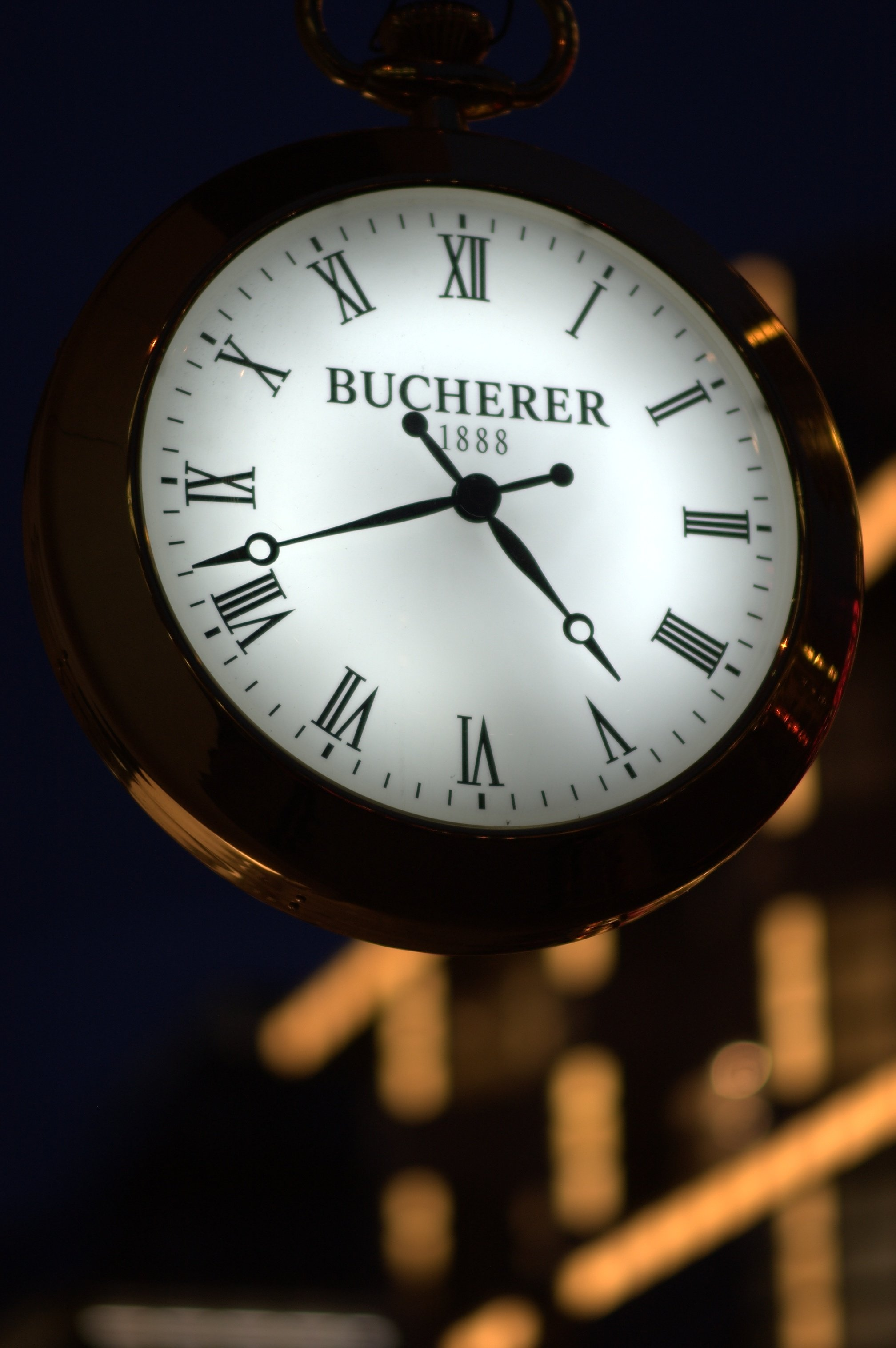
A Bucherer timepiece in Berlin

== History ==
Bucherer began as a hardware shop, opened by Carl Friedrich Bucherer and his wife, Louise in Lucerne, Switzerland. Originally a subsidiary of the Basel Trading Company, it became independent in 1892, diversifying into toys. In 1897, Bucherer opened a separate dedicated location specialising in jewellery and luxury goods.

In 1919, the company introduced its first own-branded collection of watches, aimed at women.

In the 1920s, their sons Ernst and Carl Eduard joined the business, and pioneered international expansion in Berlin and Chile. Multiple locations followed in popular tourist destinations including Interlaken, Lugano and Hotel Rigi in Lucerne.

Ernst partnered with Rolex founder Hans Wilsdorf in 1924, adding Rolex watched to the store's inventory and starting a partnership that lasted until Rolex acquired the company in 2023.

Under third-generation leader Jörg G. Bucherer, the company began expanding internationally again in 1986. That same year, Bucherer entered the modern German market by opening a boutique in Berlin.

Bucherer expanded further into Germany in 2002 by buying the Munich-based watch retailer Andreas Huber, later rebranding the stores under the Bucherer name.

Bucherer entered the US market in 2018 by buying Tourneau, a major American watch retailer. This acquisition greatly grew the company's global footprint, making it one of the largest watch and jewellery retailers in the world.

Rolex announced it was buying Bucherer in August 2023. The deal was finalized in 2024 after regulatory approval, officially making the retailer part of Rolex. This deal solidified a business relationship between the two companies that goes back to 1924.
