= Fortis Watches =

Swiss luxury watches manufacturer

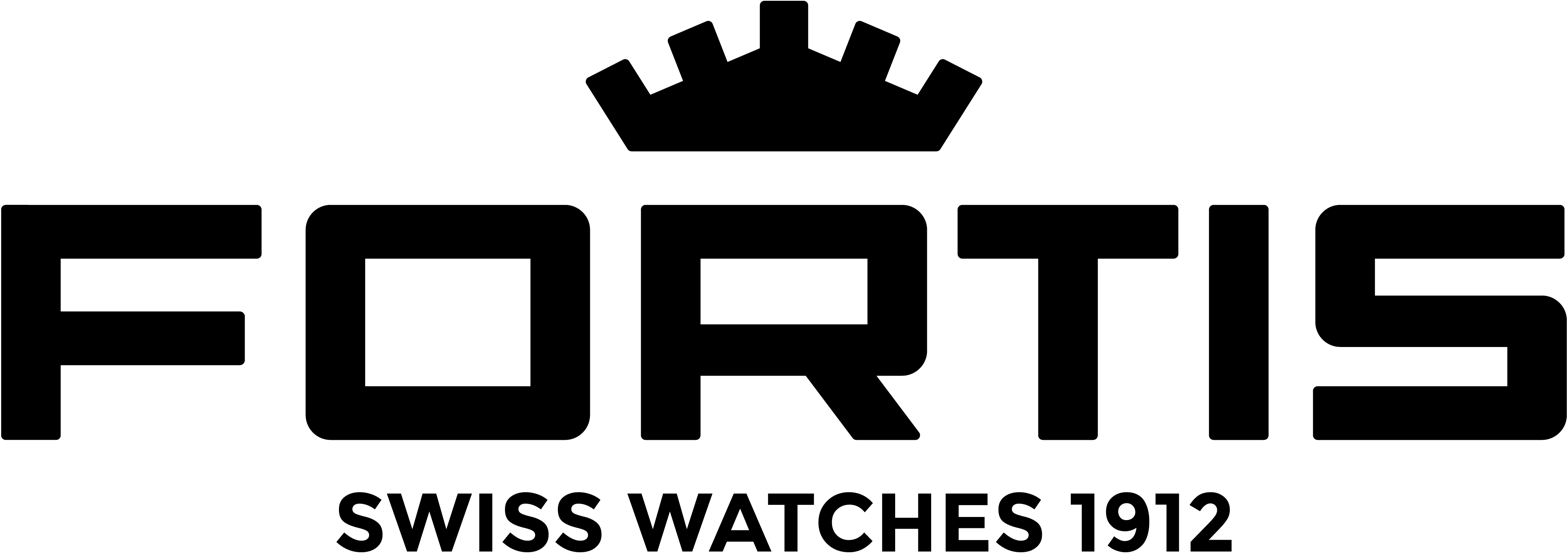
- Type: Privately held company
- Industry: Luxury Watches
- Founded: 1912
- Founder: Walter Vogt
- Headquarters: Grenchen, Switzerland
- Area served: Worldwide
- Key people: Owner and CEO - Jupp Philipp
- Products: Luxury Watches.
- Number of employees: 40
- Website: www.fortis-swiss.com

FORTIS Watches AG (formerly FORTIS Uhren AG), located in Grenchen is a luxury Swiss watches manufacturer that was founded by Walter Vogt in 1912. The brand is particularly known for robust, highly precise, automatic tool watches. In 1926, Fortis collaborated with British watchmaker John Harwood to produce the first serially manufactured automatic wristwatch. The company continues to operate from its historic headquarters in Grenchen, the same building constructed by Vogt in 1912. The brand is particularly known for robust, highly precise automatic tool watches. The owner and CEO of Fortis is Jupp Philipp.

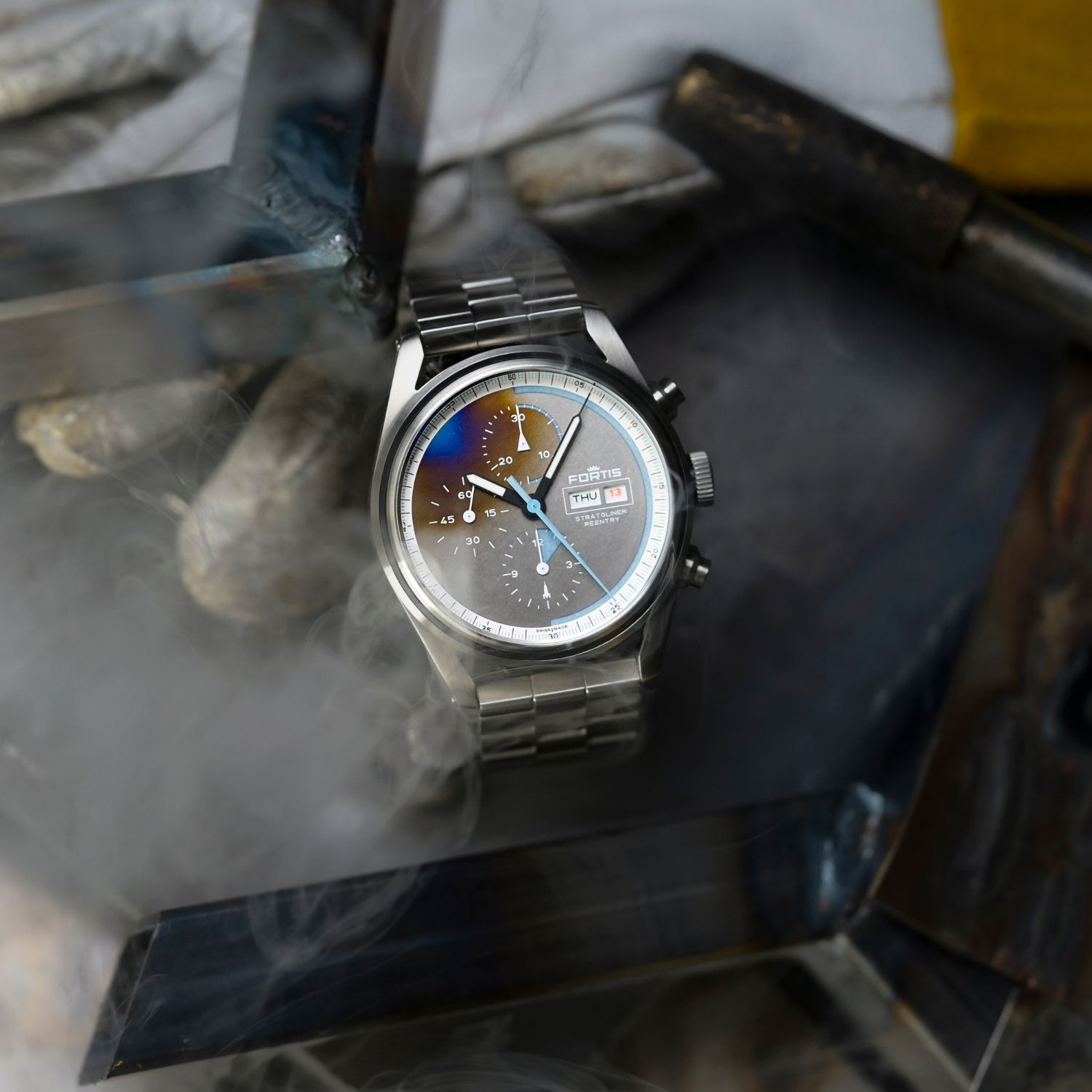
Fortis Stratoliner S-41 Reentry Edition

== History ==
Fortis was founded by Walter Vogt in 1912. Twelve years after its establishment, Vogt set up production with John Harwood, inventor of the automatic wristwatch. In 1926, Fortis released the patented Harwood Automatic, the first self-winding wristwatch, at Baselworld. In 1937, Fortis commemorated the company's 25th anniversary by manufacturing and marketing its first chronographs, including the Rolls and the Autorist. The Autorist was also designed by John Harwood and used the movement of the strap to power the watch. By 1943, Fortis introduced some of the world's first waterproof watches with the Fortissimo models.

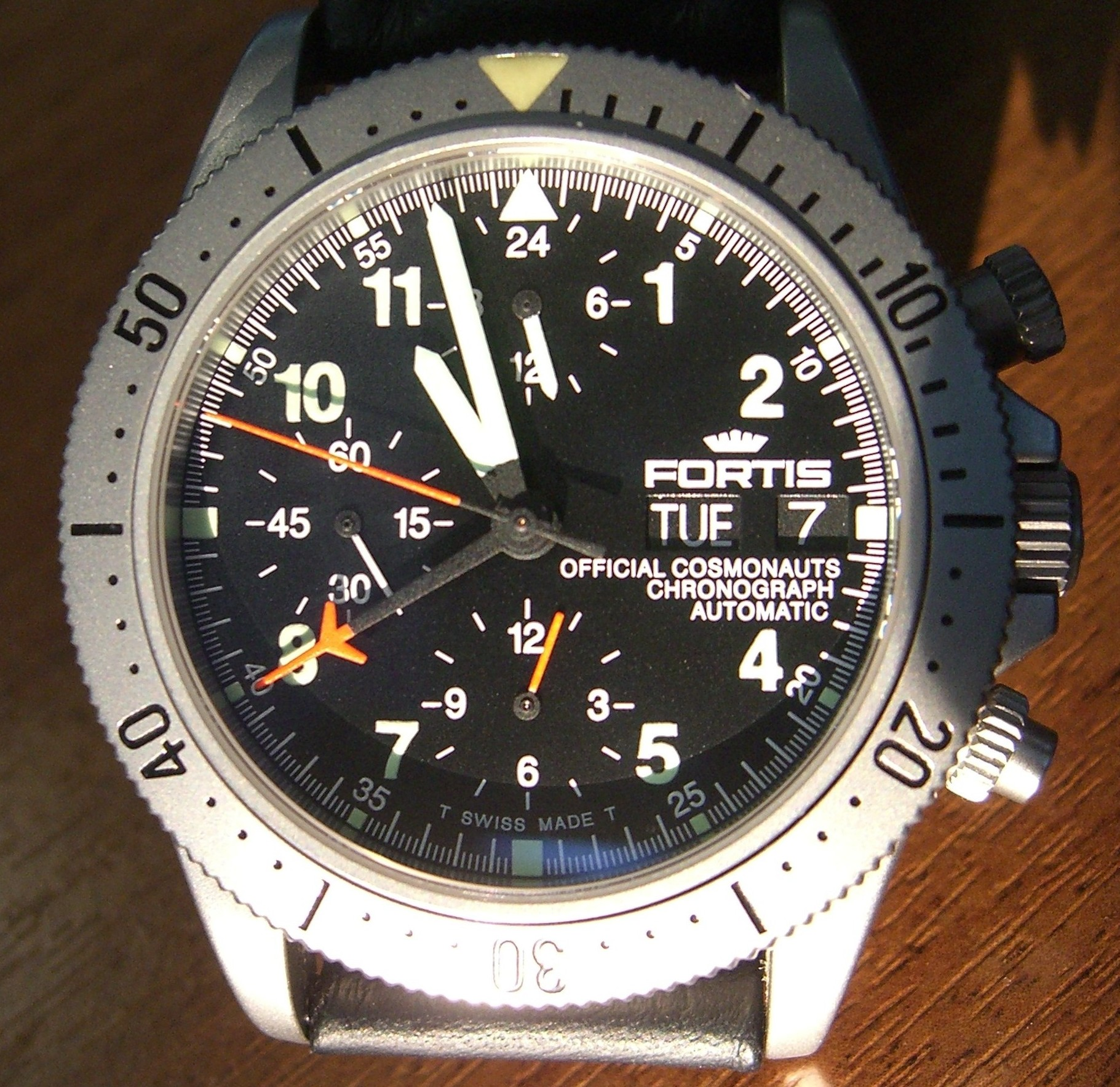
Official Cosmonauts Chronograph Automatic photo. Lemania 5100 movt.

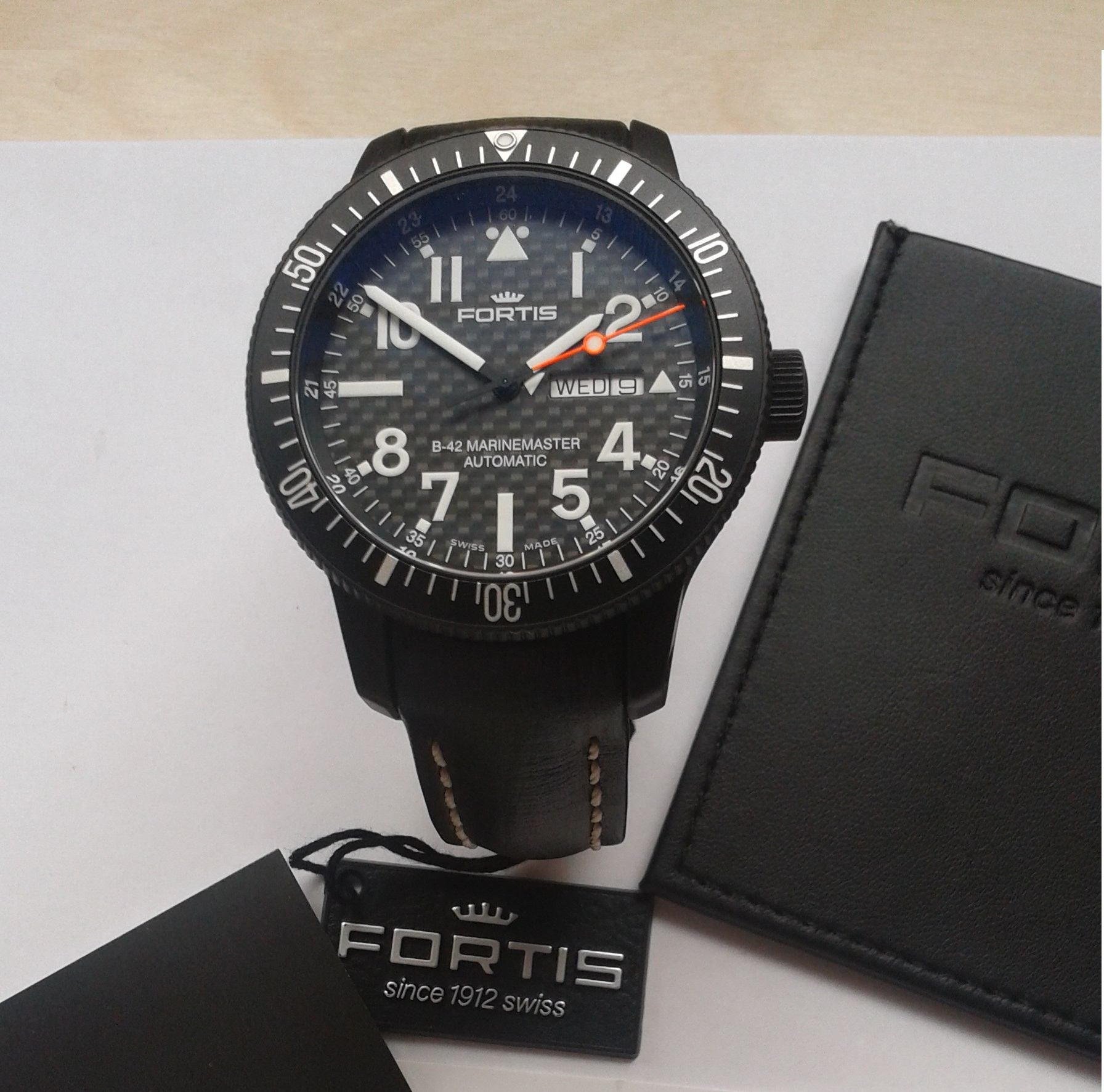
Fortis B-42 Marinemaster, Official Cosmonauts 20 ATM, PVD Titanium coated, carbon fiber dial, Powered by Automatic ETA-2836-2

In 1962 the Spacematic automatic was constructed to hold up in extreme conditions and temperature changes. The watch was tested by the seven members of a US space mission. In 1994 Fortis introduced strict endurance tests. This same year the Star City Training Center chose the Fortis Official Cosmonauts Chronograph as part of its issued equipment. Fortis automatic wristwatches have proven their space capability inside and outside of the protection of the space station. Since 1994 Fortis has been the exclusive supplier of crewed space missions authorized by the Russian Federal Space Agency. In 1997 the same watch, the Fortis Official Cosmonauts Chronograph, became the official watch of the German-Russian space mission MIR 97.

During Fortis' 75th anniversary year, it introduced a new edition of the Flieger automatic collection.

In 2004, the Flieger Chronograph was awarded the inaugural trophy of the European Aviation Watch of the Year.

Fortis has supplied unique watches to many military squadrons worldwide, including:

- Jagdgeschwader (Germany)
- Swiss 11 Fighters (Switzerland)
- Hellenic Tigers (Greece)
- NATO Forces (Hungary)
- Immelmann 51 (Germany)
- Thunder Tiger Aerobatic Team (Taiwan)
- Papa Squadron (Hungary)
- PC-7 Team (Switzerland)

In 1994, Fortis became the equipment supplier of the Juri-Gagarin-Kosmonautentrainingszentrums, which is a cosmonaut training centre in Russia. During a docking manoeuvre of the U.S. Space Shuttle Atlantis in September 1994, the model "Official Cosmonauts Chronograph" was worn on the space station Mir by the cosmonauts during the mission Sojus TM-19.

In 1998, FORTIS launched the development of the world's automatic chronograph with mechanical alarm function, which was patented with the patent number EP 0806712. The construction of this watch was done by Zurich watch engineer Paul Gerber.

In 2017, FORTIS experienced some financial difficulties. The company filed for definitive debt restructuring moratorium. Soon afterwards, the company brand and location was taken over by a private investor and FORTIS fan, Jupp Philipp. This led to the renaming of FORTIS Uhren AG into FORTIS Watches AG.

Under the new management, FORTIS is redefining the collections. Design and functionality are the main focus points. A new collaboration with Kenissi has been established.

== Awards ==
- 1956: Swiss Chronometer Award (Manager Alarm)
- 1988: iF product design award (Logo Swiss, Edition Blaupunkt)
- 1988: iF product design award (Fever Collection)
- 1994: GCTC Certificate (Space Certification) (Cosmonauts Chronograph)
- 2001: Medal of Honour: Star of the Blue Planet
- 2001: International Watch Award ('Official Cosmonauts Chronograph)
- 2001: Watch of the Year 4th (Aviation Chronograph Alarm)
- 2001: Goldene Unruh 2nd place (Watch Magazine & Focus Aviation Chronograph)
- 2001: Watch of the Year 7th (B-42 Aviation Chronograph)
- 2003: Goldene Unruh 3rd place (Watch Magazine & Focus B-42 Pilot Professional Chronograph Alarm)
- 2004: European Aviation Watch Award 1st & 2nd, Volez! (Aviation Chronograph & Aviation Chronograph Lady)
- 2004: European Aviation Watch 2nd, Volez! (B-42 Official Cosmonauts Chronograph')
- 2008: Best Brands 3rd, Flugrevue Aviation Watches
- 2009: Good Design Award (Spaceleader Chronograph)
- 2010: Focus Open Silver (Spaceleader Chronograph)
- 2011: German Design Award Nominee (Spaceleader Chronograph)
- 2012: red dot design award (B-47 Big Black)
- 2013: German Design Award Nominee (B-47 Big Black)
- 2013: Chrono Award - Premium Class (F-43 AVIATION Alarm GMT Certified Chronometer)
- 2020: Top Magazin Uhrenwahl: Luxury Class (Fortis Aeromaster Steel Alarm Chronograph)
- 2025: Watch Design of the Year Award: Stratoliner S-41 Reentry Edition
- 2025: Watch Person of the Year Award: Jupp Philipp, Owner & CEO Fortis Watches

== Literature ==
- Watch dictionary big watch dictionary; Author: Fritz von Osterhausen; Heel Verlag 2005 ISBN 978-3-89880-430-1
