= Rotating unbalance =

Uneven mass distribution around axis of rotation

Rotating unbalance is the uneven distribution of mass around an axis of rotation. A rotating mass, or rotor, is said to be out of balance when its center of mass (inertia axis) is out of alignment with the center of rotation (geometric axis). Unbalance causes a moment which gives the rotor a wobbling movement characteristic of vibration of rotating structures.

== Causes of imbalance ==
Routine manufacturing processes can cause stress on metal components. Without stress relief, the rotor will distort itself to adjust. Thermal distortion often occurs with parts exposed to increased temperatures. Metals are able to expand when in contact with heat, so exposure to warmer temperatures can cause either the entire piece of machinery to expand, or just certain parts, causing distortion.: Rotating parts involved in material handling almost always accumulate buildup. Moreover, when exposed to oil, these parts can be very easily distorted. Without adhering to a maintenance routine or implementing an inspection process, oil can seep into the parts, causing unbalance.: In some cases, vibration is desired, and a rotor is deliberately unbalanced to serve as a vibrator. An example of this is an aircraft's stick shaker.

== Effects of unbalance ==
- Vibration
- Noise
- Decreased life of bearings
- Unsafe work conditions
- Reduced machine life
- Increased maintenance

== Units used to express unbalance ==
- In terms of the mass eccentricity $e$: μm, mm, cm, ...; μin, mil, in, ...
- In terms of mass $m$ at a given radius: μg, mg, g, kg, ...; moz, oz, ...
- In terms of mass × radius moment (mR): mg-mm, g-mm, mg-cm, g-cm, kg-mm, ...; oz-in, g-in, ...

== Types of unbalance ==
=== Static unbalance ===
A static unbalance (sometimes called a force unbalance) occurs when the inertial axis of a rotating mass is displaced from and parallel to the axis of rotation. Static unbalances can occur more frequently in disk-shaped rotors because the thin geometric profile of the disk allows for an uneven distribution of mass with an inertial axis that is nearly parallel to the axis of rotation. Only one plane receives balance correction.

$$U = m \times r$$

where U = unbalance, m = mass, r = distance between unbalance and the centre of the object

=== Couple unbalance ===
A couple unbalance occurs when a rotating mass has two equal unbalance forces that are situated 180° opposite each other. A system that is statically balanced may still have a couple unbalance. Couple unbalance occurs frequently in elongated cylindrical rotors.

$$U = m \times r \times d$$

where d = distance between the two unbalance forces along the rotation axis.

=== Dynamic unbalance ===
In rotation an unbalance when the mass/inertia axis does not intersect with shaft axis then it is called dynamic unbalance. Combination of static and couple unbalances is dynamic unbalance. It occurs in virtually all rotors and is the most common kind of unbalance. It can be fixed by correcting the weight on at least two planes.

== How to correct or compensate unbalance ==
- Mass addition.
- Mass removal.
- Mass shifting.
- Mass centering.

The measurement of existing vibration and calculation of the change of mass required is typically carried out using some form of balancing machine.

== Grades ==
ISO 21940 classifies vibration in terms of G codes. Unfortunately, it is the theoretical value assuming the rotor was spinning in free space so it does not relate to actual operating conditions. Rotors of the same type having permissible residual specific unbalance value e_{per}, varies inversely with the speed of the rotor.

e_{per} × ω = Constant,

where ω = angular velocity (radians per second) e_{per} = permissible residual specific unbalance

This constant is quality grade G. Balance Grades are used to specify the allowable residual imbalance for rotating machinery. The ISO 1940 standard defines balance grades for different classes of machinery. A rotor balanced to G2.5 will vibrate at 2.5 mm/s at operating speed if rotating in a suspended state with no external influences.

U_{per} = (9.54 × G number × mass)/rpm

Where U_{per} = balance tolerance (or) residual imbalance

== Important formulas ==
$$F = U \omega^2$$
$$U = mass(unbalance) r$$
$$e = \frac{U}{m(rotor)}$$

Where F = force due to unbalance, U = unbalance. ω = angular frequency. e = specific unbalance. m = mass. r = distance between unbalance and the axis of rotation of the object.
