= Tourneau =

American luxury watch retailer

Tourneau, LLC
- Type: Private
- Industry: Retail
- Founded: 1900
- Founder: Wexler Family
- Headquarters: New York City, U.S.
- Number of locations: 26 (2019)
- Key people: Kilian Müller (CEO)
- Number of employees: 550
- Parent: Bucherer (2018–2023); Rolex (2023–present)
- Website: www.tourneau.com

Tourneau, LLC is a luxury watch retailer established in 1900 and based in the United States. In 2018 Tourneau was purchased by the European retailer, Bucherer. The company carries over 8,000 styles of men’s and women’s watches from nearly 40 luxury brands. Tourneau also sells certified pre-owned watches; offering a trade-in program for upgrading watch styles.

== History ==
In 1900, the Tourneau family established a watch selling business in the Russian Empire, fleeing to Paris after the Revolution before emigrating to New York City in 1924. The Tourneau brothers opened a small dressmaking shop, with a watch counter, in the Berkshire Place Hotel. They followed this with the company's first full shop at Madison Avenue and 49th Street in 1930. In 1940 a second location was founded in the Pennsylvania Hotel across from Penn Station. The first West Coast store was opened during the 1990s in the South Coast Plaza mall in Costa Mesa.

In 1997 the company opened The Tourneau TimeMachine on 57th Street in New York City, and was at the time the world's largest watch store. Then in 2005, the Tourneau Time Dome in Las Vegas assumed the Guinness World Record. In 2011 Tourneau began selling a contemporary collection of watches named the TNY Series that has been inspired by the architecture and design of New York City. In 2012, Tourneau partnered with Product Red to produce TOURNEAU (PRODUCT)RED Special Edition watches. 15% of the retail price of each (TOURNEAU)RED watch is donated to The Global Fund to Fight AIDS, Tuberculosis and Malaria. In March 2015, a third NYC store was opened in Bryant Park.

== Operations ==
By 2015 the company had 33 stores across 13 states, including the flagship stores in Las Vegas and New York. Tourneau is currently the largest authorized retailer of timepieces in the United States, with about 8,000 watches and 100 brands. Tourneau also has a trade-in program for upgrading watch styles. Tourneau is the point of purchase for both the regular collections of time piece brands, as well as limited edition lines that are available only at Tourneau stores. Tourneau stores also host exhibitions of rare time pieces and events. In addition to its retail locations, Tourneau has a watch servicing center in Long Island City and it also operates an e-commerce site.
