= Automatic watch =

Timekeeping device that is driven by a spring that winds by motion of the wearer

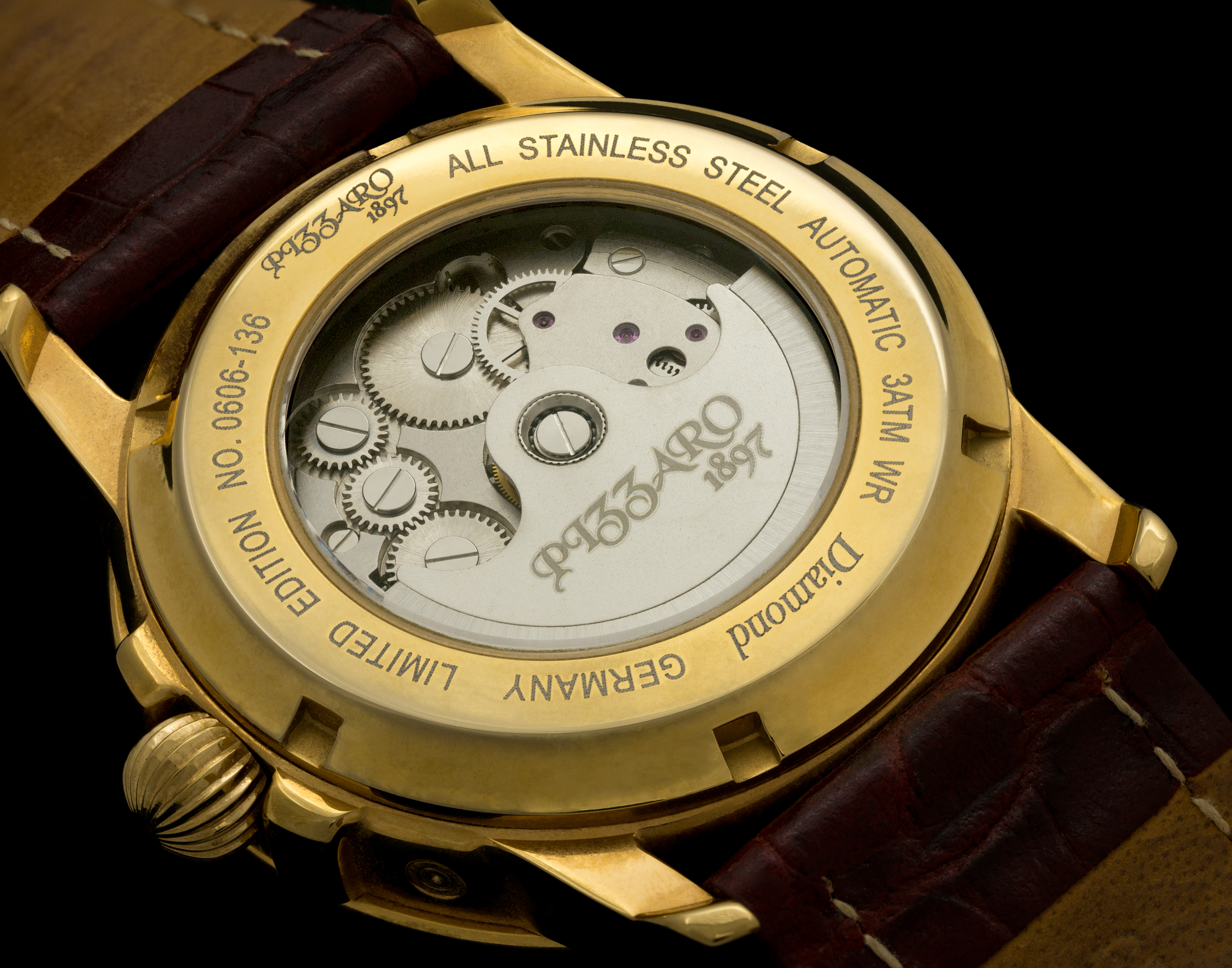
Backside view of an automatic watch with exhibition case back, showing its movement. The semicircular central rotor which winds the mainspring is plainly visible.

Video of the rotor turning in an automatic wristwatch having a glass back, when the watch is moved by hand

An automatic watch, also known as a self-winding watch or simply an automatic, is a mechanical watch where the natural motion of the wearer provides energy to wind the mainspring, making manual winding unnecessary if worn enough. It is distinguished from a manual watch in that a manual watch must have its mainspring wound by hand at regular intervals.

== Operation ==
In a mechanical watch the watch's gears are turned by a spiral spring called a mainspring. In a manual watch, energy is stored in the mainspring by turning a knob, the crown, on the side of the watch. Then the energy from the mainspring powers the watch movement until it runs down, requiring the spring to be wound again.

A self-winding watch movement has a mechanism which winds the mainspring using the natural motions of the wearer's body. The watch contains an oscillating weight that turns on a pivot. The normal movements of the watch in the user's pocket (for a pocketwatch) or on the user's arm (for a wristwatch) cause the rotor to pivot on its staff, which is attached to a ratcheted winding mechanism. The motion of the watch is thereby translated into circular motion of the weight which, through a series of reverser and reducing gears, eventually winds the mainspring. There are many different designs for modern self-winding mechanisms. Some designs allow winding of the watch to take place only while the weight swings in one direction while other, more advanced, mechanisms have two ratchets and wind the mainspring during both clockwise and anti-clockwise weight motions.

The fully wound mainspring in a typical watch can store enough energy reserve for roughly two days, allowing the watch to keep running through the night while stationary. In many cases automatic wristwatches can also be wound manually by turning the crown, so the watch can be kept running when not worn, and in case the wearer's wrist motions are not sufficient to keep it wound automatically. (Note: A notable exception is Seiko's wide range of watches based on the company's 7S26 movement, which cannot be hand-wound.)

=== Preventing overwinding ===
Self-winding mechanisms continue working even after the mainspring is fully wound up. If a simple mainspring was used, this would put excessive tension on the mainspring. This could break the mainspring, and even if it did not, it can cause a problem called "knocking" or "banking". The excessive drive force applied to the watch movement gear train can make the balance wheel rotate with excessive amplitude, causing the impulse pin to hit the back of the pallet fork horns. This will make the watch run fast, and could break the impulse pin. To prevent this, a slipping clutch device is used on the mainspring so it cannot be overwound.

=== Slipping spring or bridle ===
The slipping mainspring device was patented by Adrien Philippe, one of the founders of Patek Philippe, on 16 June 1863, long before self-winding wristwatches. In an ordinary watch mainspring barrel, the outer end of the spiral mainspring is attached to the inside of the barrel. In the slipping barrel, the mainspring is attached to a circular steel expansion spring, often called the bridle, which presses against the inside wall of the barrel, which has serrations or notches to hold it.

As long as the mainspring is less than fully wound, the bridle holds the mainspring by friction to the barrel wall, allowing the mainspring to be wound. When the mainspring reaches full wind, its force is stronger than the bridle spring, and further winding pulls the bridle loose from the notches and it simply slides along the wall, preventing the mainspring from being wound further. The bridle must grip the barrel wall with just the right force to allow the mainspring to wind fully but not overwind. If it grips too loosely, the bridle will begin to slip before the mainspring is fully wound, a defect known as mainspring creep which results in a shortened reserve power time.

A further advantage of this device is that the mainspring cannot be broken by excessive manual winding. This feature is often described in watch company advertising as an unbreakable mainspring.

== History ==
=== Pocket watches ===
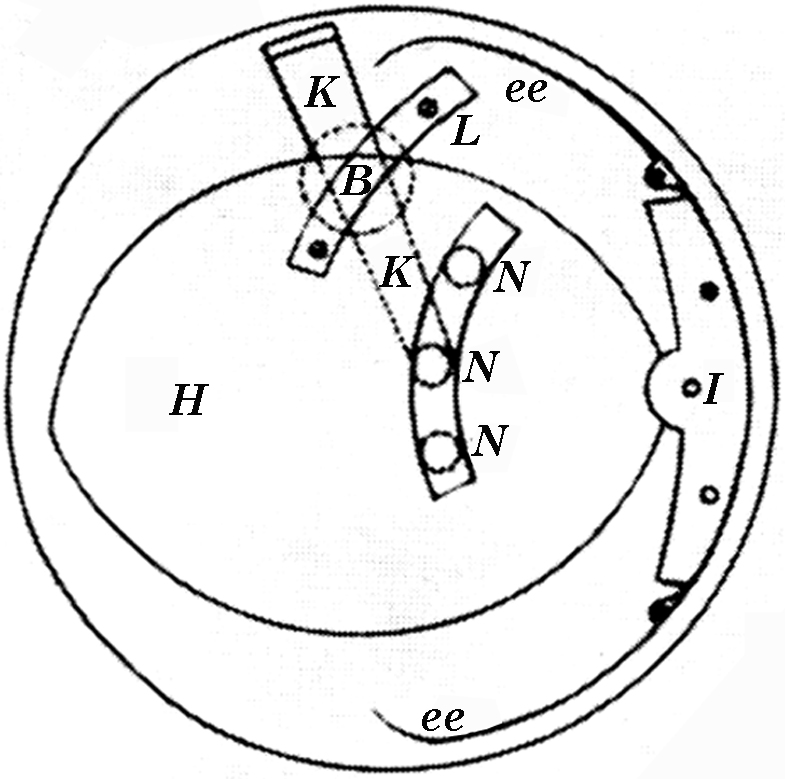
Illustration of an automatic watch with side weight from English patent No. 1249 "Recordon's Specification", 1780

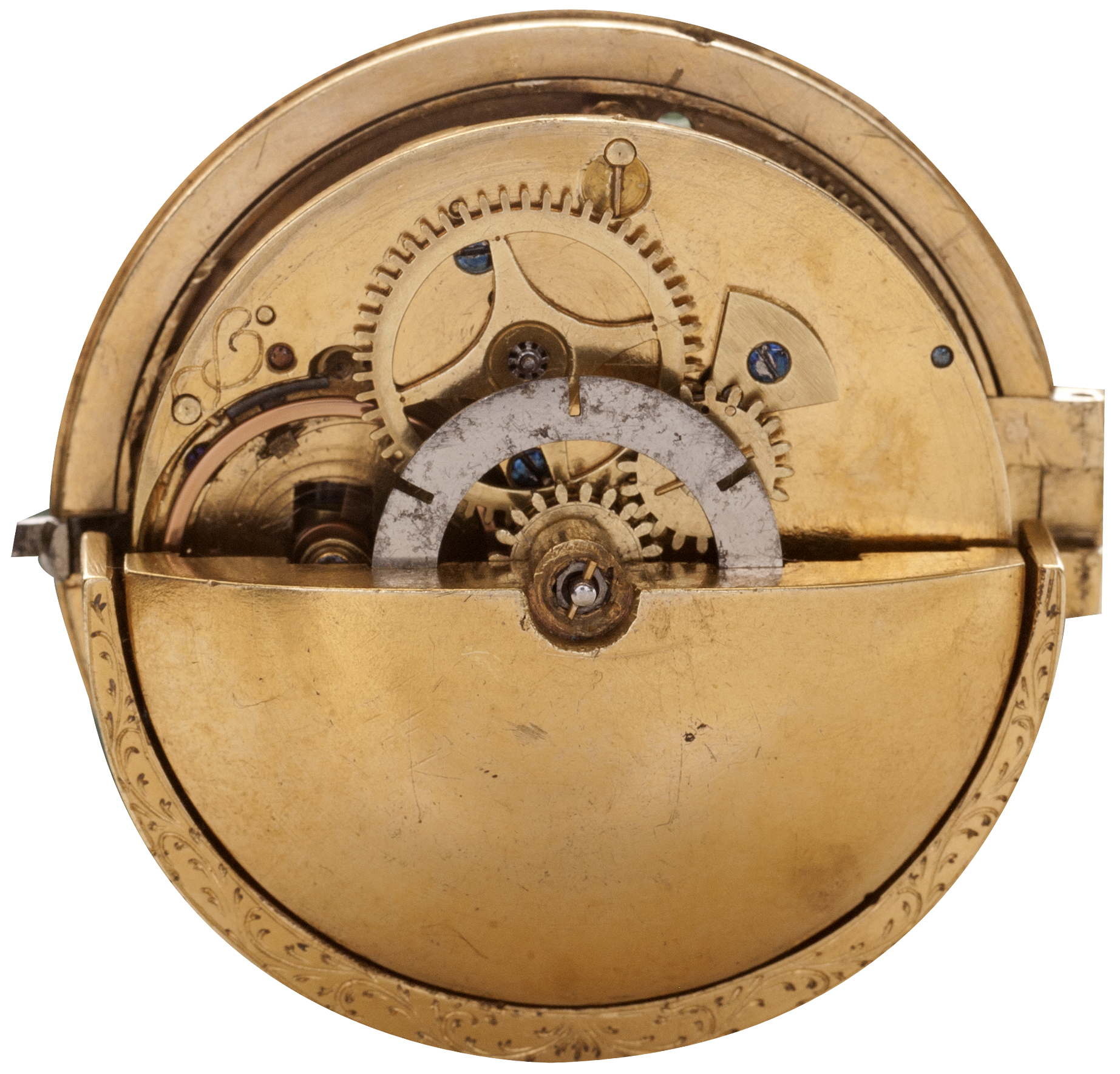
Automatic watch with rotor weight. Signed on the dial "Mazzi à Locarno", c. 1778

The earliest reference to self-winding watches is at the end of 1773 when a newspaper reported that Joseph Tlustos had invented a watch that did not need to be wound. But his idea was probably based on the myth of perpetual motion, and it is unlikely that it was a practical solution to the problem of self-winding watches.

The earliest credible evidence for a successful design is the watch made by the Swiss watchmaker Abraham-Louis Perrelet, who lived in Le Locle. In late 1776 or early 1777, he invented a self-winding mechanism for pocket watches but the original reports make no mention of the mechanism used, although later evidence could point to a side weight type. The Geneva Society of Arts, reporting on this watch in 1777, stated that 15 minutes walking was necessary to fully wind the watch.

In 1777 Abraham-Louis Breguet also became interested in the idea, and his first attempts led him to make a self-winding mechanism with a barrel remontoire. Although a successful design, it was too complex and expensive for it to be manufactured and sold.

About the end of 1777 or early 1778, Hubert Sarton designed a watch with a rotor mechanism. Towards the end of 1778 he sent a watch to the French Academy of Sciences and a report was written which, together with a drawing, gave a detailed description of the mechanism. Sarton's design is similar to those used in modern wrist watches, although there is no evidence linking the 18th-century design to 20th-century developments.

About the beginning of 1779, Abraham-Louis Breguet became aware of Perrelet's watches, probably through Louis Recordon, who travelled from Geneva to London via Le Locle and Paris. Breguet studied and improved the design, and made many self-winding watches from then to about 1810.

Although a few self-winding watches and patents for them were made from 1780 on, for more than one hundred years these watches were rare, until the advent of the wrist watch.

During the years 1776 to 1810 four different types of weight were used:

Side-weight
The weight pivots at the edge of the movement and can oscillate up and down. The movement of the weight is limited to about 40°. This is the most common design produced by many makers including Breguet.
These watches were called jerking watches because, even with buffers, when the weight hit the case the whole watch would jerk.

Center-weight
The weight pivots in the center of the movement and rotates clockwise and anti-clockwise. The weight is supported by a bridge that blocks the rotation and it is limited to about 180°. A few movements were made by different makers.

Rotor-weight
Again the weight pivots in the center of the movement and rotates clockwise and anti-clockwise. However, there is no bridge and it can rotate 360°. Very few of these movements were made.

Movement-weight
Here the whole movement is pivoted in the case and acts as the weight. Only one example is known, made in 1806.

As noted above, some watches used bidirectional winding and others used unidirectional winding. The latter is sufficient and all of Breguet's watches used unidirectional winding.

Before the invention of the slipping mainspring, automatic watches had a system for locking the weight. Most common, as in the 1780 drawing, when the mainspring was fully wound a lever K was raised that entered a hole N in the weight to prevent it from moving until the mainspring had unwound enough to lower the lever. Different methods were used in side-weight, rotor and center-weight mechanisms.

=== Wrist watches ===
The advent of the wrist watch after World War I led to renewed interest in self-winding mechanisms, and all four types listed above were used:

- 1922: Léon Leroy, a side-weight system. This was almost certainly derived from Breguet's design.
- 1923: Harwood, a center-weight system (invented c. 1917). This is discussed below. It is not known if Harwood was influenced by earlier pocket watch designs.
- 1930: Léon Hatot, Rolls watch, where the whole movement moves sideways. This was probably an independent re-invention.
- 1931: Rolex, a rotor system with unidirectional winding.

==== Harwood "Bumper" wristwatches: 1923 ====
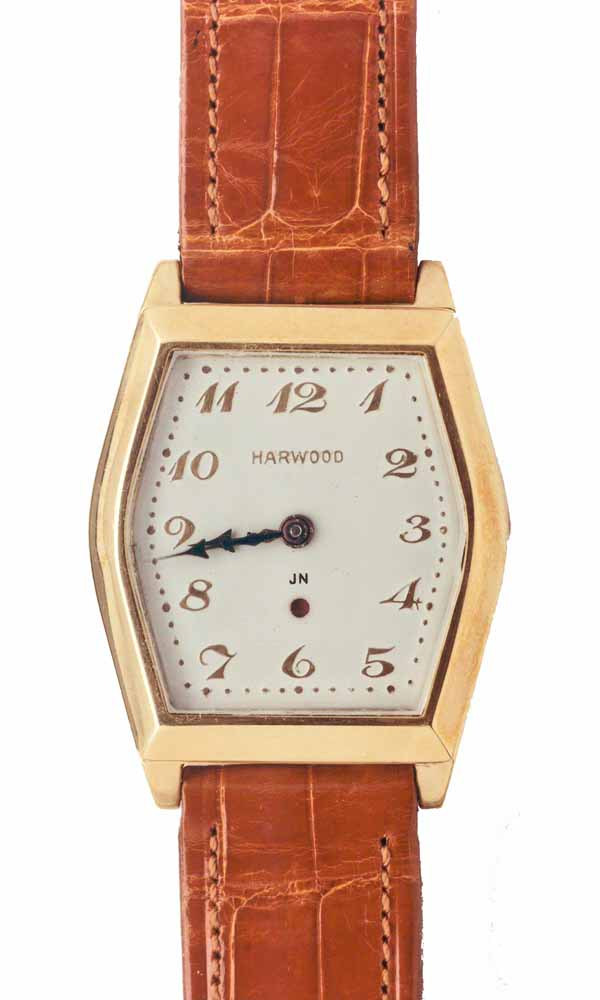
First automatic wristwatch, Harwood, ca. 1929 (Deutsches Uhrenmuseum, Inv. 47–3543)

Invented by John Harwood, a watch repairer from Bolton, England, who took out a UK patent with his financial backer, Harry Cutts, on 7 July 1923, and obtained a corresponding Swiss patent on 16 October 1923. The Harwood system used a pivoting weight which swung as the wearer moved, winding the mainspring. The ratchet mechanism wound the mainspring only when moving in one direction. The weight did not rotate a full 360°; spring bumpers limited its swing to about 180°, to encourage a back and forth motion. This early type of self-winding mechanism is now referred to as a 'hammer' or 'bumper'.

Like its 18th-century counterparts, Harwood's watch also had a problem with jerking because "the brass weight hit too sharply against the banking pins as it pivoted".

When fully wound, Harwood's watch would run for 12 hours autonomously. It did not have a conventional stem winder, so the hands were moved manually by rotating a bezel around the face of the watch. The watches were first produced with the help of Swiss watch manufacturer Fortis and went on sale in 1928. Thirty thousand were made before the Harwood Self-Winding Watch Company collapsed in 1931 in the Great Depression. 'Bumper' watches were the first commercially successful automatic watches; they were made by several high grade watch manufacturers during the 1930s and 1940s.

==== Rolex ====
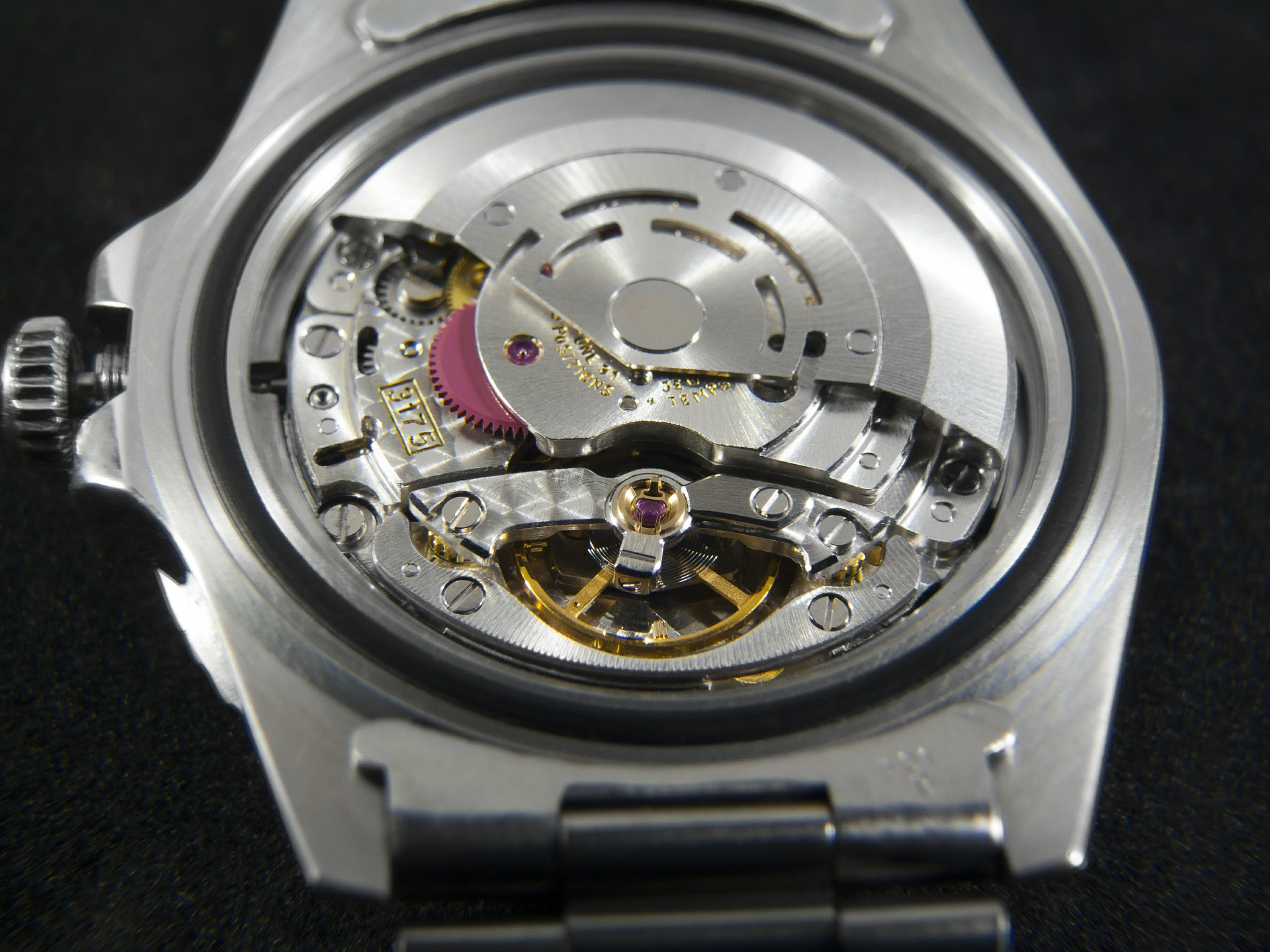
Rolex caliber 3175, released in 1988 and used until 1999 in the GMT-Master 16700 watch

The Rolex Watch Company improved Harwood's design in 1930 and used it as the basis for the Shants Company, in which the centrally mounted semi-circular weight could rotate through a full 360° rather than the about 200° of the 'bumper' winder. Rolex's version also increased the amount of energy stored in the mainspring, allowing it to run autonomously for up to 35 hours.

Information about 18th-century rotor watches was not published until 1949. Although the Oyster Perpetual was probably an original invention, the company may have known of Coviot's 1893 patent that re-invented the 18th-century design.

==== Glycine and mass production of automatics ====
With John Harwood's patent for self-winding watches set to expire in the early 1930s, Glycine founder Eugène Meylan started developing his own self-winding mechanism. Meylan's design was unusual: a separate module that could be used with almost any 8.75 ligne (19.74 millimeter) watch movement. In October 1930, Glycine released their first automatic watches using this module, which became the world's first widely produced automatic watches. This allowed Glycine to survive the global depression in the 1930s that caused many Swiss watchmakers to close shop.

==== Eterna ball bearing ====
The next development for automatic watches came in 1948 from Eterna Watch. To wind a watch effectively, one of the chief requirements of a rotor is heft. Until this point, the best bearing used in any watch was a jewel bearing, which perfectly suits the small gears of a watch. A rotor, on the other hand, requires a different solution. In 1948, Eterna introduced the solution that is still in use today: ball bearings. Ball bearings provide robust support for a heavy object to rotate smoothly and reliably even under abnormal stress, such as if the watch were dropped. Eterna adopted geared bidirectional winding shortly afterwards.

==== Carl F. Bucherer weighted geared ring ====
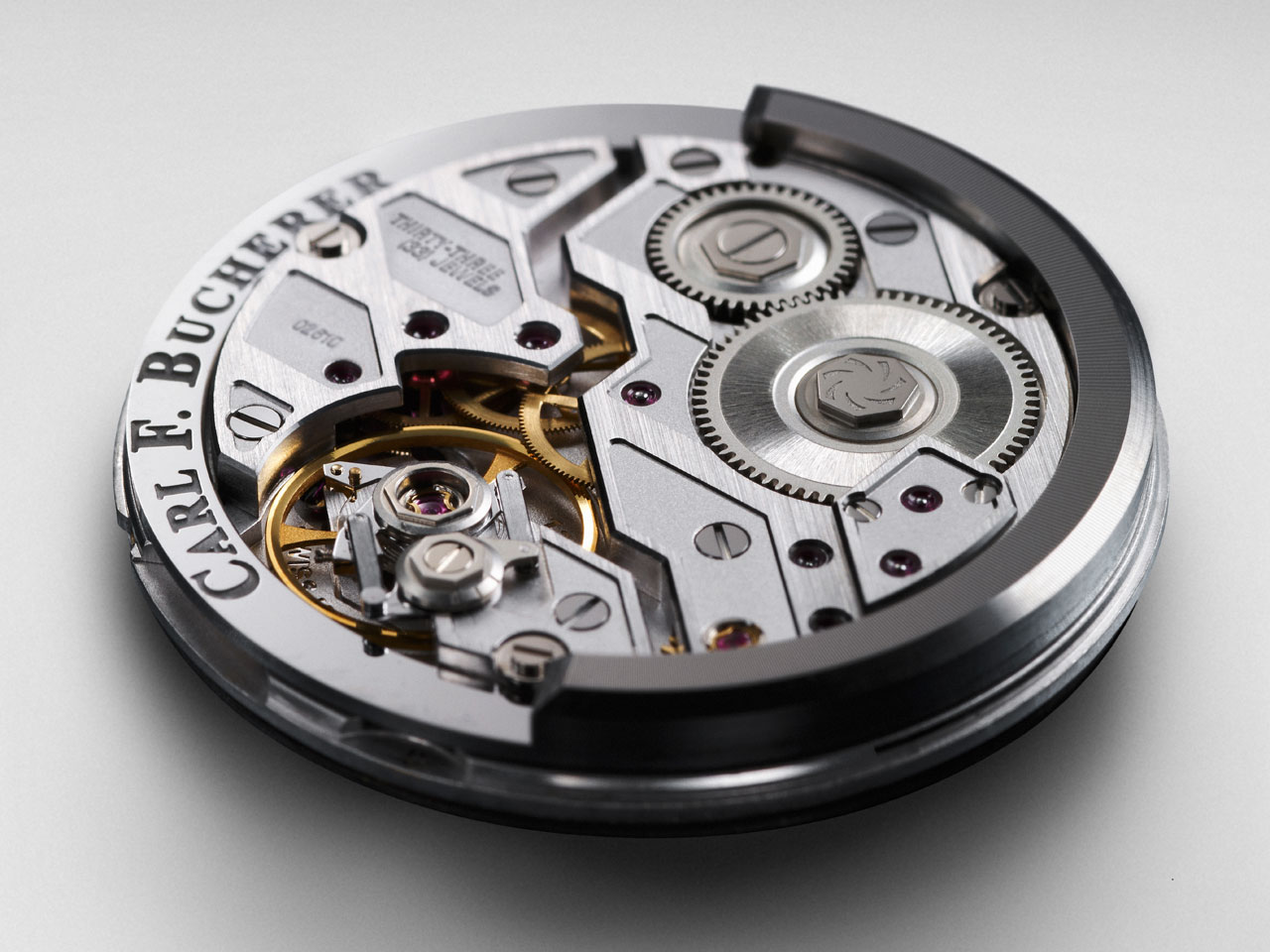
CFB A1000 movement using a peripherally mounted geared ring with a mass segment made of tungsten

By the 1960s, automatic winding had become widespread in quality mechanical watches. Because the rotor weight needed in an automatic watch takes up a lot of space in the case, increasing its thickness, some manufacturers of quality watches, such as Patek Philippe, continue to design manually wound watches, which can be as thin as 1.77 millimeters.

However, in 2007, Carl F. Bucherer introduced a new rotor-free automatic winding system. Instead of using a conventional rotor, it has a tungsten weight mounted around the edge of the movement. This weight, which rotates on carbon rollers, turns whenever the watch moves, winding the mechanism. No rotor means thinner watches and an ultradense weight swinging around a greater radius means a better chance of achieving a greater power reserve with same amount of arm movement.

== See also ==
- Automatic quartz
- Jewel bearing
- Regenerative brake
