= Two-way satellite time and frequency transfer =

Simultaneous observation method

Two-way satellite time and frequency transfer (TWSTFT) is a high-precision long distance time and frequency transfer mechanism between time bureaux to determine and distribute time and frequency standards.

As of 2003 TWSTFT is being evaluated as an alternative to be used by the Bureau International des Poids et Mesures in the determination of International Atomic Time (TAI), as a complement to the current standard method of simultaneous observations of GPS transmissions.
