= MoonSwatch =

Watch collection by Omega and Swatch

Swatch х Omega MoonSwatch
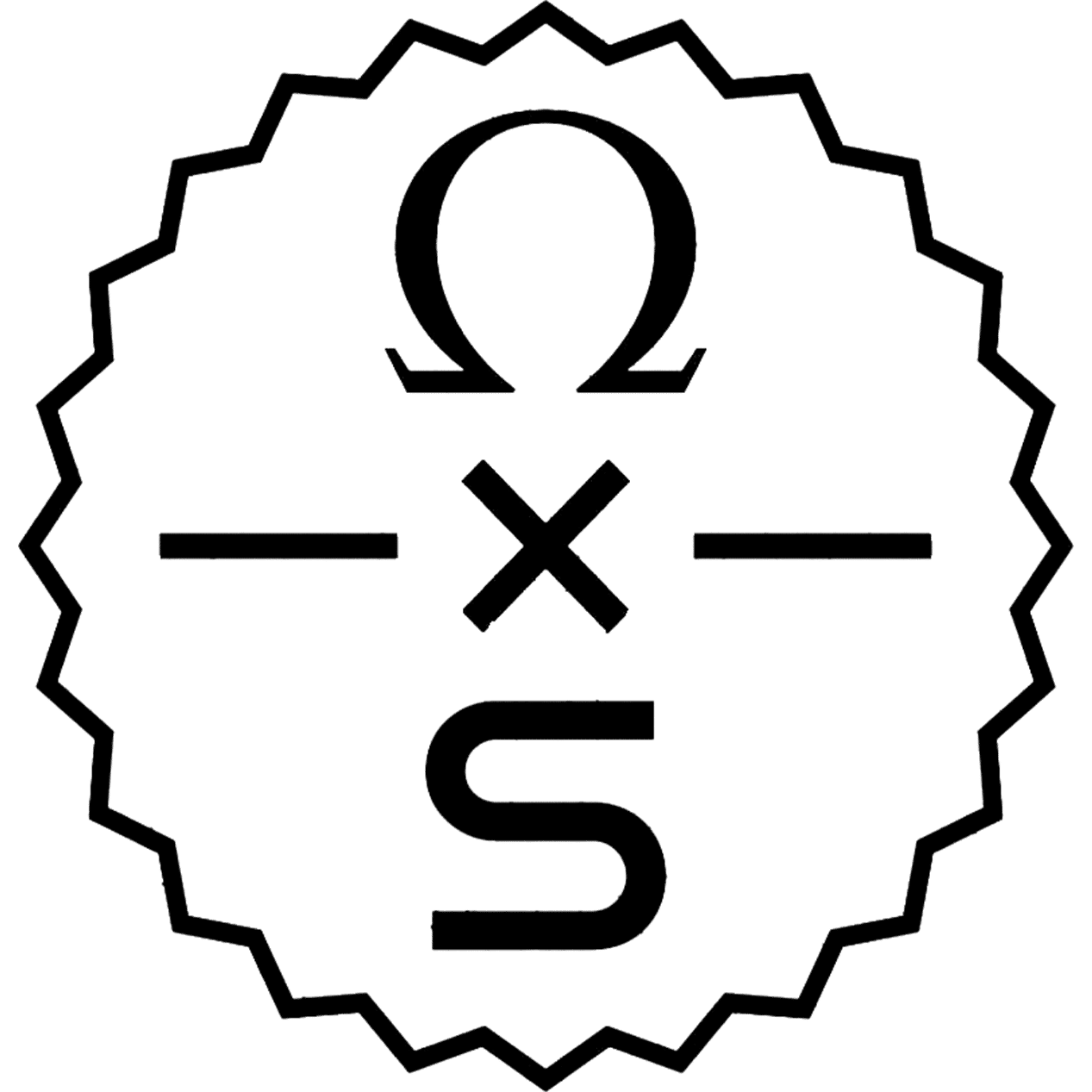
- Type: Chronograph wristwatch
- Inception: 26 March 2022
- Manufacturer: Swatch
- Website: www.swatch.com/en-us/bioceramic-moonswatch.html

The Omega x Swatch MoonSwatch, or simply MoonSwatch, is a collection of chronograph wristwatches produced by Swatch and designed in collaboration with Omega, two companies of The Swatch Group. The first 11 models were released on 26 March 2022. The watches have a 42-millimetre (1.5 in) diameter and 13-millimetre (0.5 in) thickness, and Super-LumiNova for the indexes and hands, similar to the Omega Speedmaster. It has a quartz ETA G10.212 movement. The release led to long queues in several countries, including Australia, Canada, Italy, Japan, Switzerland, and the United Kingdom. Initially, each customer was limited to purchasing two watches, but this was later reduced to one due to demand.

== Reception ==
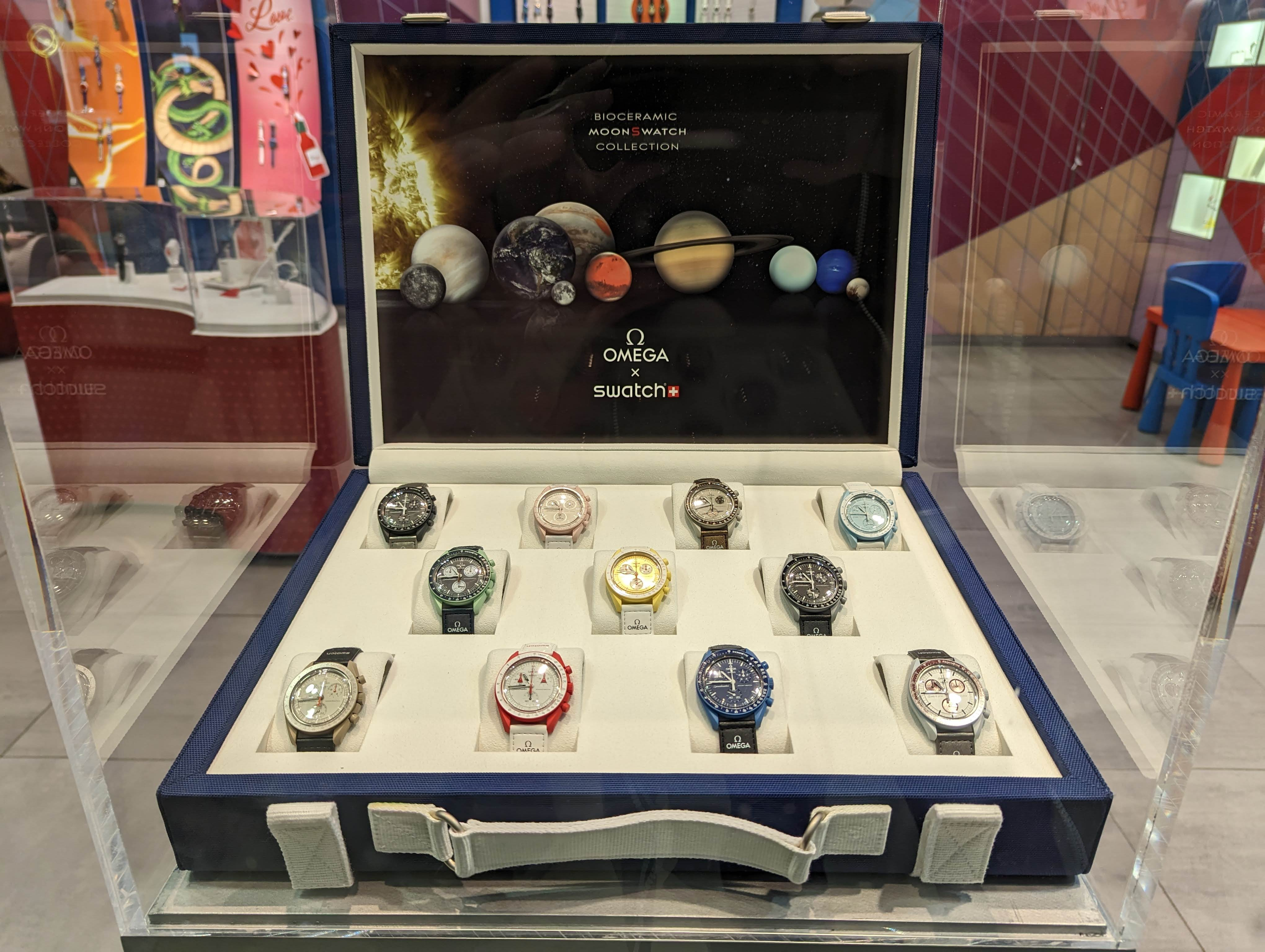
All 11 original Omega x Swatch MoonSwatch watches on display at Swatch Carrousel du Louvre in Paris

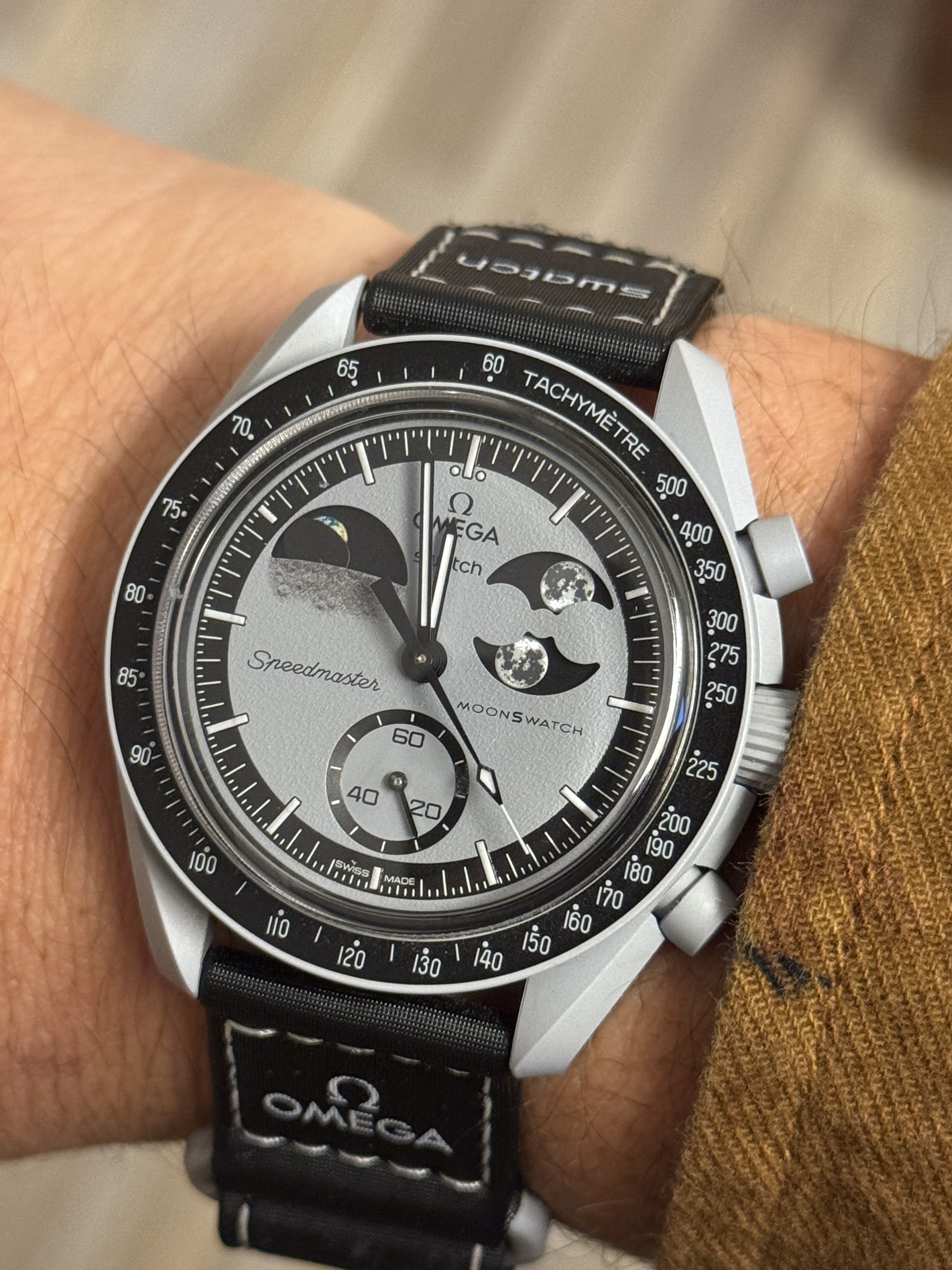
A Mission to Earthphase Watch, showing the earth as seen from the moon at upper left, and the moon as seen from earth at upper right.

The launch of the original 11 MoonSwatch models in March 2022 generated global enthusiasm. A collaboration between Swatch and Omega, the MoonSwatch collection combined Swatch's affordability and Omega's iconic Speedmaster design, creating a frenzy among collectors and casual watch enthusiasts. Long queues formed outside Swatch stores in major cities worldwide, including New York, London, Paris, Tokyo, and Zurich. The release quickly gained viral attention on social media, with many praising the collection for making an iconic design more accessible. However, demand far exceeded supply, leading to stock shortages and long-term resale markups on secondary markets. Initially, the watches were available exclusively at select Swatch boutiques, with no online sales option, further heightening their allure. This strategy drew both praise and criticism: some admired the exclusivity, while others expressed frustration over limited availability and lengthy queues. Despite these challenges, the MoonSwatch was widely celebrated for revitalizing interest in the watch industry and attracting a new generation of enthusiasts.

According to CEO Nick Hayek of Swatch Group, the release of the collaboration also boosted sales of the original Omega Speedmaster by roughly 50%.

== Models ==
#	Release date	Collection	Name	Case color	Comment
1	26 March 2022	Bioceramic MoonSwatch Collection	Mission to the Moon	Gray	Original collection
2	26 March 2022	Bioceramic MoonSwatch Collection	Mission to Mercury	Dark gray	Original collection
3	26 March 2022	Bioceramic MoonSwatch Collection	Mission to Venus	Pink	Original collection
4	26 March 2022	Bioceramic MoonSwatch Collection	Mission to Earth	Green	Original collection
5	26 March 2022	Bioceramic MoonSwatch Collection	Mission to Mars	Red	Original collection
6	26 March 2022	Bioceramic MoonSwatch Collection	Mission to Jupiter	Beige	Original collection
7	26 March 2022	Bioceramic MoonSwatch Collection	Mission to Saturn	Beige	Original collection
8	26 March 2022	Bioceramic MoonSwatch Collection	Mission to Uranus	Light blue	Original collection
9	26 March 2022	Bioceramic MoonSwatch Collection	Mission to Neptune	Dark blue	Original collection
10	26 March 2022	Bioceramic MoonSwatch Collection	Mission to Pluto	Gray	Original collection
11	26 March 2022	Bioceramic MoonSwatch Collection	Mission to the Sun	Yellow	Original collection
12	7 March 2023	Mission to Moonshine Gold	Mission to the Moon - March	Gray	Gold coated seconds hand
13	5 April 2023	Mission to Moonshine Gold	Mission to the Moon - April	Gray	Gold coated seconds hand
14	5 May 2023	Mission to Moonshine Gold	Mission to the Moon - May	Gray	Gold coated seconds hand with pink detail
15	7 June 2023	Mission to Moonshine Gold	Mission to the Moon - June	Gray	Floral pattern on gold coated seconds hand
16	25 July 2023	Mission to Moonshine Gold	Mission to the Moon - July	Gray	Strawberry pattern on gold coated seconds hand
17	1 August 2023	Mission to Moonshine Gold	Mission to the Moon - August	Gray	Swiss flag pattern on gold coated seconds hand
18	30 August 2023	Mission to Moonshine Gold	Mission to Neptune - August (Blue Moon)	Blue	Gold coated seconds hand
19	29 September 2023	Mission to Moonshine Gold	Mission to the Moon - September	Gray	Barly grain pattern on gold coated seconds hand
20	29 October 2023	Mission to Moonshine Gold	Mission to the Moon - October	Gray	Gold coated seconds hand with chronograph lollipop design
21	27 November 2023	Mission to Moonshine Gold	Mission to the Moon - November	Gray	Gold coated seconds hand with beaver-chewed trunk design
22	5 December 2023	Mission to Moonshine Gold	Mission to the Moon - December	Gray	Snowflake pattern on gold coated seconds hand
23	26 March 2024	Mission to the Moonphase	Mission to the Moonphase - Full Moon	White	Snoopy illustration in the moon phase disc
24	8 April 2024	Mission to the Moonphase	Mission to the Moonphase - New Moon	Black	Snoopy illustration in the moon phase disc
25	15 June 2024	Mission on Earth	Mission on Earth - Lava	Orange	Details on subdials inspired by 3 Omega Speedmaster models
26	15 June 2024	Mission on Earth	Mission on Earth - Polar Lights	Turquoise	Details on subdials inspired by 2 Omega Speedmaster models
27	15 June 2024	Mission on Earth	Mission on Earth - Desert	Sand	Details on subdials inspired by 2 Omega Speedmaster models
28	24 July 2024	Mission to the Super Blue Moonphase	Mission to the Super Blue Moonphase	Blue	Moon phase disc
29	2 November 2024	Mission to Earthphase	Mission to Earthphase	Grey	Moon phase and Earth phase discs
30	1 March 2025	1965	1965	Grey	Counters referring to the year of the Omega Speedmaster space-worthiness qualification by NASA
31	1 April 2025	Mission to the Pink Moonphase	Mission to the Pink Moonphase	Pink	Moon phase disc with pink accent color
32	9 August 2025	Mission to Earthphase	Moonshine Gold	Blue	Moon phase disc with a net illustration, in reference of the Sturgeon Moon and Earth phase discs with Snoopy illustration
33	8 September 2025	Mission to Earthphase	Moonshine Gold	Blue	Moon phase disc with a popcorn illustration, in reference of the Full Corn Moon and Earth phase discs with Snoopy illustration
34	7 October 2025	Mission to Earthphase	Moonshine Gold	Blue	Moon phase disc "with a human hand pointing directly at the wearer" illustration, in reference to the Hunter's Moon and Earth phase disc with Snoopy illustration
35	5 November 2025	Mission to Earthphase	Moonshine Gold	Blue	Moon phase disc "reimagined as a beaver-bitten moon", in reference to the Beaver Moon and Earth phase disc with Snoopy illustration
36	4 December 2025	Mission to Earthphase	Moonshine Gold	White	Moon phase disc with a snow flake illustration, in reference to the Cold Moon and Earth phase disc with Snoopy illustration
