= Omega SA =

Swiss watchmaker

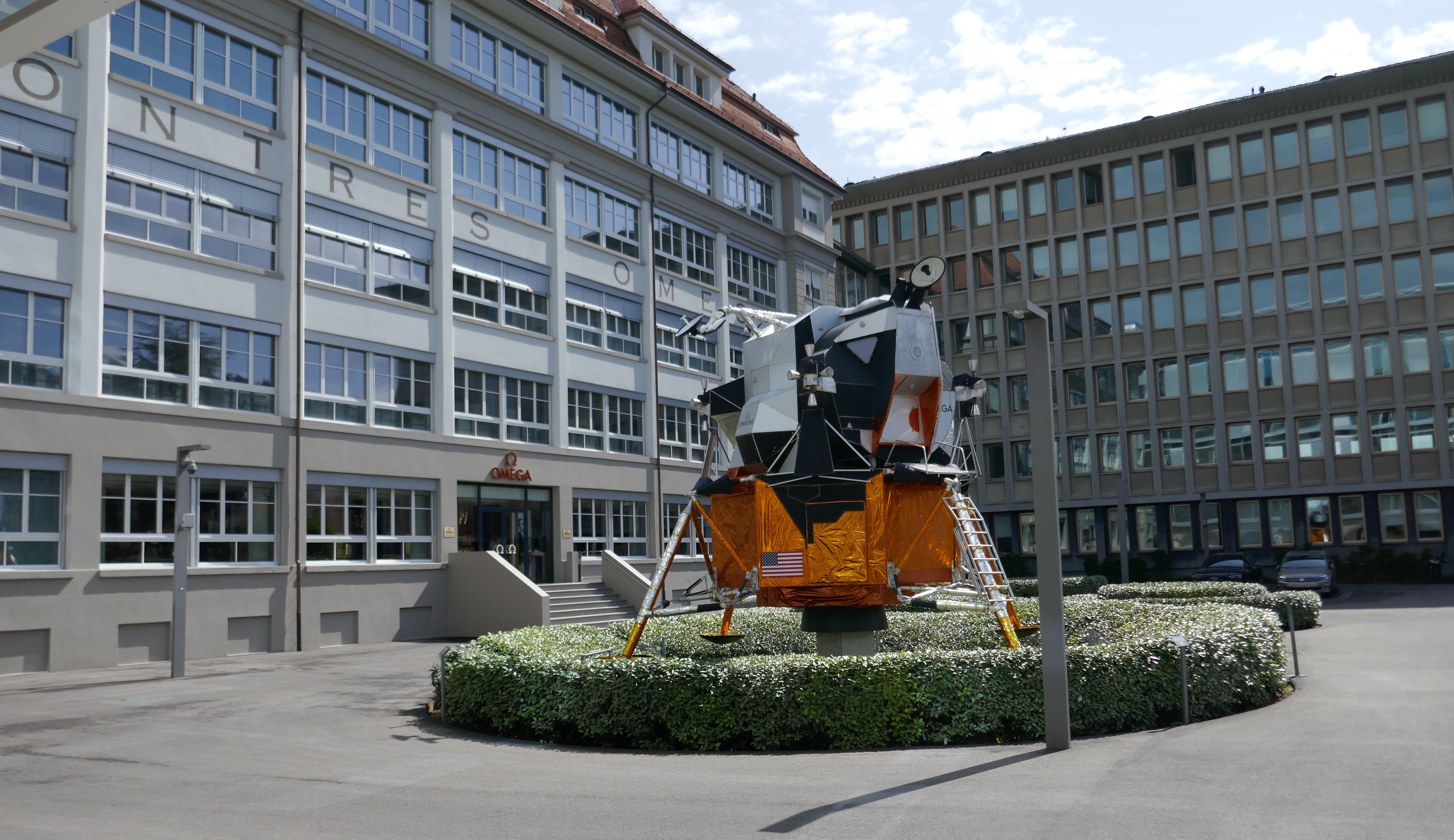
- Omega's headquarters in Biel/Bienne, Switzerland
- Native name: Omega Société Anonyme (SA)
- Formerly: La Generale Watch Co. (1848–1903); Louis Brandt et Frère-Omega Watch & Co. (1903–1984)
- Type: Subsidiary
- Industry: Watchmaking
- Founded: 1848; 178 years ago in La Chaux-de-Fonds, Switzerland
- Founder: Louis Brandt
- Headquarters: Biel/Bienne, Switzerland; 47.14362°N 7.25998°E
- Area served: Worldwide
- Key people: Raynald Aeschlimann (president)
- Products: Watches, timing devices and systems
- Parent: The Swatch Group
- Website: omegawatches.com

Omega SA is a Swiss luxury watchmaker based in Biel/Bienne, Switzerland. Founded by Louis Brandt in La Chaux-de-Fonds in 1848, the company formerly operated as Louis Brandt et Fils until incorporating the name Omega in 1903, becoming Louis Brandt et Frère-Omega Watch & Co. In 1984, the company officially changed its name to Omega SA and opened its museum in Biel/Bienne to the public. Omega is a subsidiary of the Swatch Group.

Britain's Royal Flying Corps used Omega watches in 1917 for its combat units, followed by the U.S. Army in 1918, and NASA in 1969 for Apollo 11. The Omega Speedmaster Moonwatch is marketed as the first watch worn on the Moon, becoming one of the watchmaker's most iconic models.

Omega is the current official timekeeper of the Olympics, having first done so in 1932, in addition to being the timekeeper of the America's Cup yacht race. Omega is frequently considered to be a direct competitor of fellow Swiss brand Rolex, and the new models from each brand are often directly compared by many publications and watch enthusiasts.

== History ==
=== Early history ===
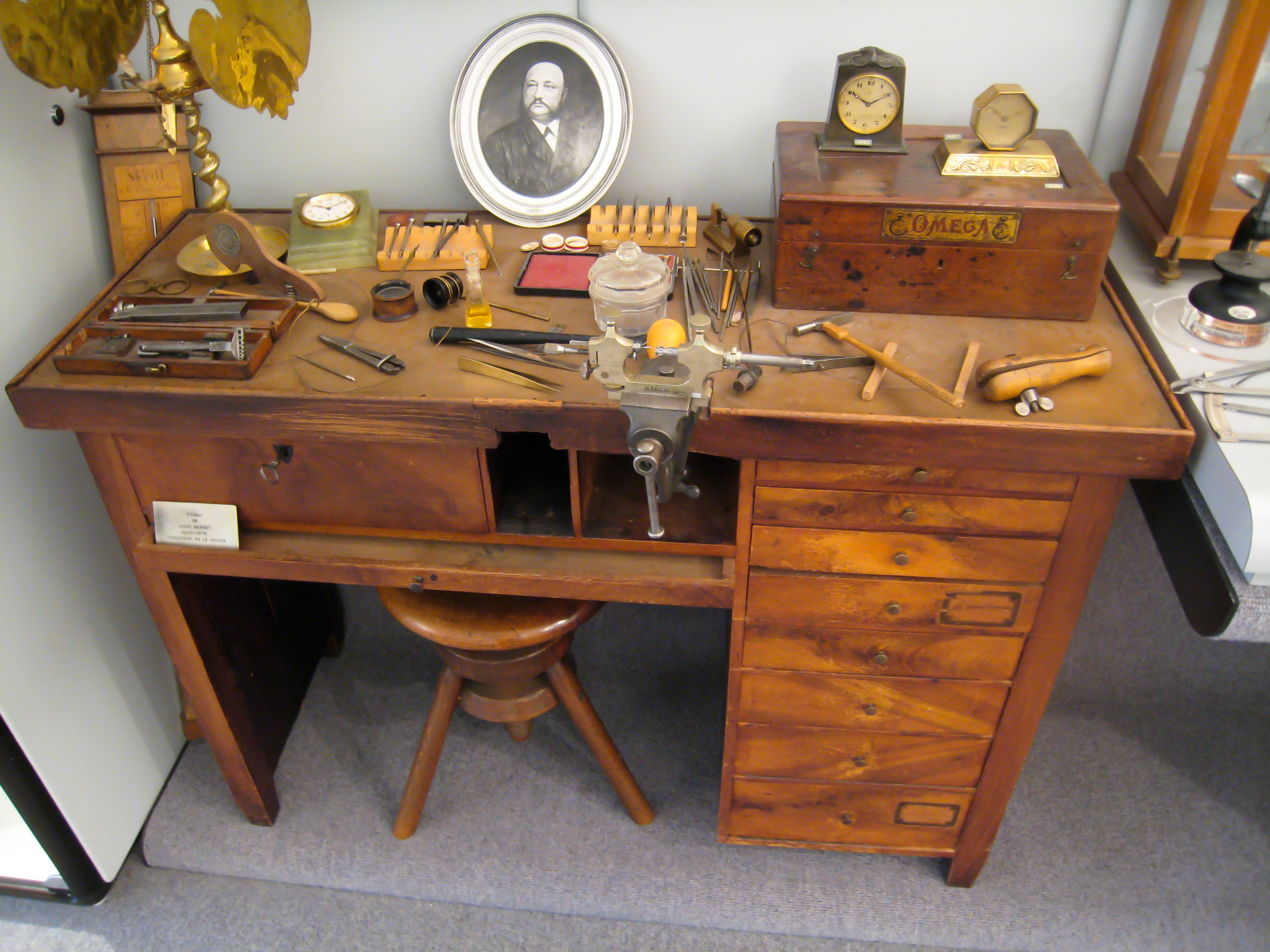
The workbench of Louis Brandt with a photograph of the founder

In 1848, Louis Brandt founded the company that would become Omega in La Chaux-de-Fonds, Switzerland. He assembled key-wound precision pocket watches from parts supplied by local craftsmen. He sold his watches from Italy to Scandinavia by way of England, his chief market. In 1877, his sons Louis-Paul and César joined him, and the company name was changed to Louis Brandt & Fils. In 1894, his two sons Louis-Paul and César developed their own in-house manufacturing and total production control system that allowed component parts to be interchangeable. Watches developed with these techniques were marketed under the Omega brand of Louis Brandt & Frere. By 1903, the success of the Omega brand led Louis Brandt & Frere to rename their company to the Omega Watch Co.

=== Re-organization ===
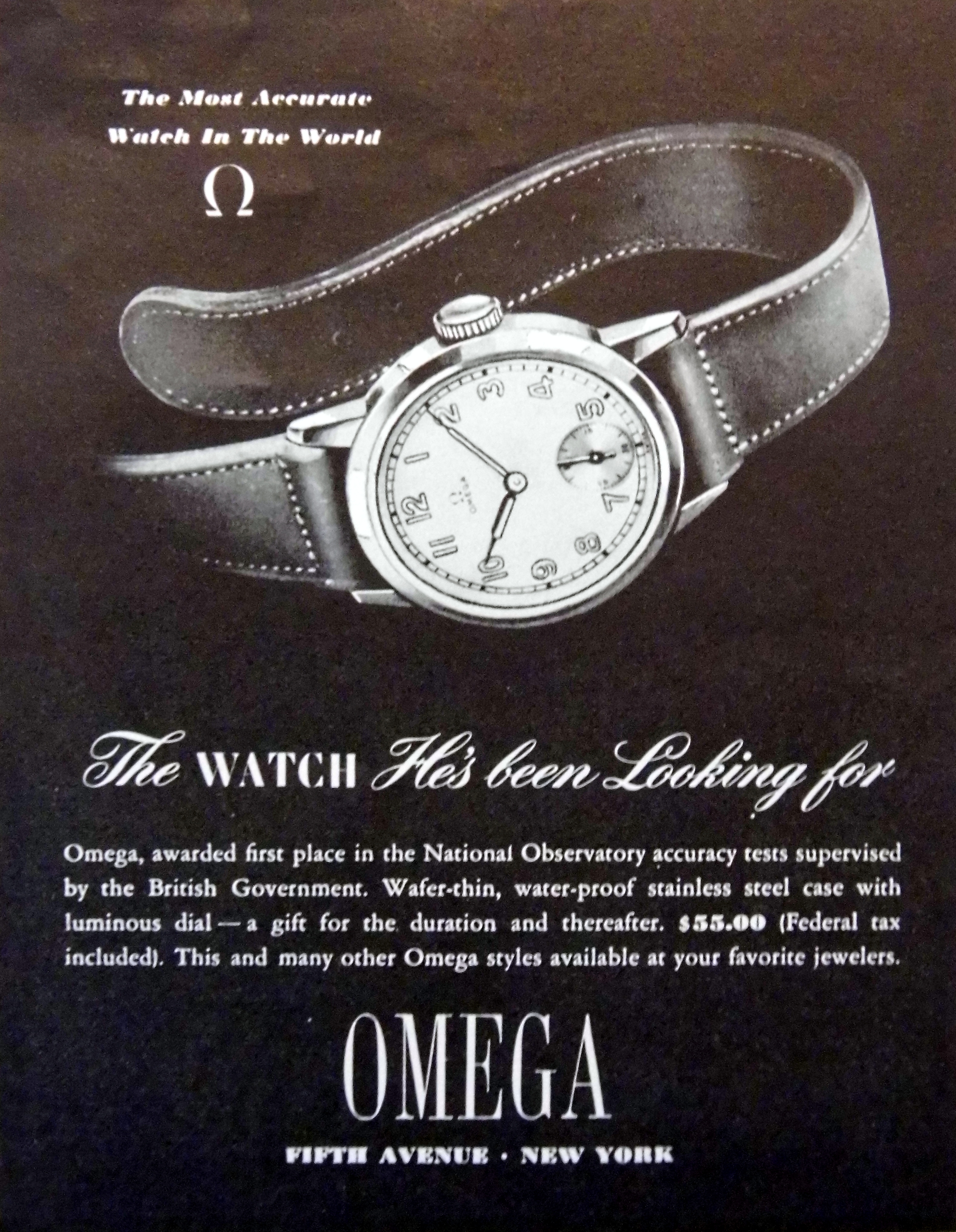
Omega watch ad in Life magazine, December 1942

Louis-Paul and César Brandt both died in 1903, leaving one of Switzerland's largest watch companies — with 240,000 watches produced annually and employing 800 people — in the hands of four young people, the oldest of whom, Paul-Emile Brandt, was not yet 24. The economic difficulties brought on by the First World War led Paul-Emile Brandt to work in 1925 towards the union of Omega and Tissot, then to their merger in 1930 into the group SSIH, Geneva.

Under Brandt's leadership and Joseph Reiser's from 1955, the SSIH Group continued to grow and multiply, absorbing or creating some fifty companies, including Lanco and Lemania, manufacturer of the most famous Omega chronograph movements. By the 1970s, SSIH had become Switzerland's top producer of finished watches and third in the world. Up to this time, Omega outsold Rolex, its main Swiss rival in the luxury watch segment, in the race for "King of Swiss Watch brands", although Rolex sold at a higher price point. Omega tended to be more revolutionary and more professionally focused, while Rolex watches were more ‘evolutionary’ and famous for their mechanical pieces and branding.

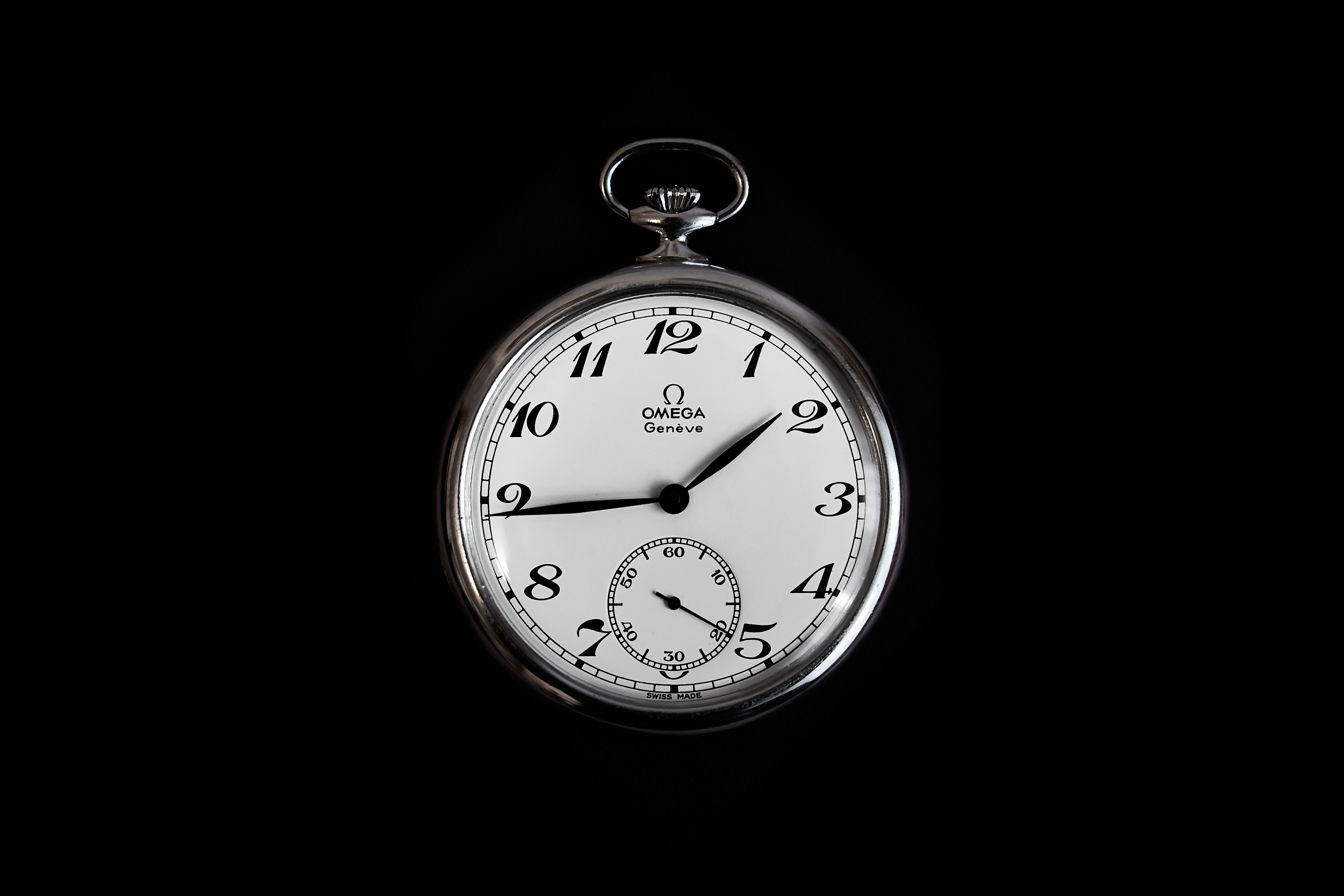
Pocket watch, made in the 1970s

While Omega and Rolex had dominated in the pre-quartz era, this changed in the 1970s during the quartz crisis, when Japanese watch manufacturers, such as Seiko and Citizen, rose to dominance due to their use of quartz movements. In response, Rolex continued concentrating on its expensive mechanical chronometers where its expertise lay (though it did have some experimentation in quartz), while Omega tried to compete in the quartz watch market with its own quartz movements.

=== Recent development ===
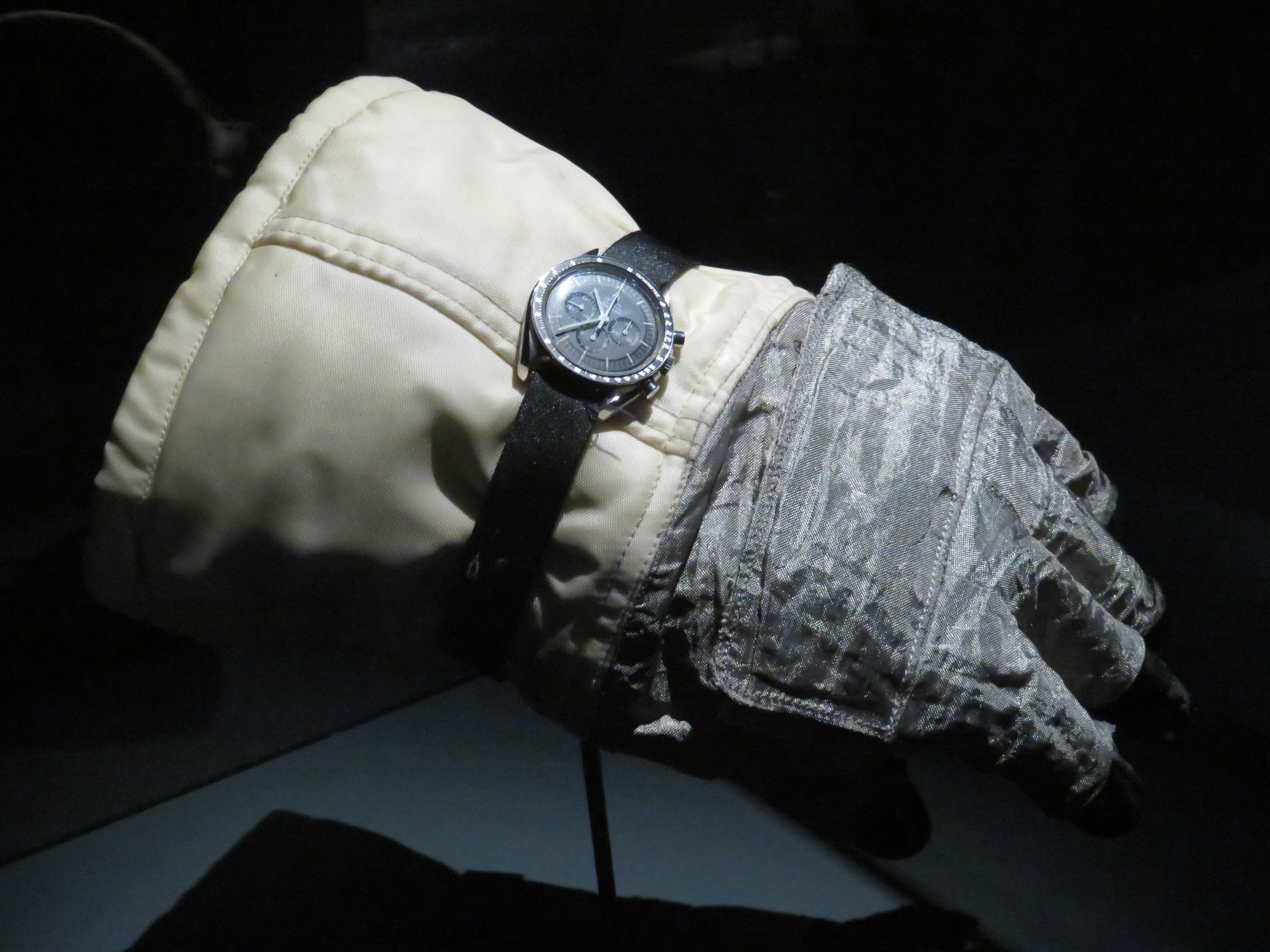
Training glove from the Apollo program with Omega watch in Omega museum in Biel

Weakened by the severe monetary crisis and recession of 1975 to 1980, SSIH was bailed out by banks in 1981. During this period, Seiko expressed interest in acquiring Omega, but nothing came of the talks.

Switzerland's other watch making giant Allgemeine Schweizerische Uhrenindustrie AG (ASUAG), supplier of a large range of Swiss movements and watch assemblies, was in economic difficulty. It was the principal manufacturer of Ébauche (unfinished movements) and owner, through their sub-holding company General Watch Co (GWC), of various other Swiss watch brands including Longines, Rado, Certina, Hamilton Watch Company and Mido. After drastic financial restructuring, the R&D departments of ASUAG and SSIH merged production operations at the ETA complex in Granges. The two companies completely merged forming ASUAG-SSIH, a holding company, in 1983.

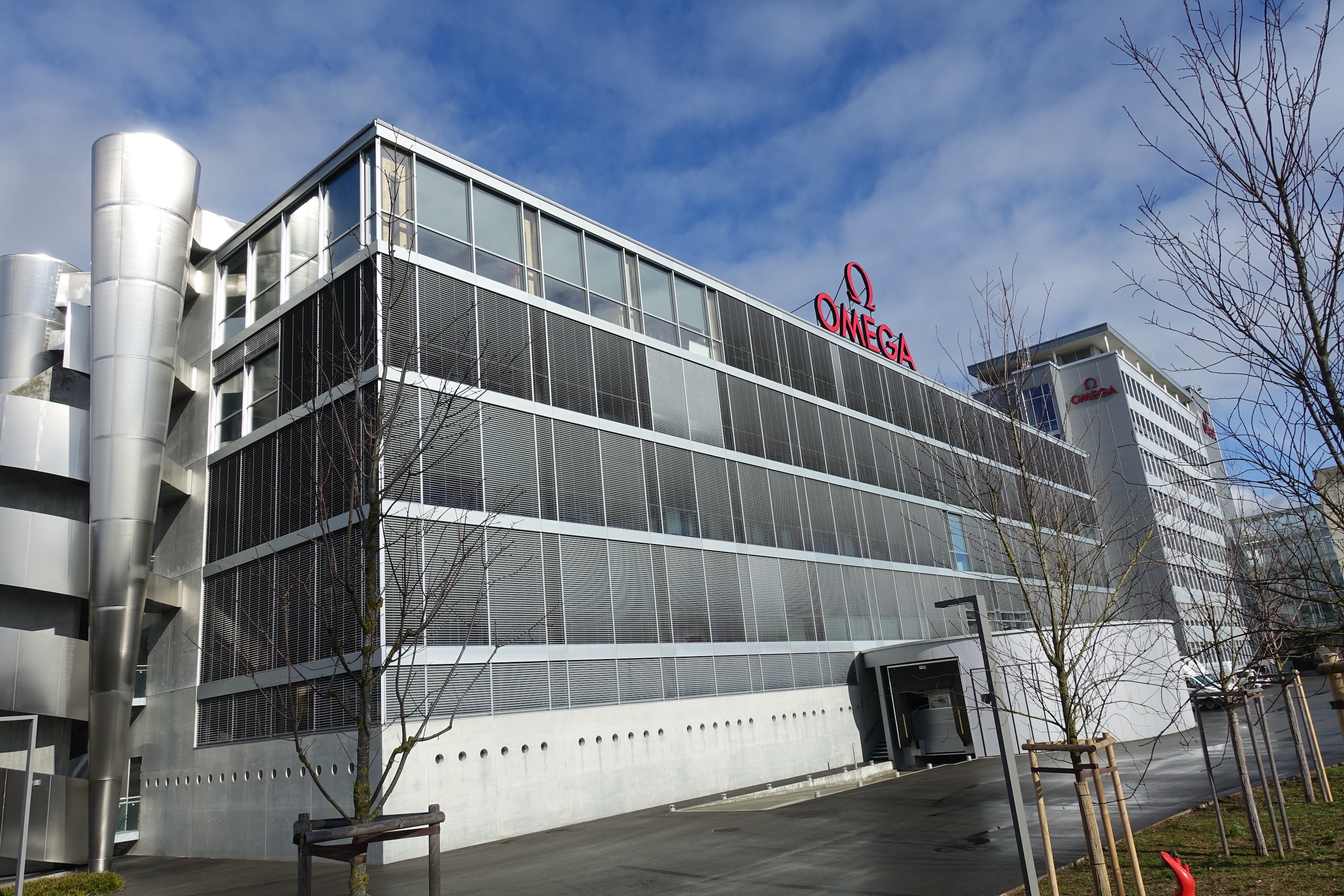
Omega production and logistics building in Biel, Switzerland

Two years later, the holding company was taken over by a group of private investors led by Nicolas Hayek. Renamed Société de Microélectronique et d'Horlogerie (SMH), the new group over the next decade proceeded to become one of the top watch producers in the world. In 1998 it became The Swatch Group, which now manufactures Omega and other brands such as Blancpain, Swatch, and Breguet.

Omega experienced a resurgence with advertisements that focused on product placement strategies, such as in the James Bond 007 films; the character had previously worn a Rolex Submariner but switched to the Omega Seamaster Diver 300M with GoldenEye (1995), and later an Omega Planet Ocean and Aqua Terra. Omega adopted many elements of Rolex's business model (i.e. premium pricing, tighter controls of dealer pricing, increasing advertising, etc.), which succeeded in increasing Omega's market share and name recognition to become a direct competitor to Rolex.

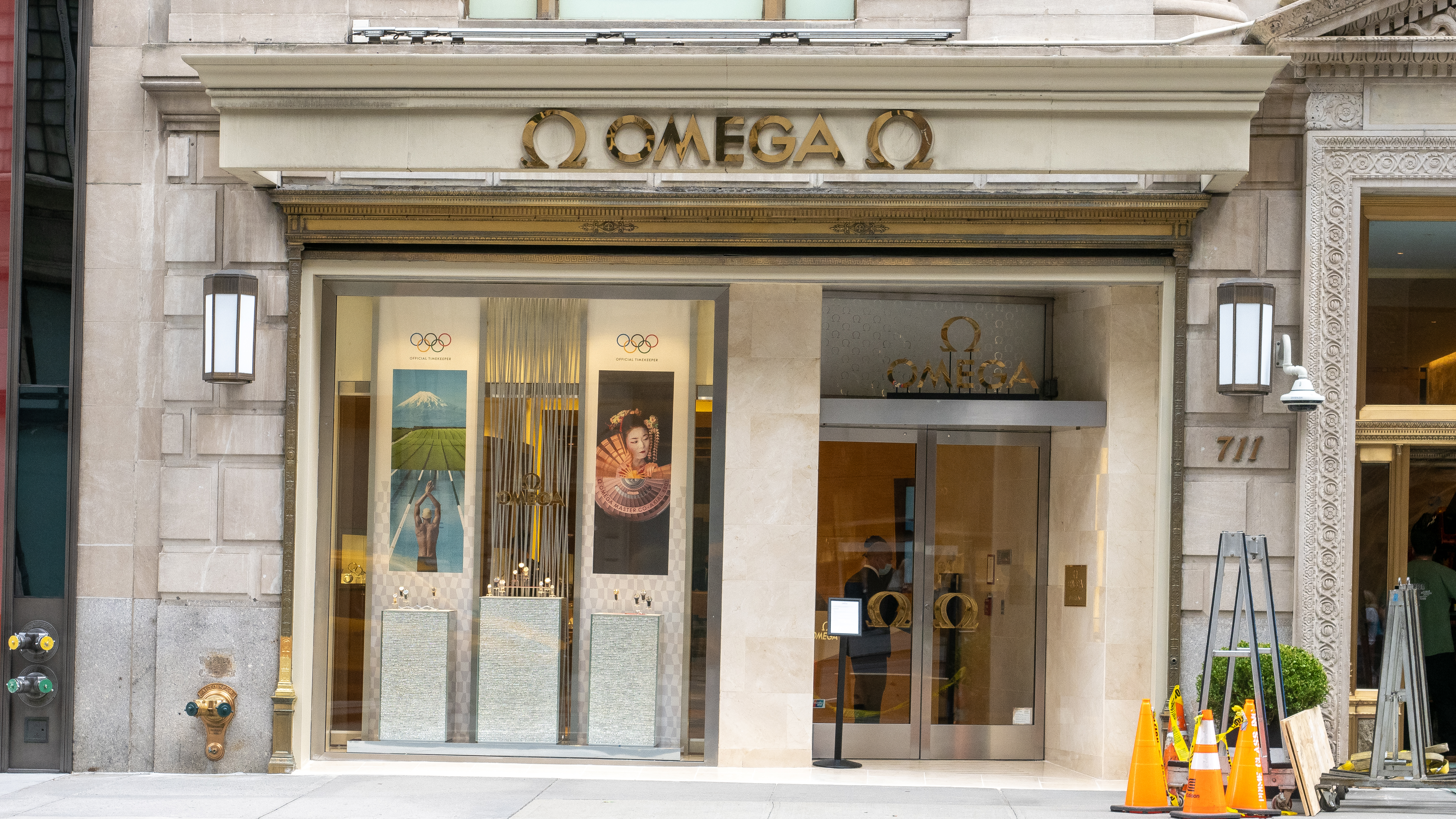
Omega boutique on Fifth Avenue in Manhattan, New York

In 2019, Omega licensed its name and branding to Marcolin for a collection of men's and women's optical frames and sunglasses.

In March 2022, Omega collaborated with sibling company Swatch, both of which are owned by The Swatch Group, to release a budget version of its iconic Omega Speedmaster Moonwatch. The so-called "MoonSwatch", available in 11 colors, is made of bioceramic (a mixture of ceramic and castor oil) and priced at $260 / £207, well below the $5,250 price (as of March 2022) of the least expensive Omega Speedmaster Moonwatch.

As of 2024, Omega's boutique network includes more than 350 stores across the World.

== Watch manufacturing ==
=== Notable inventions and patents ===
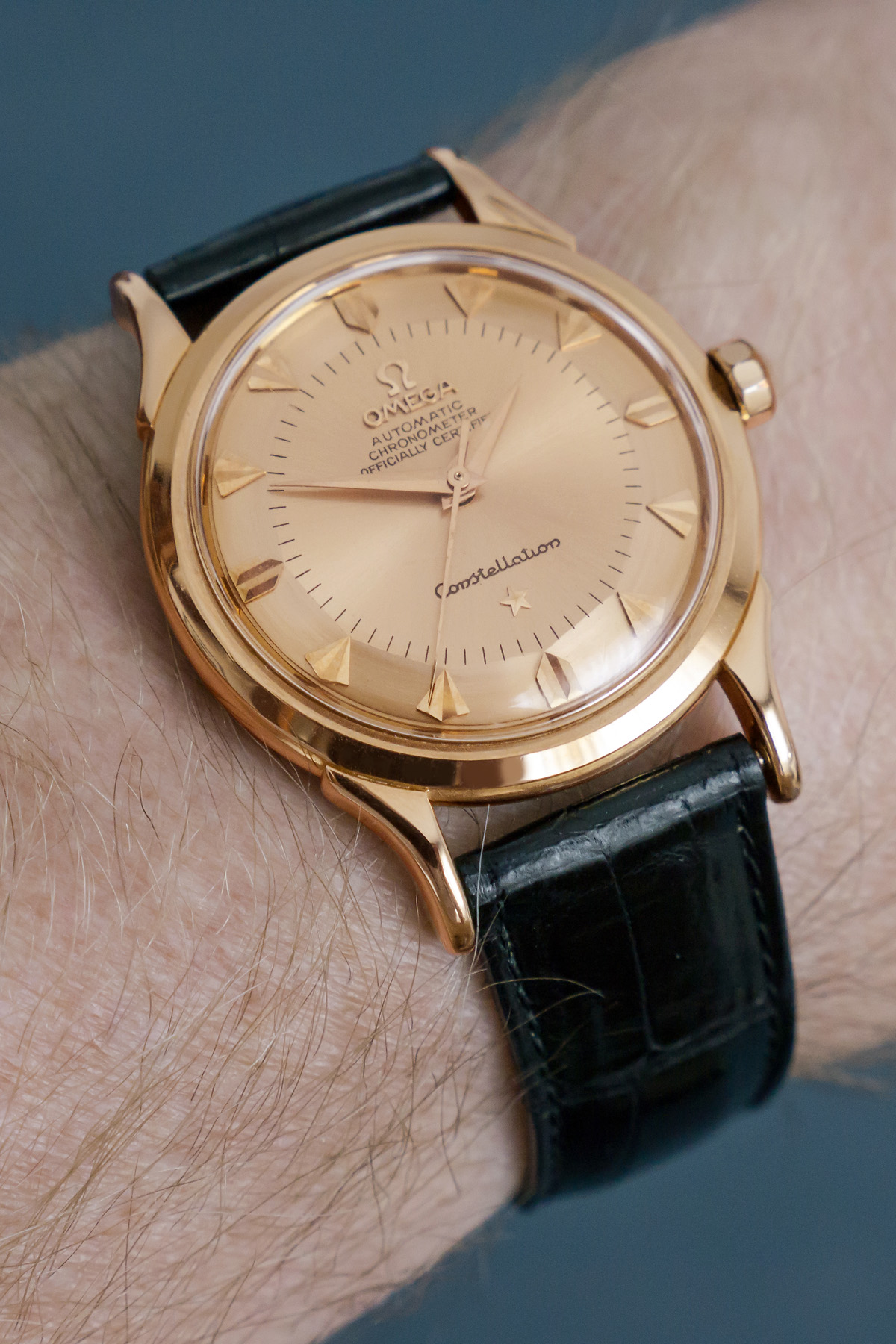
18k rose gold Omega Constellation, 1958

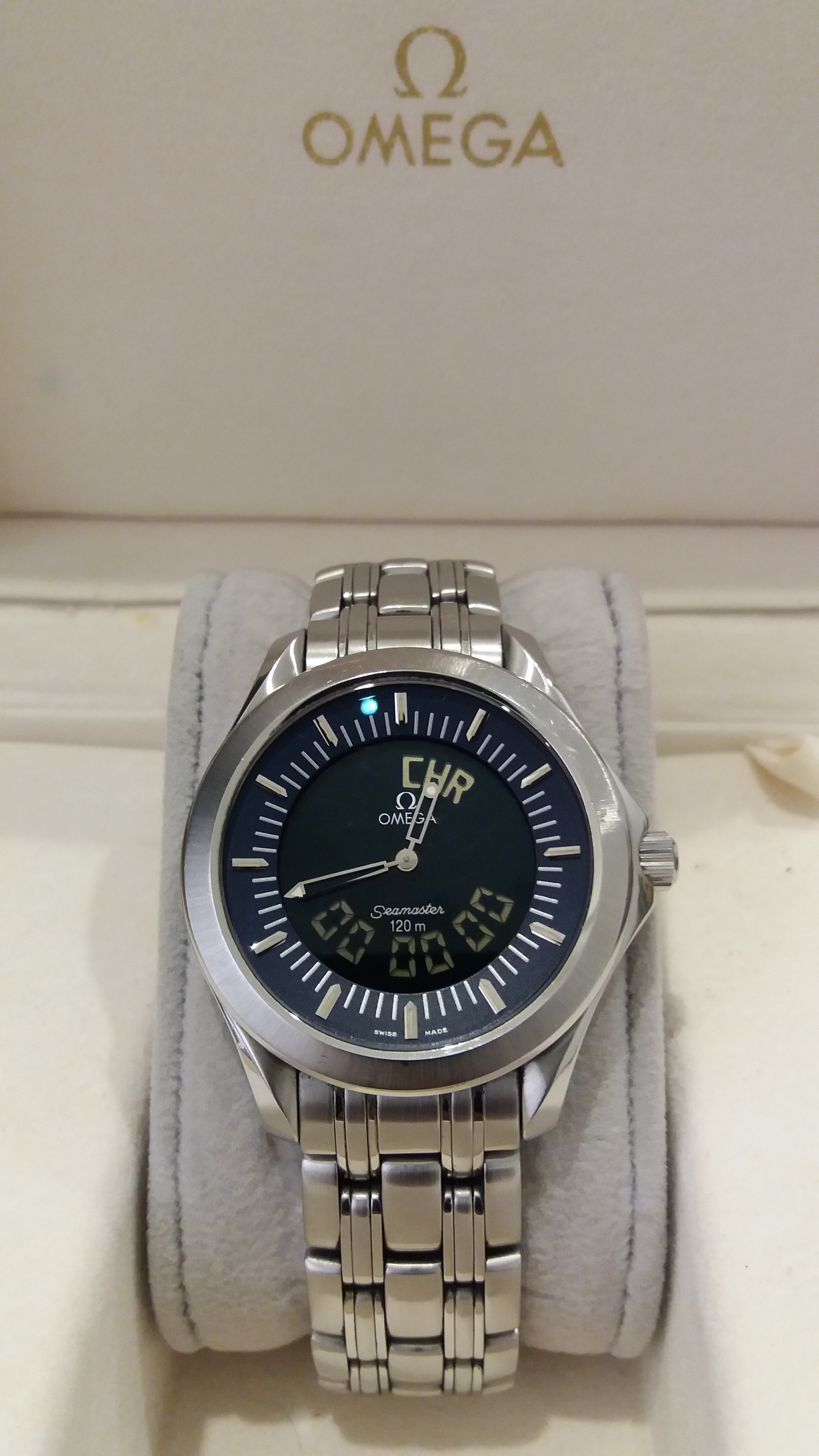
Seamaster 120M Analog-Digital "Multifunction" was introduced in 1998 and discontinued after few years, fitted with Omega, Cal. 1665.

- In 1892, Louis Brandt, the founder of Omega, manufactured the world's first minute repeating wristwatch in collaboration with Audemars Piguet, which provided the minute-repeating movement. The 18K-gold watch is now kept in the Omega Museum in Biel/Bienne, Switzerland.
- In 1947, Omega created the first tourbillon wristwatch calibre in the world with the 30I. Twelve of these movements were made, intended for inclusion in the observatory trials in Geneva, Neuchâtel and Kew-Teddington, and they were known as the Omega Observatory Tourbillons. Unlike conventional Tourbillon movements whose cages rotate once per minute, the 30I's cage rotated one time each seven and a half minutes. In 1949, one of these delivered the best results ever recorded by a wristwatch up to that time. A year later, Omega broke its own record in the Geneva Observatory Trials of 1950.
- In 1999, after the successful development of Calibre 2500, Omega made history by introducing the first mass-produced watch incorporating the coaxial escapement — invented by English watchmaker George Daniels. Considered by many to be one of the more significant horological advances since the invention of the lever escapement, the coaxial escapement functions with virtually no lubrication, thereby eliminating one of the shortcomings of the traditional lever escapement. Through using radial friction instead of sliding friction at the impulse surfaces the coaxial escapement significantly reduces friction, theoretically resulting in longer service intervals and greater accuracy over time.
- On January 24, 2007, Omega unveiled its new Calibres 8500 and 8501, two coaxial (25,200 bph) movements created exclusively from inception by Omega.
- On January 17, 2013, Omega announced the creation of the world's first movement that is resistant to magnetic fields greater than 1.5 tesla (15,000 Gauss), far exceeding the levels of magnetic resistance achieved by any previous movement - a similar movement was used by Daniel Craig as James Bond, though the official collectors watch was labelled as resistant to 15,007 Gauss in honor of the fictional secret agent's codename. Most anti-magnetic watches utilize a soft iron - Faraday cage which distributes electromagnetism in such a way that it cancels the effect on the movement contained within. This type of anti-magnetic case required de-magnetizing procedures of the case. Omega has instead built a movement of non-ferrous materials eliminating the need for such a cage and providing a far greater resistance to magnetic fields eliminating necessity of additional maintenance.
- In 2015, they introduced the Master Chronometer Certification, which denotes that along with a COSC (Official Swiss Chronometer Testing Institute) certification, a movement has also passed a series of eight tests set out by METAS (The Federal Institute of Metrology). Master Chronometer watches have a minimum water-resistance rating of 100 metres (330 ft) (the 2022 Speedmaster '57 is a Master Chronometer with 50 metres (160 ft) water-resistance), a minimum power reserve rating of 60 hours, an accuracy rating of 0/+5 seconds per day, and are resistant to magnetic fields of 15,000 gauss. The Master Chronometer Certification debuted on the Globemaster but they now offer it across many more of its watch collections.

=== Observatory trials ===
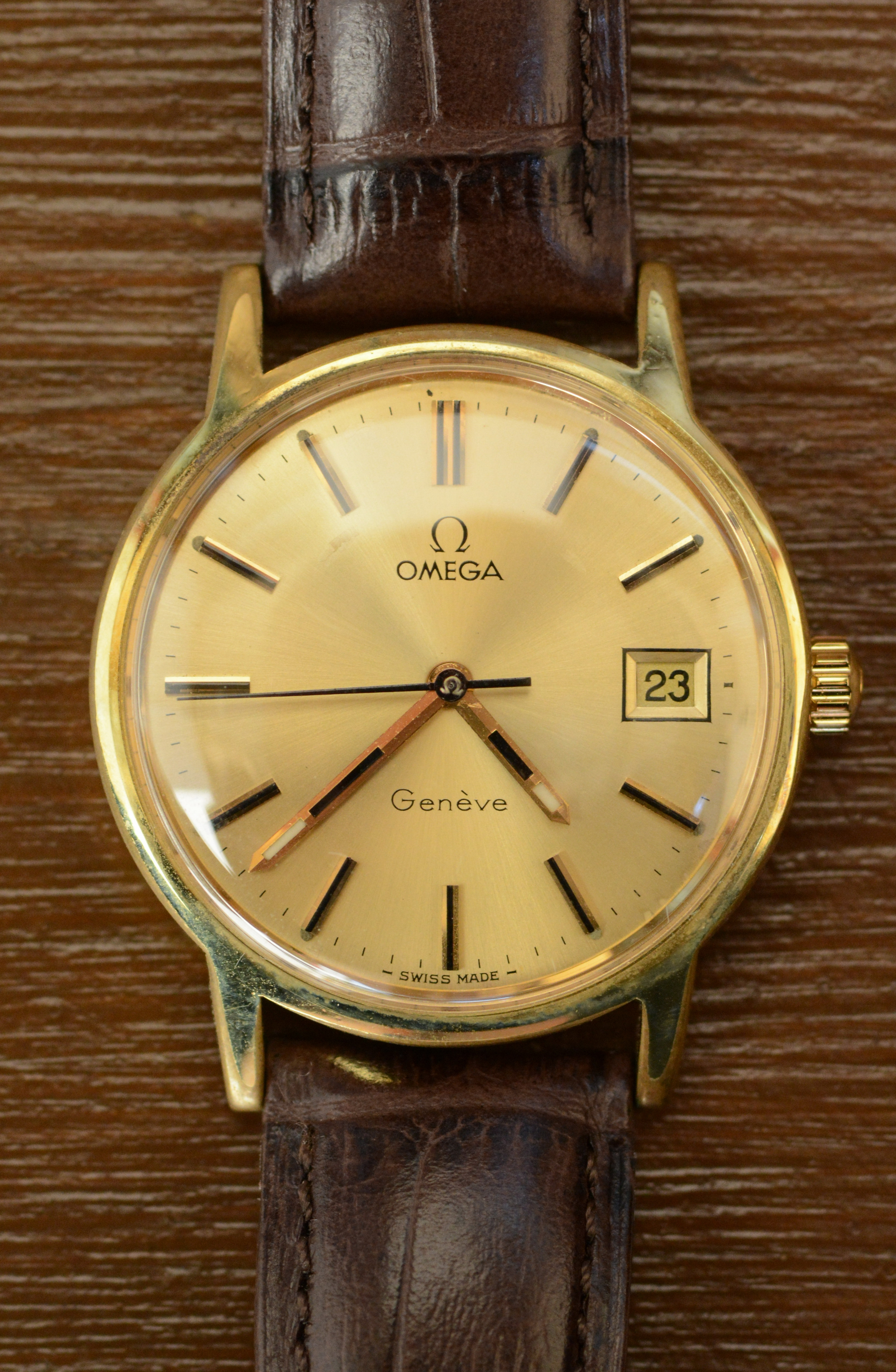
Omega Genève Cal. 613

Observatory trials focused on the science of Chronometry and the ability to make chronometers measure time precisely. Only Patek Philippe and Omega participated every year in the trials. Omega's performances at these competitions garnered the company a reputation of precision and innovation.

For more than a decade (1958–1969), Omega was the largest manufacturer of COSC chronometers. Omega developed the slogan "Omega – Exact time for life" in 1931 based on its historical performance at the Observatory trials. Omega's early prowess in designing and regulating timing movements was made possible by the company's incorporation of new chronometric innovations.

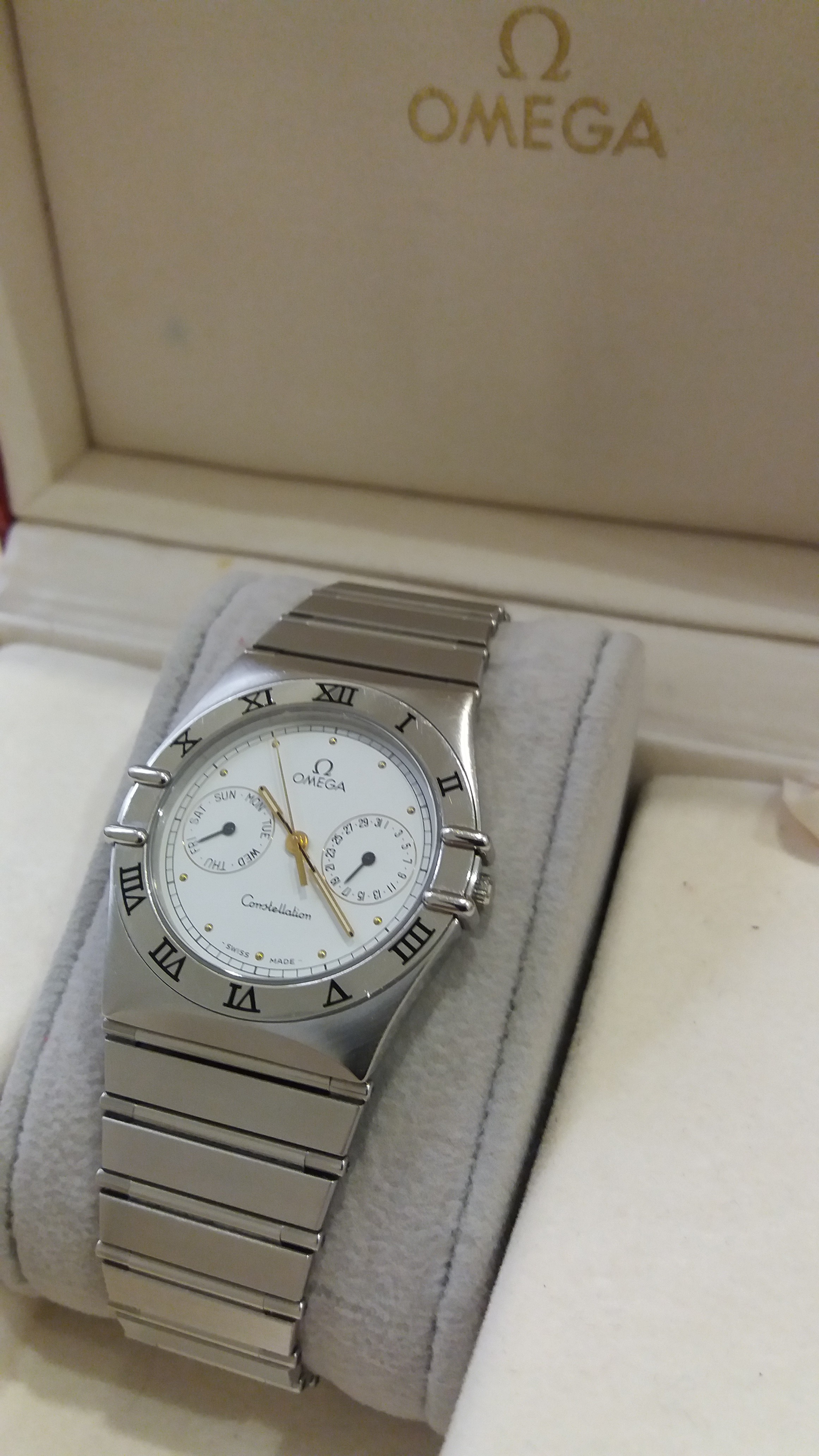
The distinctive Omega Constellation day-date model of 1980's generation that was known as "Manhattan", equipped with quartz movement, Cal. 1444

Notable dates for the Omega precision records:

- 1894: Creation of the 19 caliber named Omega. The company was renamed Omega from Louis Brandt et Frères in 1903. Omega participates for the first time at observatory trials in Neuenburg, Albert Willemin, Omega's first "regleur de précision", regulated the movement
- 1919: 1st Prize at observatory trials in Neuenburg with a 21 caliber, this caliber was slightly modified to become the Cal. 47.7
- 1922: Omega participates for the first time at observatory trials in Kew-Teddington, achieves 3rd place
- 1925: 1st place at observatory trials in Kew-Teddington with a Cal. 47.7 (95.9 of 100 points ex aequo with Ulysse Nardin), movement regulated by Gottlob Ith
- 1930: 1st place at observatory trials in Kew-Teddington (96.3 of 100 points ex aequo with Movado), movement regulated by Alfred Jaccard
- 1931: Omega achieves 1st place in all 6 categories at observatory trials in Geneva, movements, regulated by Alfred Jaccard
- 1933: A Cal. 47.7 regulated by Alfred Jaccard achieved the precision record at observatory trials at Kew-Teddington, achieved 97.4/100 points
- 1936: Another Cal. 47.7 regulated by Alfred Jaccard achieved the precision record of 97.8/100 points at Kew-Teddington, record not broken until 1965
- 1937: 1st place at Kew-Teddington with 97.3 points
- 1938: 1st place at Kew-Teddington with 97.7 points
- 1940: 1st place with Cal. 30mm at Kew Teddington, movement regulated by Alfred Jaccard
- 1945: 1st place with 30mm caliber at the observatory in Geneva, movement regulated by Alfred Jaccard
- 1948: 1st place at observatory trial in Neuenburg for 30mm caliber
- 1950: 1st place for tourbillon Cal. 30I at Geneva Trials, regulated by Alfred Jaccard
- 1951: 1st place at the observatory trials in Geneva
- 1952: 1st place at the observatory trials in Geneva
- 1954: New record in Geneva by Gottlob Ith
- 1955: Two new records at Neuenburg by Gottlob Ith
- 1956: Two 1st places at observatory trials in Neuenburg
- 1958: New record in Geneva movements regulated by Joseph Ory
- 1959: Two records in Neuenburg and one new record in Geneva, movement regulated by Joseph Ory
- 1960: One new record in Geneva, one new record in Neuenburg, and 1st place in Neuenburg, movement regulated by Joseph Ory
- 1961: Two new records in Geneva by Joseph Ory, the first four places for the 'single pieces' category in Geneva are occupied by Omega
- 1962: 2nd, 3rd and 4th places for Omega
- 1963: Two 1st places in Geneva and Neuenburg, movement regulated by Joseph Ory and André Brielmann
- 1964: New record in Neuchatel by Joseph Ory
- 1965: Omega occupies 2nd to 9th places
- 1966: Three new records for Omega (two in Neuenburg, one in Geneva)
- 1968: Omega enters with a tuning fork, movement regulated by André Brielmann for a new record
- 1969: Two new records for the tuning fork, movement regulated by André Brielmann
- 1970: One new record for the tuning fork, movement regulated by André Brielmann
- 1971: Two new records for the tuning fork, movement regulated by André Brielmann
- 1974: Omega Marine Chronometer certified as the world's first Marine Chronometer wristwatch, accurate to 12 seconds per year

=== Reference Numbers ===
Before 1962 it was a simple alphanumeric code of two letters followed by four digits. Between 1962 and 2007 Omega used the Mapics system, consisting of two letters followed by either six or seven numbers. The PIC system started in 1988, running concurrently with Mapics, and featured an arrangement of eight numbers in three groups (XXXX.XX.XX).

Finally, today we have the PIC14 structure, with 14 digits in six groups.

== Military watches ==
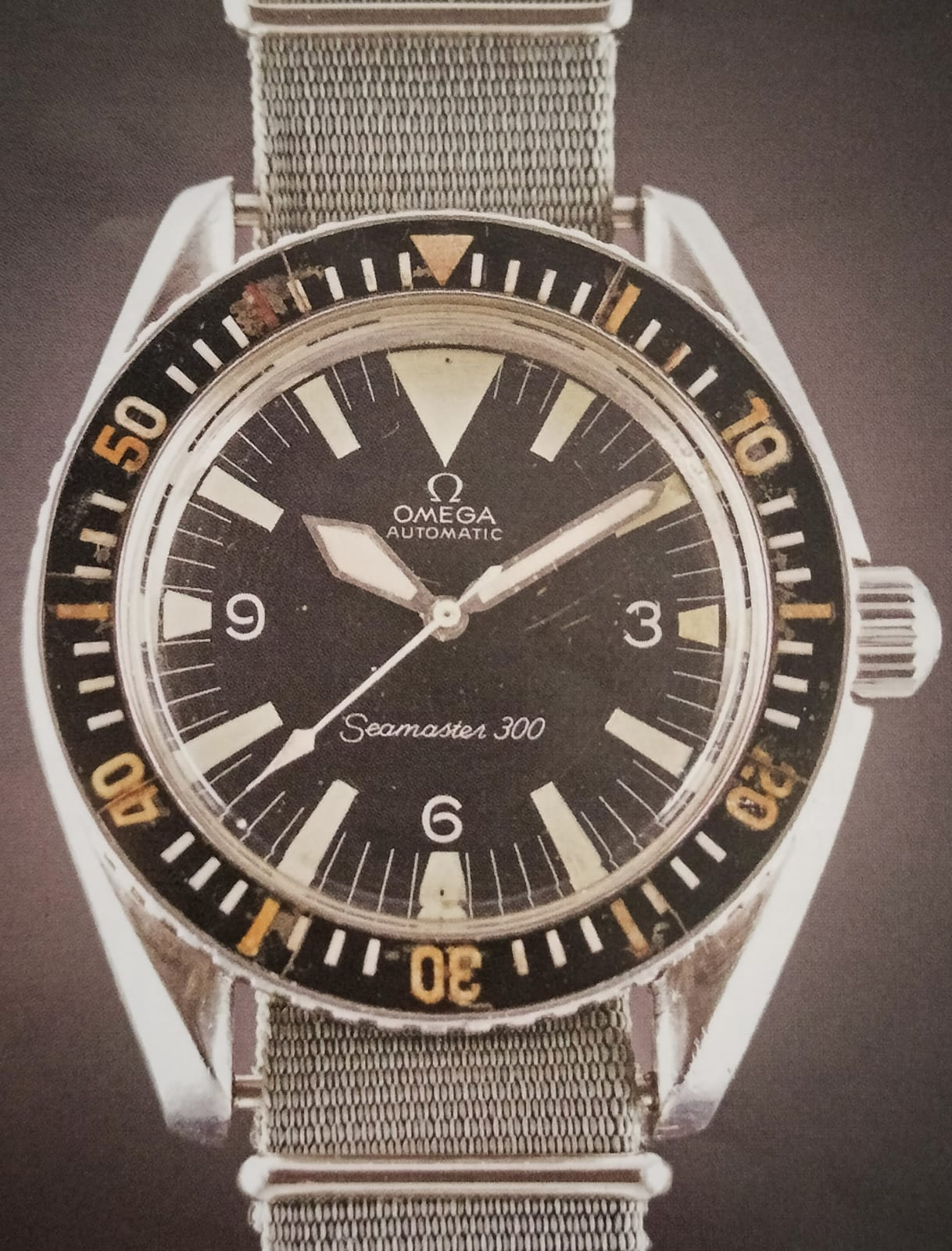
An Omega Seamaster 300 military-issued watch

Omega was one of the 12 'Dirty Dozen' manufacturers who provided watches to the British Ministry of Defence during World War II, manufacturing 25,000 watches.

From 1967 until 1971, the Royal Navy and Army issued Seamaster 300s to specialist units.

=== Unit Watch Program ===
Today, Omega operates a Unit Watch Program offering special edition versions of the Seamaster and Speedmaster to elite military units.

== Notable models ==
- The Omega wristwatch Ref. H6582/D96043 (1960) once owned by Elvis Presley was sold in auction by Phillips for US$1.812 million in Geneva on 1 May 2018, making it the most expensive Omega timepiece ever sold at auction. The watch was manufactured in 1960 and was sold by Tiffany & Co. in 1961. The watch was presented to Elvis Presley as a gift from RCA Records on 25 February 1961, to commemorate his remarkable achievement of having sold 75 million records. Petros Protopapas, the director of Omega Museum, later confirmed that the museum was the winning bidder.
- The Omega Stainless Steel Tourbillon 301 was sold in auction by Phillips for around US$1.43 million (1,428,500 CHF) in Geneva on 12 November 2017. It was then the most expensive Omega timepiece ever sold at auction.
- In March 1965, the Omega Speedmaster was declared “Flight Qualified for all Manned Spaced Missions." On 20 July 1969, Buzz Aldrin stepped onto the Moon wearing his Omega Speedmaster watch. The model of the first watch on the Moon is the Omega Speedmaster 105.012.

== Historic events ==
=== Space exploration ===
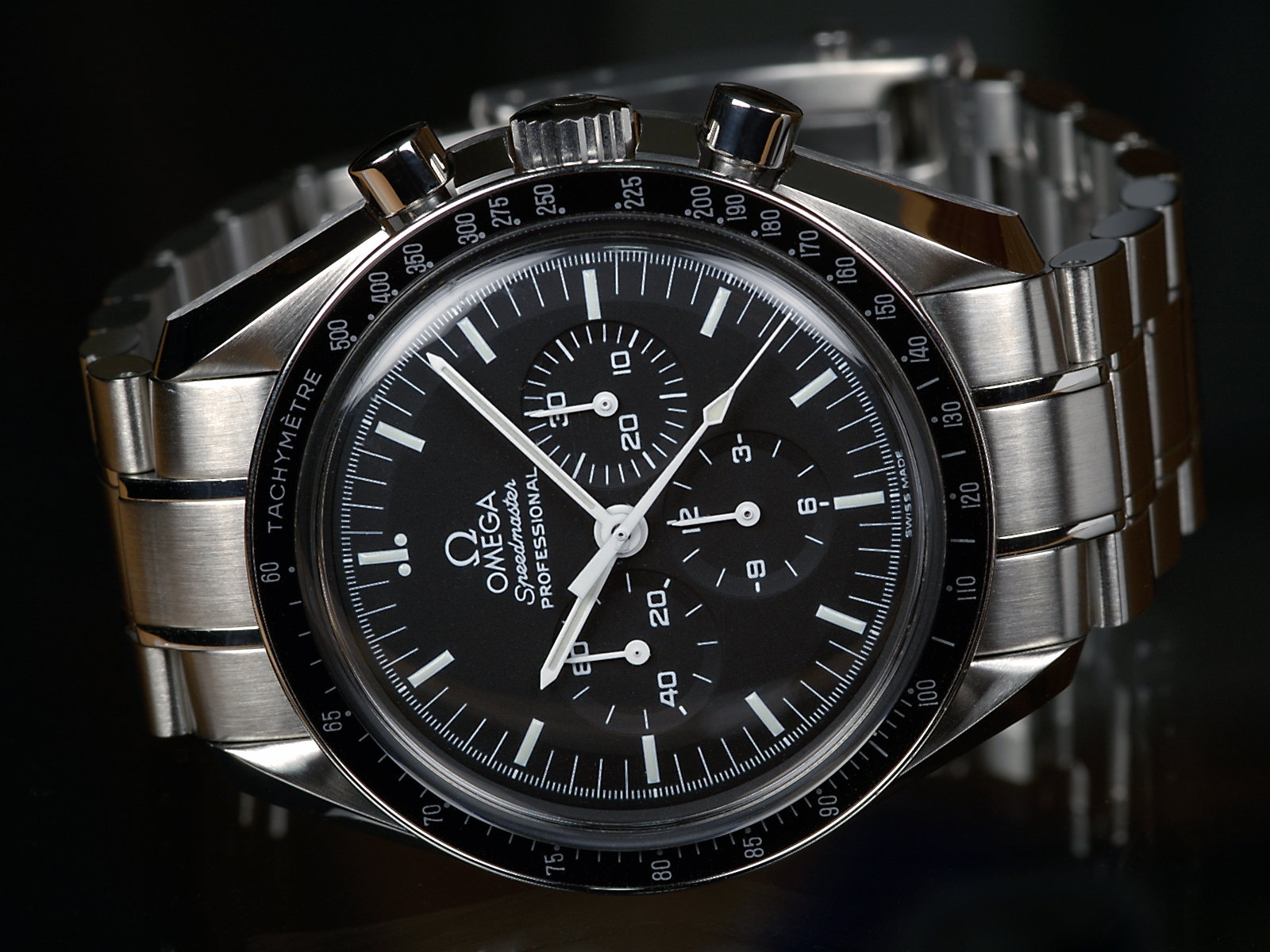
The Omega Speedmaster, or "Moonwatch", selected by NASA for all the Apollo missions

First worn by Mercury astronaut Wally Schirra in 1962, the "Omega Speedmaster Professional Chronograph" was chosen by NASA to become the only chronograph certified for use on all missions since 1965.

The selection of the "Omega Speedmaster Professional Chronograph" for American astronauts was the subject of a rivalry between Omega and Bulova.

All subsequent crewed NASA missions also used this handwound wristwatch. NASA started selecting the chronograph in the early 1960s. Automatic chronograph wristwatches were not available until 1969. Even so, all the instrument panel clocks and time-keeping mechanisms in the spacecraft on those space missions were Bulova Accutrons with tuning fork movements, because at the time NASA did not know how well a mechanical movement would work in zero gravity.

=== Apollo program ===
Buzz Aldrin wearing the Omega Speedmaster (on his right wrist) during the first manned Moon landing of Apollo 11 in 1969

The Omega Speedmaster Professional Chronograph was the first watch on the Moon, worn by Buzz Aldrin. Although Apollo 11 commander Neil Armstrong was first to set foot on the Moon, he left his 105.012 Speedmaster inside the Lunar Module Eagle as a backup because the LM's electronic timer had malfunctioned. Aldrin wore his, making his Speedmaster the first watch worn on the Moon. Armstrong's watch is displayed at the National Air and Space Museum in Washington, D.C. Aldrin's was stolen; he mentions in his 1973 book, Return to Earth, that when donating several items to the Smithsonian Institution his Omega was one of the few things stolen from his personal effects.

In 2007, to mark the 50th anniversary of the Omega Speedmaster Professional Chronograph, Omega unveiled the commemorative Speedmaster Professional Chronograph Moonwatch. The watch had the distinctive features of the first hand-winding Omega Speedmaster introduced in 1957. It was sold in an edition of 1,957 pieces.

=== Deepest normally functioning diving watch ===
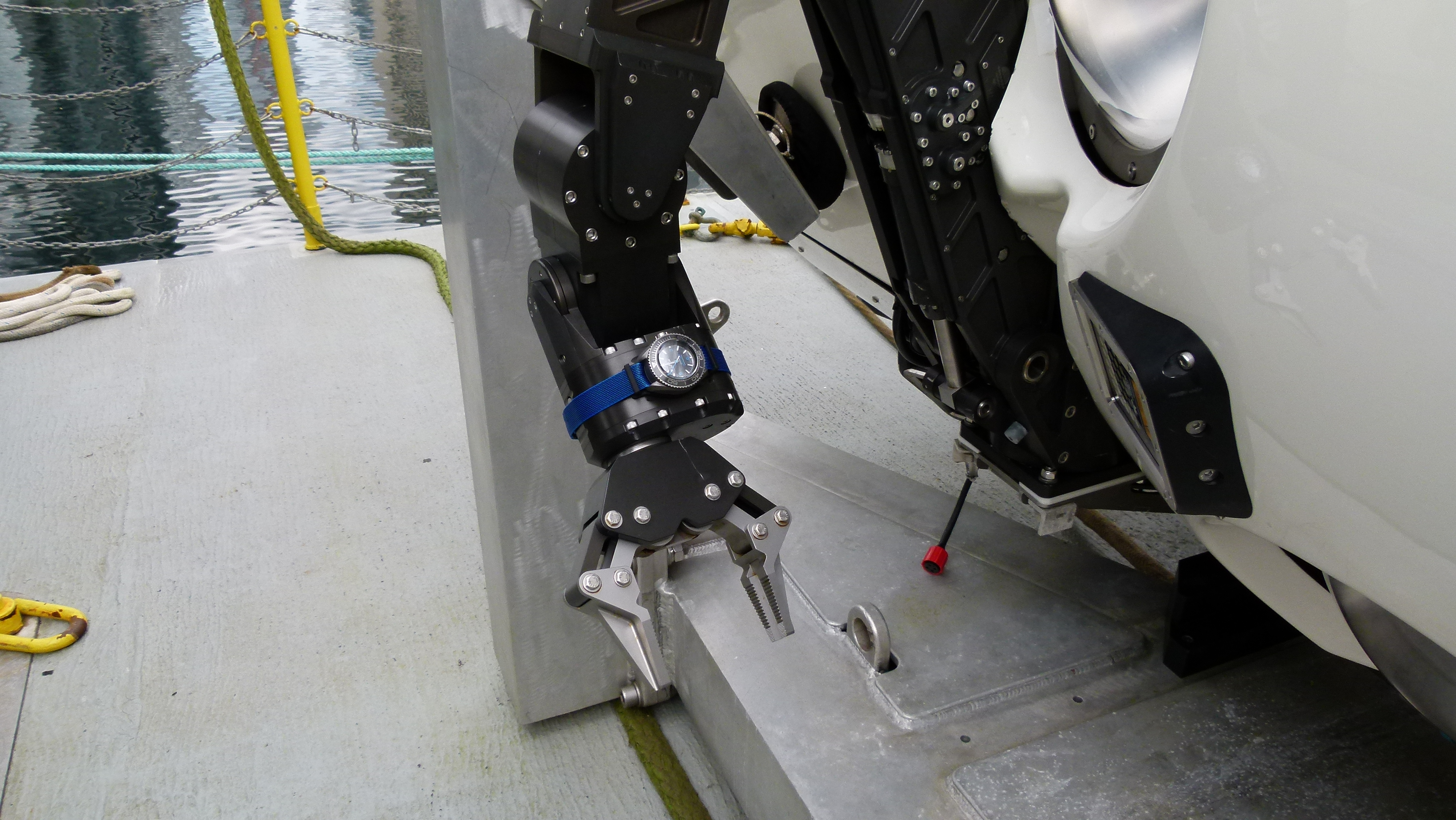
Omega Seamaster Planet Ocean Ultra Deep Professional, strapped on Limiting Factor's manipulator

As of May 2019, the record for the deepest normally functioning experimental diving watch is held by the Omega Seamaster Planet Ocean Ultra Deep Professional after reaching a (revised) depth of 10,925 m (35,843 ft) ±4 m (13 ft) of seawater during a descent to the bottom of the "Eastern Pool" of the Challenger Deep by the Five Deeps Expedition. Two of these watches were attached to the outside of the Deep-Submergence Vehicle Limiting Factor: one on each of the main vessel's robotic arms and an additional one on the ultra-deep-sea lander Skaff. Due to a technical problem the watch fixed to the ultra-deep-sea lander stayed on the bottom for two days before it and the lander were salvaged from an unrevised depth of 10,927 m (35,850 ft). The normal surface air filled watch case is made of (DNV GL certified) forged grade 5 titanium alloy (same as the hull of the DSV Limiting Factor) has a 55 mm (2.17 in) diameter and is almost 28 mm (1.10 in) thick and has been tested and certified for up to 1500 bar/15,000 m (49,213 ft).

=== Artemis program ===
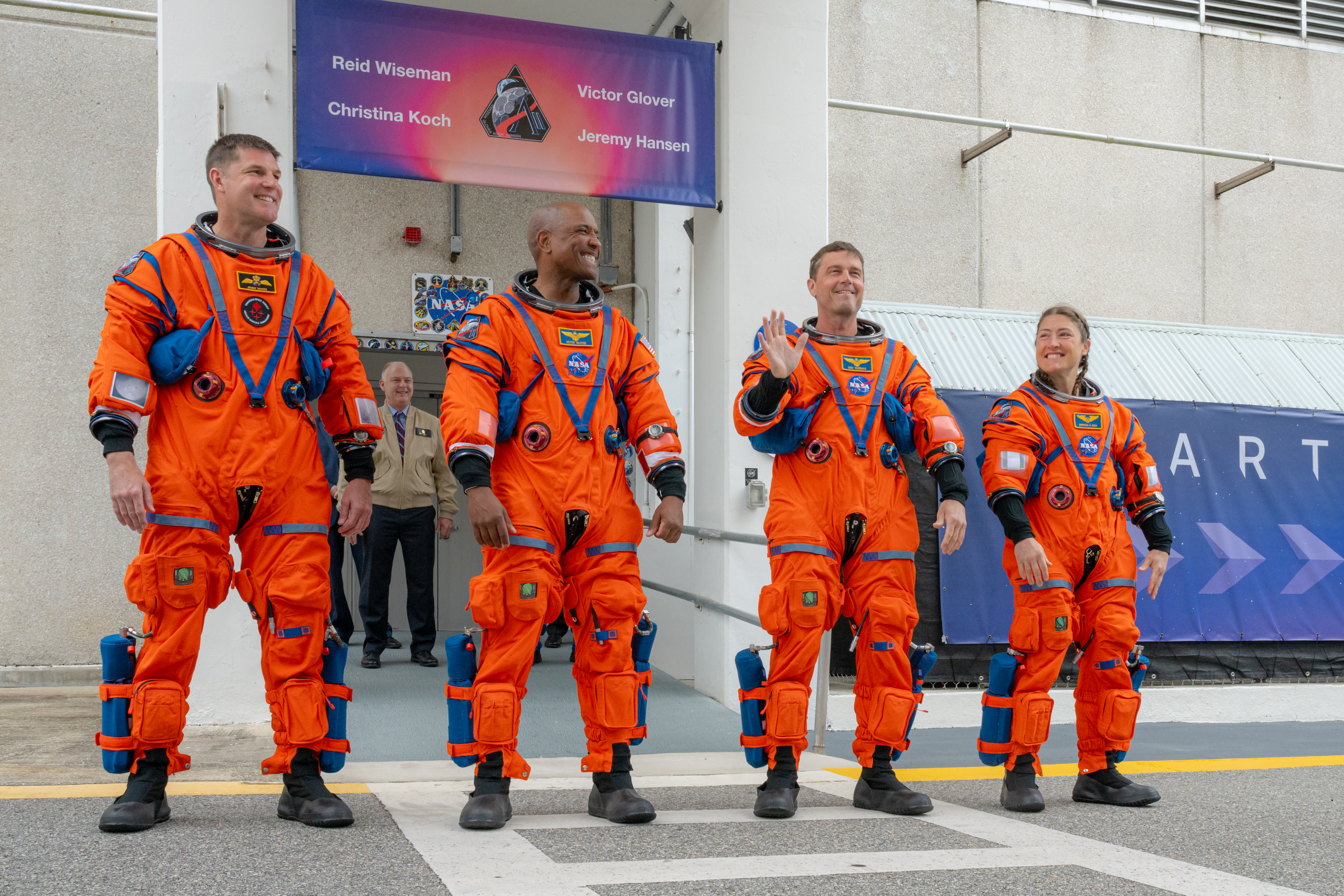
Omega Speedmaster X-33 watches worn by the Artemis II crew over their pressure suit sleeves

For the Artemis II mission, which launched on 1 April 2026, as the first crewed lunar flight since 1972, all four crew members were equipped with the Omega Speedmaster X-33 (Generation 2). While the mechanical "Moonwatch" remains a historic icon, Commander Reid Wiseman, Victor Glover, Christina Koch, and Jeremy Hansen utilized the "ana-digi" X-33 for its modern mission-specific functions, such as digital mission elapsed time and multiple alarms. During the launch and mission preparations, the astronauts were frequently photographed wearing the titanium timepieces strapped over the sleeves of their pressure suits.

== Clientele ==
The brand's celebrity and politician customers include actor George Clooney, actor Daniel Craig, actor Brendan Fraser, former professional tennis player Martina Hingis, actress Nicole Kidman, former professional tennis player Anna Kournikova, actor Cillian Murphy, singer Elvis Presley, actor Ryan Reynolds, Prince William, CCP Chairman Mao Zedong, CCP General Secretary Xi Jinping, U.S. President Joe Biden and John F. Kennedy.

== Sponsorship ==
Mobland

In the 2025 series Mobland, Helen Mirren’s character Maeve Harrigan wears an 18-carat gold Omega Constellation, while her co-star Pierce Brosnan is seen wearing an Omega Constellation Globemaster.

NCIS

In the US television series NCIS, lead actor Mark Harmon wears an Omega Seamaster Planet Ocean with supporting cast member Michael Weatherly wearing a matching version. In both cases, this is the stainless steel model with orange bezel and black dial.

Need for Speed

Omega is the official timekeeper for the video game Need for Speed II, released on Microsoft Windows and PlayStation in 1997.

Kojak

In the US television series Kojak, lead actor Telly Savalas wore a gold-plated Omega Time Computer One, the first mass-produced LED watch.

James Bond

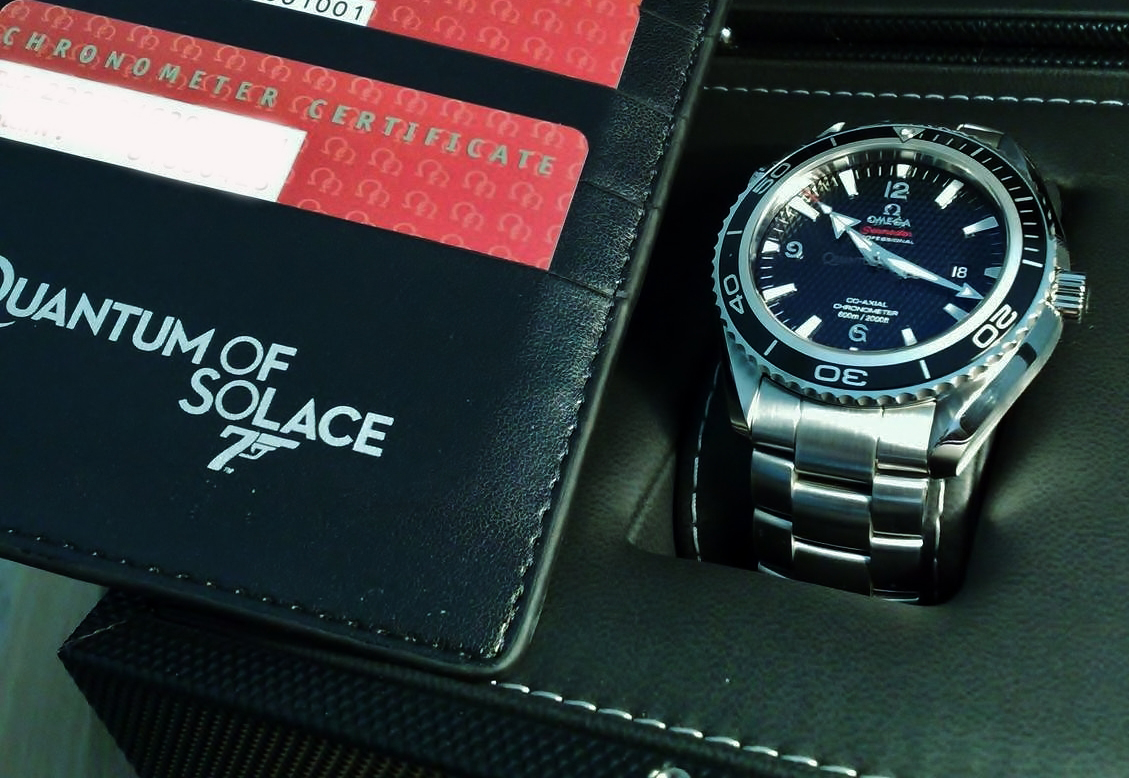
Omega Seamaster Planet Ocean worn by Daniel Craig in the 2008 movie Quantum of Solace

Omega has been associated with James Bond movies since 1995. That year, Pierce Brosnan took over the role of James Bond and began wearing the Omega Seamaster Quartz Professional (model 2541.80.00) in GoldenEye. In all later films, Brosnan wore an Omega Seamaster Professional Chronometer (model 2531.80.00). Although the character had worn Rolexes in previous films and the initial book series, Goldeneye's costume designer Lindy Hemming selected the Seamaster model as she wanted James Bond to appear more 'modern and European'. Omega was eager to participate in the high-profile product placement opportunity to further its brand image and supplied the watches.

For the 40th anniversary of James Bond (2002) a commemorative edition of the watch was made available model 2537.80.00 (10,007 units). The watch is identical to the model 2531.80.00 except the blue watch dial had a 007 logo inscribed across it, machined into the case-back, and inscribed on the clasp.

Daniel Craig, then-current James Bond since Casino Royale, also wears an Omega Seamaster: the Seamaster Planet Ocean (model 2900.50.91) in the first part of Casino Royale, and the Seamaster Professional 300M (model 2220.80.00) in the latter part (from travelling to Montenegro). He mentions Omega by name when questioned by Vesper Lynd (portrayed by Eva Green). With the launch of the film in 2006, Omega released a 007-special of the Professional 300M, (model 2226.80.00) featuring the 007-gun logo on the second hand and the rifle pattern on the watch face, based on the gun barrel sequence of Bond movies.

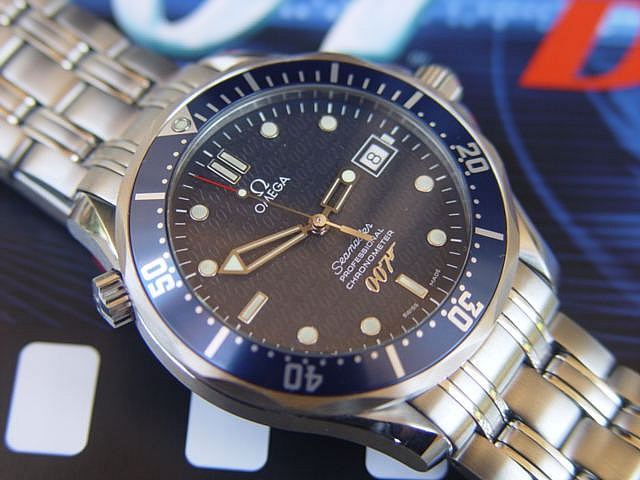
The Omega Seamaster, a deep diving watch. The second crown (at 10 o'clock) is a helium release valve to allow helium out of the watch after practicing saturation diving at great depths. The watch is similar to that shown in recent James Bond films, in which this valve is transformed into improbable hidden gadgets.

Omega released a second James Bond limited edition watch in 2006, a Seamaster Planet Ocean model with a limited production of 5007 units. The model is similar to what Craig wears earlier on in the film; however, it has a small orange colored 007 logo on the second hand, an engraved caseback signifying the Bond connection, and an engraved 007 on the clasp.

In the 2008 film Quantum of Solace, Craig wears the Omega Seamaster Planet Ocean with a black face and steel bracelet (42 mm version). Another limited edition was released featuring the checkered "PPK grip" face with the Quantum of Solace logo. The third limited edition release from Omega came in 2012, based on the Planet Ocean Ref: 232.30.42.21.01.004. It featured a textured dial with the 007 logo at the 7 o'clock position and a 007 decorated rotor visible through the case-back.

In 2015, two commemorative models were produced for the 24th Bond film, Spectre: the Omega Seamaster 300 m master co-axial Ref: 233.32.41.21.01.001. 7007 units were produced and came with a NATO strap, as well as the standard bracelet. The watch featured a bi-directional bezel with a world timing scale, rather than the diving scale present on the standard 300m. The second timepiece, the Omega Seamaster Aqua Terra 150m master co-axial Ref: 231.10.42.21.03.004, was decorated with a textured dial based on the Bond family coat of arms and a rotor resembling a bullet and gun barrel with "James Bond" inscribed.

For Craig's final film as James Bond, No Time to Die (2021), Omega once again made a special edition of Omega Seamaster for the film, which was based on the Seamaster 300 previously worn by Brosnan, but with a case made from Grade 2 titanium, rather than the usual stainless steel from the basic models. The color chosen was brown, and also features the “broad arrow” British military logo on the dial and the caseback.

The upcoming video game title 007: First Light is set to feature an unreleased Seamaster Diver 300M Chronograph.

Sports sponsorship

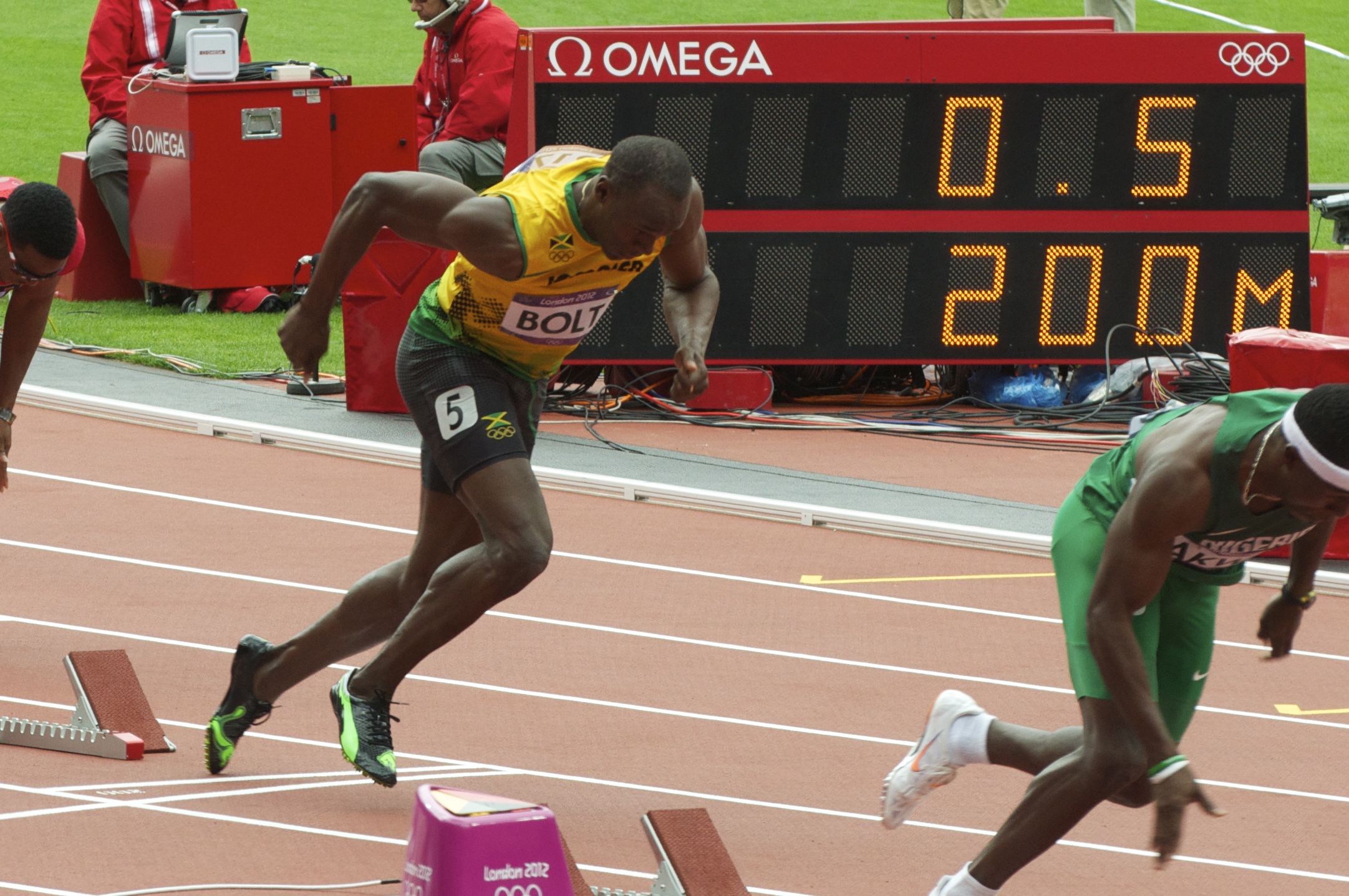
Omega scoreboards during the 2012 Olympic Games

Omega has frequently been the official timekeeper for the Olympics, beginning with the 1932 Summer Olympics. It was the official timekeeper for the 2006 Winter Olympics, 2008 Summer Olympics, 2010 Winter Olympics, and 2012 Summer Olympics. In 2008, Omega released an Olympic edition watch with the Olympics logo on the second hand. Olympic swimmer and multiple gold medalist Michael Phelps is an Omega Ambassador and wears the Omega Seamaster Planet Ocean. In 2014, Omega became the official timekeeper of the 2014 Sochi Winter Olympics. The brand was a Worldwide Olympic Partner at the 2016 Summer Olympics. After the 2020 Summer Olympics were postponed due to COVID-19, the Tokyo Station's Olympic countdown clock, made by Omega, which was displaying the number of days until the Games, and a local tourist attraction, was halted and switched to show the current date and time. This partnership will continue at least until 2032.

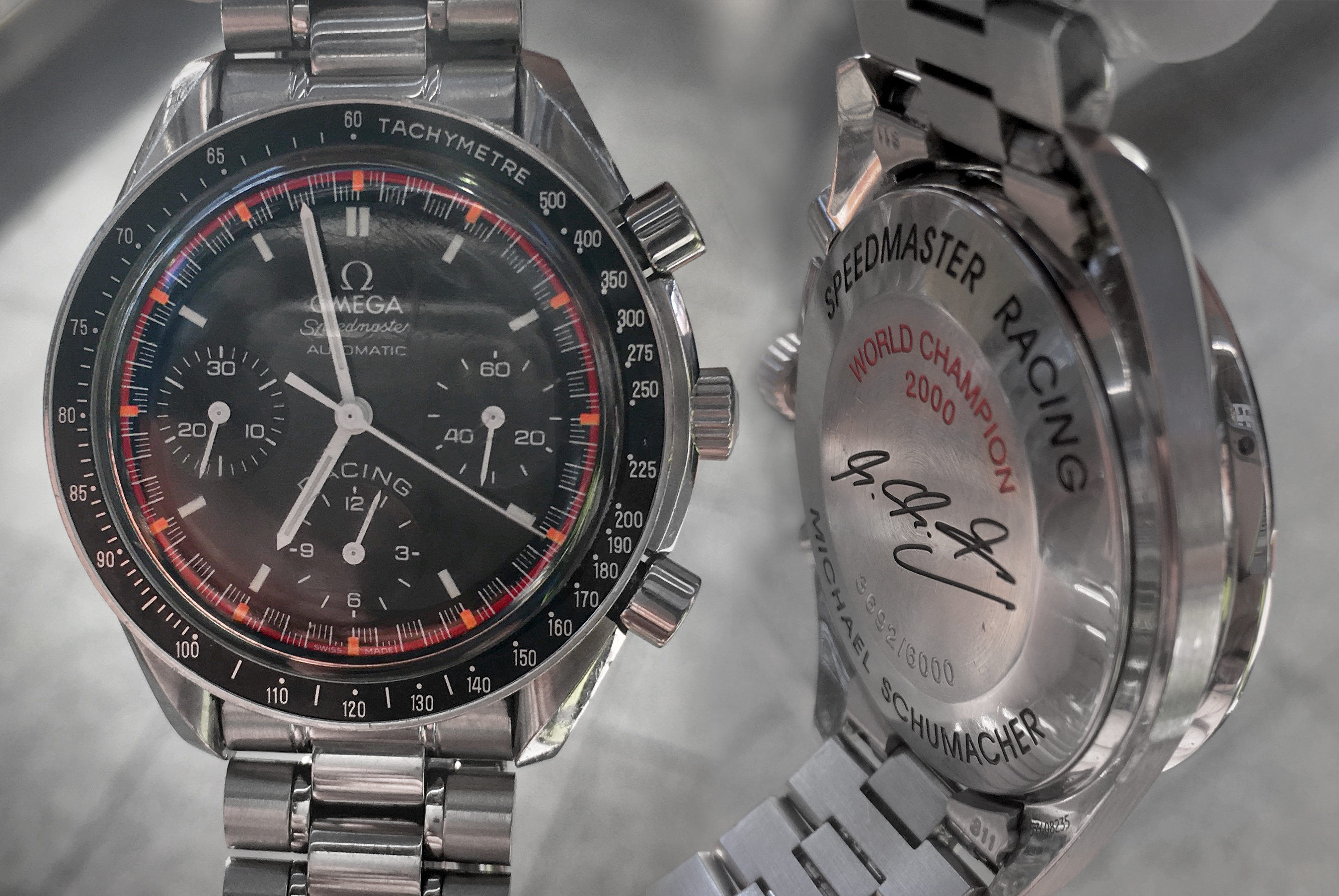
Speedmaster Racing, Michael Schumacher Edition of 2000, with his signature engraving on the backside

Omega constructed and maintained a monochrome video scoreboard for Milwaukee's County Stadium, the former home of Major League Baseball's Milwaukee Brewers, which was in use from the board's construction in 1980 until the stadium's closure in 2000.

Providing support to Emirates Team New Zealand and representing the team's official watch, in 2007 Omega introduced the Seamaster NZL-32 chronograph, named after the boat that won America's Cup in 1995. The watch was developed in cooperation with Dean Barker, skipper of Team New Zealand and Omega Ambassador.

On 1 July 2011, Omega became the official timekeeper of PGA of America and signed a five-year agreement. The brand also sponsors the Dubai Desert Classic and the Omega European Masters.

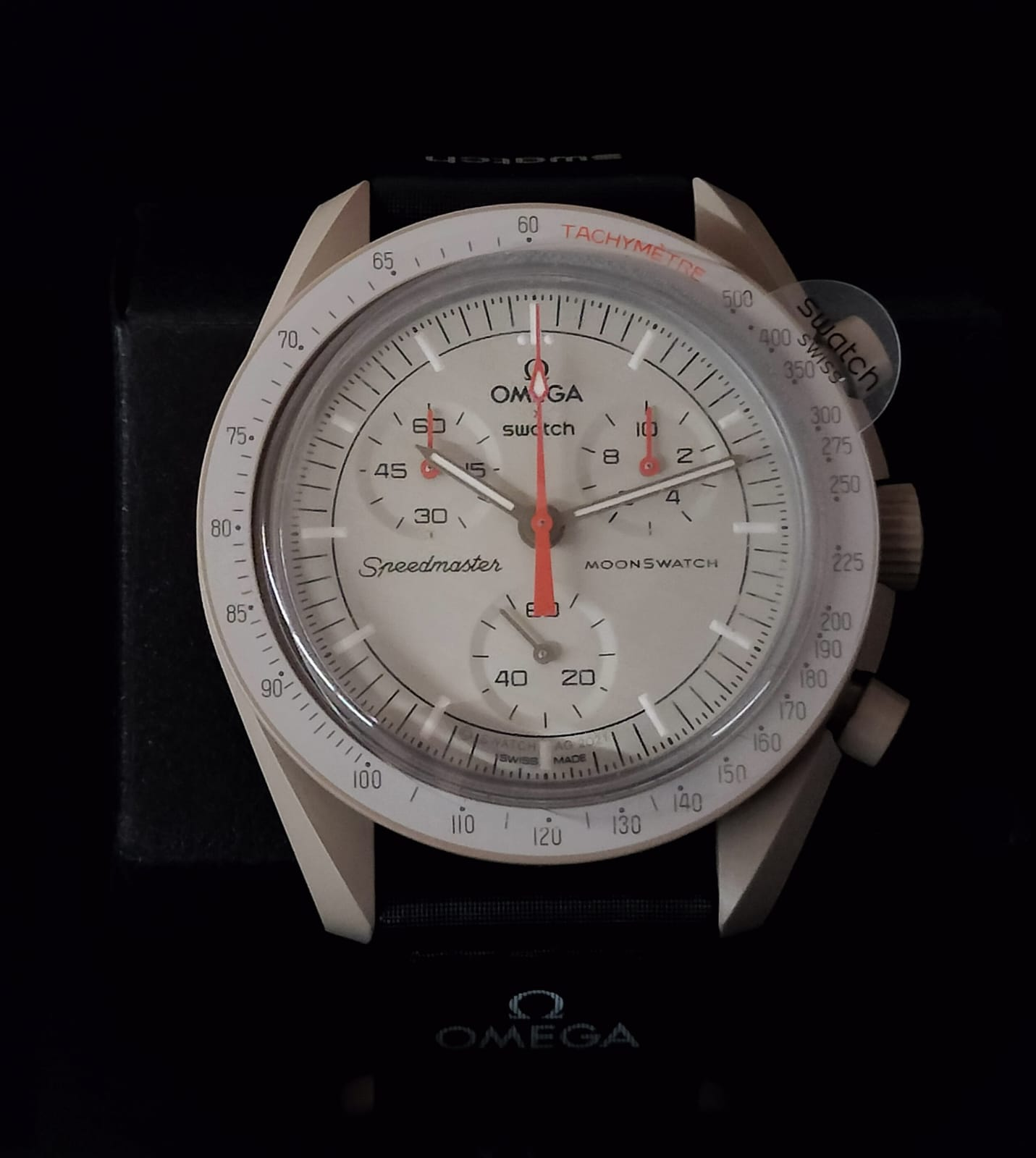
Omega x Swatch "MoonSwatch" Mission to Jupiter

== Controversy ==
In December 2018, World Wide Fund for Nature (WWF) released a report assigning environmental ratings to 15 major watch manufacturers and jewelers in Switzerland, and Omega was given the lowest environmental rating, "Latecomers/Non-transparent", suggesting the manufacturer has taken few actions addressing the impact of its manufacturing activities on the environment and climate change.

Omega supports ocean-protection projects through a partnership with the environmental awareness organisation the GoodPlanet Foundation. The collaboration has included initiatives in Indonesia focused on coastal conservation, restoration of mangrove forests and seagrass beds, and preservation of local economic activity. The Times reported that Omega has also established “Planet Omega” to advocate for groups engaged in marine and ecological preservation.

Omega faced activist pressure to withdraw from being the official timekeepers of the 2022 Beijing Winter Olympics after some governments enacted diplomatic boycotts over human rights violations (in particular China's repression of Uyghurs and other minorities, which some countries have designated as a genocide). Omega defended its continued role as official time keeper of the Olympics by stating its policy "not to get involved in certain political issues because it would not advance the cause of sport in which our commitment lies."

== See also ==
- Ernst Thomke
- Nicolas G. Hayek
- Coaxial escapement
- List of watch manufacturers
