= Swatch =

Swiss watchmaker

Swatch Ltd.

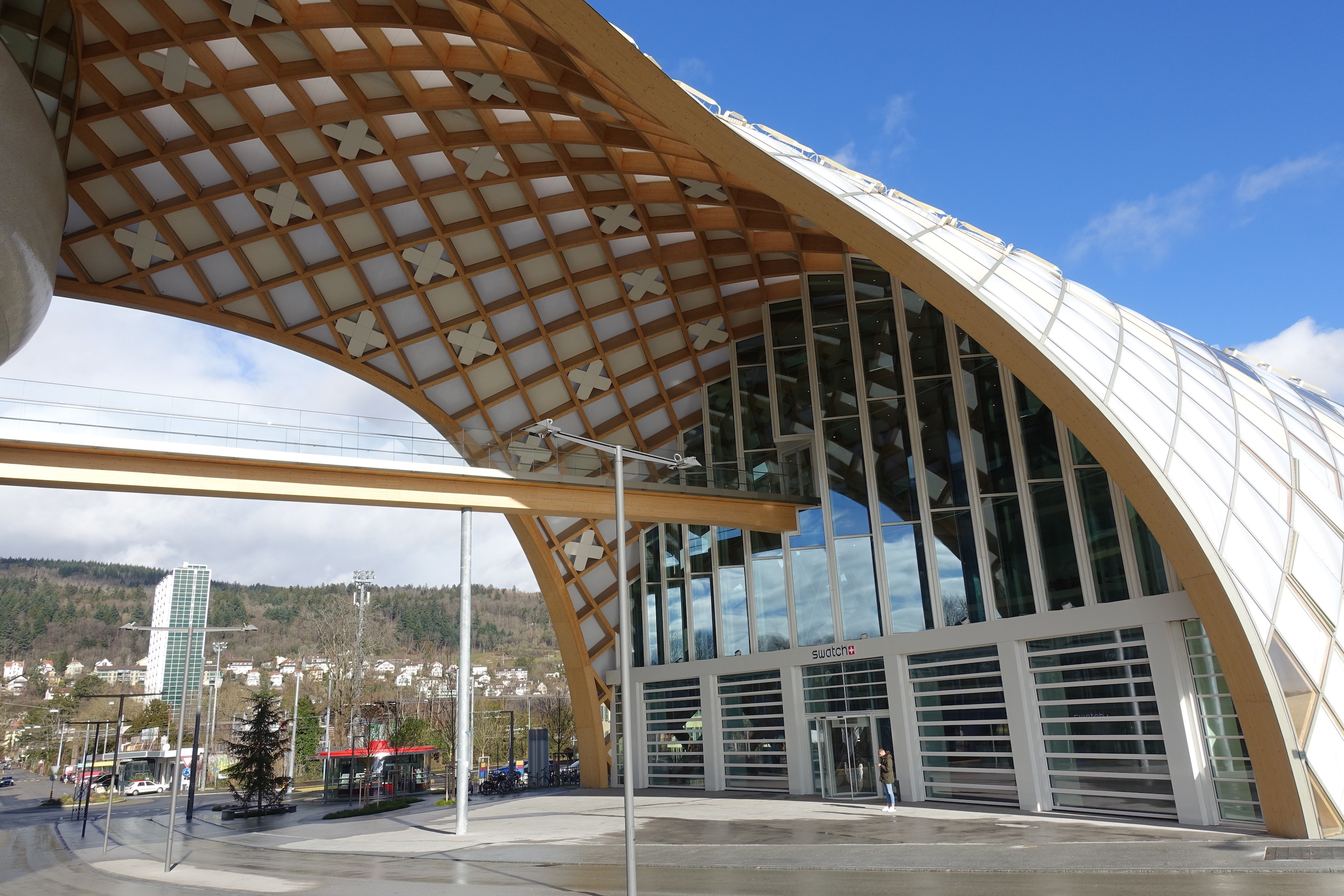
- Swatch's headquarters in Biel/Bienne, Switzerland
- Type: Subsidiary
- Industry: Watchmaking
- Founded: 1983; 43 years ago
- Headquarters: Biel/Bienne, Switzerland
- Key people: Nick Hayek Jr. (chairman, president)
- Products: Wristwatches
- Parent: The Swatch Group
- Subsidiaries: Flik Flak
- Website: swatch.com

Swatch is a Swiss watch company founded in 1983 by Ernst Thomke, Elmar Mock, and Jacques Müller. It is a subsidiary of the Swatch Group. The Swatch product line was developed as a response to the "quartz crisis" of the 1970s and 1980s, in which inexpensive, battery-powered, quartz-regulated watches were competing against more established European watchmakers focused on artisanal craftsmanship producing mostly mechanical watches.

The name Swatch is a contraction of "second watch", its concept of "low-cost, high-tech, artistic and emotional" watches marketed as casual, disposable accessories.

== History ==
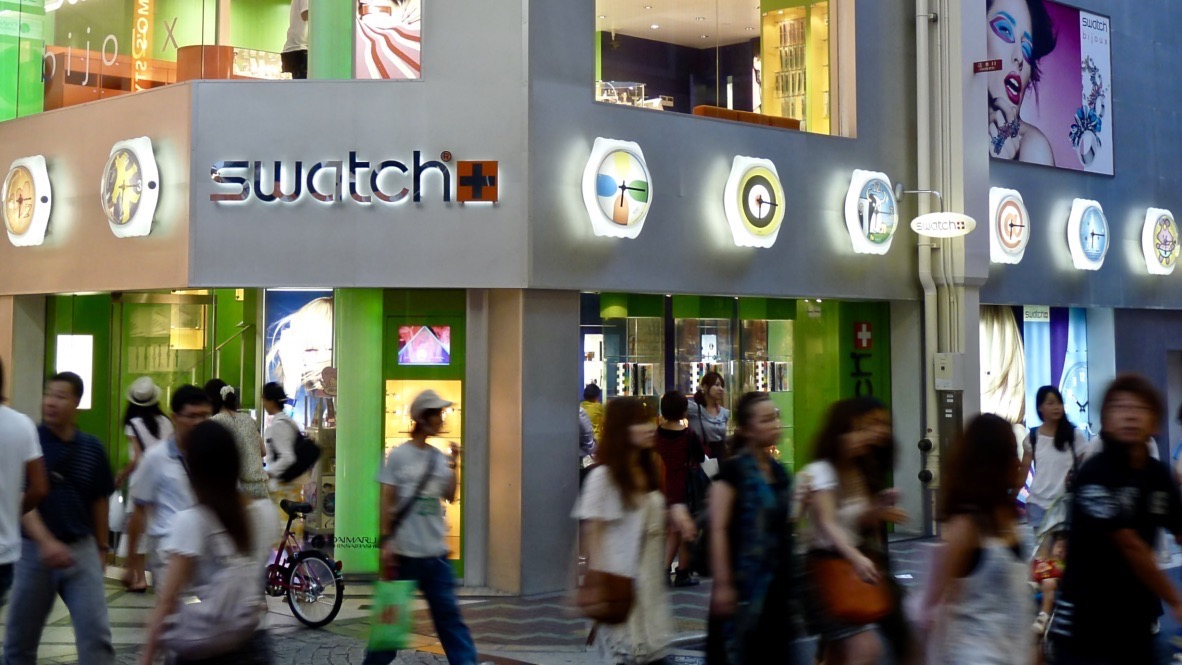
Swatch store in Osaka, Japan

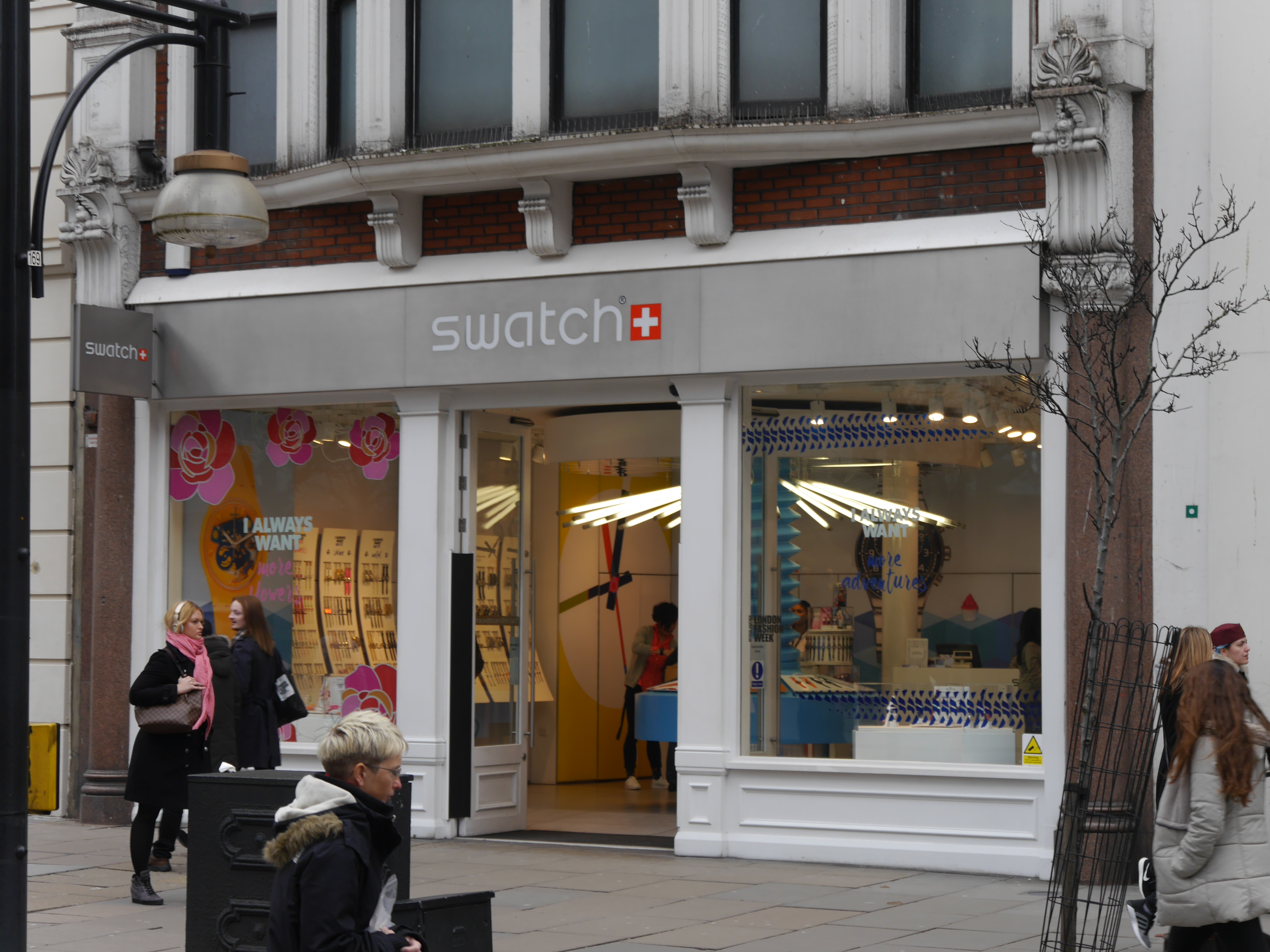
Swatch store, Oxford Street, London, 2016

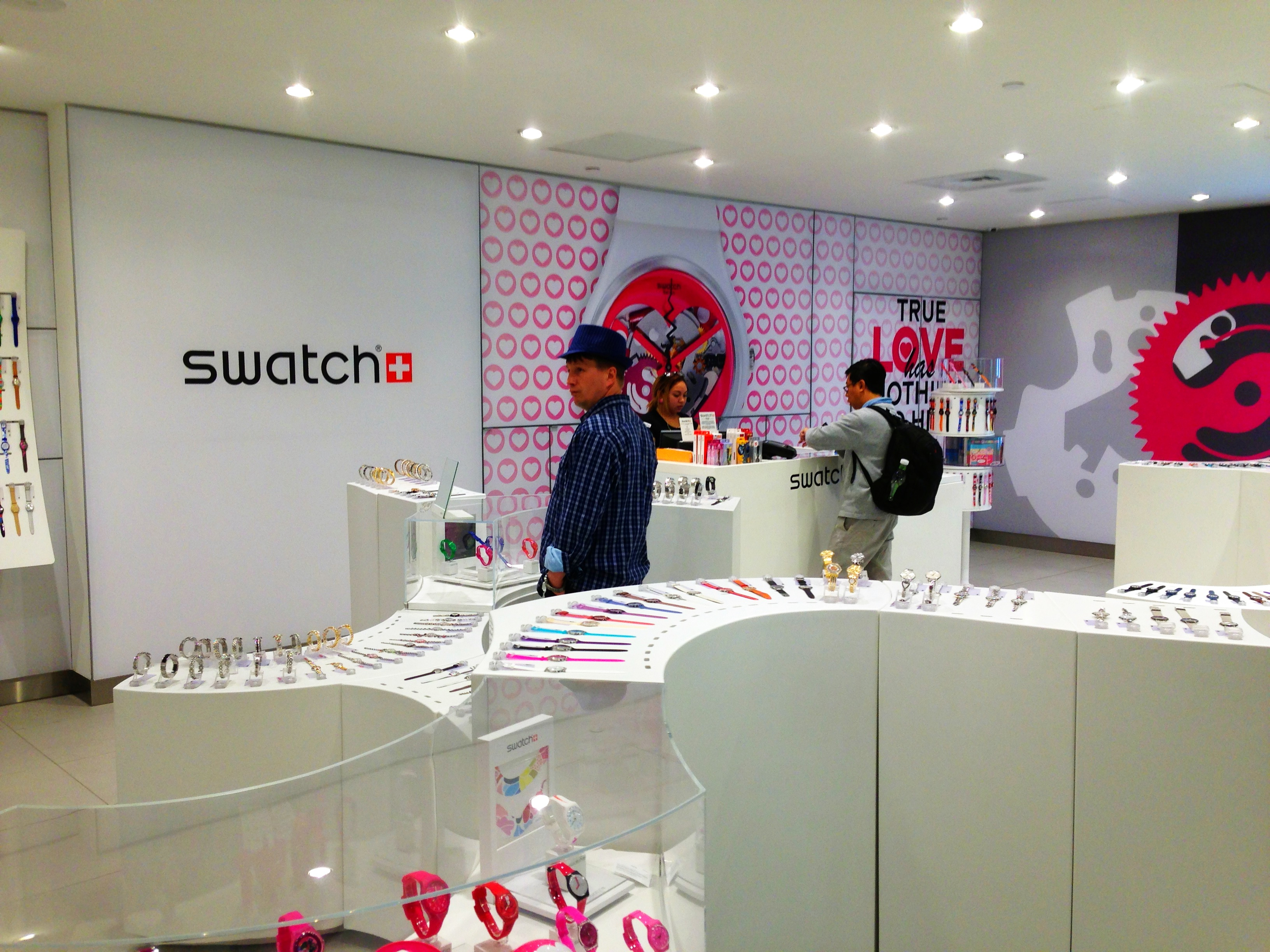
Swatch store interior

Swatch began development in the early 1980s under the leadership of the then ETA SA's CEO Ernst Thomke with a small team of watch engineers led by Elmar Mock and Jacques Müller.

Conceived as a standard timekeeper in plastic, Franz Sprecher, a marketing consultant hired by Thomke to give the project an outsider's consideration, sought to create a fashionable line of watches.

Swatch was originally intended to re-capture entry level market share lost by Swiss manufacturers of mechanical watches and the subsequent growth of Japanese companies such as Seiko and Citizen in the 1960s and 1970s. It was also meant to re-popularize analog watches at a time when digital watches had achieved wide popularity.

In 1983, the group hired Jacques Irniger—who formerly served as the marketing executive for Colgate and Nestlé—to launch the swatch.

The first collection of twelve Swatch models was introduced on 1 March 1983 in Zürich, Switzerland. Initially the price ranged from CHF 39.90 to CHF 49.90 but was standardized to CHF 50.00 in the autumn of the same year. Sales targets were set at one million timepieces for 1983 and 2.5 million for the year after. With an aggressive marketing campaign and relatively low price for a Swiss-made watch, it gained instant popularity in its home market.

Lebanese entrepreneur Nicolas G. Hayek, together with a group of Swiss investors, took over a majority shareholding of Swatch during 1985 in the newly consolidated group under the name Societe Suisse de Microelectronique et d'Horlogerie, or SMH. He became chairman of the board of directors and CEO in 1986. Later he changed the company's name to Swatch Group.

This combination of marketing and manufacturing expertise restored Switzerland as a major player in the world wristwatch market. Synthetic materials were used for the watch cases as well as a new ultra-sonic welding process and assembly technology. In 1997, the Swatch Group opened about 60 stores worldwide.

=== Product lines ===
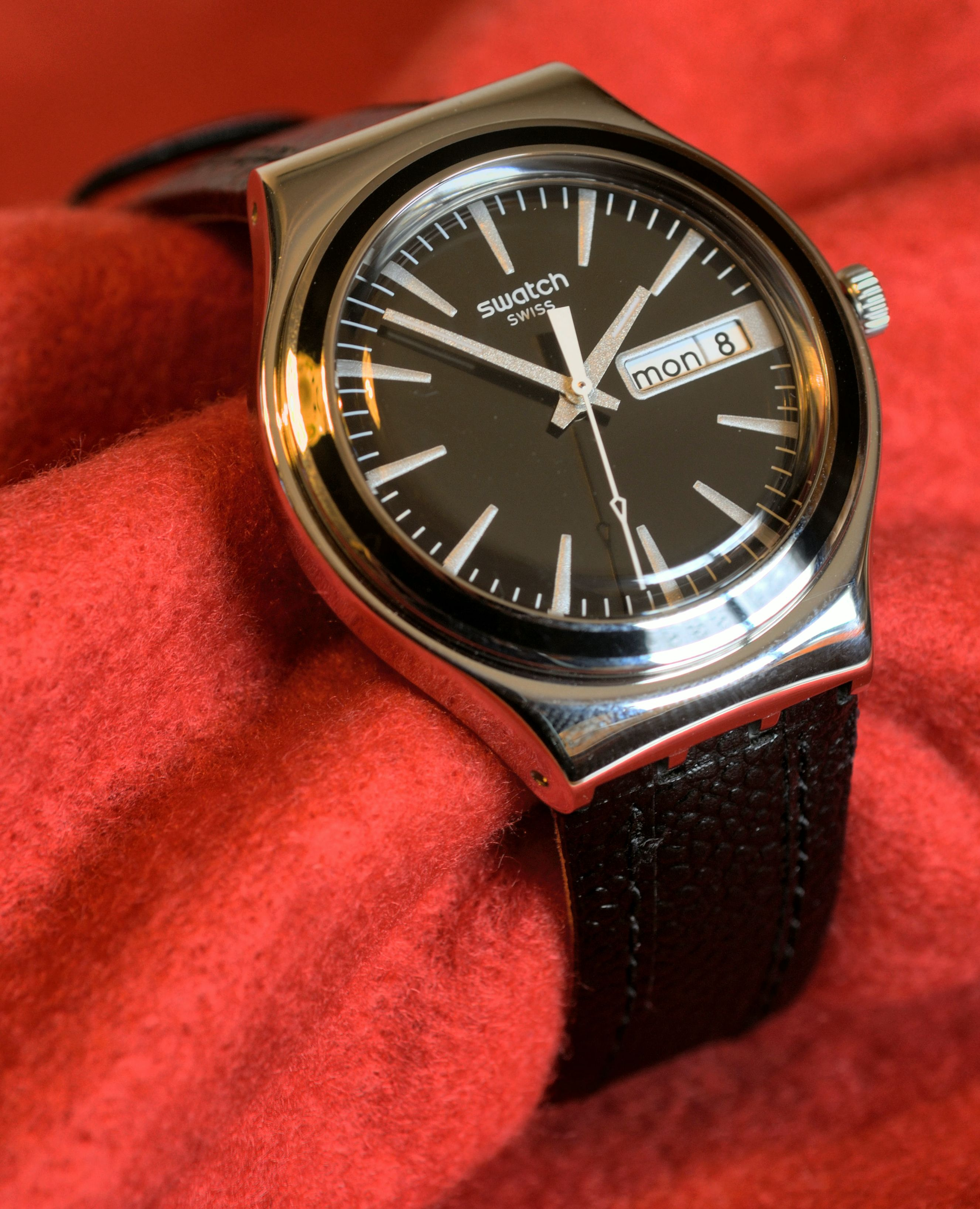
Swatch Irony "Charcoal Suit"

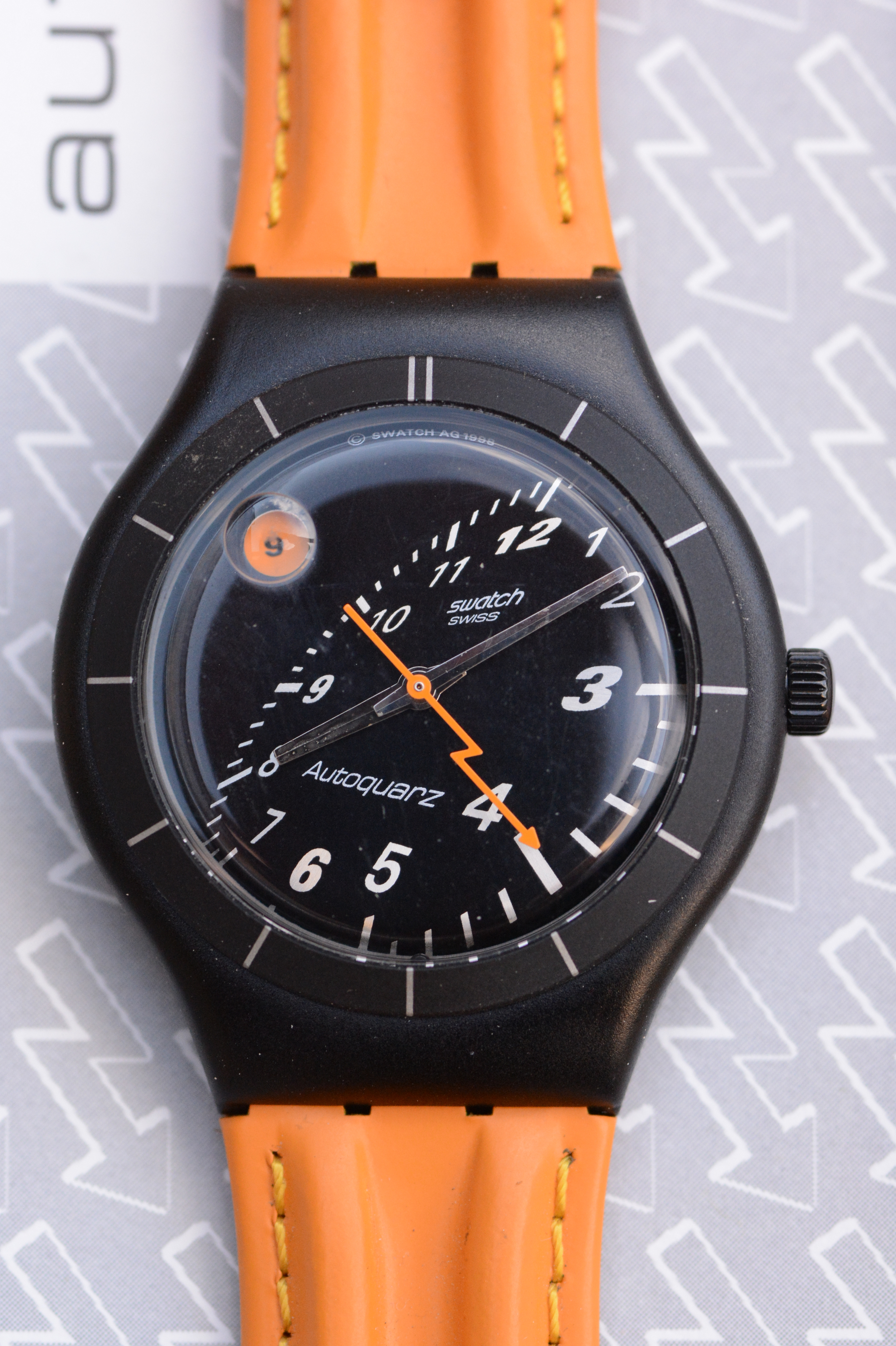
Swatch watch with Autoquartz movement, 1998

There are families under the Swatch brand:

==== Swatch Originals ====
The Originals are plastic-cased watches. They are available in various sizes, shapes, and designs. The Originals consist of various sub-families as well.

==== Swatch Irony ====
The Irony family contains all the metal-cased watches produced by Swatch. These include both quartz-driven and automatic mechanical watches that can be serviced. The automatics have a 21J/23J ETA 2842 movement. This movement is exclusive to Swatch and is derived from 2824 to 2822.

Irony Chronograph was introduced in 1996 (type/code: YCS101).

==== Swatch Skin ====
The Skin family contains two sub families: Original Skin and Skin Chronograph. The Original Skin was introduced on 6 October 1997 as a thinner version of the original Swatch watch. It is ultra thin, standing at 3.9 mm (1/8 in), hence the name Swatch Skin. The Swatch Skin later went on to enter the Guinness Book of World Records as the world's thinnest plastic watch. The Swatch Chronograph is simply the Swatch Skin with a chronograph function, adding two additional buttons on the side of the watch.

==== Bijoux ====
The Bijoux line is a jewelry line Swatch released in the new millennium; it partnered with Swarovski to encrust the Bijoux line of watches.

==== Digital Touch ====
The Digital Touch line, launched in 2011, derives its name from the touchscreen technology used. In contrast to other Swatch families, a digital LCD shows the time. Various models in different colors of the display are available, which include backlighting for reading in the dark.

==== Bellamy and Pay ====
These Swatch models of wristwatches with a quartz movement are additionally equipped with a near-field communication (NFC) chip to accommodate contactless payment. As an improved second generation, Swatch introduced the model Pay for the Chinese market in July 2017. Unlike the Bellamy, Pay can be programmed and activated in Swatch shops using a Cloud Computing service operated by several Chinese banks.

==== Sistem51 ====
Swatch introduced Sistem51 at Baselworld 2013 as "the world's first mechanical movement with entirely automated assembly." The movement uses 51 components anchored to a central screw with automatic winding and a 90-hour power reserve – and is 100% Swiss made on a 20-metre-long (65 ft) automated assembly line in clean-room conditions, without human intervention.

The movement is permanently sealed in its case with structural adhesive securing both the acrylic crystal over the dial and the case back, making it invulnerable to environmental conditions including moisture, dust or foreign objects – and also making it maintenance free – i.e., impossible to service.

The movement is made from ARCAP, an anti-magnetic alloy of copper, nickel, and zinc – designed to free the movement from the need for adjustment. The escapement has no manual adjustment or regulator; the initial rate is factory laser-set. Swatch reports precision of ±10 seconds per day. The design's peripheral bi-directional rotor allows viewing of movement components through the caseback.

==== Swatch x You ====
In 2017, Swatch introduced Swatch x You, a product that allows one to design their own Swatch by selecting the category and design one wishes to use. An outline of a watch is superimposed over the user's image to assist with designing.

==== Bioreloaded ====
The Bioreloaded line was introduced by Swatch in 2020, consisting of a relaunch of Swatch's 1983 debut collection, but partially made from "bio-sourced" materials. The case, strap, and strap clasp of a Bioreloaded watch are made of a material derived from the seeds of the castor plant, while the packaging material is a biodegradable "paperfoam" created with tapioca and potato starch.

==== Swatch x Omega ====
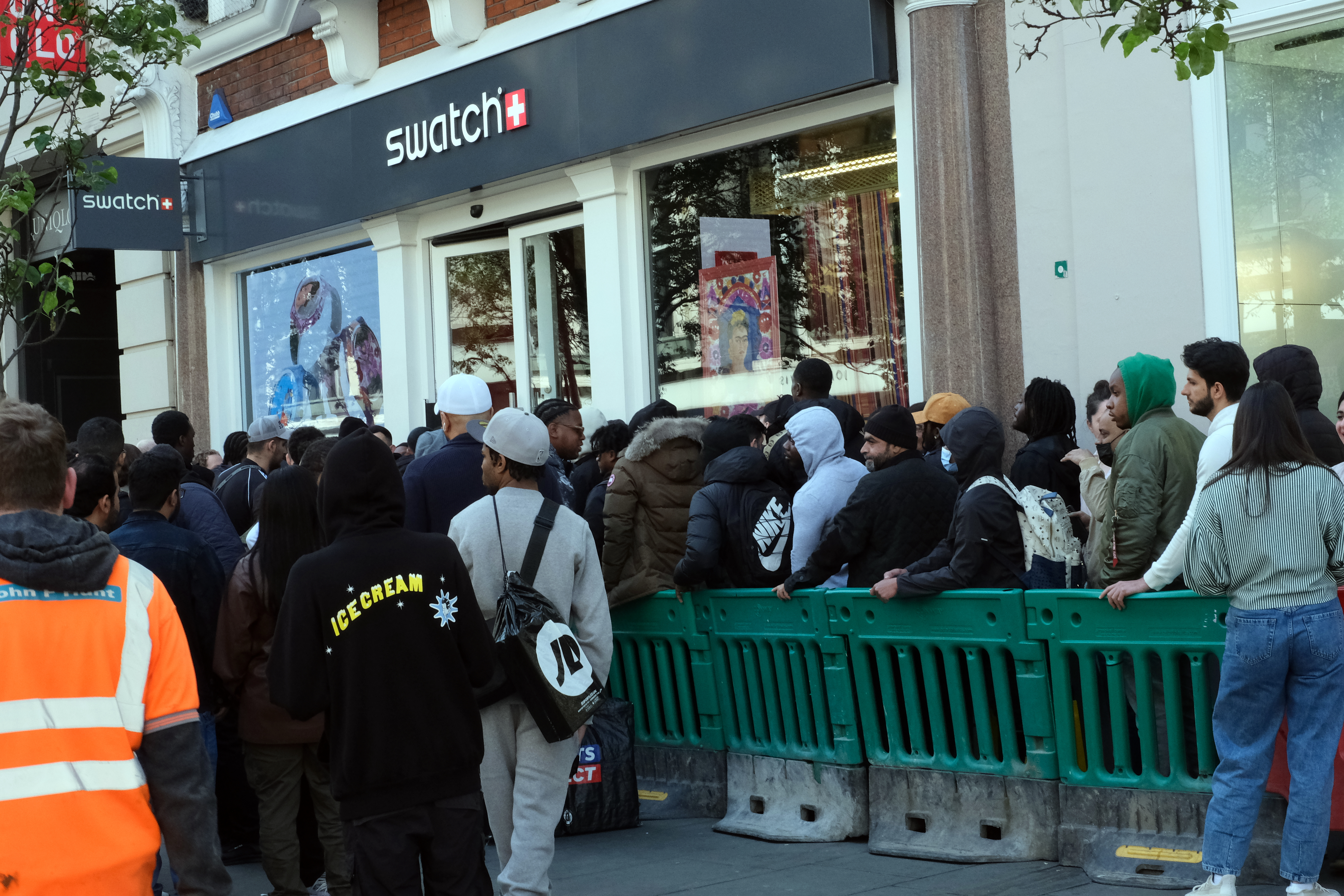
Queue outside a Swatch store in anticipation of a MoonSwatch, May 2022

The Swatch x Omega collaboration debuted in 2022, with MoonSwatch, a collection of reimagined Omega Speedmaster Professional Moonwatches in eleven different color variants themed after the Sun, Moon, and planets of the Solar System. The collection uses the 4 jewel chronograph quartz movement used in other Swatch chronographs and Swatch's BIOCERAMIC composite material.

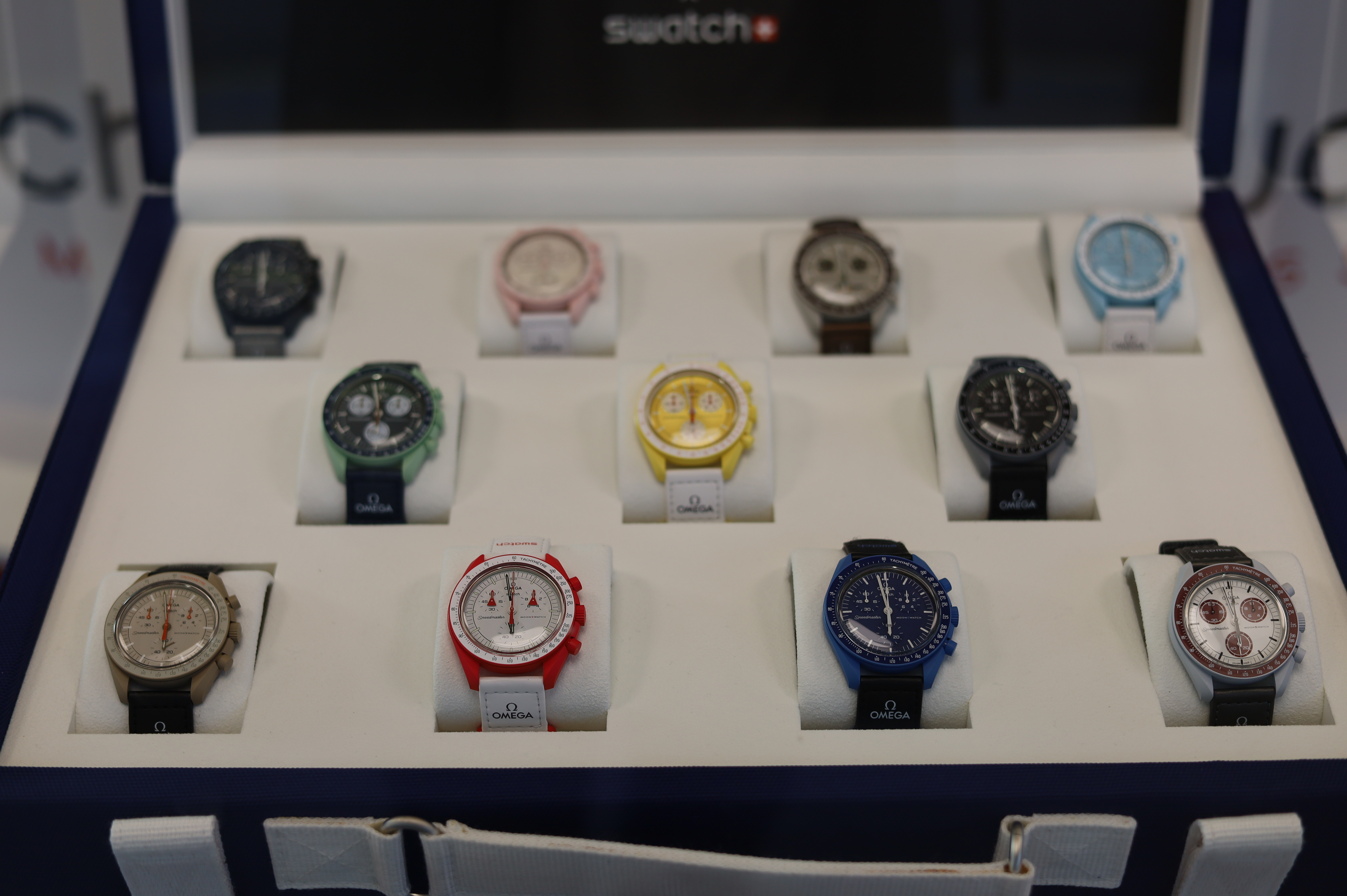
Eleven moonswatch in a showcase

The MoonSwatch collection was released on 26 March 2022, at select Swatch stores. The New York Times called the release "the watch industry's defining moment of 2022". The collection sold out internationally on its release date, with lines formed at most Swatch boutiques where it was carried. Swatch initially stated each consumer could purchase up to two watches but later limited each consumer to one watch. While Swatch initially added the product to their online catalog, it later announced the collection would not be available for sale online. The MoonSwatch is neither a limited nor numbered collection.

==== Pride collection ====
In May 2023, Swatch released a Pride collection of rainbow watches to support the LGBTQ+ cause worldwide. The collection has six watches with different monochrome colours that correspond to the colours of the gay pride flag. In Malaysia, the Home Ministry banned the sale of the watch and raided 13 Swatch outlets to seize and impound 172 watches over three days in May. The company reported that Malaysia was the only country which seized the watches. Swatch filed a lawsuit against the Home Ministry and the Malaysian government, challenging the legality of the seizure in July 2023. The ban was gazetted only in August 2023. In a September 2023 interview, Malaysian Prime Minister Anwar Ibrahim said that the raid was 'excessive', but defended Malaysia's current stance on the LGBT issue. In November 2024, the Malaysian High Court ruled that the raid was conducted without a warrant therefore was deemed illegal. The judge, Justice Amarjeet Singh Serjit Singh, also noted that the ban was imposed only after the watches were seized, which meant that no laws were violated in May 2023. The court ordered the return of the seized watches to the company.

== See also ==
- Swatch Group
- Swatch Internet Time
- Chiara Luzzana

== Bibliography ==
- Mudambi, Ram, "Branding Time: Swatch and Global Brand Management". Temple University, Fox School of Business, Temple University IGMS Case Series No. 05-001, January 2005
