= 24-hour analog dial =

Clock or watch face showing the full 24 hours

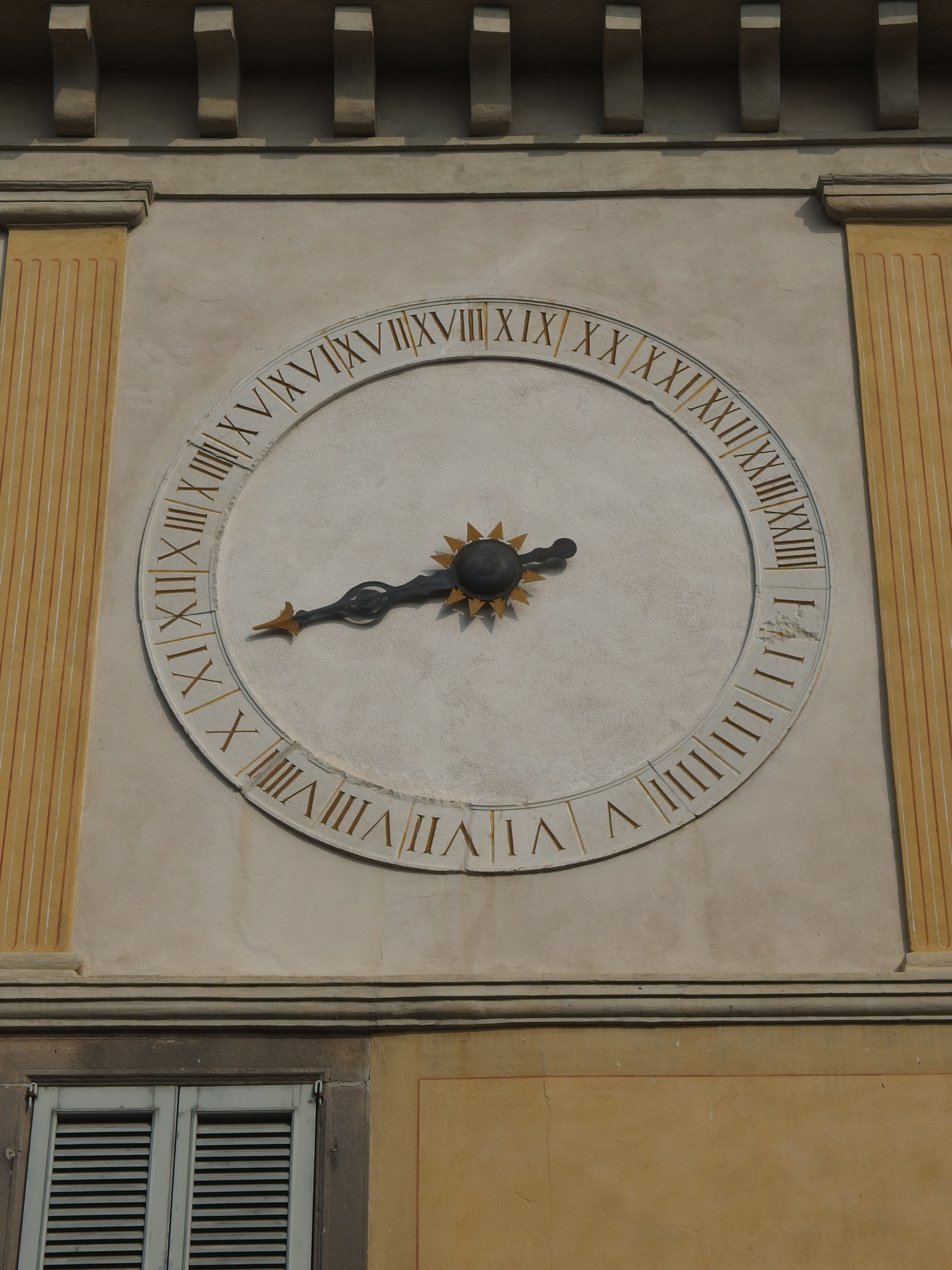
Tower clock in Martinengo, province of Bergamo, Lombardy. The 24th hour on the right side of the dial is typical for the old Italian time system of 24 hours counted from dusk.

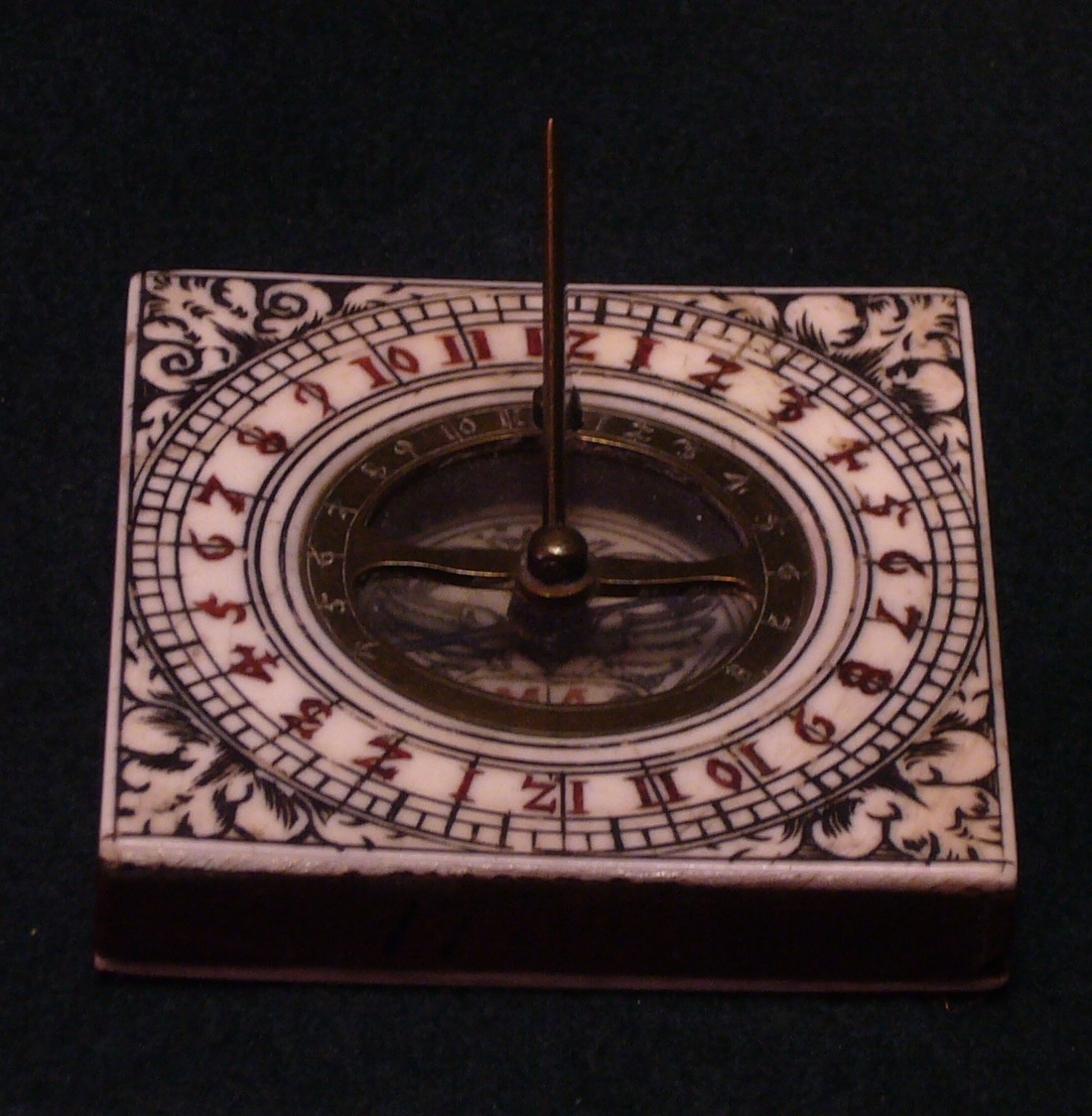
A sundial showing all 24 hours; impractical but symmetrical

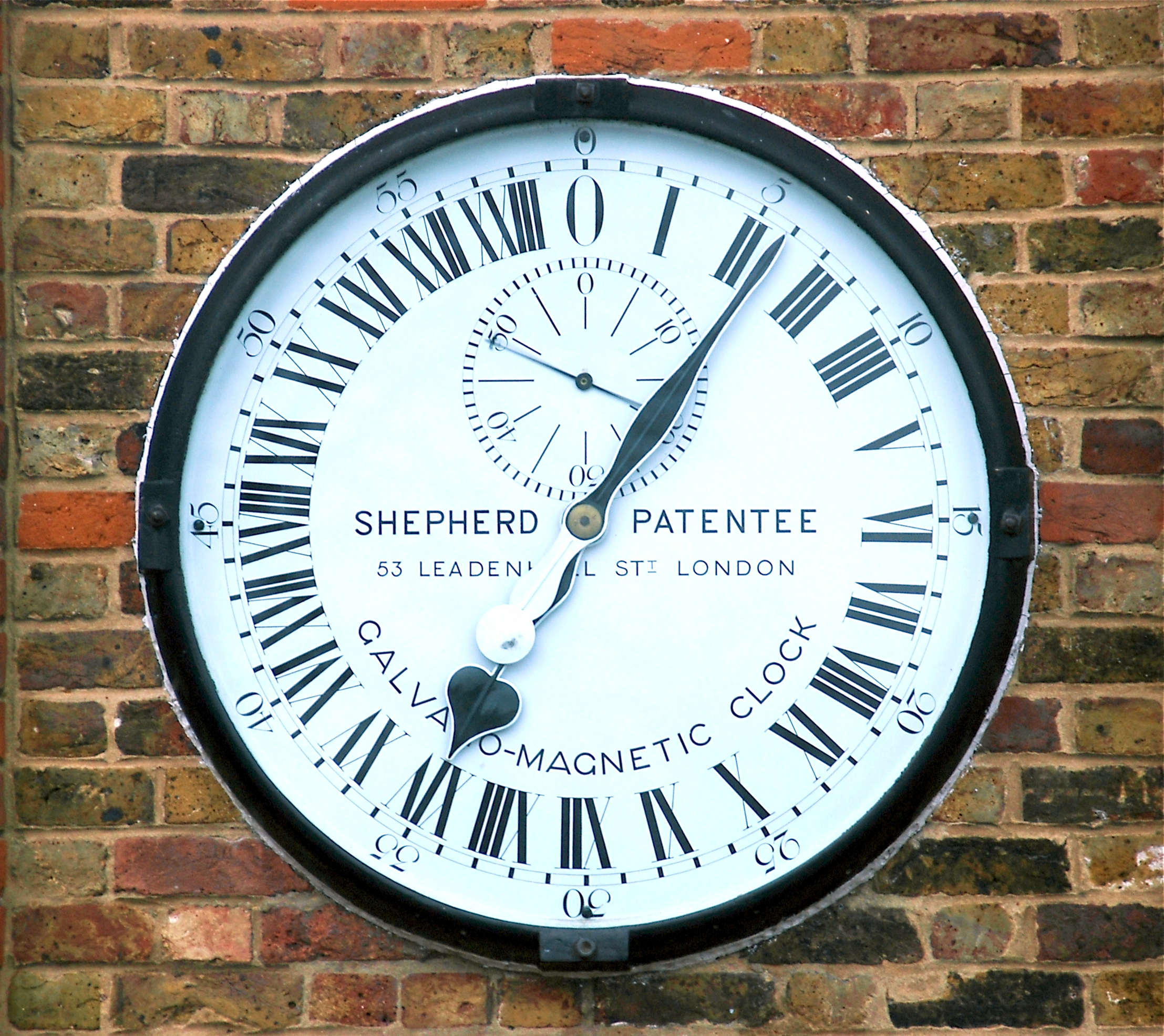
Shepherd Gate clock outside the Royal Observatory, Greenwich

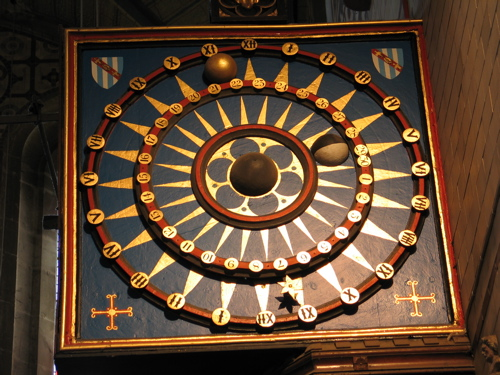
The clock at Ottery St Mary, England, showing nearly noon, using the 12-hour time system on a 24-hour analog dial

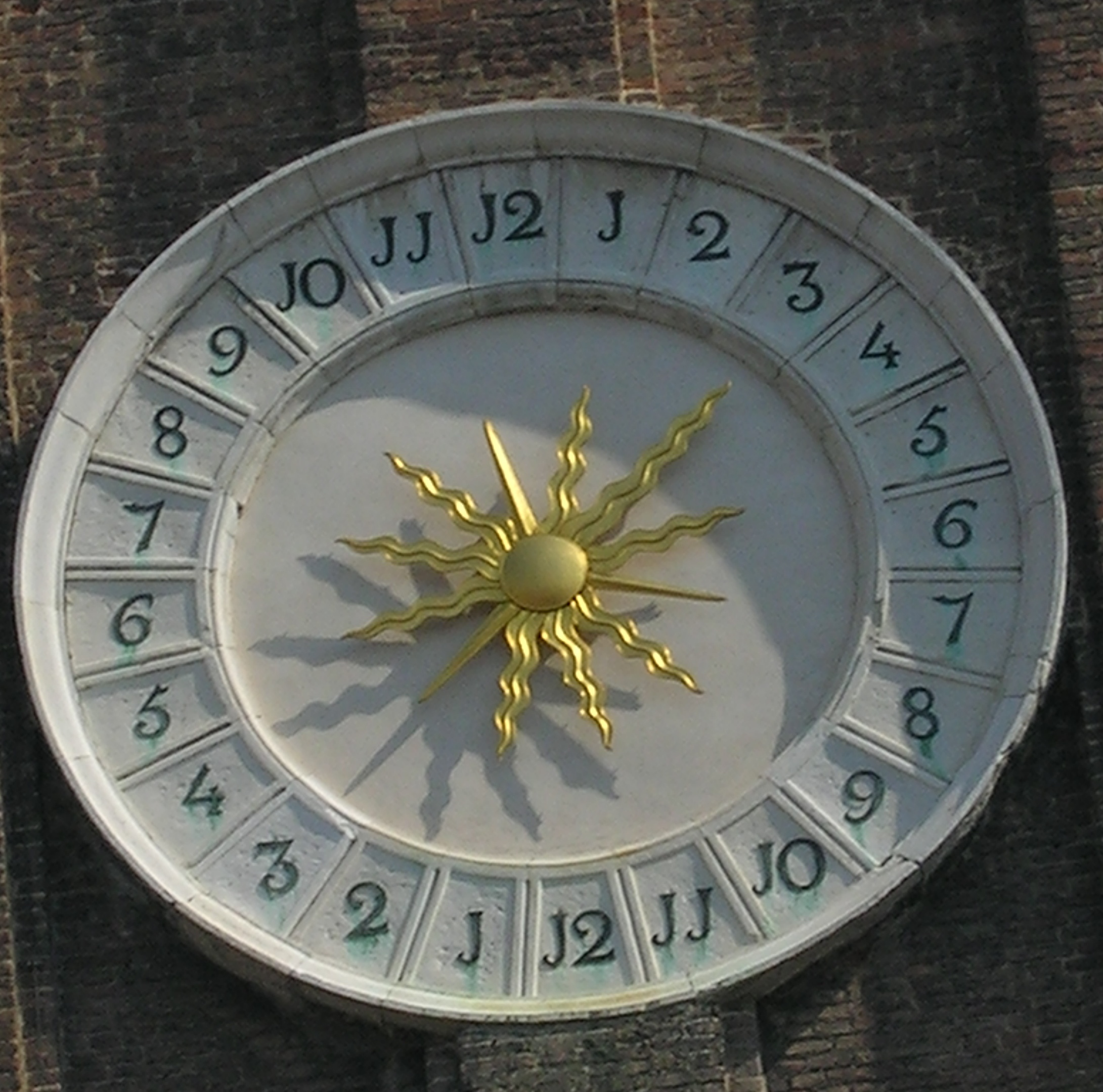
The 24-hour tower clock in Venice that uses double-XII system

Clocks and watches with a 24-hour analog dial have an hour hand that makes one complete revolution—360°—in a full day, or 24 hours per revolution. In contrast, the more familiar 12-hour analog dial has an hour hand that completes two revolutions per day, or 12 hours per revolution.

Twenty-four-hour analog clocks and watches are commonly used by logistics workers, firefighters, police officers, paramedics, nurses, pilots, scientists, and military personnel. They are often preferred because they present an unambiguous representation of the entire day at once. This definition specifically refers to the use of a full circular dial to represent a 24-hour cycle. Simply using numbers from 0 to 23 (or 1 to 24) is known as the 24-hour clock system.

Sundials also use 24-hour analog dials, as the shadow follows a path that repeats approximately once per day. Many sundials are marked with the double-XII (or double-12) system, where the numbers I to XII (or 1 to 12) appear twice—once for the morning and once for the afternoon and evening. Thus, VI (6) appears twice on many sundial dials: once near sunrise and once near sunset.

Modern 24-hour analog dials—aside from sundials—are almost always marked with 24 numbers or hour markers around the edge, following the 24-hour clock system. Because they display the entire day in one rotation, they do not require AM or PM indicators.

== History ==
The ancient Egyptians divided the day into 24 hours. There are diagrams of circles divided into 24 sections in the astronomical ceiling in the tomb of Senemut.

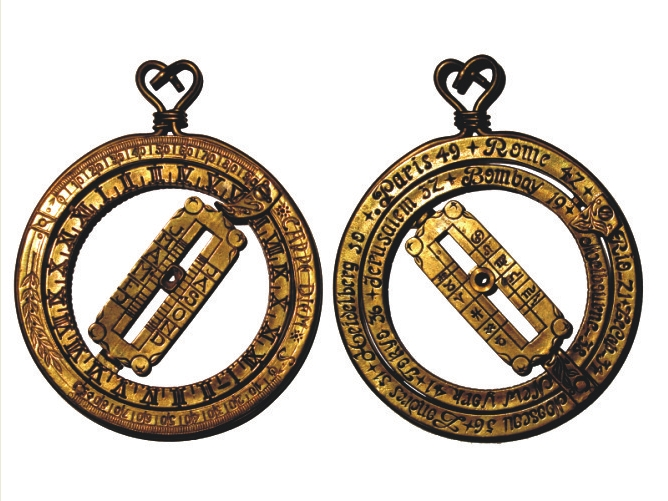
Sundial with 24-hour analog dial

Sundials use some or all of the 24-hour dial, because they show the position of the sun in the sky. Sometimes, for aesthetic rather than practical reasons, all the 24 hour marks are shown.

Medieval clocks often used the 24-hour analog dial, influenced by the widespread example of the astrolabe. In Northern Europe, the double-XII system was preferred: two sets of the Roman numerals I to XII were used, one on the left side for the night and morning hours, and another set on the right side of the dial to represent the afternoon and evening hours. In Italy, the numbers from 1 to 24 (I to XXIV in Roman numerals) were used, leading to the widespread use of the 24-hour system in that country. On Italian clocks, though, the I was often shown at the right side of the dial, rather than the top. This probably reflects the influence of the Italian timekeeping system, which started counting the hours of the day at sunset or twilight. In northern Europe, the double-XII system was gradually superseded during the 14th and 15th centuries by the single-XII (12-hour system), leading to the widespread adoption of the 12-hour dial for popular use. The 24-hour analog dial continued to be used, but primarily by technicians, astronomers, scientists, and clockmakers. John Harrison, Thomas Tompion, and Mudge built a number of clocks with 24-hour analog dials, particularly when building astronomical and nautical instruments. 24-hour dials were also used on sidereal clocks.

The famous Big Ben clock in London has a 24-hour dial as part of the mechanism, although it is not visible from the outside.

Astronauts used the 24-hour format due to the lack of day/night in the space environment.

In the 20th century, the 24-hour analog dial was adopted by radio amateurs, media, pilots, maritime, submariners, government, diplomats and for military use.

== Today ==
24-hour analog watches and clocks are still being manufactured today, and are sought after by collectors and enthusiasts. Manufacturers who make 24-hour analog watches include Glycine, Raketa, Vostok, Fortis, Poljot, Swatch, and many others.

== Design ==
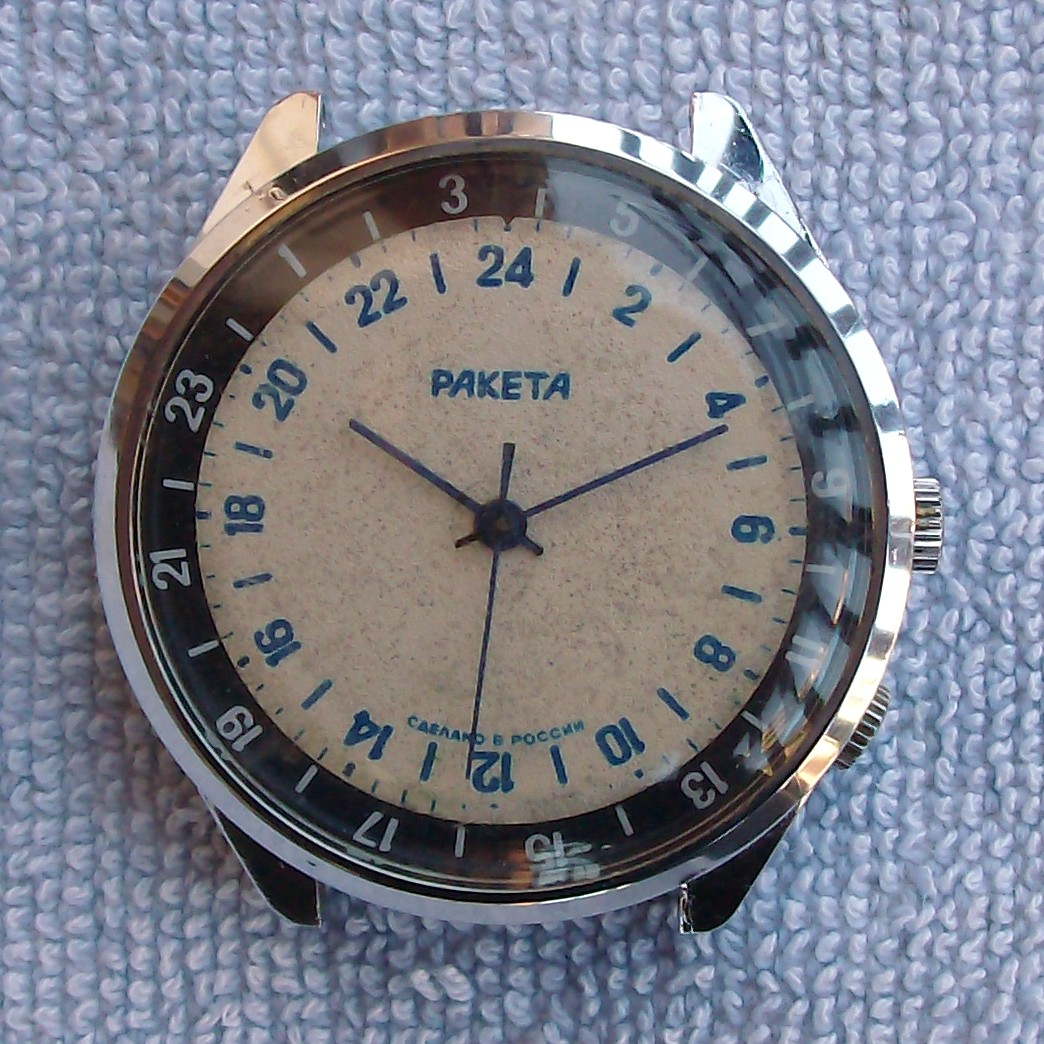
A 24-hour watch made by Russian watchmaker Raketa; the time shows 20:10 which, if on a 12-hour watch, would show 8:10 p.m.

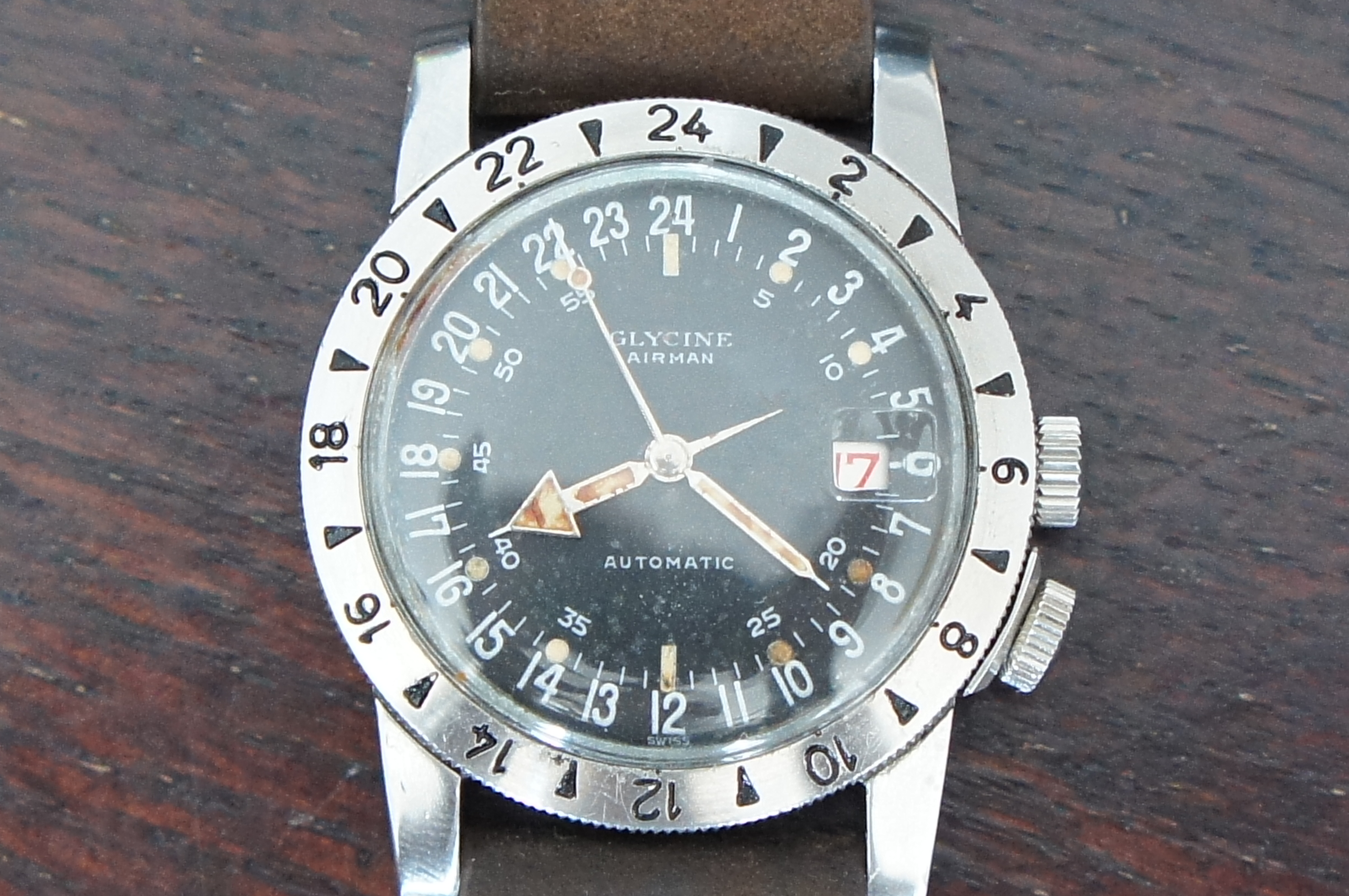
Glycine Airman

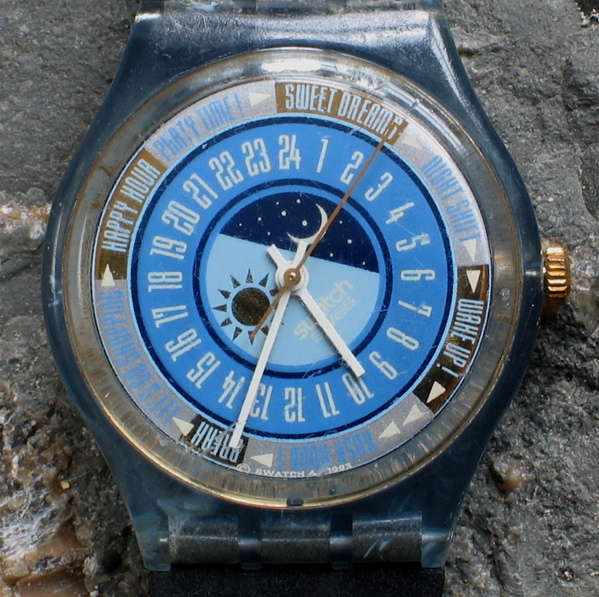
Swatch 24-hour watch

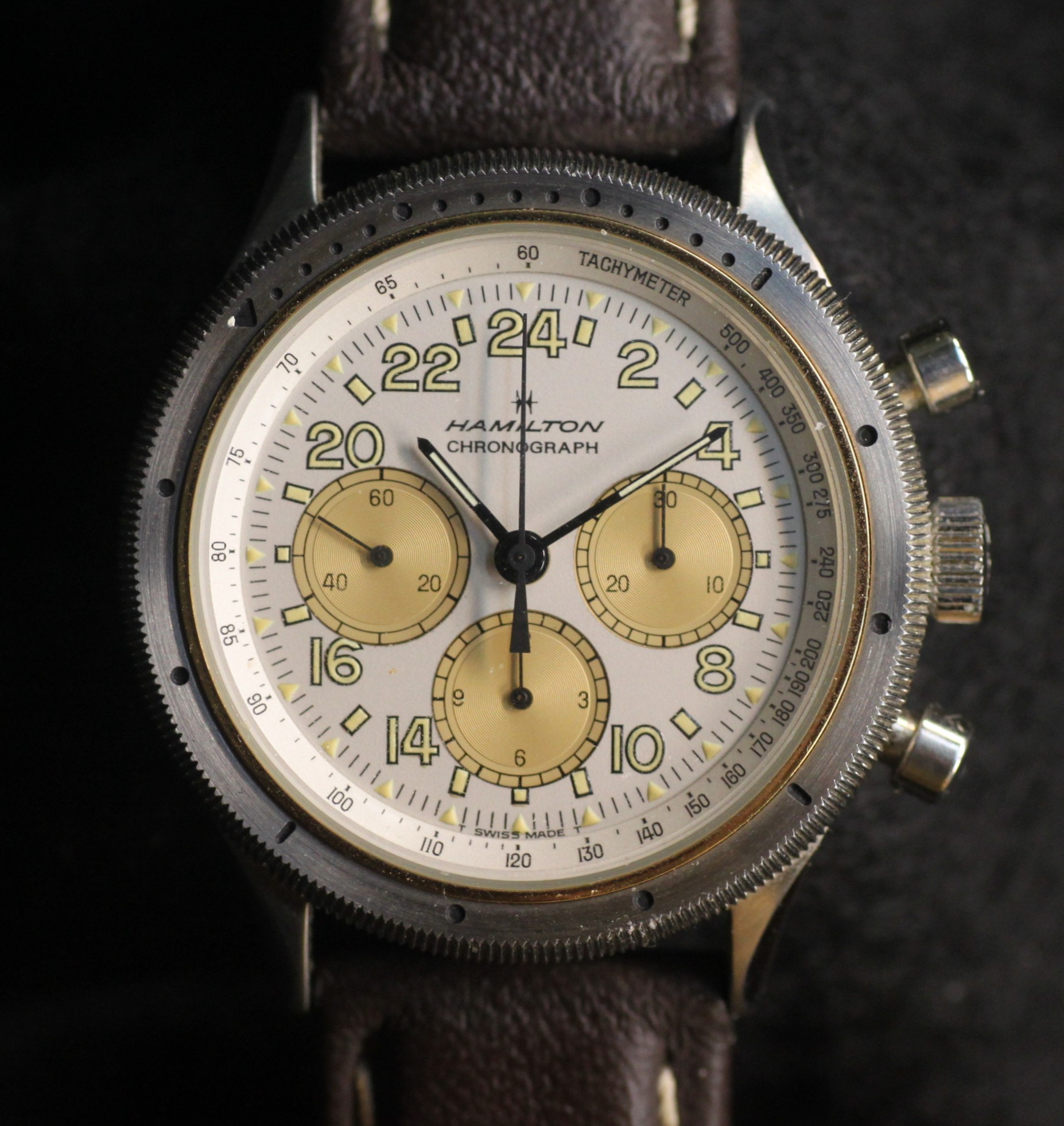
24-hour chronograph by Hamilton

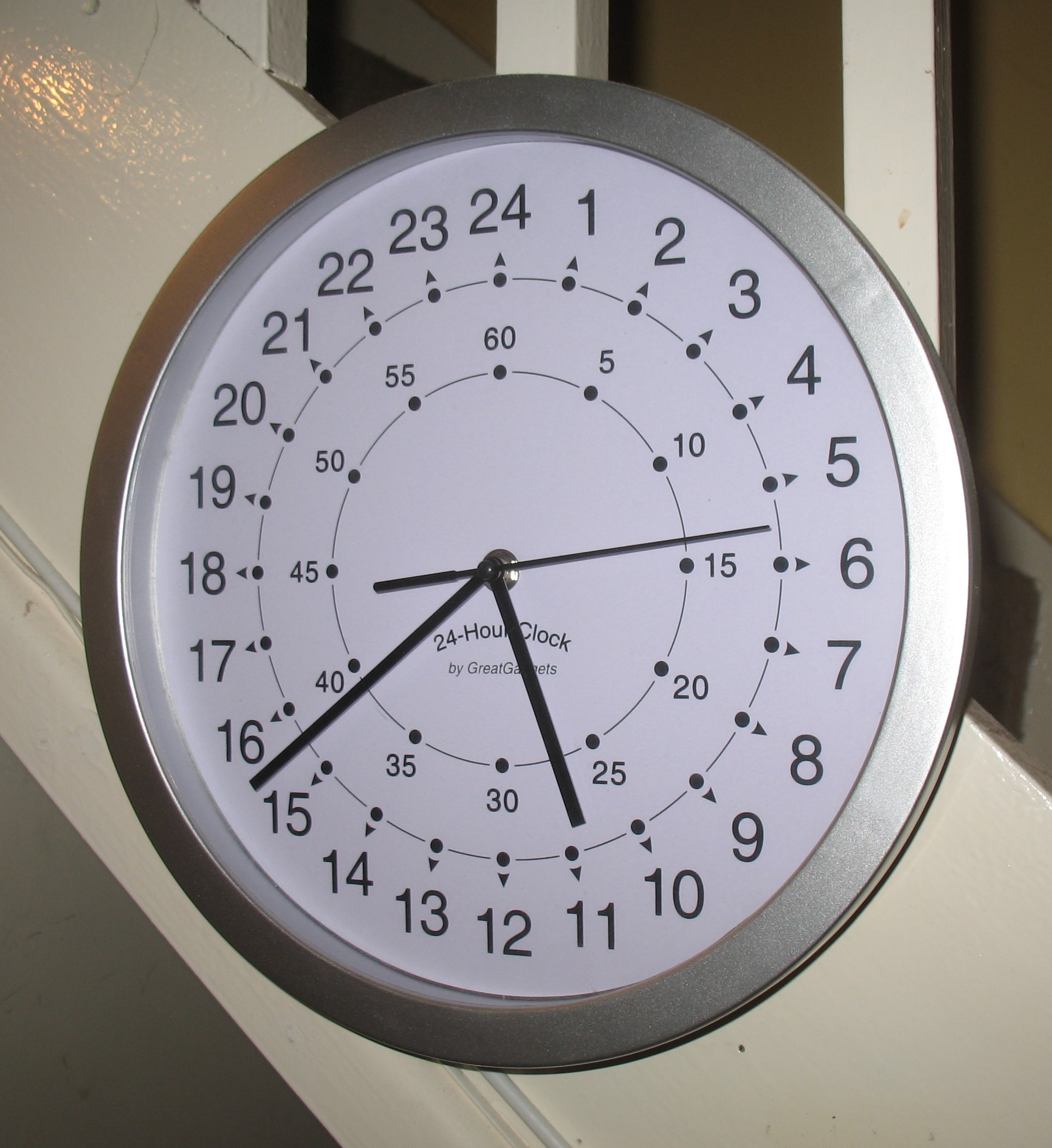
A modern quartz clock with a 24-hour face

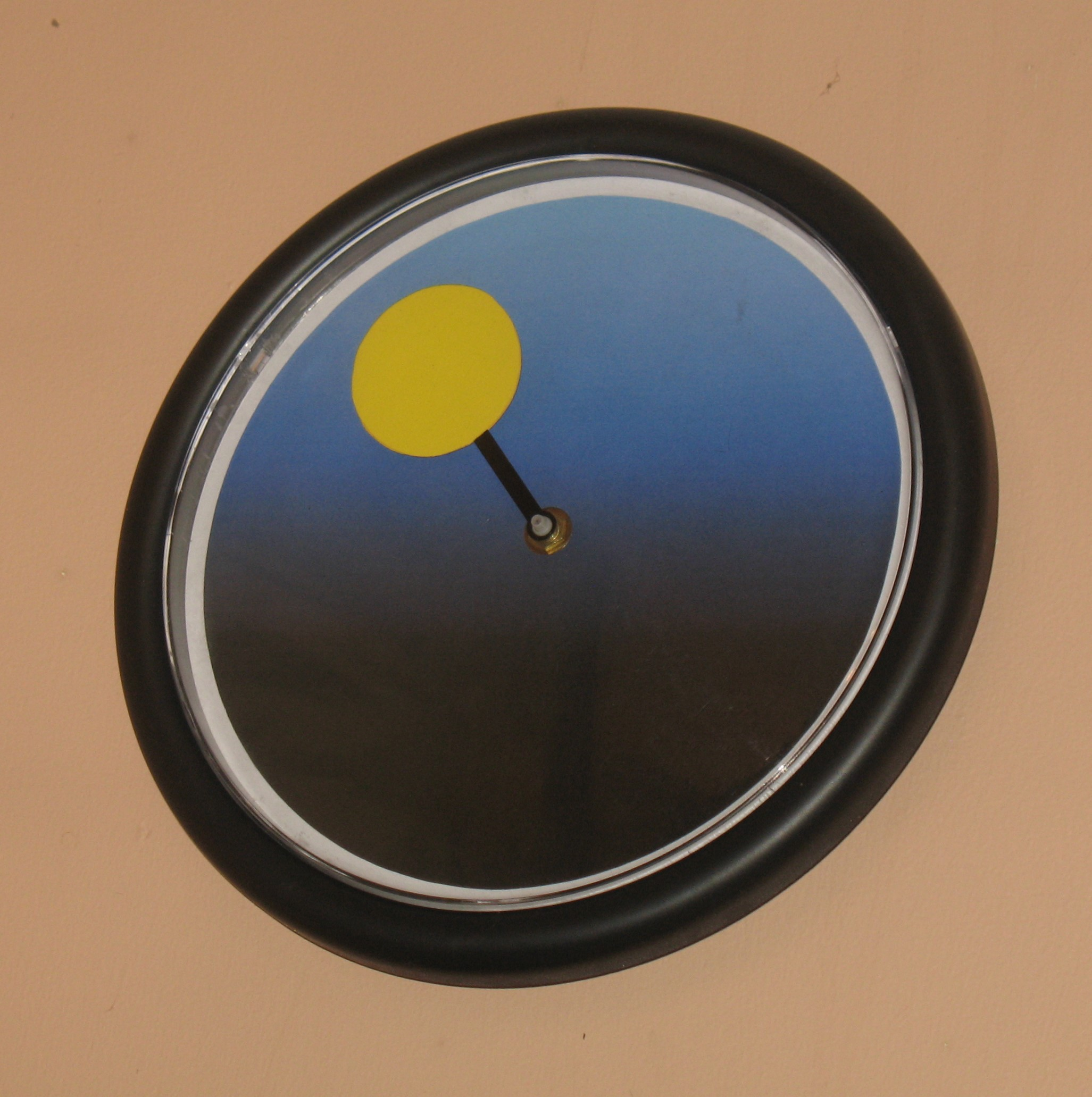
A simple 24 hour clock showing the approximate position of the sun

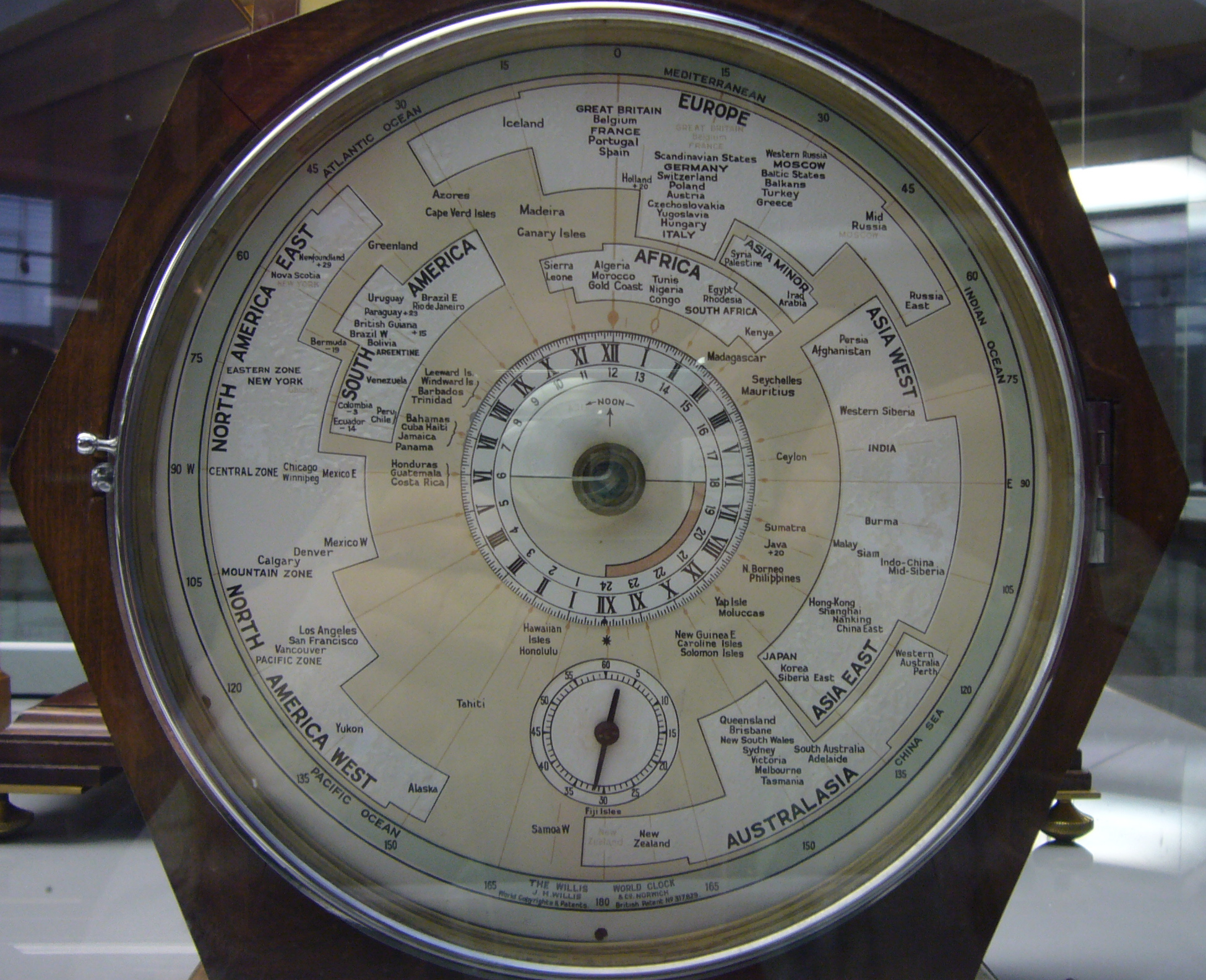
The Willis World Clock, which shows a stylized map of the world, helping to indicate the time in different time zones

The face of a 24-hour watch or 24-hour clock may be arranged in either of two ways: with noon at the top and midnight at the bottom (similar to how one might observe the passage of the Sun over their time zone whilst facing south), or else rotated 180° with midnight at the top and noon at the bottom. A few rare variants place noon and midnight at the right and left sides. There is no ambiguity if the 24-hour numbering is used. In the United States, the government and military commonly use 24-hour clocks having noon at the bottom; the variant with noon at the top is far less common.

Multiple time zones can be displayed by having multiple hour hands or a rotating bezel. The bezel is a ring around the outside of the watch's face. When it is used, the top of the watch always represents midnight (or noon) GMT. The bezel, which also has hour markings, is then rotated so that its numbering represents local time. So, a pilot always has GMT time available for talking to air traffic control and, when they land, only has to rotate the bezel to "set" the watch to their new local time. Glycine was the first to feature a 24-hour rotating bezel in 1953 with the Airman No.1 pilot watch. The design became widely known when Rolex designed the Rolex GMT Master for Pan-Am pilots in 1954.

A 24-hour watch with a compass card dial can be used to determine direction when set to local noon and used in conjunction with the Sun.

Many (but not all) digital watches can be set to show the time in 24-hour format.

=== Notable 24-hour watch brands ===
- AirNautic (Swiss)
- Akerfalk (Swedish)
- Armourlite Watch Company (US)
- Breitling (Swiss)
- Botta (German)
- Forté AAA watch club (US)
- Gallet (Swiss)
- Glycine (Swiss)
- Heuer (Swiss)
- Longines (Swiss)
- LÜM-TEC (Swiss)
- Messerschmitt (Swiss)
- Montblanc (Swiss)
- Ollech & Wajs (Swiss)
- Oris (Swiss)
- Poljot (Russian)
- Prioris (Swiss)
- Raketa (USSR Russian)
- Revue Thommen (Swiss)
- RLT watch co. (UK)
- Rolex (Swiss)
- Seiko (Japanese)
- Seizmont (Swiss)
- Slow watch (Swiss)
- Subdelta (Dutch)
- Svalbard (Swedish)
- Tauchmeister (Swiss)
- Wittnauer (US)
- Yes Watch (US)

=== World time ===
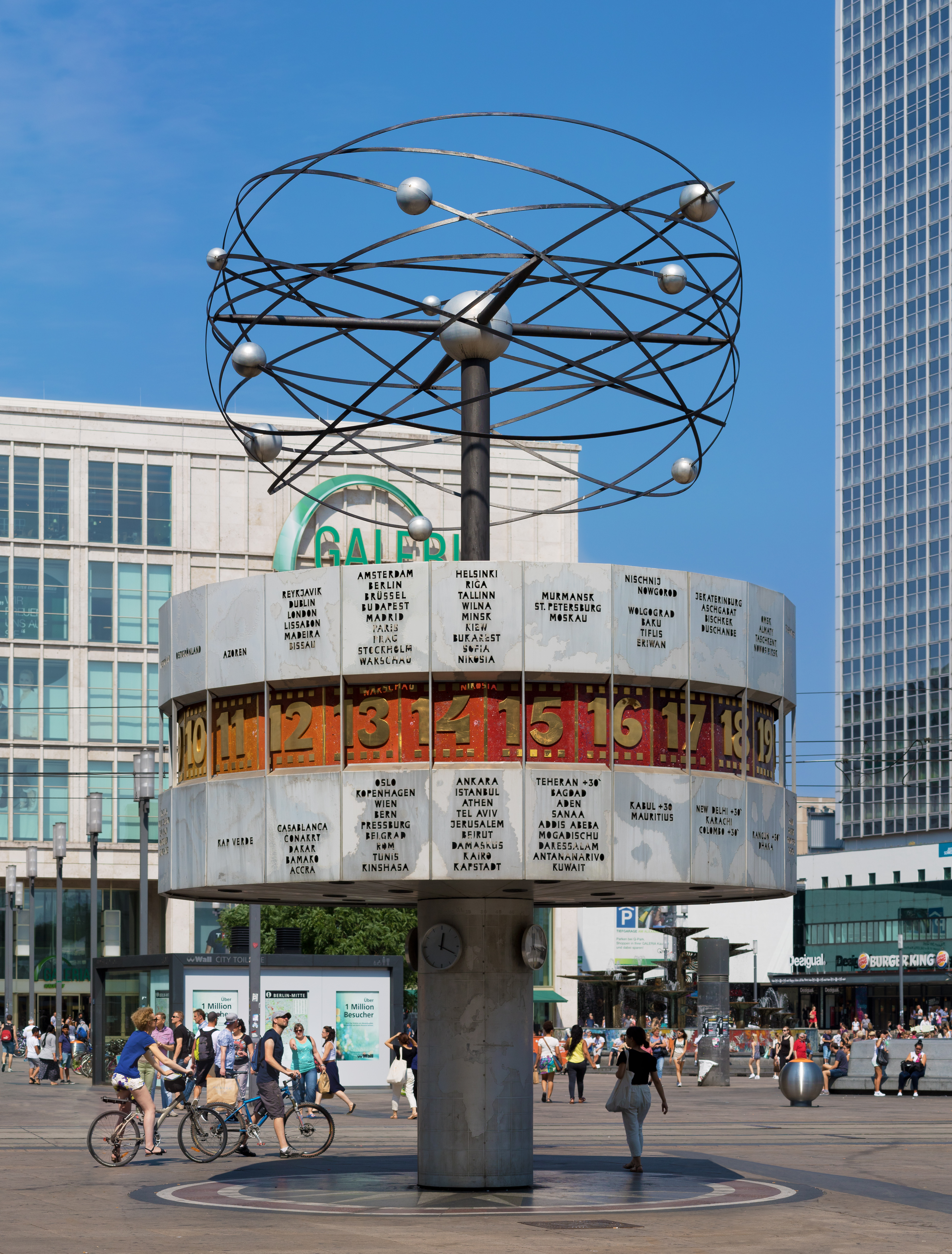
The World Clock in Alexanderplatz, Berlin, Germany

A common use for the 24-hour analog method of representing time is for showing the way the time of day depends on one's location. A globe, map, or disk can be used.

== In fiction ==
George Orwell uses the 12-hour and 24-hour dials to symbolize the old and new worlds in his novel Nineteen Eighty-Four. The 12-hour dial is a relic of pre-revolutionary society, used to represent the desirable past; the 24-hour dial and time system is the compulsory standard imposed by the Party, and represents both conformity and the undesirable nature of the new world. This theme is famously set in the opening line:

It was a bright cold day in April, and the clocks were striking thirteen.

In the 1927 film Metropolis, the opening scene shows both a 24-hour analog clock and a 10-hour (decimal) analog clock, one above the other. Both are used to convey the impression of an alien and highly efficient society.

In Jules Verne's 1870 science fiction masterpiece Twenty Thousand Leagues Under the Seas, Captain Nemo remarks that the clocks in the Nautilus use a 24-hour dial: "Now, look at that clock: it's electric, it runs with an accuracy rivaling the finest chronometers. I've had it divided into twenty–four hours like Italian clocks, since neither day nor night, sun nor moon, exist for me, but only this artificial light that I import into the depths of the seas! See, right now it's ten o'clock in the morning."

A watch with a 24-hour analog dial is important to the resolution of Alfred Bester's 1953 short story "The Roller Coaster".

== See also ==
- 24-hour clock
- Direction finding watch
- New Earth Time
- Sector clock
