= Heuer =

Heuer is a surname of German origin. An occupational name, it is either a variant of Hauer – the name for a woodcutter, butcher or stonemason – or derived from "höuwer" in Middle High German, meaning "haymaker".

The surname Heuer was first found in what are now Germany and Switzerland, where the earliest mentions of the name include Cunrat der Hewer in Württemberg in 1329, Heu in Konstanz, Hauwemenger in Frankfurt in 1387, and Heurechen in Zürich in 1400. The name could also be found in Bohemia and Moravia in the 14th century, especially within compound names, such as Heuleiter, Heureufel, Heubüschl, Heuteuer, and Heuradem.

== People with the surname ==
Notable people with the surname include:

- Beata Heuer-Christen (born 1935), Swiss soprano
- Codi Heuer (born 1996), American baseball player
- Edouard Heuer (1840–1892), Swiss founder of watch company Heuer
- Daniel Heuer Fernandes (born 1992), German-Portuguese footballer
- Heinz Heuer (1918–2002), German military police officer
- Jack Heuer (born 1932), last Swiss family representative of TAG Heuer
- Jannis Heuer (born 1999), German footballer
- Johannes Wolfgang Willy Friedlieb Heuer (1910–1993), German immigrant and founder of a family music business
- Otto Heuer (1854–1931), German literary historian
- Richards Heuer (1927–2018), American intelligence analyst
- Rolf-Dieter Heuer (born 1948), German particle physicist and former Director General of CERN
- Valter Heuer (1928–2006), Estonian writer and chess player
- Walter Heuer (sailor) (1892–1968), Brazilian Olympic sailor
- Walter Heuer (proofreader) (1908–1977), German proofreader and writer
- Werner Hoyer (born 1951), German economist and politician
- Wilhelm Heuer (1813–1890), German lithographer

== Heuer settlers in United States in the 18th century ==
- Konrad Heuer, who arrived in Pennsylvania in 1767
- Julius Heuer, who landed in America in 1780
- Peter Heuer, who landed in America in 1780
- August Heuer, who arrived in America in 1783

== Heuer settlers in United States in the 19th century ==
- Jacob Heuer who landed in Philadelphia in 1817
- Carl Christian Fr. Heuer and his wife and their three daughters settled in St. Louis, Missouri
- Daniel Heuer, aged 34, who arrived in America in 1839
- Michael Heuer, who arrived in America in 1839
- Joachim Heuer, who arrived in America in 1839

== Heuer Settlers in United States in the 20th century ==
- David Heuer and his wife and two children settled in Philadelphia in 1912

== Heuer settlers in Canada in the 18th Century ==
- August Heuer, who settled in Canada in 1783 after serving as a mercenary soldier with the British during the American Revolution

== Contemporary notables of the name Heuer (post-1700) ==
- Robert Heuer (1916–1951), German highly decorated Oberleutnant in the Luftwaffe during World War II
- Robert M Heuer, American general manager and chief executive officer of the Florida Grand Opera
- Chris Heuer, American Internet entrepreneur from San Francisco
- William C. F. Heuer, American Democratic politician, member of Minnesota State Senate 51st District, 1955–59; Alternate Delegate to Democratic National Convention from Minnesota, 1956
- Melvin E. Heuer, American politician, Republican candidate for U.S. Representative from Michigan 16th District, 1978
- Henry J. Heuer, American politician, candidate for U.S. Representative from New York 5th District, 1908
- Ann F. Heuer, American politician, delegate to Republican National Convention from District of Columbia, 1988
- Albert R. Heuer, American politician, village president of River Rouge, Michigan, 1921–22

== Historic Events for the Heuer family ==
=== Bismarck ===
- Bernhard Heuer (1922–2018), German Matrose who served aboard the German Battleship Bismarck during World War II when it was sunk heading to France; he survived the sinking

== See also ==
- TAG Heuer, a Swiss watchmaker known for its sports watches and chronographs.
- W. Heuer Pianos and instruments Stellenbosch https://www.wheuer.co.za/
- Hoya (disambiguation)
