= Spainhower (surname) =

Spainhower is a surname. Notable people with the surname include:

- Dale Spainhower, American politician
- Jim Spainhower (1928–2018), American politician

== See also ==
- Spain
- Hower
