= Hoja =

Hoja may refer to:

- Höja, a locality in Ängelholm Municipality, Sweden
- Höja, Malmö, a neighbourhood of Malmö, Sweden
- Hoja or Hodja, a Turkish honorific

== See also ==
- La Hoja Digital, a newspaper in Paraguay
- Hoia (disambiguation)
- Hojai
- Hoxha (surname)
