= Walter Heuer =

Walter Heuer may refer to:

- Walter Heuer (proofreader) (1908–1977), Swiss proofreader and writer on the German language
- Walter Heuer (sailor) (1892–1968), Brazilian sailor at the 1936 Summer Olympics
