= Hower =

Hower is a surname. Notable people with the name include:

- Jim Hower (1931–2008), Australian rules footballer
- Nancy Hower (born 1966), American actress, director, screenwriter and producer
- Phil Hower (1942–2014), American football coach and educator

== See also ==
- Hower-Slote House, located at Lewis Township, Northumberland County, Pennsylvania
- Hauer, surname
