= Slow watch =

Swiss watch company

Slow watch is a line of 24-hour analog dial watches made by Slow watches.

== Watches ==
The watches made by Slow watches have a minimalist design, with only one hand. The watch faces mark out 24 hours rather than the traditional 12 hours, with 12 noon located at the top of the face. They are available in over 15 different styles, with both octagonal and round cases. Dashes on the clock face are quarters of an hour as opposed to the usual markings per minute.

== History ==
The Slow watches company was created by Corvin Lask and Christopher Noerskau, with Swiss watch designers Gabriele Guidi and May Margot as partners. They began development of the company in 2011 and opened for business in 2013. Lask and Noerskau wanted to create a watch that would remind people to appreciate their available time.

== Reception ==
In 2015 GQ named Slow watches one of the '100 Best things in the world right now', describing them as "beautifully rugged" and "fantastic quality". Slow watches were included in the 2015 Oscars' goodie bags, provided to attendees of the ceremony.
