= Hoia =

Hoia may refer to:

- Hoia Forest, in Romania
- Hoia (crustacean), a genus of parasitic crustaceans in the family Chondracanthidae

== See also ==
- HolA, a bacterial gene
- Hoja (disambiguation)
- Hoya (disambiguation)
