= Invicta Watch Group =

Swiss watch company

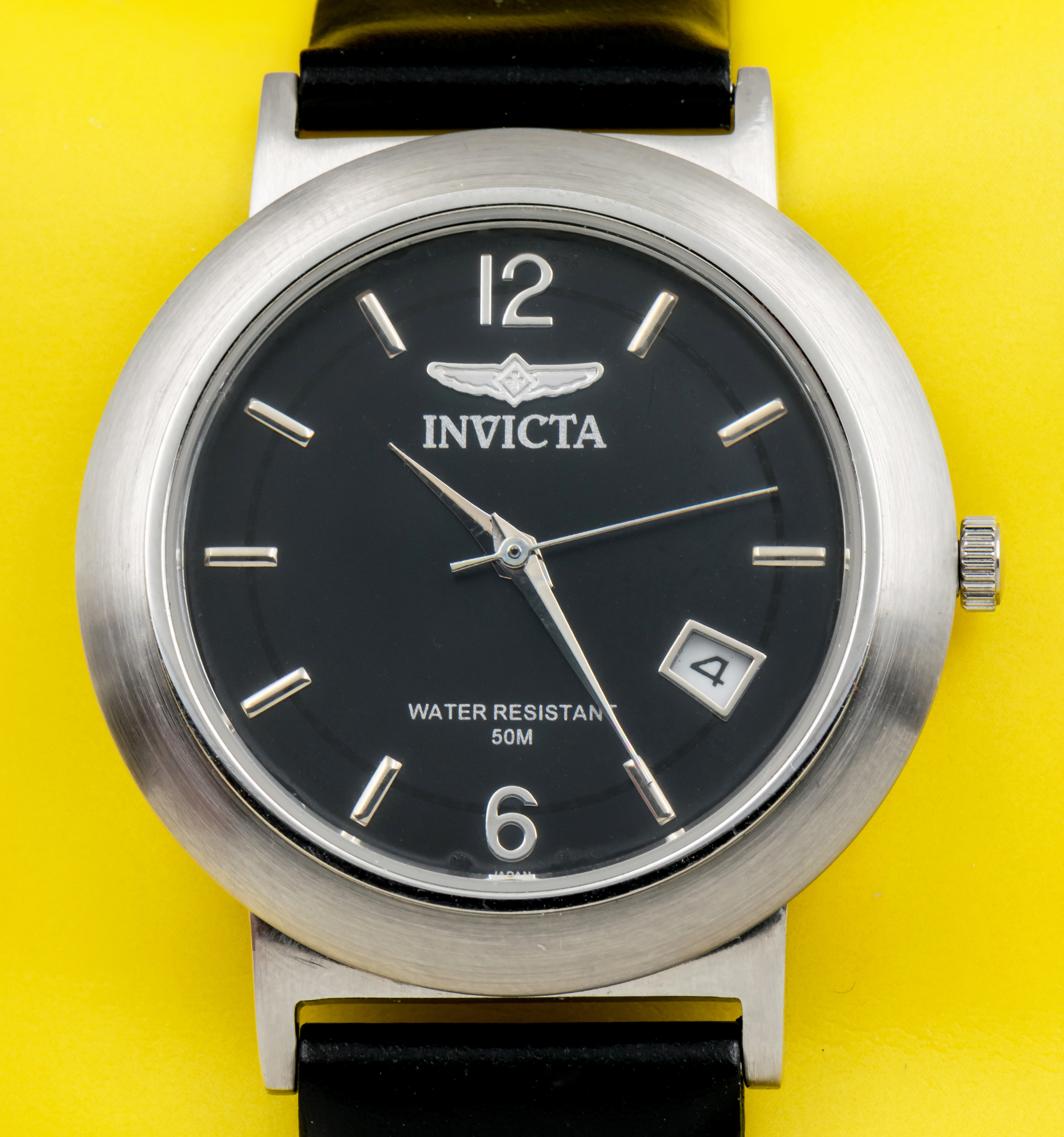
- Type: Private
- Industry: Watchmaking
- Founded: 1837; 189 years ago in La Chaux-de-Fonds, Switzerland
- Founder: Raphael Picard
- Headquarters: 3069 Taft Street; Hollywood, Florida, U.S. 33021
- Key people: Eyal Lalo (President, CEO); Gany Lalo (Vice President); Nadia Lalo (Board Member, Secretary)
- Products: Wristwatches
- Subsidiaries: Glycine Watch SA; Invicta Racing
- Website: invictawatch.com

Invicta is a watch designer and manufacturer headquartered in Hollywood, Florida. The Invicta name first appeared as a Swiss watch company in 1837 founded by Raphael Picard in La Chaux-de-Fonds, Switzerland.

== History ==
=== Founding and early years ===
Invicta was established in 1837 by Raphael Picard in La Chaux-de-Fonds, Switzerland. Picard’s vision was to produce high-quality Swiss timepieces at prices affordable to a broad customer base. The company remained under the Picard family’s ownership for over a century, operating as Les Fils de R. Picard (Picard’s sons) and gaining a reputation for well-made yet reasonably priced watches.

Invicta earned industry acclaim in its early decades – for example, it won a gold medal at the 1914 Swiss National Exhibition in Bern, reflecting the brand’s prestige at that time. In 1928, the firm was reorganized as a joint-stock company, Invicta S.A., with a capitalization of 1 million Swiss francs.

By the mid-20th century, Invicta had expanded internationally and introduced additional brand names for certain markets. The company’s watches were marketed not only under the Invicta name but also under brands such as Seeland and Eno for export. In 1940, Invicta established a foothold in the United States through distributor Morris Hoffman, who created Invicta-Seeland Inc. in New York.

During World War II, Invicta supplied military-issue watches to Allied forces, especially to the U.S., gaining a reputation for durable Swiss timepieces. The post-war era saw Invicta thrive as a producer of mass-market mechanical watches – by the 1950s, its waterproof and shockproof wristwatches were popular globally. Notably, in 1959, Invicta received a commission from the USSR’s Council of Labor and Defense to produce exclusive Swiss-made watches for Soviet Navy officers.

=== Quartz crisis and corporate changes (1970s–1980s) ===
Like many Swiss watchmakers, Invicta faced difficulties during the quartz revolution of the 1970s. In 1968, the company joined the Swiss watchmaking consortium Société des Garde-Temps (SGT), alongside brands such as Sandoz, Silvana, and Waltham. SGT allowed Invicta to pool resources and access electronic watch technologies including quartz and LED.

By 1973, SGT had become the third-largest Swiss watch group, but economic downturns and Asian quartz competition led to its collapse in 1981. Invicta’s operating company (known then as ISECA S.A., a merger of Invicta and Seeland) went bankrupt and was liquidated in 1982.

After liquidation, Invicta’s trademarks and assets were sold. In the early 1980s, the Swiss firm Ondix S.A. acquired rights to the brand and produced a new line of Invicta watches in Biel/Bienne. However, Ondix failed to revive the brand commercially, and the company ceased operations by the end of the 1980s.

=== Revival in the 1990s ===
In 1991, the Invicta brand was acquired by an American investment group led by Eyal Lalo, a third-generation watchmaker whose family had been involved in Invicta’s distribution decades earlier. Lalo founded the Invicta Watch Company of America and established its headquarters in Hollywood, Florida.

The revived company focused on offering modern automatic and mechanical watches with Swiss components at accessible prices. While updating design and branding, Invicta retained traditional elements such as Swiss movements and sapphire crystals. This strategy successfully positioned Invicta as an "affordable luxury" brand during the 1990s and 2000s.

By the early 2000s, the company began using the name Invicta Watch Group to reflect a growing portfolio. In 2016, it acquired Swiss brand Glycine Watch SA, founded in 1914, pledging to preserve its independence and identity.

In June 2023, Invicta's U.S. retail affiliate, Invicta Stores LLC, filed for Chapter 11 bankruptcy protection to restructure operations and reduce its retail footprint.

In 2023 Invicta joined forces with the British racing team Virtuosi Racing, forming Invicta Virtuosi Racing. The partnership evolved into a partial takeover from Invicta in 2024, which led to the birth of Invicta Racing, followed by a full takeover in 2025.

== Lineup ==
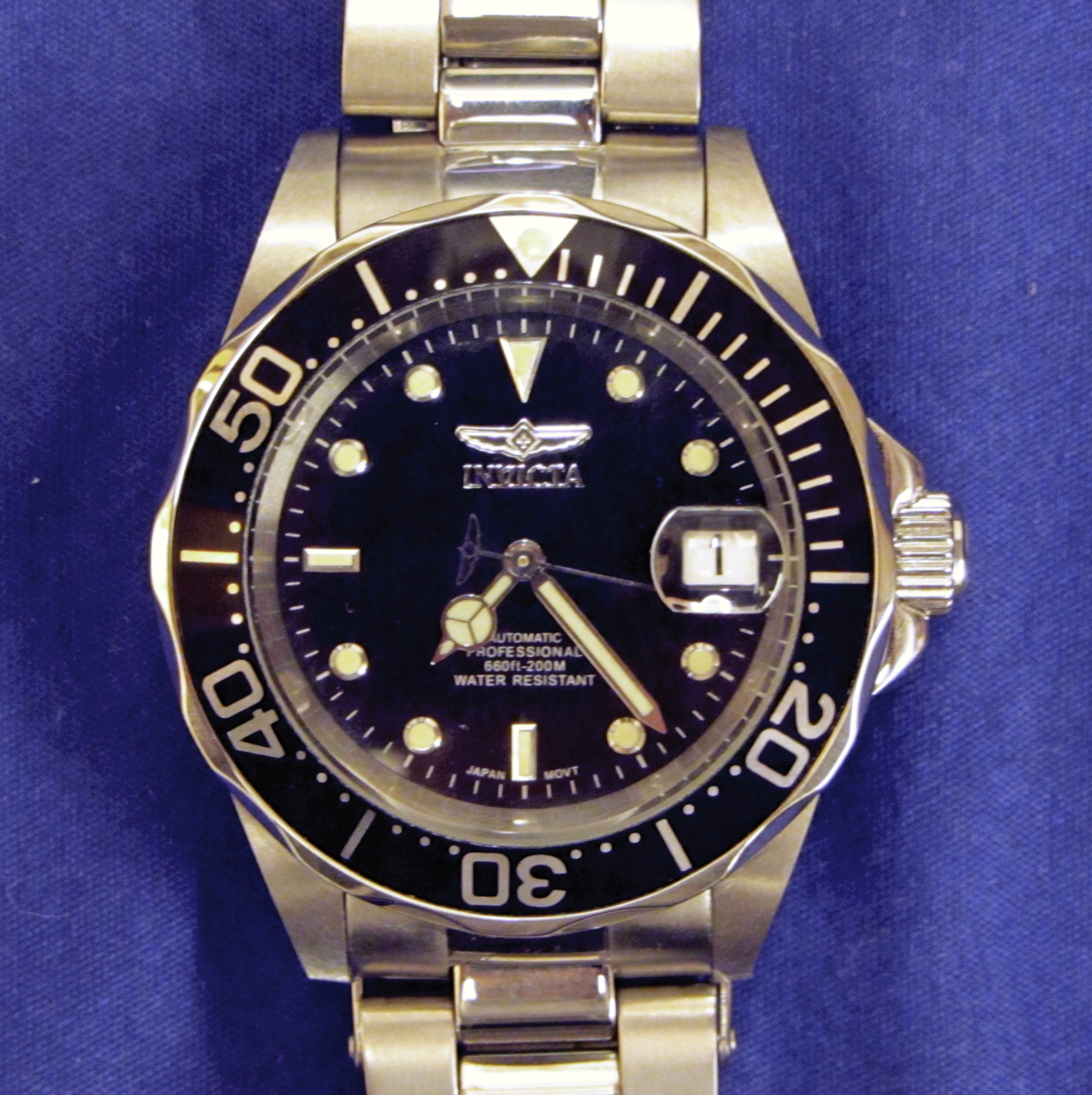
Invicta Automatic Pro Diver Watch 8926

Invicta's watch lineup encompasses dozens of collections across a wide range of styles, from rugged diving and sport watches to ornate fashion timepieces. The brand was relaunched in the 1990s and found success in the early 2000s with the introduction of the Lupah and Pro Diver lines, which helped popularize the trend of oversized watch cases (ranging roughly from 47 mm up to 55 mm in diameter) in its catalog. Since then, Invicta’s offerings have expanded to over 30 distinct series for men and women, covering everything from dive watches to urban-styled dress models. The company now designs around 1,500 new models each year.

Many Invicta models feature robust specifications such as high water resistance (200 meters or more on numerous dive pieces) and the use of Invicta’s proprietary “Flame Fusion” crystals for improved scratch resistance. Flame Fusion is a process that fuses a layer of sapphire glass onto a mineral crystal, providing near-sapphire hardness at lower cost. To keep prices accessible, the majority of Invicta watches use Japanese movements (such as the Seiko NH35A automatic) and are assembled in Asian manufacturing facilities. However, Invicta also produces a select portion of its lineup in Switzerland—those models are marked “Swiss Made” on the dial and typically house Swiss movements such as the Sellita SW200 or SW500, meeting the criteria for Swiss-made labeling.

Invicta often markets features like Tritnite luminous hands and markers (the brand’s in-house luminescent paint) and oversized stainless steel cases, underscoring the emphasis on durability and bold appearance in its technical design.

Notable current collections include:

- Pro Diver – Flagship dive-watch series inspired by classic Swiss dive designs, often powered by the Seiko NH35A movement and featuring Flame Fusion crystals and 200m water resistance.
- Lupah – Known for its distinctive curved rectangular crystal and bold case shapes; introduced during Invicta's early 2000s brand expansion.
- Russian Diver – Based on a 1950s Soviet naval prototype; originally introduced as a limited commemorative line in 2007 and later became a staple collection.
- Subaqua – A performance-inspired sports collection known for intricate dial work, chronographs, and oversized 50mm+ cases.
- Venom – Bold dive-style chronographs with high-pressure water resistance (up to 1000 meters on some models).
- Bolt – Distinctive for its stainless steel cable wire design integrated around the bezel; launched in the 2010s as part of Invicta’s Reserve line.
- Wildflower – Designed for women, with delicate bracelet-style cases and colorful dial variations.
- Invicta Reserve – Premium label for select models across collections; features upgraded materials, automatic Swiss movements, and limited-edition runs.

According to retail sources, the Pro Diver, Venom, Subaqua, Wildflower, Russian Diver, and Bolt lines are among Invicta's most popular offerings globally.

Invicta has also created numerous licensed and celebrity-themed series. The company holds licensing agreements with major entertainment brands such as Disney (including Marvel and Star Wars), DC Comics, Warner Bros., and the NFL, offering limited-edition themed watches.

In November 2012, Invicta launched a line of watches endorsed and co-designed by Pro Football Hall of Fame NFL player Jason Taylor.

In February 2020, the company announced a multi-year deal with Authentic Brands Group for a co-branded collection with Shaquille O'Neal. The Shaq Signature Series features oversized designs reflecting O’Neal’s style and was promoted via Invicta’s long-running programming on ShopHQ.
