= Hoya =

Hoya may refer to:

== Places ==
- Hoya, Germany, a city in Lower Saxony, Germany
- County of Hoya, a former state in present Germany
- Hōya, Tokyo, now incorporated within Nishi-tokyo, Tokyo, Japan
- Hoya, Hpruso, a place in Hpruso Township, Kayah, Myanmar
- Hoya, Spain, a hamlet in Lorca, Spain
- Hoya, Zimbabwe, a ward of Zimbabwe

== Other uses ==
- Hoya (plant), a genus of flowering plants
- Hoya (singer), a former member of the South Korean band Infinite
- Hoya Corporation, a Japanese company that manufactures optical equipment
- The Hoya, a campus newspaper at Georgetown University
- Georgetown Hoyas, the athletic teams of Georgetown University
- Sea pineapple or hoya, a species of edible sea squirt
- Hoya (speed cubing method), a method to solve a 4x4x4, 5x5x5 and other big cubes.

== See also ==
- Heuer
- Hoia (disambiguation)
- Hoya Saxa, the college yell of Georgetown University
- Hoyas (EP) by S. Carey
