= Glycine Watch =

Swiss watch manufacturer

Glycine Watch SA

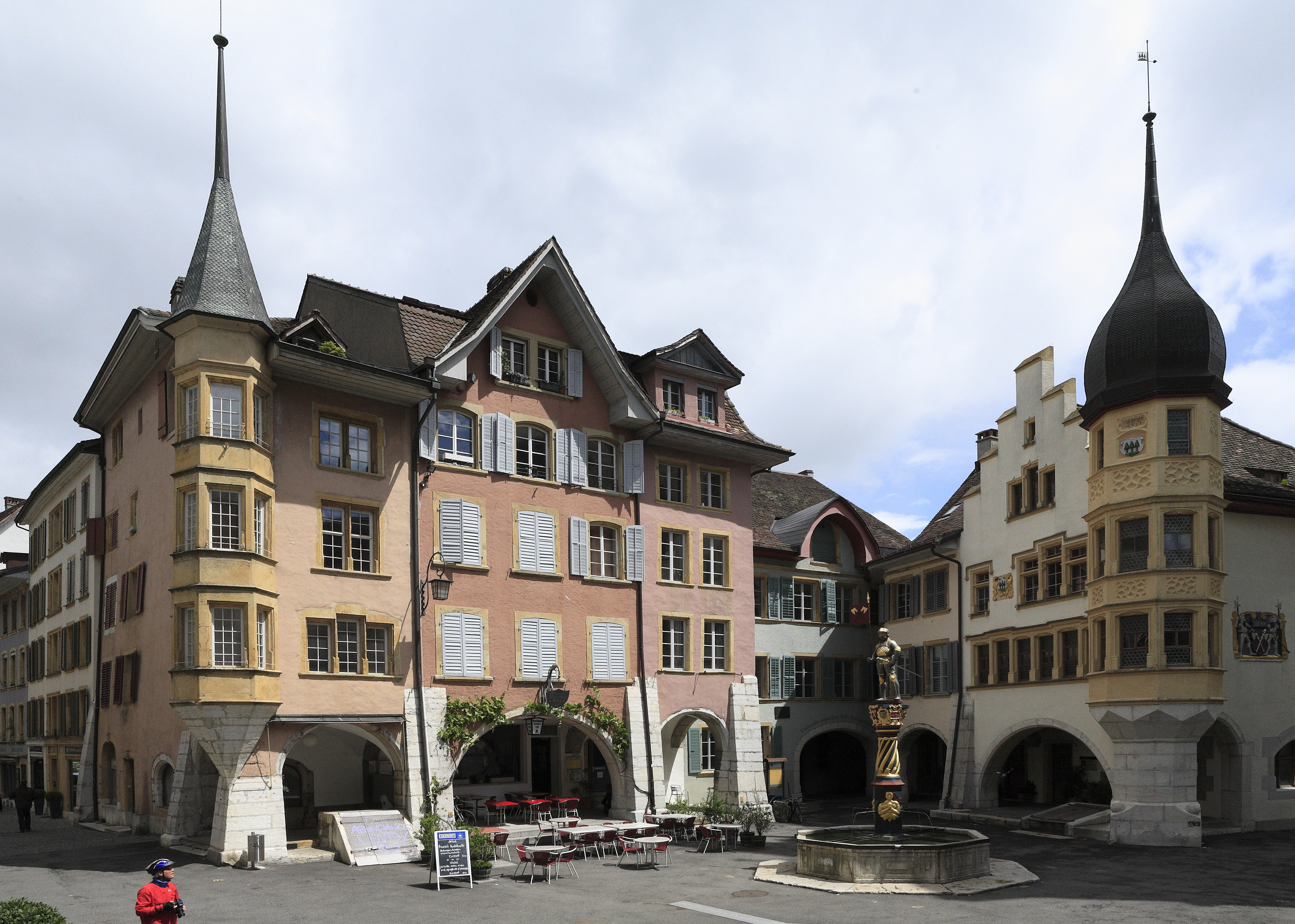
- Glycine headquarters, Biel/Bienne, Switzerland
- Formerly: La Glycine (1914–1916); Fabrique d’Horlogerie La Glycine, Piccola et Joffrette (1916–1923); Fabrique d’Horlogerie La Glycine (1922–1963)
- Type: Subsidiary
- Industry: Watchmaking
- Founded: 1914; 112 years ago in Biel/Bienne, Switzerland
- Founder: Eugène Meylan
- Headquarters: Ring 18; CH-2502 Biel/Bienne; Switzerland; 47.141791°N 7.246484°E
- Area served: Worldwide
- Key people: Eyal Lalo (Parent Group CEO); Daniele Andreatta (Managing Director)
- Products: Watches
- Parent: Invicta Watch Group
- Website: glycine-watch.ch

Glycine Watch SA, or simply Glycine (/ˈɡlaɪsiːn/), is a Swiss watchmaker founded in 1914 in Biel/Bienne (BE), Switzerland, where its manufacturing and headquarters remain today. In 1930, Glycine released the first mass-produced automatic watches, and in 1959, it developed vacuum-sealed cases, allowing for more durable and water-resistant timepieces. The Glycine Airman, the first watch capable of tracking two 24-hour time zones, has been used extensively in commercial and military aviation, as well as in spaceflights; notable examples include its use by United States Air Force pilots during the Vietnam War and astronaut Pete Conrad during the Gemini 5 and Gemini 11 spaceflights.

Since 2016, Glycine has been owned by Invicta Watch Group.

== History ==
=== 1891–1940: Early history ===
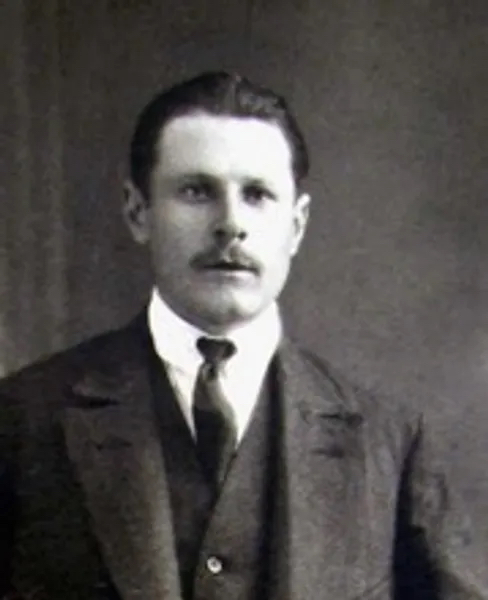
Eugène Meylan

Eugène Meylan was born in 1891 in Le Chenit, Switzerland, and attended watchmaking school at School Of Arts Appliqués (Ecole d'arts appliqués) in La Chaux-de-Fonds from 1910 to 1911. Meylan was noted to be a gifted student, receiving top rating for a watch he submitted to the COSC while a student. In 1914, at age 23, Meylan established his watch company La Glycine in Biel/Bienne. Two years later, watchmakers Piccola and Joffrette became co-owners of the company and La Glycine became Fabrique d’Horlogerie La Glycine, Piccola et Joffrette. In the 1920s, the watch company mostly made pocket watches and women's watches that were known for their interchangeable components, allowing them to be serviced more easily than the competition. In 1922, the company and its factory were sold to Pretto Watch Company owner Ferdinand Engel and watchmaker George Flury and was renamed Fabrique d’Horlogerie La Glycine.

The watch company is named for the Wisteria genus of plant, known as fleur de Glycine in French. Katharina Brechbühler, owner of Glycine in the 2000s, claims the company's name is a result of its founding during the Jugendstil period, when plant-inspired motifs and floral designs were in fashion. Fleur de Glycine was chosen due to its vining growth structure found in a multitude of conditions, similar to Glycine watches, designed to tolerate a multitude of harsh conditions like diving and outer space. The plant flourishes without much care, like the reliable watches Glycine has strived to produce throughout its history.

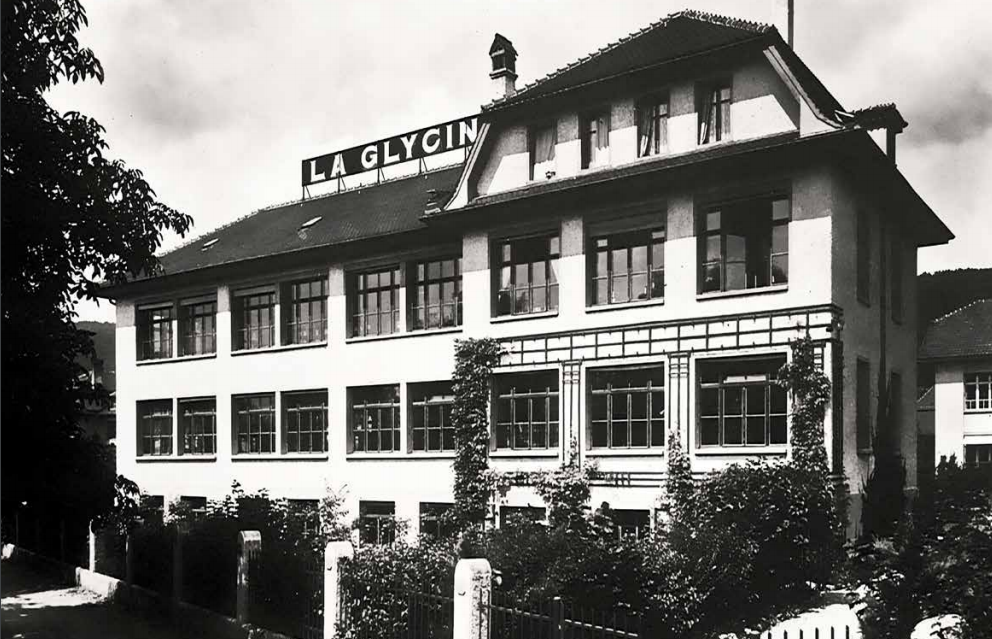
Glycine factory with fleur de Glycine growing on its exterior

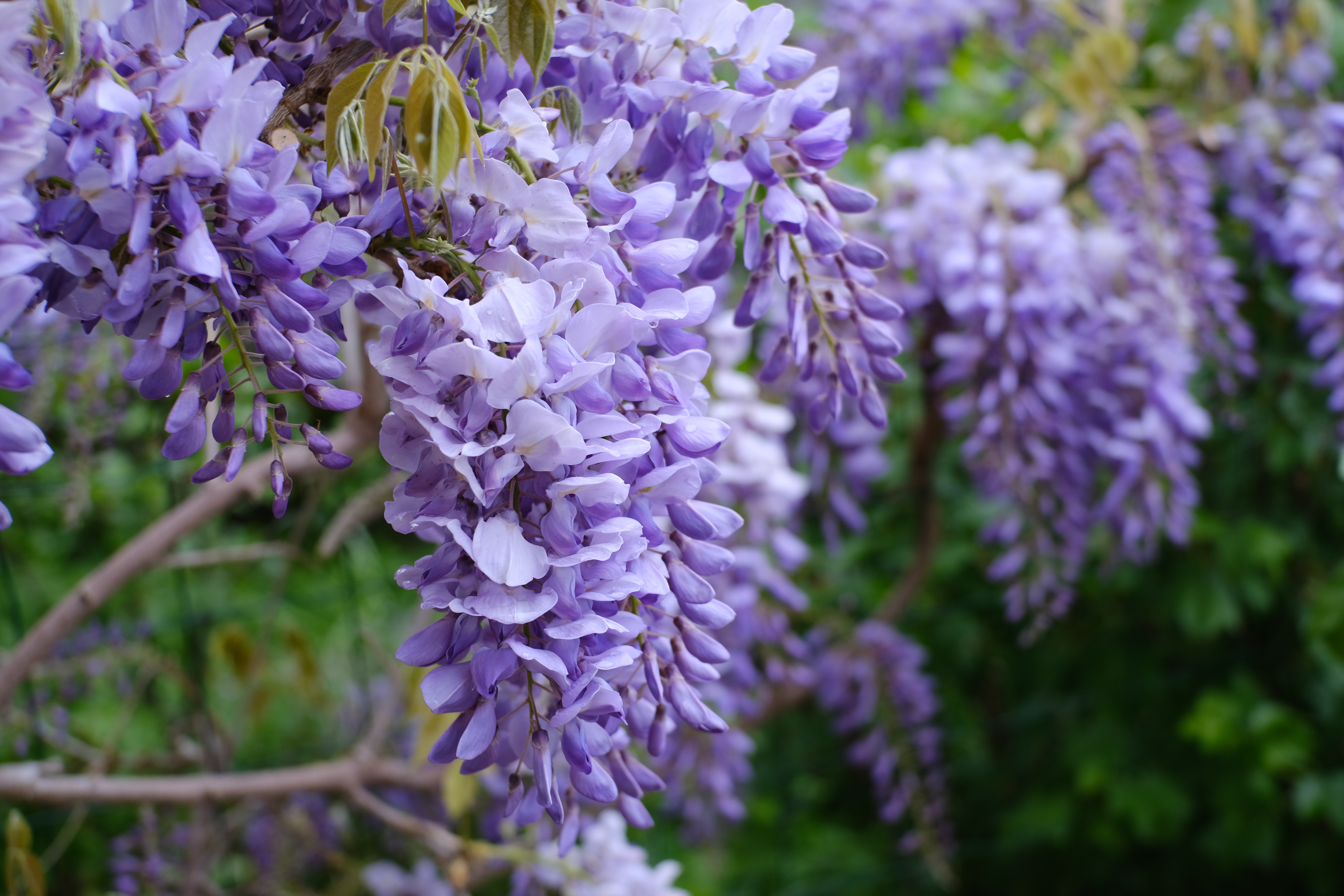
Fleur de Glycine, or Wisteria

==== Development of automatic watches ====
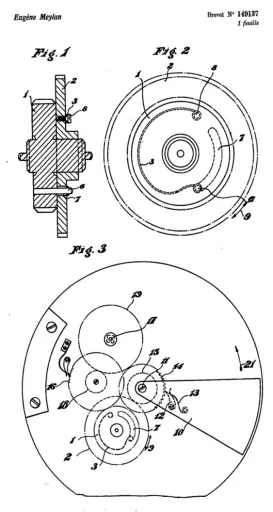
Illustration attached to Meylan's automatic module patent

With the original patent for self-winding watches set to expire in the early 1930s, Meylan (founder of Glycine but no longer affiliated with the company) began working on his own self-winding mechanism and formed the company Automatic E.M.S.A. (Eugène Meylan Société Anonyme). Meylan's automatic watch design was unusual: a separate module that could be used with nearly any 8.75 ligne (19.74 millimeter) watch movement. Meylan applied for a series of patents for his design in 1930. Later that year in October, Glycine, in collaboration with Meylan's new company, manufactured the first mass-produced automatic watches, allowing it to survive the global depression in the 1930s, that caused many Swiss watchmakers to close shop.

=== 1941–1960 ===
In 1942, Glycine's in-house movement was acquired by ASUAG, an entity created by the Swiss government during the Great Depression to preserve Swiss watchmaking. (In the 1980s, through a series of mergers, ASUAG became part of The Swatch Group, a Swiss conglomerate consisting of numerous watchmakers, including Omega, Longines, and Hamilton.) ASUAG's funding combined with Glycine's craftsmen allowed ASUAG to produce the first bi-directional winding rotor. Also in 1942, Glycine owner Ferdinand Engel died, and the company was turned over to Charles Hertig of the Altus Watch Company. (Altus and Glycine merged in 1963.) During World War II, Glycine received an order for watches from the German army for its land forces; Glycine complied, and its watches were issued to German soldiers.

==== Vacuum-sealed case ====
In 1959, Hans Ulrich Klingenberg, working for Glycine, developed the vacuum-sealed watch case. His design featured a one-piece case with a flat crystal, held against a thick gasket ring by bezel clamps, and an oversized crown with three round gaskets. This provided an airless environment inside the watch, preventing lubrication from drying out and preventing condensation from entering the case, allowing for more durable watches and less service requirements. A separate device was included to allow the vacuum seal to be re-established every three to five years. The patent for vacuum casing (CH 355742) was applied in 1959 and issued in 1961.

"In a Vacuum: A watch that never needs cleaning or lubrication and is permanently air-, water-, dust-, and corrosion-proof has been developed by Glycine Watch Factory, Inc., of Bienne, Switzerland. The watch’s precision movement operates in a near vacuum, sealed within a metal case and crystal from which the air has been removed."

— Newsweek, 1961

==== The Airman ====
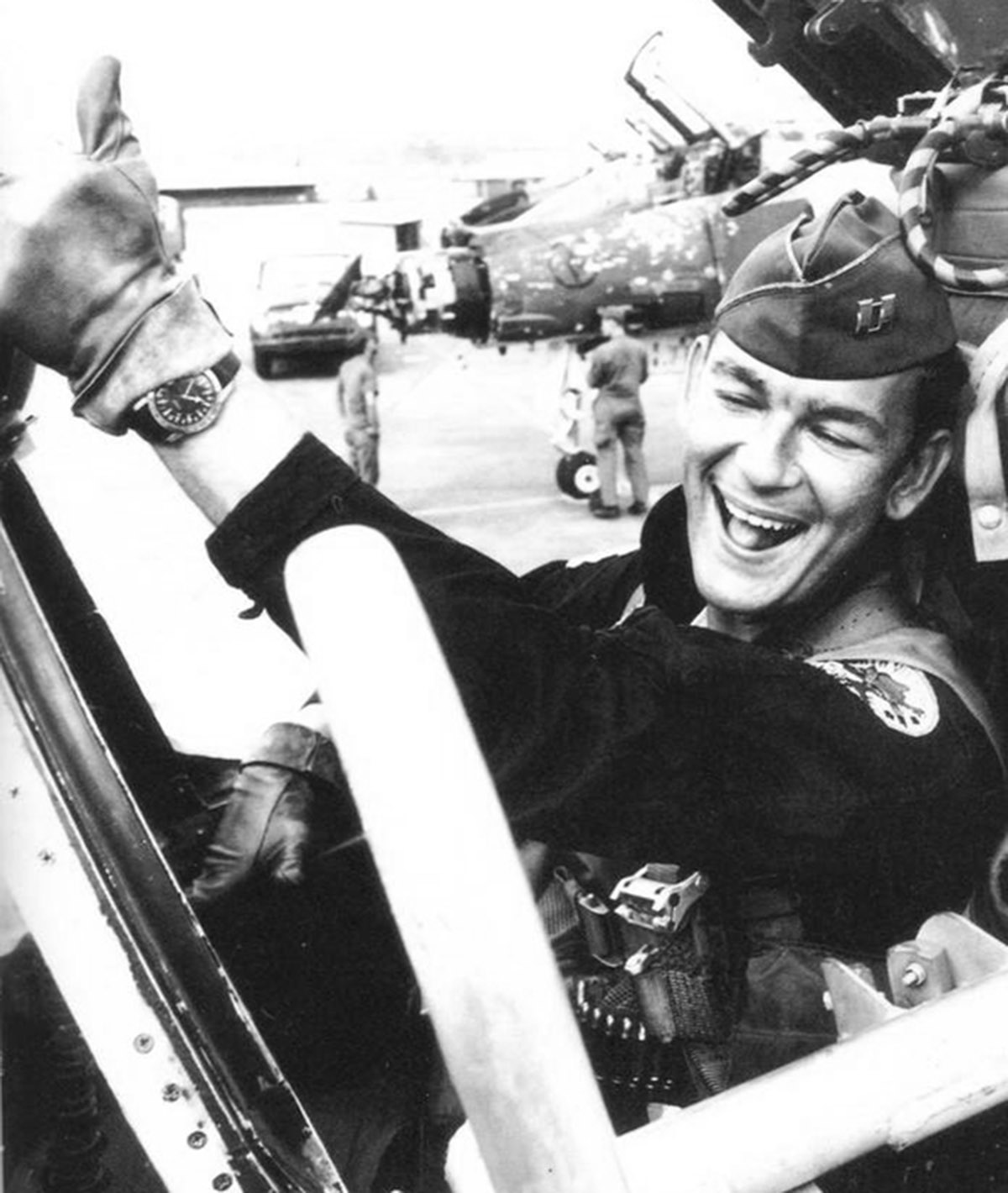
U.S. Air Force pilot during the Vietnam War wearing a Glycine Airman

The Airman debuted in 1953 and was designed by Glycine with full consultation from the U.S. Air Force and made available at exchange stores on military bases. Its design allowed servicemen to simultaneously know the time at home and the local time while in combat. The Airman featured a date function, as well as a 24-hour dial and engraved, rotating 24-hour bezel with locking mechanism that allowed capability to tell time in two different time zones. Shortly after its military success, the Airman obtained civilian success with the emergence of commercial intercontinental flights, as jet-setters sought a watch able to simultaneously tell home time and destination time.

=== 1961–1980 ===
==== Murder of Glycine founder ====
On September 24, 1955, the body of Glycine founder Eugène Meylan, age 64, was found stoned to death in a remote path east of Neuchâtel, Switzerland. Leading up to his death, Meylan was bankrupt and left his Geneva home for Neuchâtel for unknown reasons. Edouard Glatz, a mechanic apprentice, confessed to killing Meylan. Glatz claimed he drank a pint of wine at an establishment with Meylan and accompanied Meylan to a train station, where Meylan planned to take the first train to Zürich. According to Glatz, the station had not yet opened and the pair took off on an obscure path to wait. Glatz admitted he punched Meylan to the ground, kicked him in the head, stoned him to death, and robbed him. In January 1956, Glatz was found guilty of murder and sentenced to five months in prison.

==== Gemini spaceflights and Boeing ====
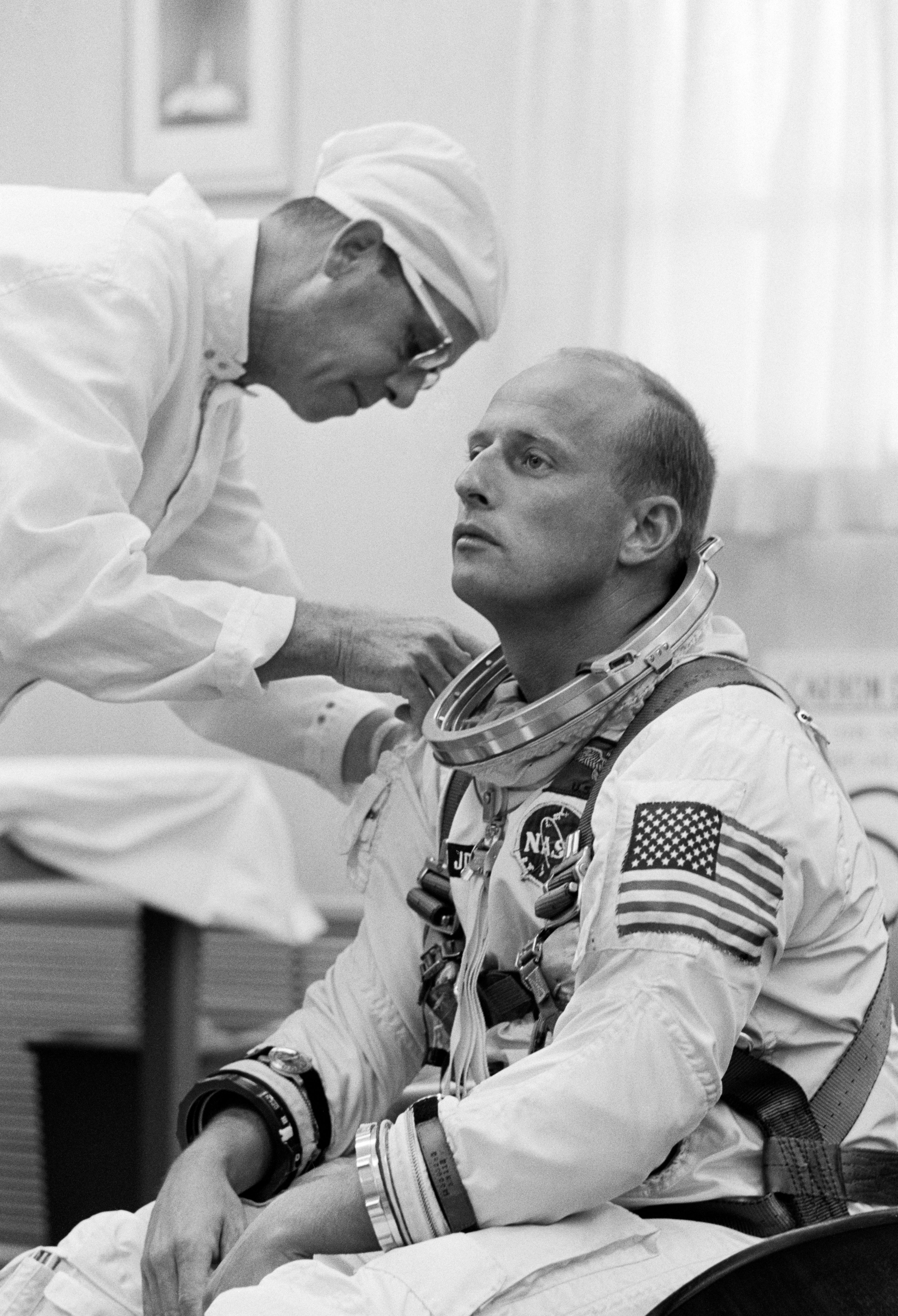
Conrad suiting up for Gemini 11 with an Airman on his right arm

Astronaut Pete Conrad wore his Glycine Airman for the 1965 Gemini 5 spaceflight and again in 1966 for Gemini 11. The capsule used in the Gemini 11 spaceflight featured an open-cockpit design, exposing Conrad and his wrist to outer space during his colleague's 2 hour and 41 minute spacewalk, making Conrad's Airman the first automatic watch flown in and exposed to outer space.

Through a relationship with Boeing, Glycine introduced the Airman SST in 1967, inspired by supersonic transport aircraft. It featured a tonneau-shaped case, orange dial, and internal rotating bezel. Due to their orange dials, the watches are referred to as pumpkins by some collectors.

==== The quartz crisis ====
During the 1970s, many Swiss watchmakers struggled with the emergence of battery-operated quartz watches, which were more affordable and accurate than mechanical watches. During the quartz crisis, many Swiss watchmakers eventually disappeared, became bankrupt, or were sold off to conglomerates. Glycine adapted by debuting its own quartz watches, including digital models with LED screens. Glycine's LED watches were made possible through Ditronic, a collaboration with four other Swiss watchmakers, formed in an effort to stay afloat during the quartz crisis.

=== 1981–present: New ownership ===
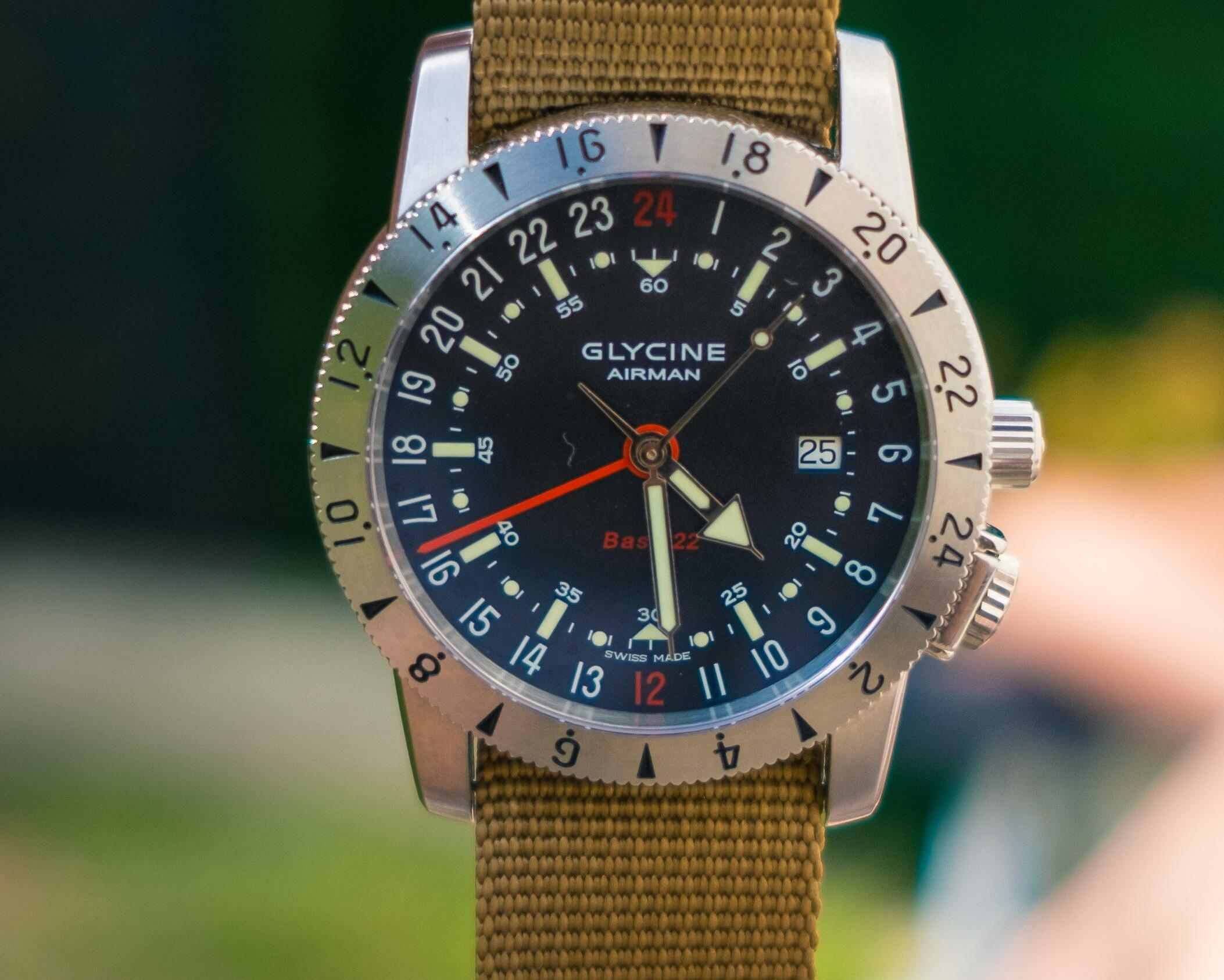
Airman Base 22 (ref. GL0208)

In 1984, Hans Brechbühler, a businessman in the watch industry, purchased Glycine. Brechbühler's youngest daughter Katharina joined Glycine in 1992. Four years later, Glycine launched its first website. In 2000, the father-and-daughter duo released the Airman 7; designed specifically for pilots in the United States with its "coast to coast" concept, it was the first watch available with four time zones (for the four time zones of the contiguous United States). Katharina assumed sole control of Glycine in 2005 with a goal to deprioritize quartz and focus largely on mechanical offerings. After Hans Brechbühler died in 2010, Katharina sold Glycine to Altus Uhren Holding AG; Katharina remained with the company to supervise design. Under Altus, Glycine re-released the Airman in its original 36 millimeter case size as the Airman No. 1 and released a 60th anniversary Airman AM/PM model.

“I joined at the height of the quartz crisis and it became our goal to strip everything back to the beginning, to the mechanical."

— Katharina Brechbühler, former owner of Glycine

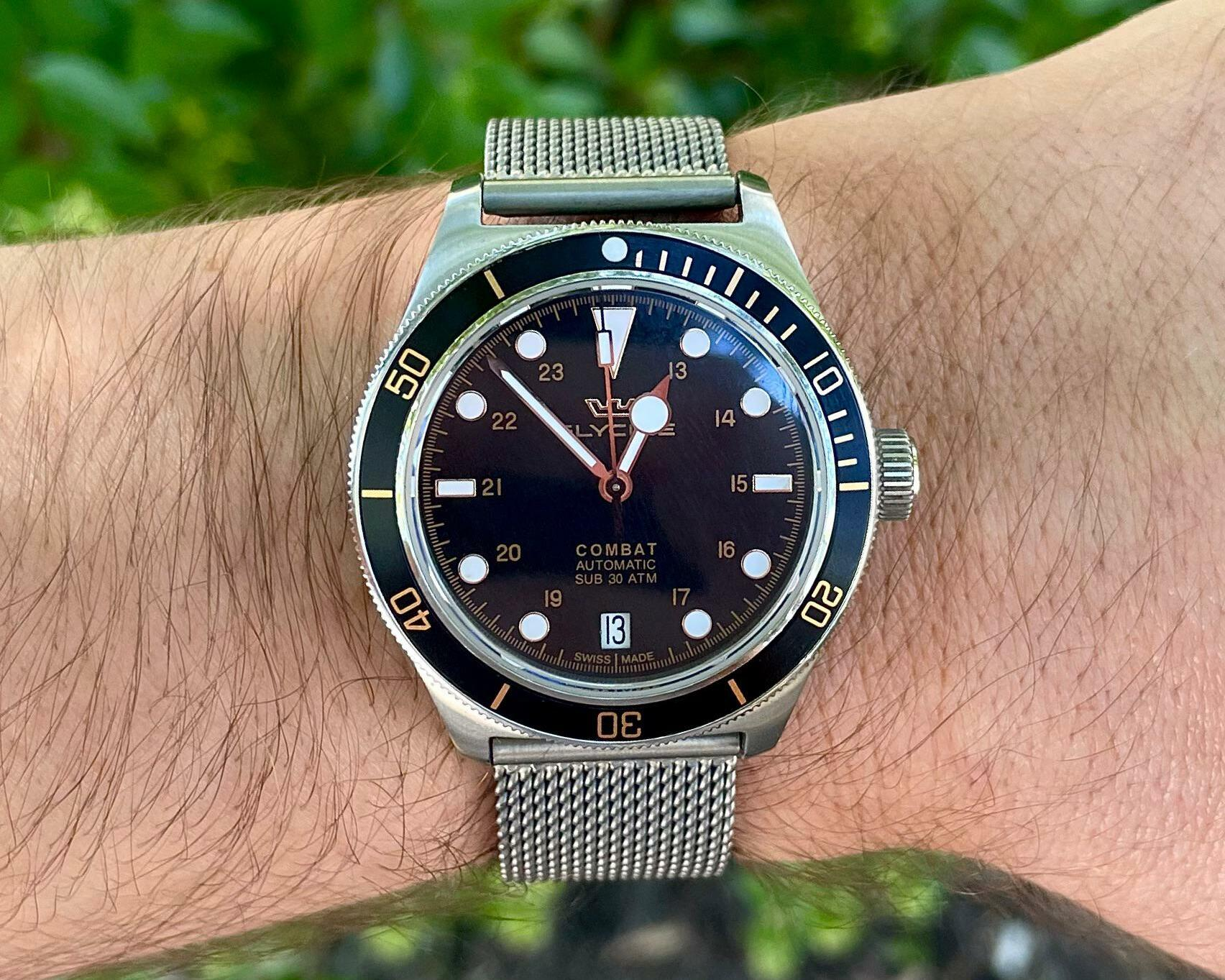
A 36-millimeter variant of the Combat Sub (ref. GL0396)

In 2016, Invicta Watch Group purchased Glycine for an undisclosed amount, with Invicta promising Glycine will maintain its independence while Invicta assists with marketing and distribution. Leadership remained the same under Invicta as it did under Altus until 2019, when Invicta appointed Daniele Andreatta as Glycine's managing director.

=== Patents ===
- 1917: Glycine's first patent—a wristwatch strap buckle clasp
- 1929: Patent for small, pill-shaped watch module that could fit into various cases
- 1930: Patent for a watch with window to display the date
- 1930: Eugène Meylan's patent for automatic modules for watches (not Glycine's, but Meylan's personal patent, used in Glycine's first automatic watches)
- 1931: Patent for a fold-out lever crown to set the time
- 1953: Patent for a 24-hour watch, used for the Airman
- 1955: Patent for a seconds hacking mechanism, invented by Georges Godat, and purchased by Glycine for its use in the Airman and Combat
- 1959: Glycine's patent for vacuum-sealed watch cases
- 1970: Glycine's final patent—a crown allowing the operator to regulate time

== Logo controversy ==
In its early years, Glycine used a logo with two flags and "LG" initials for La Glycine. In the 1940s it switched to a crest logo. In 1965, the company debuted its crown logo.

Glycine added wings to the crown logo in 2025, to reference its historical ties to aviation. This sparked a lawsuit from Giorgio Armani in 2017, claiming it was confusingly similar to its eagle logo. The Commercial Court of Bern ruled in favor of Armani; however, Glycine successfully appealed the decision. In 2019, the Federal Supreme Court of Switzerland overturned the Bern court's decision, allowing Glycine to use its new logo; despite this, Glycine returned to its original crown logo without wings later that year.

Comparison of logos

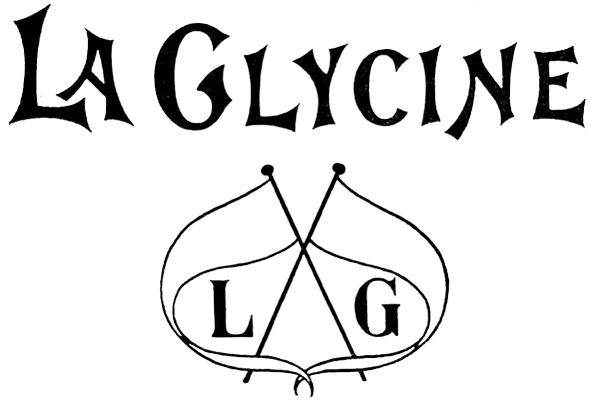
Logo used until 1930

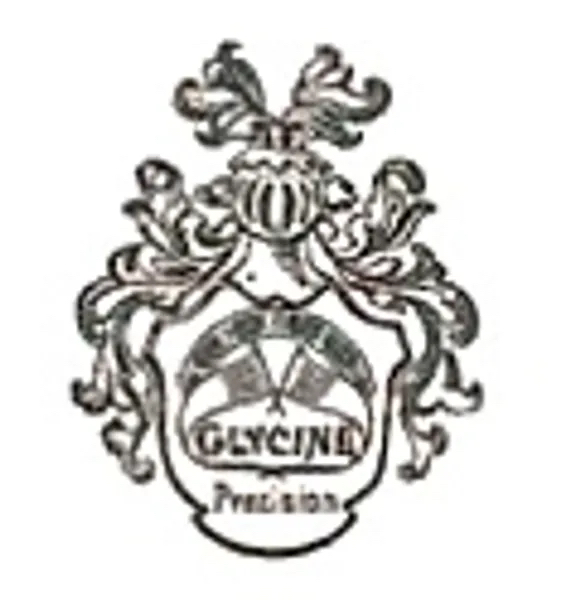
1940s logo

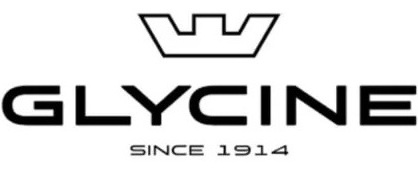
Current logo, debuted in 1965

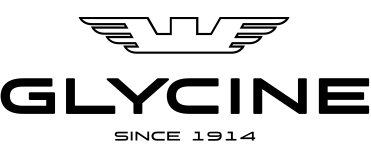
Crown with wings; used briefly, sparking lawsuit from Armani

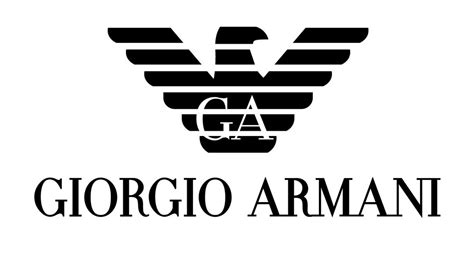
Giorgio Armani logo
