= Höja, Malmö =

Höja
- Neighbourhood
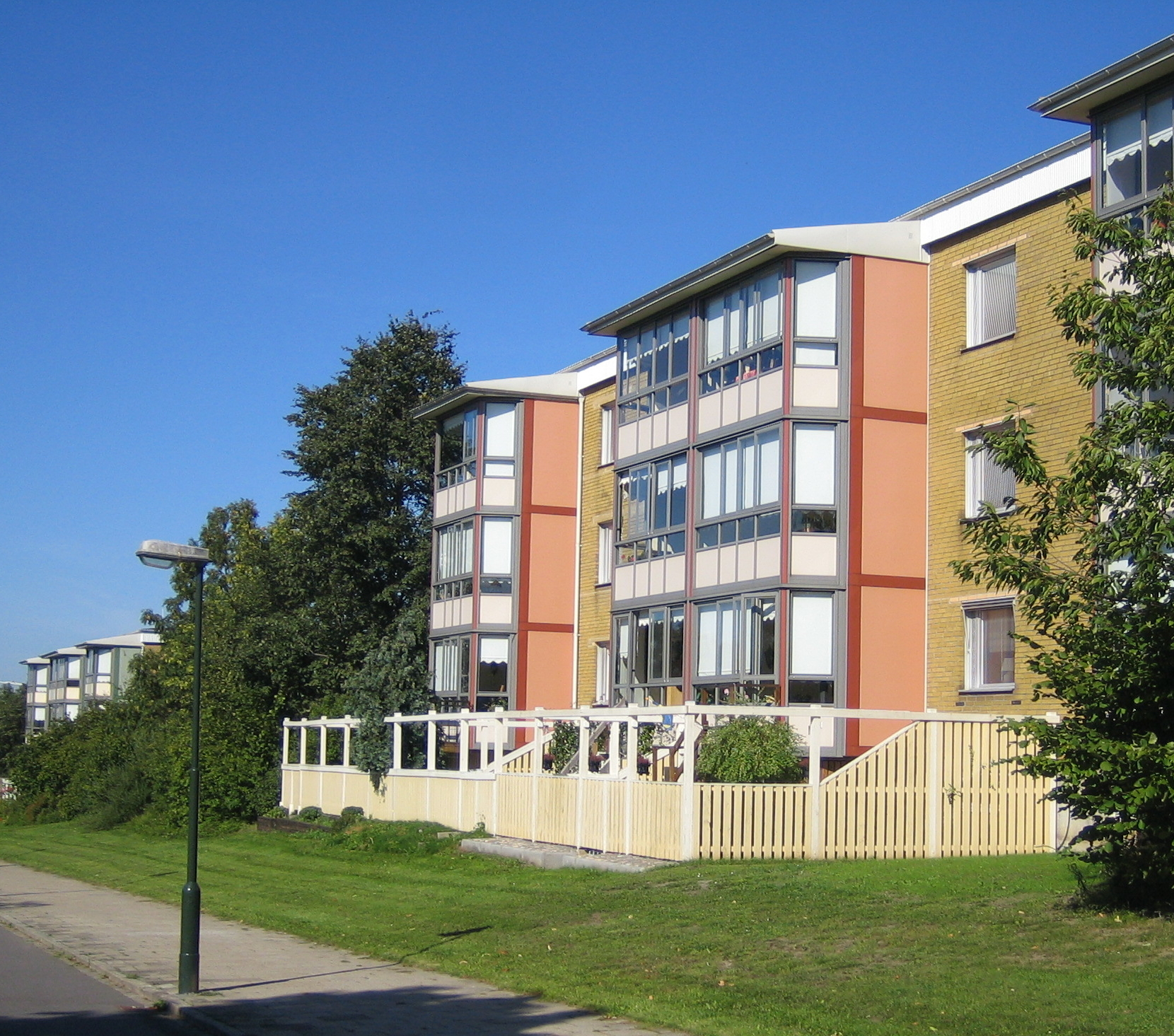
- Interactive map of Höja
- Coordinates: 55.584°N 13.062°E
- Country: Sweden
- Province: Skåne
- County: Skåne County
- Municipality: Malmö Municipality
- Borough of Malmö: Husie

Population (1 January 2008)
  - Total: 1,945
- Time zone: UTC+1 (CET)
  - Summer (DST): UTC+2 (CEST)

Höja is a neighbourhood of Malmö, situated in the Borough of Husie, Malmö Municipality, Skåne County, Sweden.
