= Hauer =

Hauer is a surname, and may refer to:

- Brett Hauer (born 1971), American ice hockey player
- Elena Hauer (born 1986), German footballer
- Erwin Hauer (1926-2017), Austrian-born American sculptor
- Franz Ritter von Hauer (1822–1899), Austrian geologist
- Jakob Wilhelm Hauer (1881–1962), founder of the German Faith Movement
- Jerome Hauer, American politician and businessman
- Joachim Hauer (born 1991), Norwegian ski jumper
- Josef Matthias Hauer (1883–1959), Austrian composer and music theorist
- Karen Hauer (born 1982), Venezuelan dancer
- Matthias Hauer (born 1977), German politician
- Moshe Hauer (d. 2025), American rabbi
- Rutger Hauer (1944–2019), Dutch actor
- Torodd Hauer (1922–2010), Norwegian speed skater

== See also ==
- Hauer, Wisconsin, unincorporated community
- Hower, surname
