= Jim Hower =

Australian rules footballer

Personal information
- Full name: Jim Hower
- Born: 3 September 1931
- Died: 16 June 2008 (aged 76)
- Original team: Morwell
- Height: 182 cm (6 ft 0 in)
- Weight: 82 kg (181 lb)
- Position: Forward

Playing career^{1}
Years	Club	Games (Goals)
1954–55	Collingwood	14 (12)
- ^{1} Playing statistics correct to the end of 1955.

Jim Hower (3 September 1931 – 16 June 2008) was an Australian rules footballer who played with the Collingwood in the Victorian Football League (VFL).
