= Walter Heuer (proofreader) =

Swiss author (1908–1977)

Walter Heuer (25 October 1908 in Aegerten, canton of Bern, 7 September 1977 in Küsnacht, canton of Zurich) was Chefkorrektor (head proofreader) at the Neue Zürcher Zeitung and author of the book Richtiges Deutsch. He was a central figure in the area of German orthography, especially in the German-speaking part of Switzerland.

== Life ==
Walter Heuer was born on 25 October 1908 in Aegerten, a small town in the Seeland region in the Swiss canton of Bern. After an apprenticeship as typesetter in the city of Biel from 1924 to 1928, he worked at the newspaper Luzerner Tagblatt (now Neue Luzerner Zeitung). Heuer later was proofreader (Note: In Switzerland: Korrektor. This profession is roughly a combination of proofreading and copy editing with focus on spelling, grammar and punctuation.) at the printing house Druckerei Friedrich Reinhardt in Basel, a common career step for typesetters. In 1939, he became head proofreader at the book printer Buchdruckerei Büchler & Co AG in Bern.

He also taught Fachdeutsch, technical German, for typesetters at the Gewerbeschule (more or less equivalent to a trade school) in Bern, was course instructor for language training courses for assistants and supervised as Experte (examiner) the final apprenticeship examinations. He co-founded the Swiss proofreader's course, a (now) correspondence course for proofreaders as preparation for the Federal Professional Examination and finally the Federal VET Diploma.

On 1 August 1950, Heuer became Gottlieb Lehner’s successor as head proofreader at the prestigious Swiss newspaper Neue Zürcher Zeitung (NZZ). He developed the existing proofreader’s course, and under his leadership, the course achieved the quality it is still famous for today.

Walter Heuer retired end of 1973 and died in 1977.

== Books ==
In 1960, two books edited by Heuer were published: Sprachschule für Setzer und Korrektoren, a textbook on grammar and orthography for the proofreader’s course, and Richtiges Deutsch – eine Sprachschule für jedermann, which was basically a special edition of Sprachschule adapted for the public. This book quickly became a huge success outside the typesetting trade, and it was soon used as a schoolbook at schools of secondary and upper secondary education (vocational schools and Gymnasiums). Heuer’s Vademecum, a style guide originally published in 1971 for internal use for redactors and correspondents of the NZZ, was later also made available to a greater audience.

Richtiges Deutsch is still published, 2021 in its 33rd edition, edited and updated by NZZ’s former head proofreaders Max Flückiger and Peter Gallmann, while the Vademecum was published in 2014 in its 14th edition by former NZZ head proofreader Stephan Dové.

Heuer wrote a satirical language column in the NZZ. The articles were also published in book form.

== Significance ==
Heuer had a great influence over the principles of teaching German grammar through his popular book Richtiges Deutsch.

He took clear positions on questions regarding German orthography and orthographic reforms. Although he was against substantial changes, he didn’t reject reforms in general and criticised the overly strict rules of the Duden, the dictionary for High Standard German. He emphasised that the main function of punctuation marks, especially the comma, was to facilitate reading and that readability was the first principle of orthography, so rules shouldn’t be simplified thoughtlessly.

His positions on specific rules or discussions on rules were:

- Nouns have to be capitalised. This against the attempts to install the so-called gemässigte Kleinschreibung (moderate lower-case spelling). This would allow German nouns, which are usually with an upper-case letter at the beginning, to be written in lower case like in English, for example kindergarten instead of Kindergarten.
- Against the rule of thumb "when in doubt, lower case" (Im Zweifel klein). This rule might be applied in several (oftentimes complicated) cases when in doubt whether a word is capitalised or not, for example außer acht / außer Acht.
- Indicators of vowel length should be kept. The vowel length in German is indicated by several means (for example silent -h- in Bahn or double vowel in Saal).
- The ß (a sharp -s- sound, called sharp s, long s or Eszett) should stay and the Heyse’sche Regelung (Heyse’s rule) be applied. This rule states that ß is used after long vowels and diphthongs (e. g. -au-, like in außer), otherwise -ss-. ß is used in Germany and Austria but in general not in Switzerland.
- Words shouldn’t be written as compounds if the meaning is the same as when written separately. This applies mostly to combinations of adjective plus verb and adverb plus verb (zusammenarbeiten vs. zusammen arbeiten).
- The so-called "three-letter rule" should be implemented on consonants as well as vowels. This rule states that, when three of the same vowels meet (which can be the case in compound words), the compound noun is hyphenated (Tee-Ei). For consonants, this would for example mean writing Schiff-Fahrt instead of Schifffahrt.
- Heuer objected the forced Germanisation of loanwords as had happened for example with cescendo – Krescendo. Some of these words are now again written in their "original" form.

On the aspect of hyphenation rules at the end of a line, Heuer proposed that

- it should be allowed to separate s from t (Indus-trie),
- ck should stay together instead of being separated in k-k (kna-cken instead of knak-ken),
- hyphenation should be possible according to syllables, not only according to etymology or morphology (Inte-resse as well as Inter-esse).

Those propositions were adopted 19 years after Heuer’s death in the 1996 German orthography reform. (Note: The extensive reform sparked a heated debate. Ten years later, in 2006, the more controversial changes were removed. However, the changes Heuer had taken position on remained.)

The orthography reform of 1996 also integrated words whose orthography in the NZZ, set by Heuer, differed from the Duden, such as überschwänglich instead of überschwenglich or Albtraum instead of Alptraum.

== List of books by Walter Heuer ==
- Richtiges Deutsch. Vollständige Grammatik und Rechtschreiblehre. 33. Auflage. Verlag Neue Zürcher Zeitung, Zürich 2021, bearb. von Max Flückiger, Peter Gallmann, ISBN 978-3-907291-30-6. (1st edition: Richtiges Deutsch – Eine Sprachschule für jedermann (Sonderausgabe der «Sprachschule für Setzer und Korrektoren»). Buchverlag der Neuen Zürcher Zeitung, Zürich 1960).
- Vademecum – Der sprachlich-technische Leitfaden der «Neuen Zürcher Zeitung». 14. Auflage. Verlag Neue Zürcher Zeitung, Zürich 2014, ISBN 978-3-03823-903-1. (1st edition: Sprachlich-technisches Vademecum für unsere Redaktoren, Korrespondenten und Mitarbeiter. Neue Zürcher Zeitung, Zürich 1971).
- Sprachschule für Setzer und Korrektoren. Buchverlag der Neuen Zürcher Zeitung, Zürich 1960.
- Deutsch unter der Lupe. Buchverlag der Neuen Zürcher Zeitung, Zürich 1972.
- Darf man so sagen? Buchverlag der Neuen Zürcher Zeitung, Zürich 1976.

== See also ==
- vocational education in Switzerland
- apprenticeship in Switzerland
