= Diving watch =

Watch designed for underwater diving

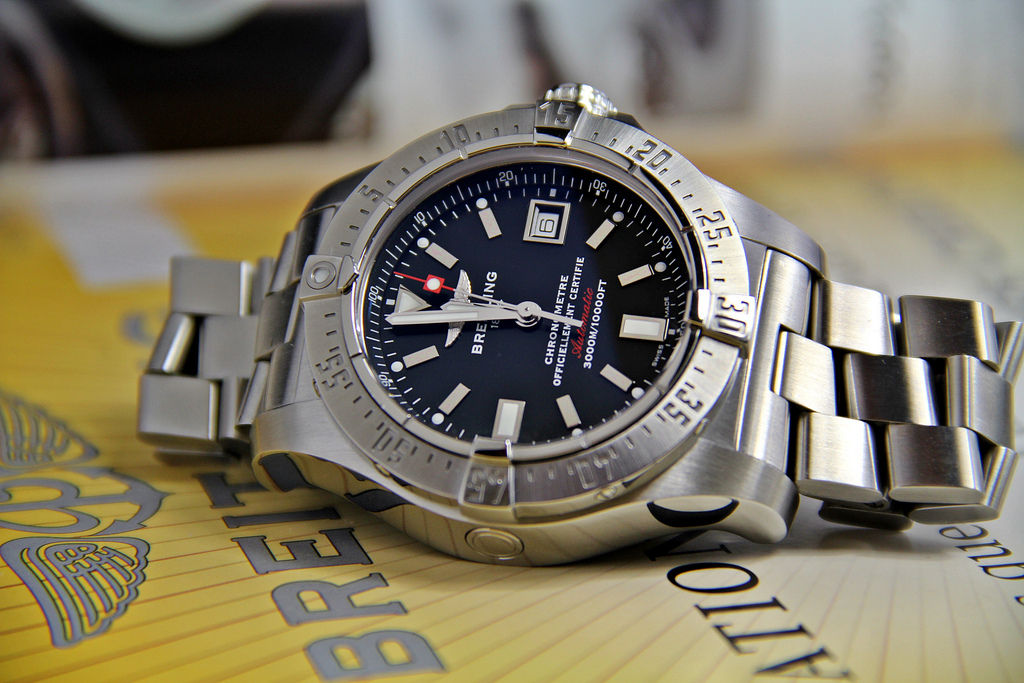
- Breitling Avenger Seawolf, with a water resistance of 3,000 m (10,000 ft). The round feature on the watch case side at 9 o'clock is an integrated helium release valve.
- Uses: Monitoring dive time by the diver

A diving watch, also commonly referred to as a diver's or dive watch, is a watch designed for underwater diving that features, as a minimum, a water resistance greater than 1.1 MPa (11 atm), the equivalent of 100 m (330 ft). The typical diver's watch will have a water resistance of around 200 to 300 m (660 to 980 ft), though modern technology allows the creation of diving watches that can go much deeper. A true contemporary diver's watch is in accordance with the ISO 6425 standard, which defines test standards and features for watches suitable for diving with underwater breathing apparatus in depths of 100 m (330 ft) or more. Watches conforming to ISO 6425 are marked with the word DIVER'S to distinguish ISO 6425 conformant diving watches from watches that might not be suitable for actual scuba diving.

To a large extent the diver's watch has been superseded by the personal dive computer, which provides an automatically initiated dive timer function along with real-time decompression computation and other optional functions.

== History ==
The history of efforts to use watches underwater and to make watches that are water resistant, or waterproof and to make dive watches goes back to perhaps the 17th century. In the 19th century water and dust resistant watches were usually one-off pieces custom made for a particular customer and described as "Explorer's Watches". Hard hat divers of that period sometimes placed common pocketwatches on the inside of their helmets in order to know the time spent under water. Early in the 20th century such watches were industrially produced for military and commercial distribution. Like their predecessors early 20th century dive watches were developed in response to meet the needs of several different but related groups: explorers, navies, and professional divers.

In 1926, Rolex bought the patent for the “Oyster” watch case, featuring a hermetic seal. On 7 October 1927 an English swimmer, Mercedes Gleitze attempted to cross the English Channel with a new Rolex Oyster hanging round her neck by a ribbon on this swim. After more than 10 hours in the chilly water the watch remained sealed and kept good time throughout.

Omega SA is credited as the creator of the world's first industrially produced diving watch intended for commercial distribution, the rectangular Omega "Marine" with a patented double sliding and removable case, introduced in 1932. After a series of trials undertaken by the Swiss Laboratory for Horology in Neuchâtel in May 1937, the watch was certified as being able to withstand a pressure of 1.37 MPa (13.5 atm), equivalent to a depth of 135 m (443 ft), without any water intake whatsoever.

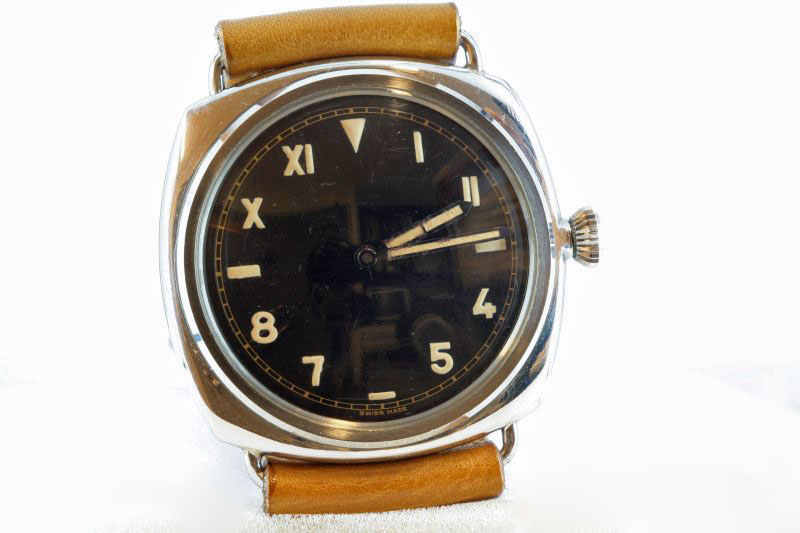
The vintage 1936 California Dial Radiomir Panerai

Following a request made by the Royal Italian Navy, in September 1935, for a luminous underwater watch for divers, Panerai offered "Radiomir" underwater timepieces in 1936. These watches were made by Rolex for Panerai.

In addition, a large number of "canteen" style dive watches by Hamilton, Elgin or Waltham were made to military specification during and after World War II. However, these watches were made in small numbers, and were not intended for large-scale commercial distribution. Today, interest in these watches is limited to collectors.

Various models were issued by Blancpain in small quantities to the military in several countries, including US and French Navy combat diver teams. The Fifty Fathoms was worn by Jacques Cousteau and his divers during the underwater film "Le monde du silence", which won the Palme d'Or at the Cannes film festival in 1956, and in the US when TV star Lloyd Bridges wore a Blancpain Fifty Fathoms dive watch in a photo that appeared on the cover of the February 1962 edition of Skin Diver Magazine.

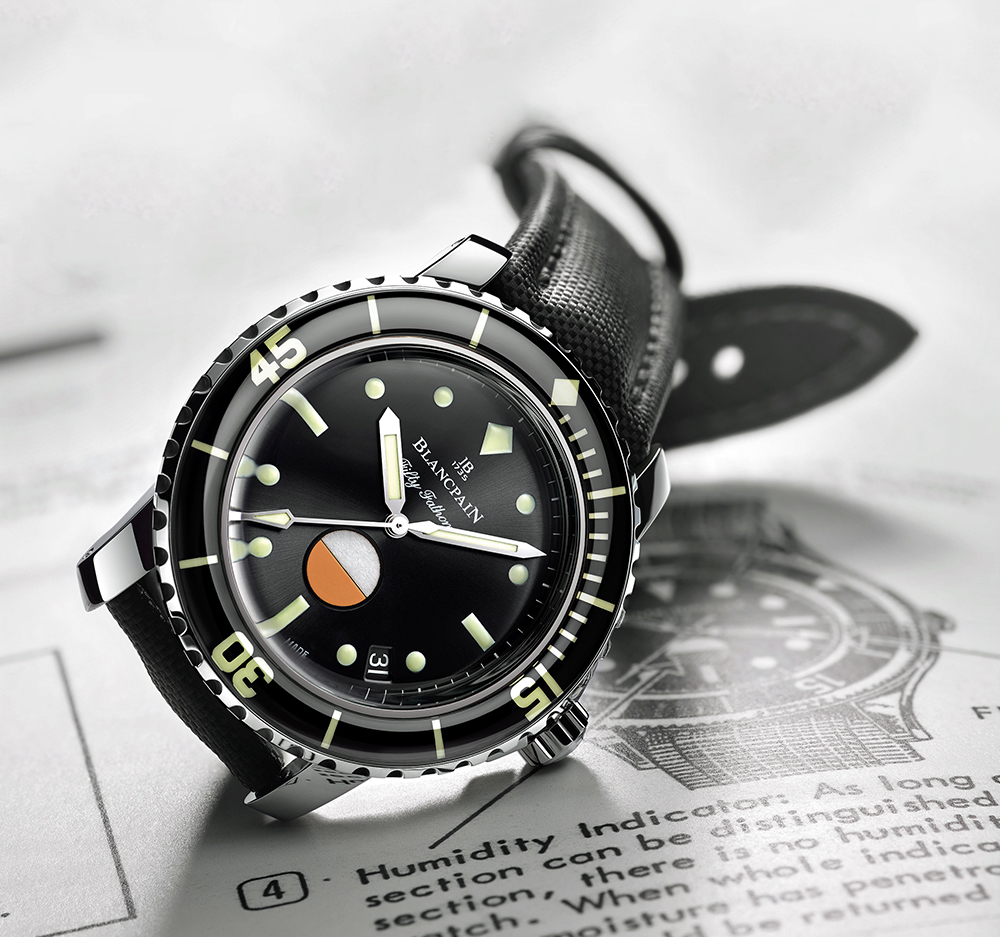
The Blancpain Fifty Fathoms model family was introduced in the mid 1950s

Zodiac debuted their Sea Wolf line of waterproof watches at the 1953 Basel Fair as well.

The Rolex Submariner, the first modern dive watch, was introduced at the Basel Watch Fair in 1954. This coincided with the development of self-contained underwater breathing apparatus, known as scuba. In 1959, the United States Navy Experimental Diving Unit evaluated five diving watches that included the Bulova US Navy Submersible Wrist Watch, Enicar Sherpa Diver 600, Enicar Seapearl 600, Blancpain Fifty Fathoms, and the Rolex Oyster Perpetual.

In 1961, Edox launched the Delfin line of watches, with industry-first double case backs for water resistance to 200 meters. They later released the Hydrosub line in 1963 featuring the first crown system with tension ring allowing depths of 500 meters.

In 1961, Rolex began to include a skindiver handbook with the Submariner, then available in two models, one water resistant to 200 m (660 ft), the other, less expensive version, to 100 m (330 ft). It was the choice of watch for the character of 007 in the first ten James Bond films, causing the "Sub" to achieve an iconic status.

In 1964, Zuccolo Rochet & Cie issued the Grands Fonds 300 to Explosive Ordnance Disposal (EOD) units using a mechanical operation as electric interference could trigger off explosions. It used an easy clean system that allows freshwater to free up residue between the watch case/bezel. Another notable function is the crown placed in the lower watchstrap to prevent snagging on objects during underwater operations.

The Tornek-Rayville TR-900 issued to the US Navy used tritium, later promethium on the dials and a moisture intrusion indicator, which changed color if water penetrated the watchcase. However, only 1000 existed as most of these watches were destroyed by the Navy upon their return due to strict hazardous waste disposal rules for equipment containing radioactive material.

In 1965, Seiko put the 62MAS on the market, the first Japanese professional diver watch.

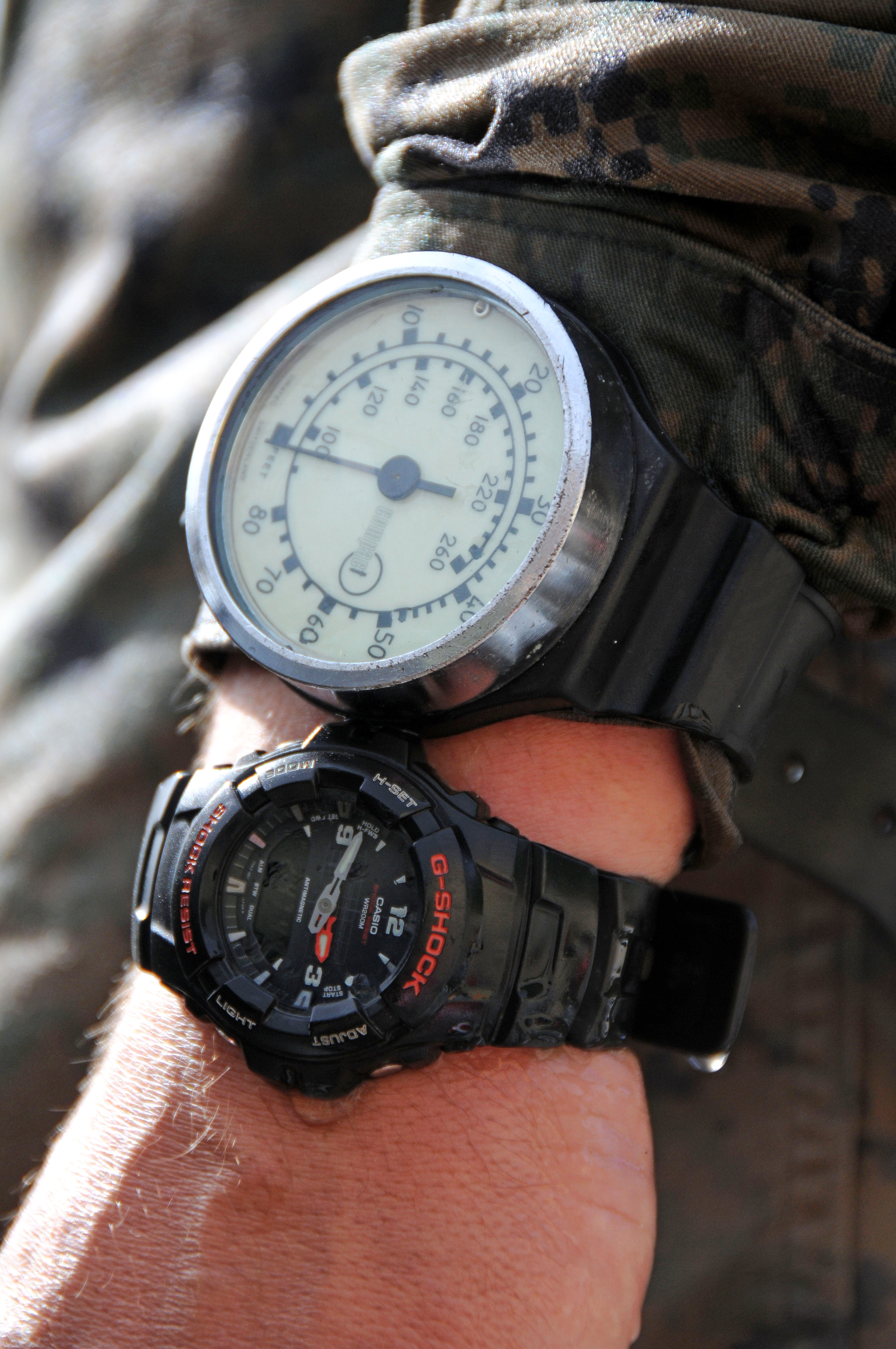
US Marine diver with a diving watch and an analog depth gauge

During the 1960s, commercial work in the oceans and seas created professional diving organisations that needed more robust watches designed for diving operations at greater depths. This led to the development of the first 'ultra water resistant' watches like the Rolex Sea-Dweller 2000 (2000 ft = 610 m), that became available in 1967, and was produced in several variations, and the Omega Seamaster Professional 600m/2000 ft, also known as the "Omega PloProf" (Plongeur Professionnel), that became available in 1970, and was produced in several variations.

In 1983, the US Navy Experimental Diving Unit evaluated several digital watches for use by US Navy divers.

In 1996, the International Organization for Standardization (ISO) introduced the standards and features for diving watches regulated by the ISO 6425 – Divers' watches international standard.

Many contemporary sports watches owe their design to diving watches.

The vast majority of divers now use electronic, wrist-worn dive computers. A dive computer or decompression meter is a device used by a scuba diver to measure the time and depth of a dive so that a safe ascent profile can be calculated and displayed so that the diver can avoid decompression sickness. Diving watches and depth gauges are still fairly commonly used by divers as backup instruments in case of dive computer malfunctions, although it is becoming more common to carry a backup dive computer with full decompression functionality for dives with significant planned decompression, as it is a safer option.

== Characteristics ==
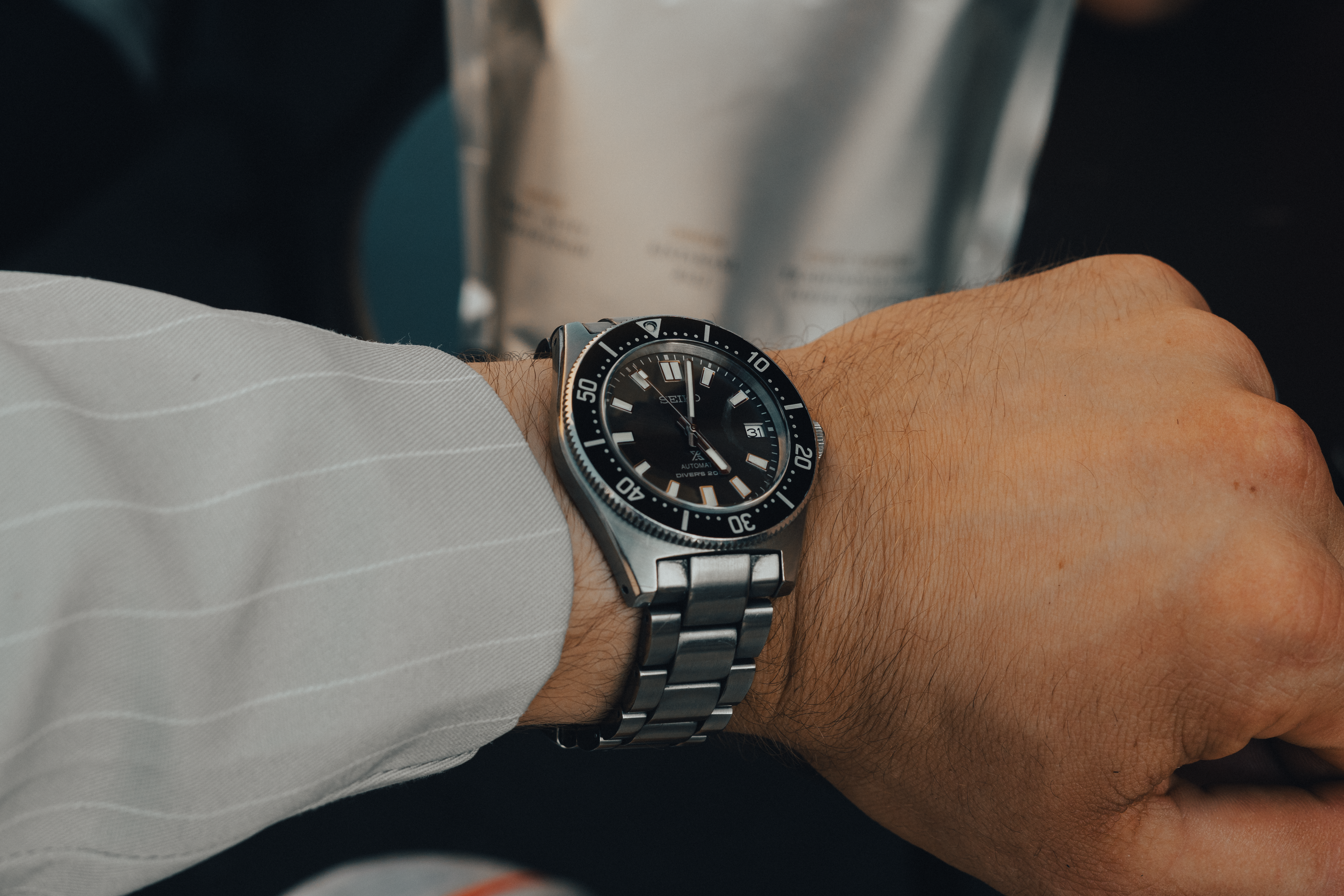
Seiko Prospex SPB143J1 – a professional diving watch with 200-meter water resistance.

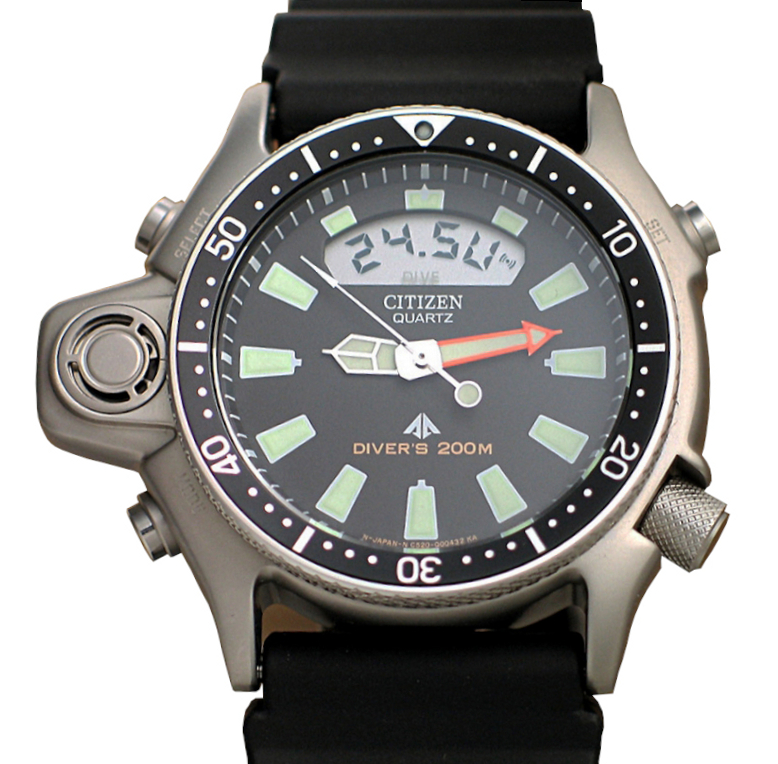
Citizen Promaster Aqualand digital/analog JP2000-08E Diver's 200 m

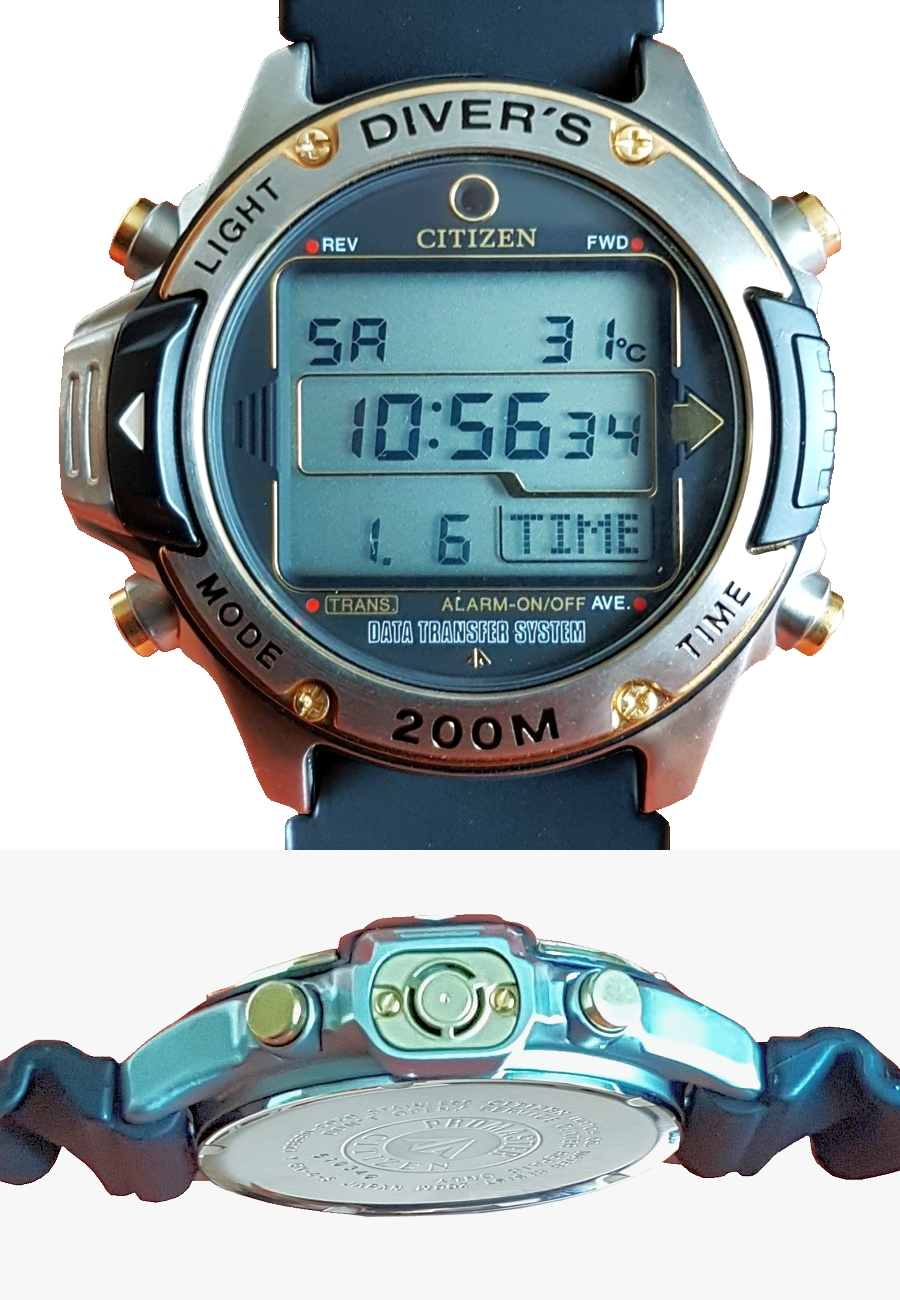
Citizen Hyper Aqualand ProMaster MA9024-21E digital Diver's 200 m

Many companies offer highly functional diving watches. Whilst diving watches are primarily tool watches, some companies offer models that can in addition to this be regarded by some as jewellery or fine mechanical devices. Diving watches can be analog or digital. Besides pure analog and digital models some diving watch models combine digital and analog elements.

=== ISO 6425 standard for diving watches ===
The standards and features for diver's watches are regulated by the International Organization for Standardization in the ISO 6425 standard; German Industrial Norm DIN 8306 is an equivalent standard. Besides water resistance standards to a minimum of 100 m depth rating ISO 6425 also provides minimum requirements for mechanical diver's watches (quartz and digital watches have slightly differing readability requirements) such as:

- Equipped with a diving time indicator (e.g. rotating bezel, digital display, or other). This device shall allow the reading of the diving time with a resolution of 1 min or better over at least 60 min.
- The presence of clearly distinguishable minute markings on the watch face.
- Adequate readability/visibility at 25 cm (9.8 in) in total darkness.
- The presence of an indication that the watch is running in total darkness. This is usually indicated by a running second hand with a luminous tip or tail.
- Magnetic resistance. This is tested by 3 exposures to a direct current magnetic field of 4,800 A/m. The watch must keep its accuracy to ± 30 seconds/day as measured before the test despite the magnetic field.
- Shock resistance. This is tested by two shocks (one on the 9 o'clock side, and one to the crystal and perpendicular to the face). The shock is usually delivered by a hard plastic hammer mounted as a pendulum, so as to deliver a measured amount of energy, specifically, a 3 kg hammer with an impact velocity of 4.43 m/s. The change in rate allowed is ± 60 seconds/day.
- Chemical resistance. This is tested by immersion in a 30 g/L NaCl solution for 24 hours to test its rust resistance. This test water solution has a salinity comparable to normal seawater.
- Strap/band solidity. This is tested by applying a force of 200 N (45 lb_{f}) to each spring bar (or attaching point) in opposite directions with no damage to the watch or attachment point.
- The presence of an End Of Life (EOL) indicator on battery powered watches.

Testing diving watches for ISO 6425 compliance is voluntary and involves costs, so not every manufacturer present their watches for certification according to this standard.

=== Watch case ===
The watch cases of diving watches must be adequately water (pressure) resistant and be able to endure the galvanic corrosiveness of seawater, so the cases are generally made out of materials like grade 316L or 904L austenitic stainless steel and other steel alloys with higher Pitting Resistance Equivalent factors (PRE-factors), titanium, ceramics and synthetic resins or plastics. If metal bracelets are used they should be made of the same metal alloy as the watch case to prevent corrosion of the metal with the lower PRE-factor as it will act as a sacrificial anode. The case must also provide an adequate degree of protection against external magnetic influences and shocks, though diver's watches do not have to be able to endure strong magnetic fields and shocks. To make mechanical watch movements themselves shock resistant various shock protection systems can be used.

The cases of diving watches have to be constructed more stoutly than typical dress watches, because of the requirements necessary to withstand a seawater environment at depth. As a consequence diving watches are relatively heavy and large compared to dress watches made out of similar materials. Under water sheer weight is of less consequence than buoyancy, which a diver can address by a buoyancy compensator ("BC") vest. Before the introduction of other case materials diving watch cases were made of stainless steel. Stainless steel is however still often used as case material in contemporary diving watches.

=== Elapsed time controller ===
Video: Setting the bezel of a diving watch to a dedicated point in time, typically the start time of the dive – one of the most important features of diving watches before dive computers became ubiquitous

Analog diving watches will often feature a rotating bezel, that allows for an easier reading of elapsed time of under one hour from a specific point. This is used to compute the length of a dive. (See Tachymeter.) Upon entering the water, the diver aligns the zero on the bezel with the minute (or sometimes second) hand, allowing the elapsed time to be read from the bezel. This saves the diver having to remember the exact water entry moment and having to perform arithmetic that would be necessary if the watch's regular dial was used. On diving watches the bezel is "unidirectional", i.e., it contains a ratchet so it can only be turned anti-clockwise to "increase" the apparent elapsed time, should the bezel be unintentionally rotated further during the dive. This is an important "fail safe" feature. If the bezel could be turned clockwise, this could suggest to a diver that the elapsed time is shorter than reality, thus indicating a falsely short elapsed time reading, and therefore falsely short saturation period, an assumption that can be highly dangerous. Some diving watch models feature a lockable bezel to minimize the chance of unintentional bezel operation under water.

The exclusive use of a rotating bezel is considered a rudimentary diving technique in the 21st century, suitable for basic, shallow single gas (air) diving only. Non-basic diving profiles and depths past 30 m (98 ft) require other more advanced timing and measuring methods to establish suitable decompression profiles to avoid decompression sickness. Besides for basic diving and as a backup for monitoring time during more complex preplanned diving, the one-way bezel can also be used for other situations in which a measurement of elapsed time of under one hour might be useful, like cooking.

Digital dive watches usually perform the elapsed time function by use of a standard stop watch function. Digital dive watches may also feature a depth gauge and logging features, but are not usually regarded as a substitute for a dedicated dive computer.

==== Bezel markings ====
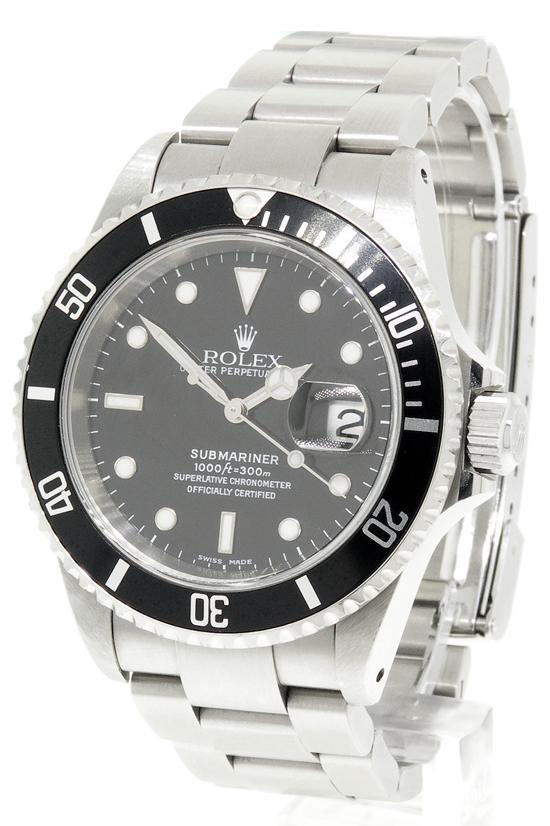
Rolex Submariner model 16610 features a rotating bezel with non-uniform minute markings for the first 15 minutes

Most contemporary dive watches with non-uniform time markings – generally in one minute intervals for the first 15 or 20 minutes – on their bezels are the result of copying old bezel designs. In the past divers typically planned a dive to a certain maximum depth based on now obsolete US Navy dive tables, and dived according to the planned dive profile. If the dive profile allowed a bottom time of 35 minutes the diver, upon entering the water, would set the marker on the bezel, 35 minutes ahead of the minute hand. The diver calculated this with the 60 – bottom time formulae (60 − 35 = 25, for 35 minutes bottom time the diver would align the 25 minute bezel-mark with the minute hand). Once the minute hand reached the main-marker on the bezel the diver would begin his ascent to the surface. The one minute intervals scale helped with timing the ascent and whatever safety stop the diver deemed necessary. For contemporary diving methods the 15 or 20 minute "count-down" bezel is quite antiquated, yet still the only useful mechanical dive timing device available to date. Modern dive watches now employ a “count-up” bezel, where the zero marker is aligned with the minute hand at the start of the dive. As time progresses, the diver can easily read elapsed time directly against the bezel markings. A different type of bezels used on dive watches are (multiple) decompression time interval bezels as featured on Doxa and Jenny watches. The bezel inlay containing the markings in the bezel ring can be made of metal or feature more scratch-resistant top materials like technical ceramic or synthetic sapphire.

==== GMT dive watches ====
There are some analog dive watches available with a GMT complication. GMT watches were designed for long-haul aircrew and other users who want to track time in different time zones. These watches have an additional GMT watch hand and in the case of diving watches can have a rotating bezel with 24-hours markings instead of minute markings used for reading of elapsed time. With the help of the GMT hand and a correctly adjusted 24-hours bezel the time in two different time zones can be easily read without having to perform arithmetic.

=== Crystal ===
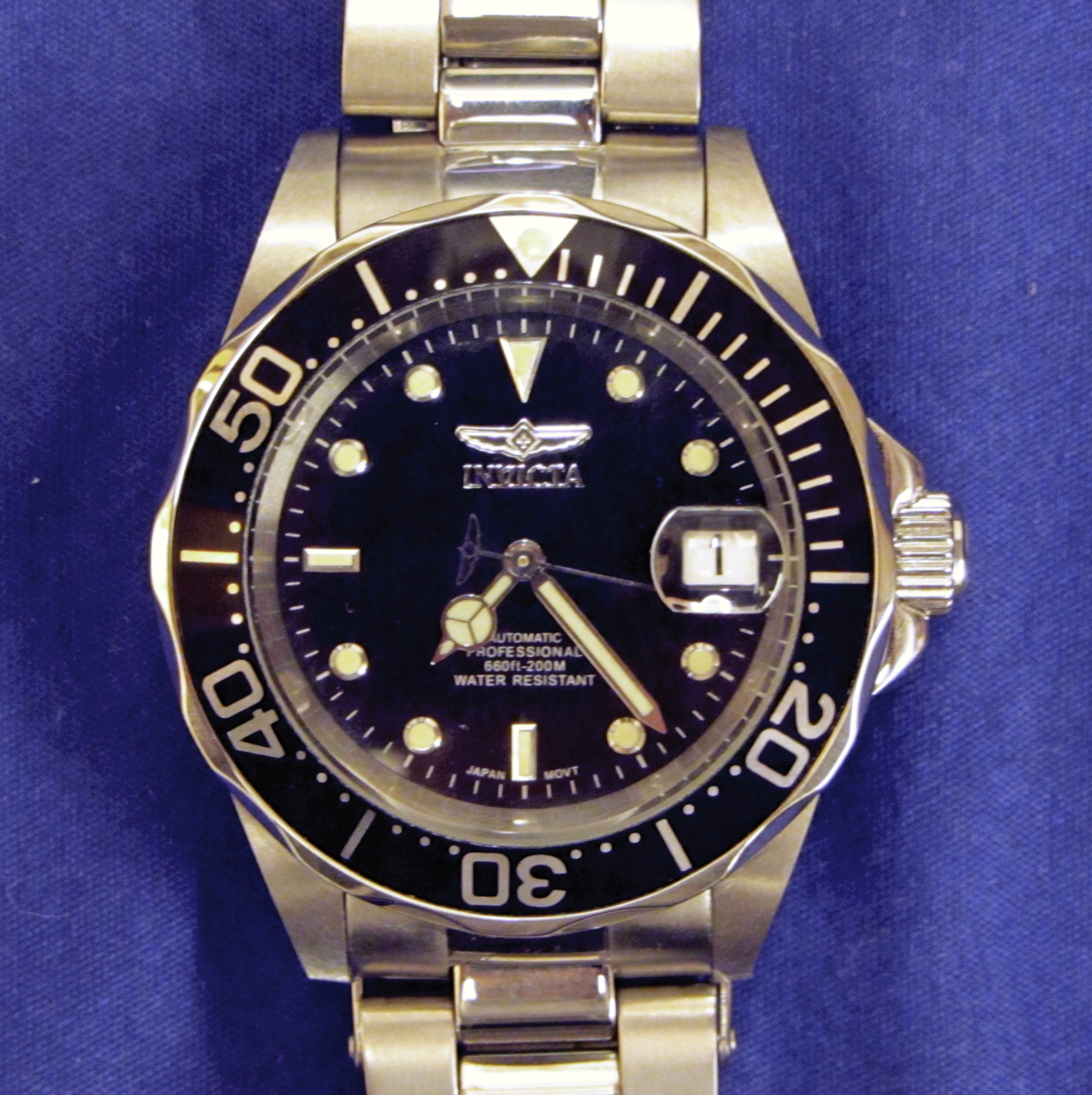
Invicta Automatic Pro Diver Watch 8926 has a flat crystal

Diving watches have relatively thick watch crystals. Sometimes domed crystals are used to enhance the pressure-resistance of the watch and to improve the watch face legibility under water. The typical materials used for crystals are acrylic glass, hardened glass and synthetic sapphire which all have their pros and cons. Acrylic glass is very resistant to breakage; it can easily be scratched, but small scratches can be buffed out with polishing compounds. Hardened glass is more scratch-resistant than acrylic glass and less brittle than sapphire. Sapphire is very scratch-resistant but less shatterproof than the other options. Anti-reflective coatings are generally applied on sapphire crystals to enhance the legibility of the watch. Some manufacturers use sapphire/hardened glass laminate crystals, where the scratch-resistance of sapphire is combined with the better shatter-resistance of hardened glass.

Watch crystals can also be applied as display backs to view the watch movement, but these are a rare feature on diving watches.

=== Crown ===
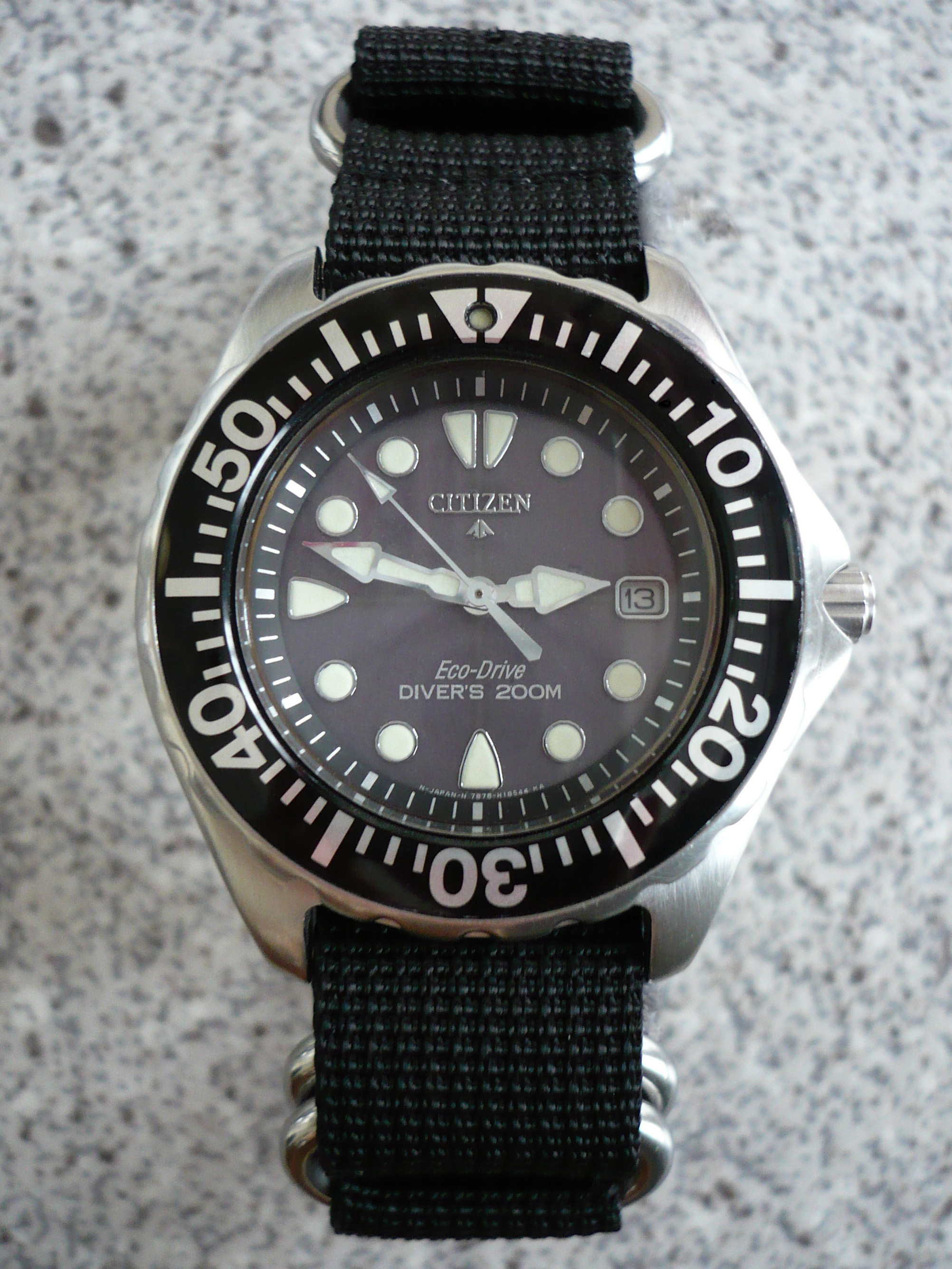
Citizen Promaster Eco-Drive AP0440-14F Diver's 200 m with integrated crown shoulders

Analog diving watches must have a water resistant crown. Some models have the crown mounted in unconventional positions like 4, 8 or 9 o'clock to avert or reduce discomfort from the crown touching the wearers (left) wrist or back of the hand. Often the crown has to be unscrewed to set or adjust the time and date and afterwards retightened to restore the water resistance of the watch and minimize the chance of unintentional operation under water. There are also watch models where a locking handle, separate knob or an extra crown cover has to be manipulated before the crown can be operated. There are however models that have crowns that are operated like the crowns of non diver's analog watches. Screw down or otherwise locking crowns and traditionally operated water resistant crowns should not be operated under water. The watch case of diving and other tool watches often feature protruding crown protectors or (integrated) crown guards/shoulders for (semi-)recessing the crown and hence reduce mechanical damage and snagging risks.

=== Pushers ===
Digital and some analog chronograph diving watches – such as the Breitling Avenger Seawolf Chronograph or Sinn U1000 – have specially designed push pieces that can be operated at depth without allowing water to enter the case.

=== Helium release valve ===
Some diving watches intended for saturation diving at great depths are fitted with a helium or mixed breathing gas release or escape valve to prevent incidents such as the crystal from being blown off by an internal pressure build up caused by helium that has seeped into the watch case in helium enriched environments (helium atoms are the smallest natural gas particles found in nature) as the watch and diver adjust to normal atmospheric conditions. Other helium safe/for mixed-gas rated diving watches can withstand the helium used in certain diving situations by using gaskets that simply do not allow helium gas to enter the watch case in a harmful way in the first place.

=== Watch strap/bracelet ===
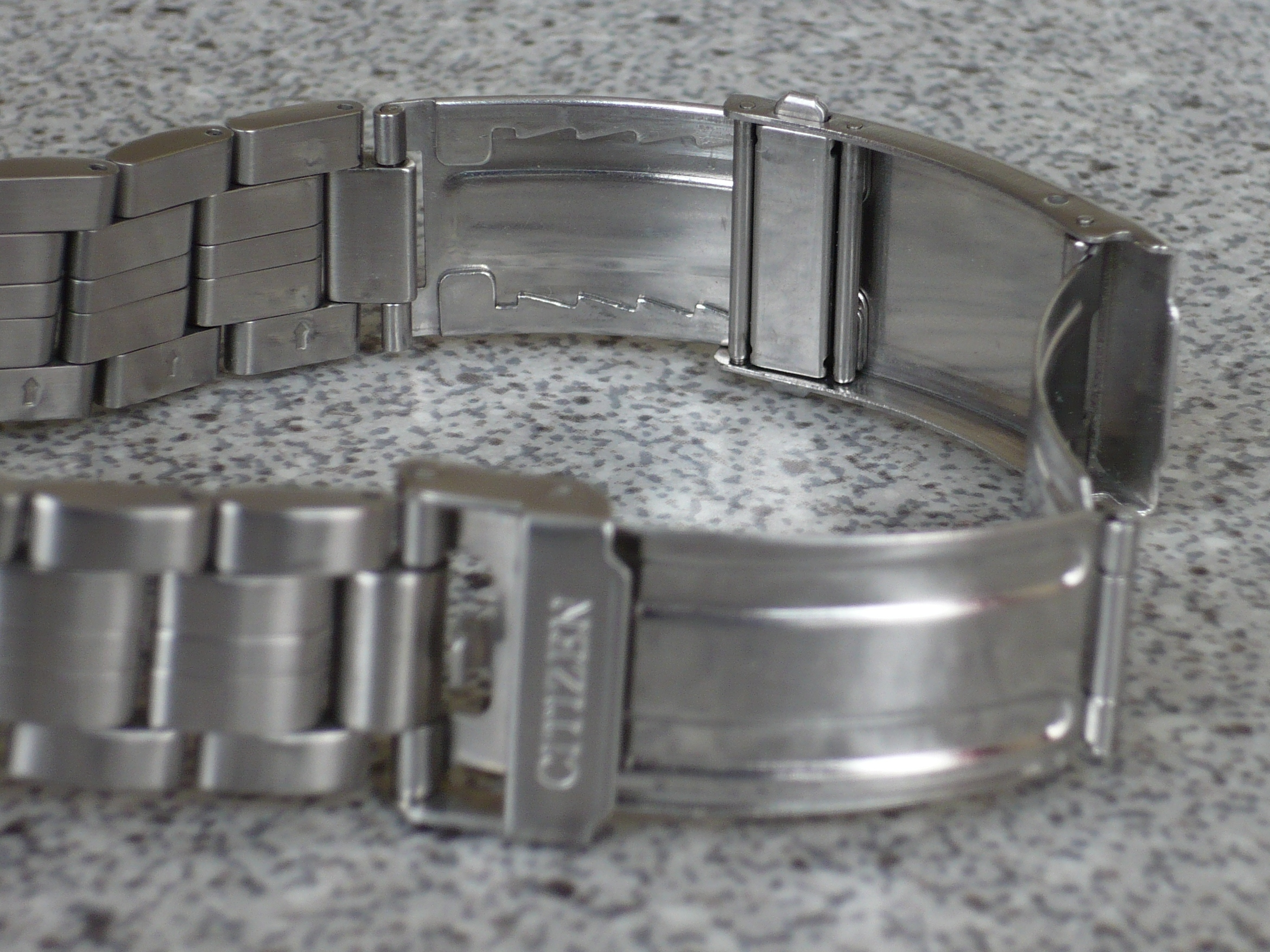
Stainless steel bracelet deployant clasp with divers extension

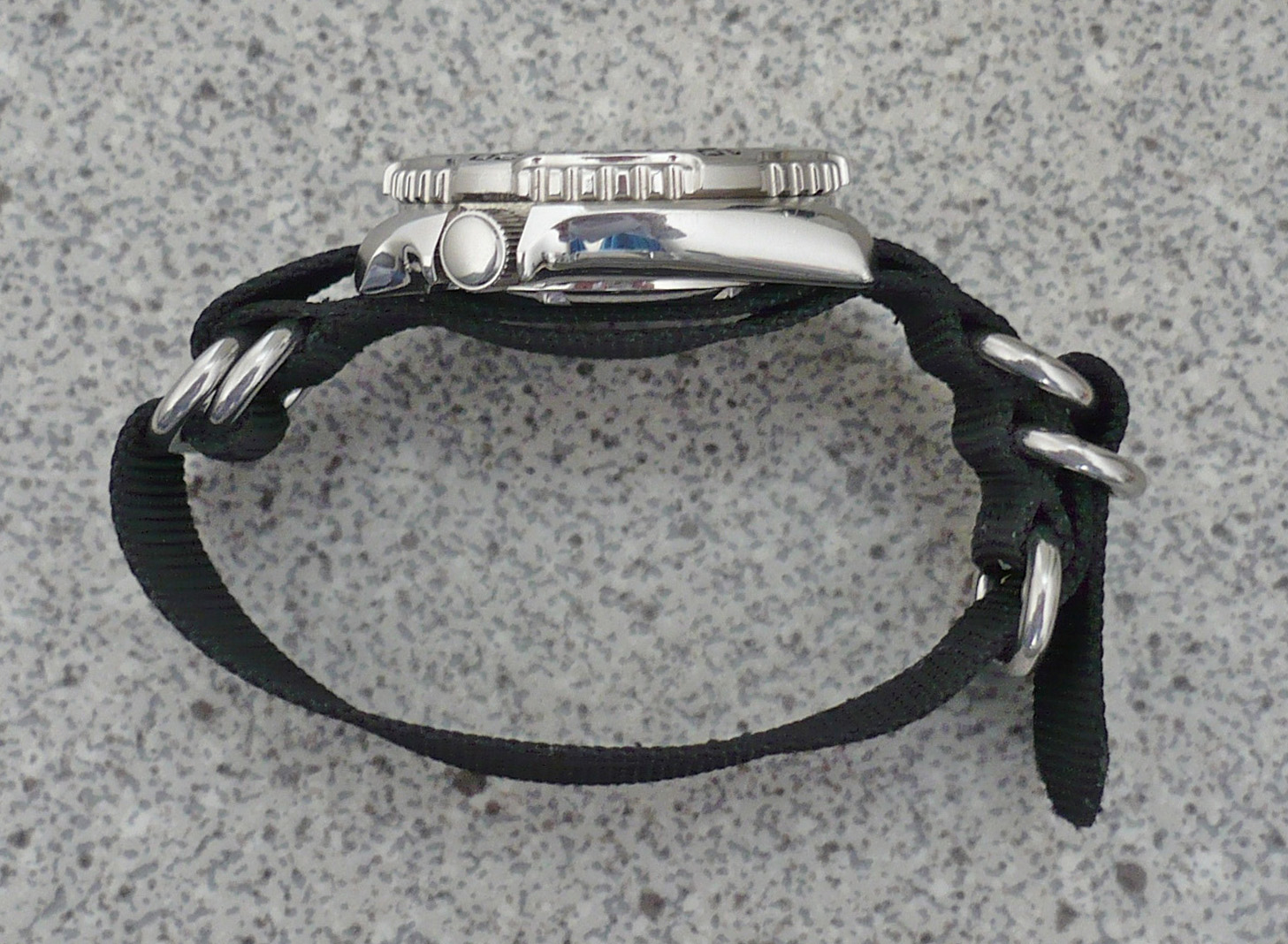
Nylon fabric strap used to minimize the chance of losing the watch

Watch straps or bracelets for diving watches are generally made of materials that are adequately water (pressure) resistant and able to endure the galvanic corrosiveness of seawater. In practical terms most diving watches feature a rubber, silicone rubber, FKM-rubber, polyurethane or fabric watch strap or a stainless steel or titanium metal link or mesh bracelet of adequate length to facilitate wearing the watch over a diving suit sleeve. For a wrist with a 200 mm (7.9 in) circumference wearing a 4 mm (0.16 in) thick diving suit sleeve increases the strap or bracelet length required the fit the watch over the sleeved wrist to 225 mm (8.9 in). For this bracelets often have a (concealed) divers extension deployant clasp by which the bracelet can be appropriately extended by approximately 20 mm (0.79 in) to 30 mm (1.2 in). Some watch straps allow an increase in length by adding a diving suit extension strap piece to the standard watch strap. If required more than one diving suit extension strap piece can be added to the standard watch strap. With increasing depth and rising water pressure the (sleeved) wrist of a diver is exposed to compression effects that have a shrinking effect on the wrist circumference. Many watch straps intended for diving watches have rippled or vented sections near the attachment points on the watch case to facilitate the required flexibility to strap the watch tightly for normal wear at the surface whilst keeping the watch sufficiently tightly in place on the divers wrist at depth. Metal link bracelets theoretically have more failure points compared to metal mesh bracelets and watch straps due to the use of link connection parts like split pins or screw pins. One piece (NATO style) nylon fabric straps that slide under the watch case through both spring bars (or attaching points between the watch case and strap) are used to minimize the chance of losing the watch due to a spring bar or attachment point failure.

Among elastomer straps, materials differ in how well they hold up in seawater. Fluoroelastomer (FKM) straps resist saltwater, ultraviolet light, heat and chemicals such as sunscreen better than standard silicone rubber. They are less prone to cracking, swelling and surface degradation after repeated exposure, which is why many dive-oriented straps use FKM or vulcanized rubber compounds. Silicone straps are softer and more pliable when new, but their softer surface tends to attract lint and residue and to age faster with prolonged exposure to sun, sweat and saltwater. Buckles and keepers on dive straps are typically made of stainless steel or titanium, and the strap ends near the lugs are often reinforced because they take the most stress. After a dive, rinsing the strap in fresh water and letting it air-dry is recommended to prevent salt and chlorine residue from building up.

=== Legibility ===
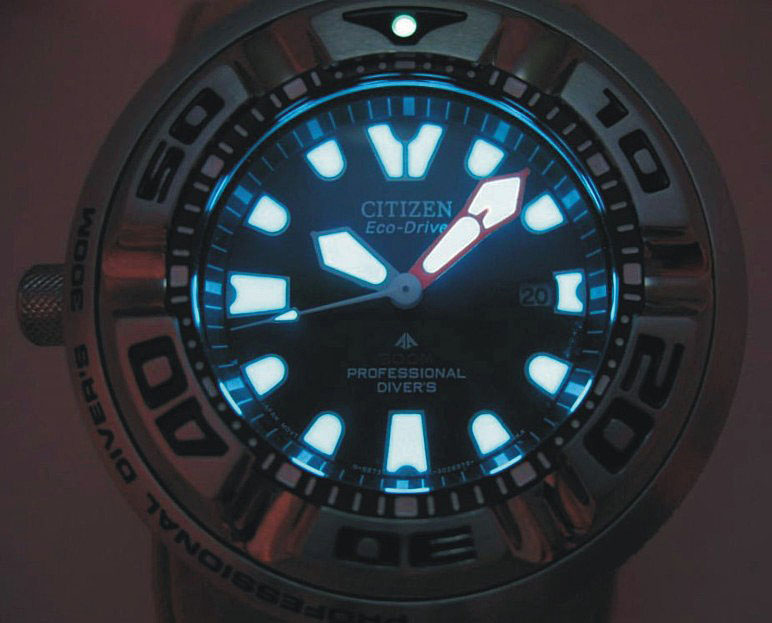
Lume applied on a diver's watch to make it readable in low light conditions

The dials and markers on the watch face and bezel have to be legible under water and in low light conditions. An indication that the watch is running in total darkness also has to be present. For easy legibility most diving watches have high contrasting, non-cluttered dials and markers with a large, easily identifiable minute hand. The markers for 3, 6, 9 and (especially) 12 o'clock on the watch face and the zero marker on the bezel of analogue diver's watches are usually conspicuously styled to prevent disorientation induced read out errors. A styling of the hands where no hand can temporarily totally overlay and hence obscure the position of another hand is also desirable to promote constant legibility and prevent read out errors. For low light conditions luminous phosphorescent non-toxic strontium-aluminate-based lume pigments marketed under brand names like Super-LumiNova, Lumibrite or NoctiLumina and tritium-based self-powered lighting devices called "gaseous tritium light source" (GTLS) are applied on the dials and markers. On digital diving watches, lighted displays are used for legibility under low light conditions.

=== Power-reserve indicator ===
A diving watch with an electric battery powered movement must have an End-Of-Life (EOL) indicator, usually in the form of a two or four second jump of the second hand or a warning message on a digital display to safeguard against insufficient power reserve during underwater activities. Some electric and mechanical powered movement models have power reserve indicators that show the current power status of the watch.

== Water resistance ==
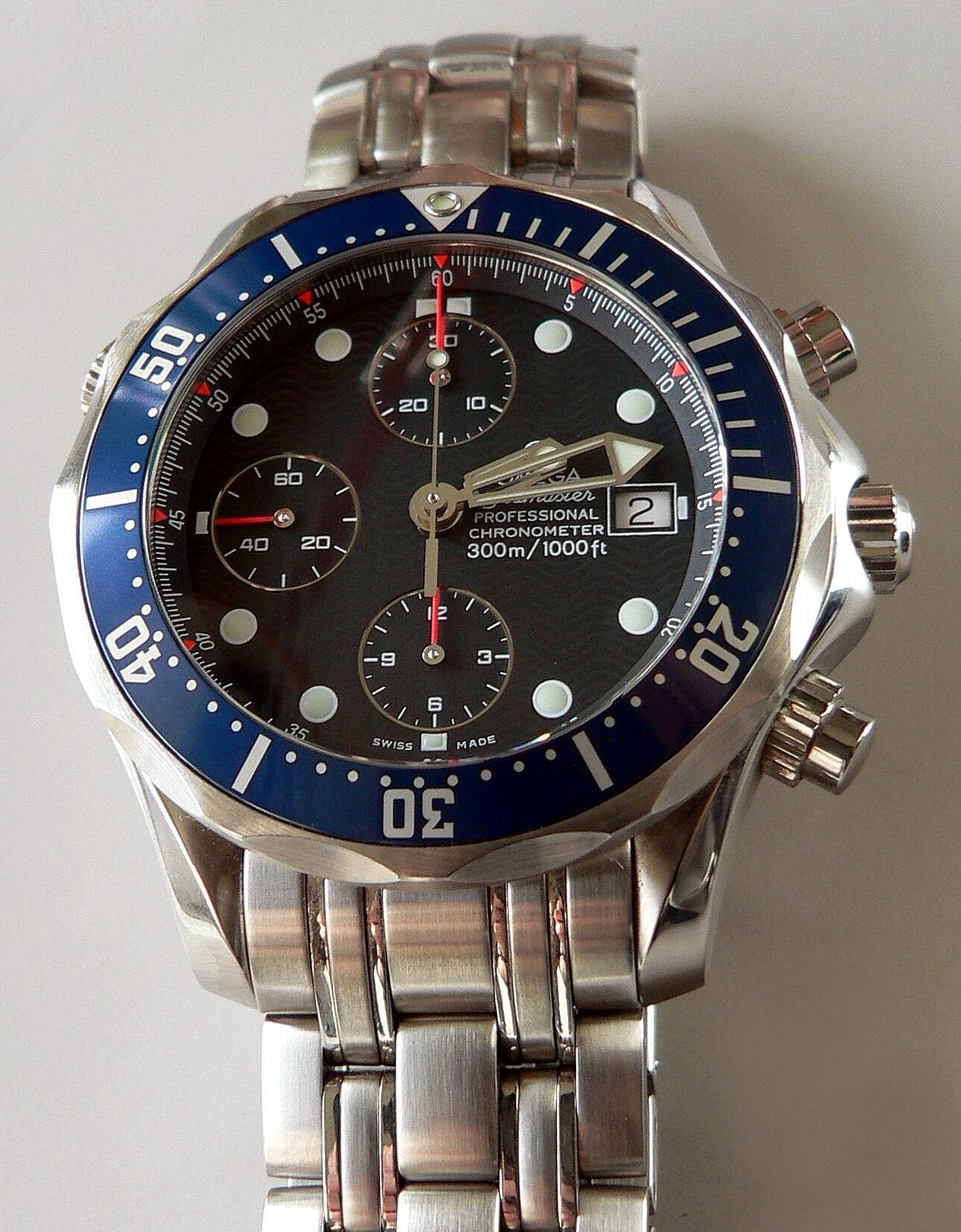
Omega Seamaster 300 M Chrono Diver Chronograph featuring pushers next to the crown

The International Organization for Standardization issued a standard for water resistant watches which also prohibits the term waterproof to be used with watches, which many countries have adopted.

Water resistance is achieved by the gaskets which forms a watertight seal, used in conjunction with a sealant applied on the case to help keep water out. The material of the case must also be tested in order to pass as water resistant.

None of the tests defined by ISO 2281 for the Water Resistant mark are suitable to qualify a watch for scuba diving. Such watches are designed for everyday life and must be water resistant during exercises such as swimming. They can be worn in different temperature and pressure conditions but are under no circumstances designed for scuba diving.

The standards for diving watches are regulated by the ISO 6425 international standard. The watches are tested in static or still water under 125% of the rated (water) pressure, thus a watch with a 200 m rating will be water resistant if it is stationary and under 250 m of static water. The testing of the water resistance is fundamentally different from non-dive watches, because every watch has to be fully tested.

ISO 6425 water resistance testing of a diver's watch consists of:

- Immersion of the watch in 30 cm of water for 50 hours.
- Immersion of the watch in water under 125% of the rated pressure with a force of 5 N perpendicular to the crown and pusher buttons (if any) for 10 minutes.
- Immersion of the watch in 30 cm of water at the following temperatures for 5 minutes each, 40 °C, 5 °C and 40 °C again, with the transition between temperatures not to exceed 1 minute. No evidence of water intrusion or condensation is allowed.
- Immersion of the watch in a suitable pressure vessel and subjecting it to 125% of the rated pressure for 2 hours. The pressure must be applied within 1 minute. Subsequently, the overpressure shall be reduced to 0.3 bar within 1 minute and maintained at this pressure for 1 hour. No evidence of water intrusion or condensation is allowed.

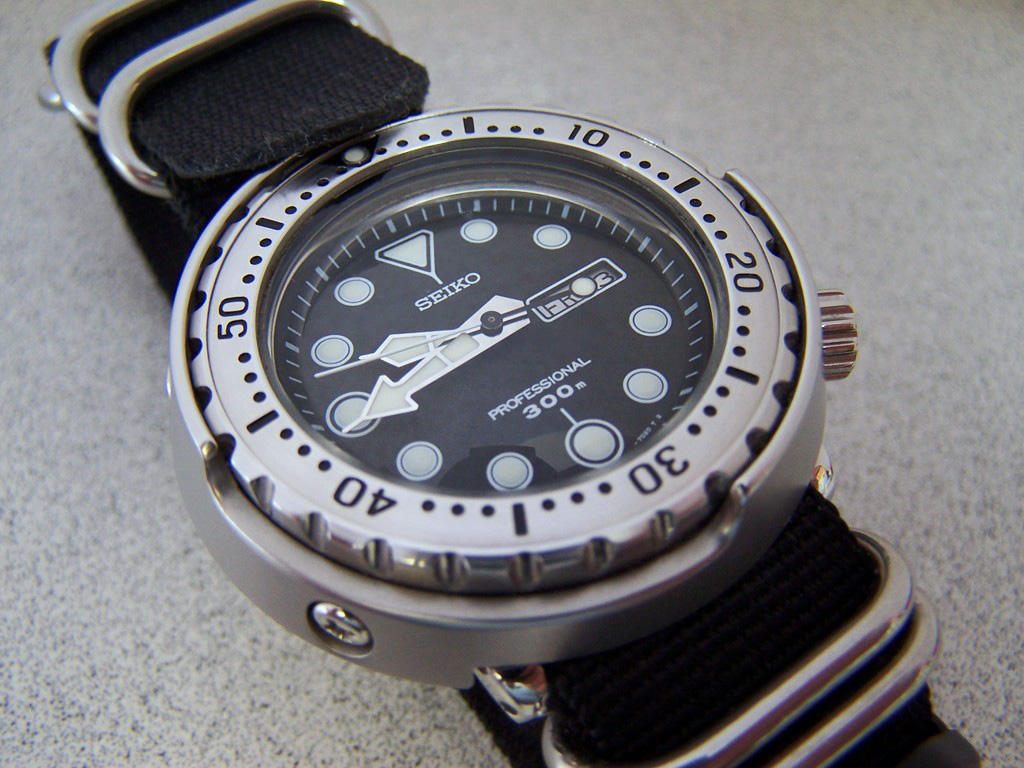
Seiko SBBN007 Professional Diver's 300 m for mixed-gas diving

- For mixed-gas diving the watch has to be immersed in a suitable pressure vessel and subjecting it to 125% of the rated pressure for 15 days in a (helium enriched) breathing gas mix. Subsequently, the overpressure shall be reduced to normal pressure within 3 minutes. No evidence of water intrusion, condensation or problems caused by internal overpressure are allowed.
- An optional test originating from the ISO 2281 tests (but not required for obtaining ISO 6425 approval) is exposing the watch to an overpressure of 2 bar, no more than 50 μg/min of air is allowed to get inside the case.

Except the thermal shock resistance test all further ISO 6425 testing should be conducted at 18 °C to 25 °C temperature. The required 125% test pressure provides a safety margin against dynamic pressure increase events, water density variations (seawater is 2 to 5% denser than freshwater) and degradation of the seals.

Movement-induced dynamic pressure increase is sometimes the subject of urban myths and marketing arguments for diver's watches with high water resistance ratings. When a diver makes a fast swimming movement of 10 m/s (33 ft/s) (the best competitive swimmers and finswimmers cannot swim nearly that fast) physics dictates that the diver generates a dynamic pressure of 0.5 bars (50 kPa) or the equivalent of 5 meters of additional water depth.

=== Water resistance classification ===
Watches are classified by their degree of water resistance, which roughly translates to the following (1 meter ≈ 3.28 feet):

Water resistance rating	Suitability	Remarks
Water Resistant or 50 m	Suitable for swimming, no snorkeling water related work, and fishing.	NOT suitable for diving.
Water Resistant 100 m	Suitable for recreational surfing, swimming, snorkeling, sailing and water sports.	NOT suitable for diving.
Water Resistant 200 m	Suitable for professional marine activity and serious surface water sports.	Suitable for skin diving only. NOT suitable for scuba diving.
Diver's 100 m	Minimum ISO standard (ISO 6425) for scuba diving at depths NOT suitable for saturation diving.	Diver's 100 m and 150 m watches are generally old(er) watches.
Diver's 200 m or 300 m	Suitable for scuba diving at depths NOT suitable for saturation diving.	Typical ratings for contemporary diver's watches.
Diver's 300^{+} m for mixed-gas diving	Suitable for saturation diving (helium-enriched environment).	Watches designed for mixed-gas diving will have the DIVER’S WATCH xxx M FOR MIXED-GAS DIVING additional marking to point this out.

Note: The depth specified on the watch dial or case represents the results of tests done in the lab, not in the ocean.

Some watches are rated in bars instead of meters. Since 1 bar is approximately the pressure exerted by 10 m of water, a rating in bars may be multiplied by 10 to be approximately equal to that based on meters. Therefore, a 20 bar watch is equivalent to a 200-meter watch. Some watches are rated in atmospheres (atm), which are about 1% greater than bars. In the United Kingdom, scuba divers and others often use the word atmosphere interchangeably with bar (1 atm = 1.01325 bar, or 101,325 Pa).

=== Watches designed for extreme water resistance ===
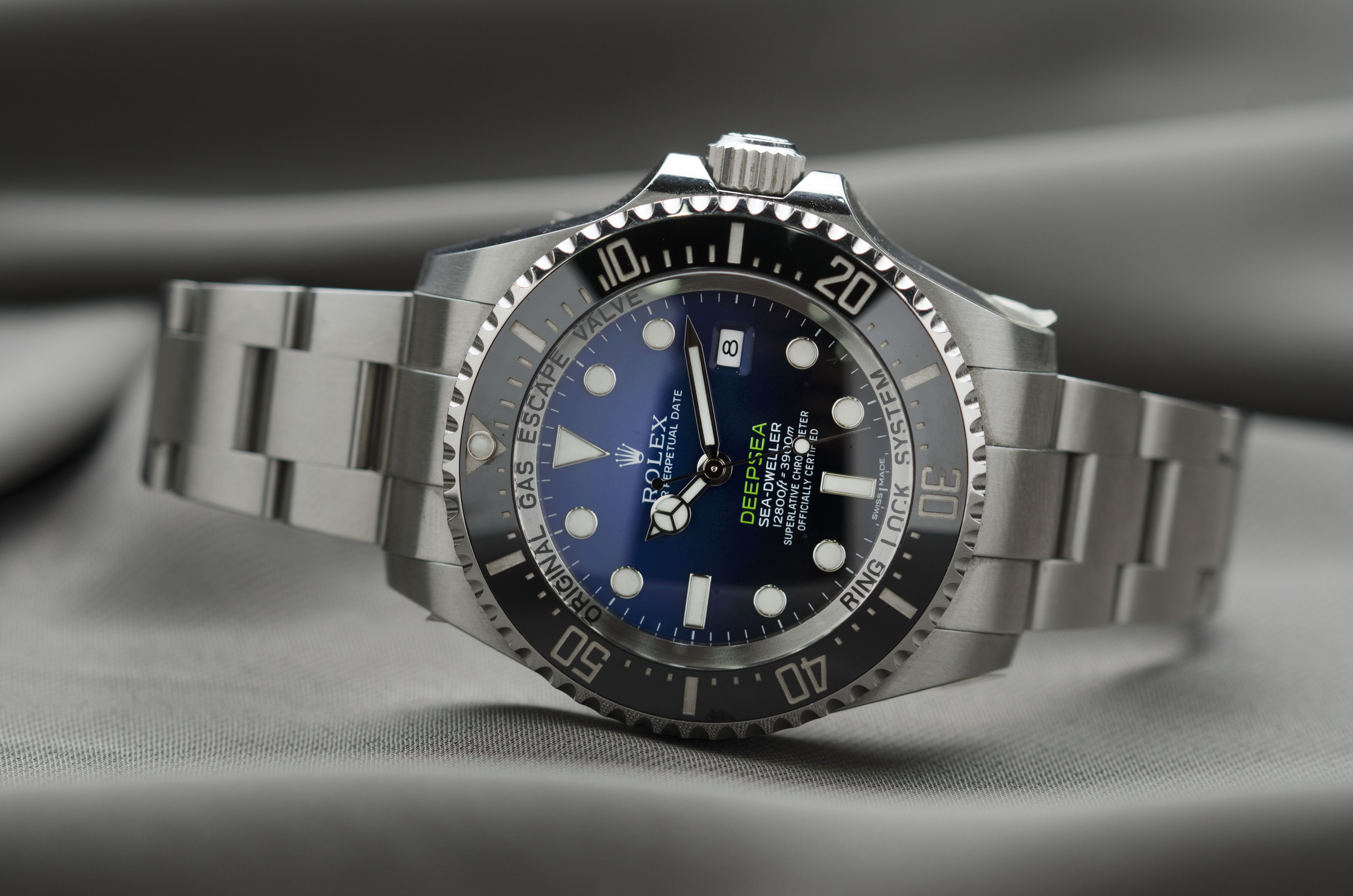
Rolex Sea Dweller DEEPSEA model 116660, with a water resistance of 3,900 m (12,800 ft)

The design and actual availability of divers' watches certified for more than 1,000 to 1,200 metres (3,300 to 3,900 ft) is not explicable solely by practical diving needs nor crewed deep diving experiments, because of the constraints set by physiological limits for fit humans. The diving depth record for off-shore (saturation) diving was achieved in 1988 by a team of professional divers of the Comex S.A., industrial deep-sea diving company performing pipe line connection exercises at a depth of 534 m (1,752 ft) of seawater (msw/fsw) in the Mediterranean Sea as part of the Hydra 8 programme. In 1992, a Comex diver achieved a simulated 701 m (2,300 ft) of seawater depth in an on-shore hyperbaric chamber as part of the Hydra 10 programme. A Hydreliox (hydrogen–helium–oxygen) gas mixture was used as breathing gas. The watches used during these scientific record dives were Rolex Sea-Dwellers with a 1,220 m (4,000 ft) depth rating and these feats were used in advertising. The complexity, medical problems and physiological limits such as those imposed by high-pressure nervous syndrome and accompanying high costs of professional saturation diving to depths exceeding 300 m (984 ft) and the development of deep water atmospheric diving suits and remotely operated underwater vehicles in offshore oilfield drilling and production effectively nixed the need for ever deeper non-atmospheric crewed intervention in the ocean. These practical factors make watch depth ratings of more than 1,000 to 1,200 metres (3,300 to 3,900 ft) marketing and technical show off curiosities.

==== Air-filled watches ====
In 2022, Rolex introduced the Oyster Perpetual Deepsea Challenge Sea-Dweller (reference 126067), a full ocean depth capable watch with an official depth rating of 11,000 metres (36,090 ft). This watch represented in its launch year the most water resistant mechanical watch in serial production. To obtain this official depth rating, the watch is tested to a depth of 13,750 metres (45,110 ft) to offer the 25% safety reserve required by the ISO 6425 divers' watches standard. Normal surface air-filled watch cases and crystals designed for extreme depths must be dimensionally large to cope with the encountered water pressure. The Rolex Deepsea Challenge normal surface air-filled watch case has a diameter of 50.0 mm (1.97 in) and a thickness of 23.0 mm (0.91 in) (domed crystal thickness 9.5 mm (0.37 in)) and the grade 5 titanium case and bracelet weigh 251 g (8.9 oz). The German H2O watch GmbH offers custom-made H2O Kalmar 2 25000M mechanical diving watches, that have been certified to a depth of 25,000 metres (82,020 ft), which is much deeper than full ocean depth. The titanium H2O Kalmar 2 25000M watch case has a diameter of 42.5 mm (1.67 in) and a thickness of 22.85 mm (0.900 in) (domed crystal thickness 8.25 mm (0.325 in)) and weighs 126 g (4.4 oz).

==== Liquid-filled watches ====
The cases of some diving watches designed for extreme depths are filled with silicone oil or fluorinated oil (oil in which all the hydrogen is replaced by fluorine) exploiting the relative incompressibility of liquids. This technology only works with quartz movements as a mechanical movement does not work properly in the oil-filled case. An example of these watches is the Sinn UX (EZM 2B), whose case is certified by Germanischer Lloyd for 12,000 m (39,000 ft), which is deeper than the Challenger Deep. However, the quartz controlled movement is only certified for 5,000 m (16,000 ft). A problem with this technology is to accommodate for thermal expansion of the liquid contained inside the watch. The employed oil changes volume by 10% over a temperature range from −20 °C (−4 °F) to 60 °C (140 °F). This property endangers a traditional watch case since the crystal would blow out from any significant internal overpressure. On the UX (EZM 2B), the case back contains a large movable piston with an o-ring seal, allowing the liquid inside the watch case to expand and contract to adjust internal fluid volume and equalize with outside pressure. The liquid filling improves the watch face legibility under water significantly, due to reduced refractive index differences between the watch crystal and its adjacent media and eliminates crystal fogging due to condensation. To obtain its water resistance the Sinn UX (EZM 2B) stainless steel watch case has a diameter of 44 mm, thickness of 13.3 mm and the case and bracelet weigh 105 g. This is dimensionally modest compared to air-filled diving watches designed for extreme depths.

==== Full ocean depth prototype/experimental watches ====
In January 1960, a Rolex Deep Sea Special prototype diving watch attached to the hull of the bathyscaphe Trieste reached a record depth of 10,913 ± 5 m (35,804 ± 16 ft) of seawater during a descent to the bottom of the "Western Pool" of the Challenger Deep, the deepest surveyed point in the oceans. The watch survived and tested as having functioned normally during its descent and ascent. The Deep Sea Special was a technology demonstration and marketing project, and the watch never went into production.

In March 2012, a Rolex Oyster Perpetual Date Sea-Dweller Deepsea Challenge prototype diving watch attached to a manipulator arm of the DSV Deepsea Challenger descended to 10,908 m (35,787 ft) in the "Eastern Pool" of the Challenger Deep. The watch was designed to be waterproof up to 1500 bar/15,000 m (49,213 ft) and functioned normally during its descent and ascent. The normal surface air-filled watch case has a diameter of 51.4 mm (2.02 in) and a thickness of 28.5 mm (1.12 in) (domed synthetic sapphire crystal 14.3 mm (0.56 in)) to cope with the water pressure at the deepest surveyed point in the oceans.

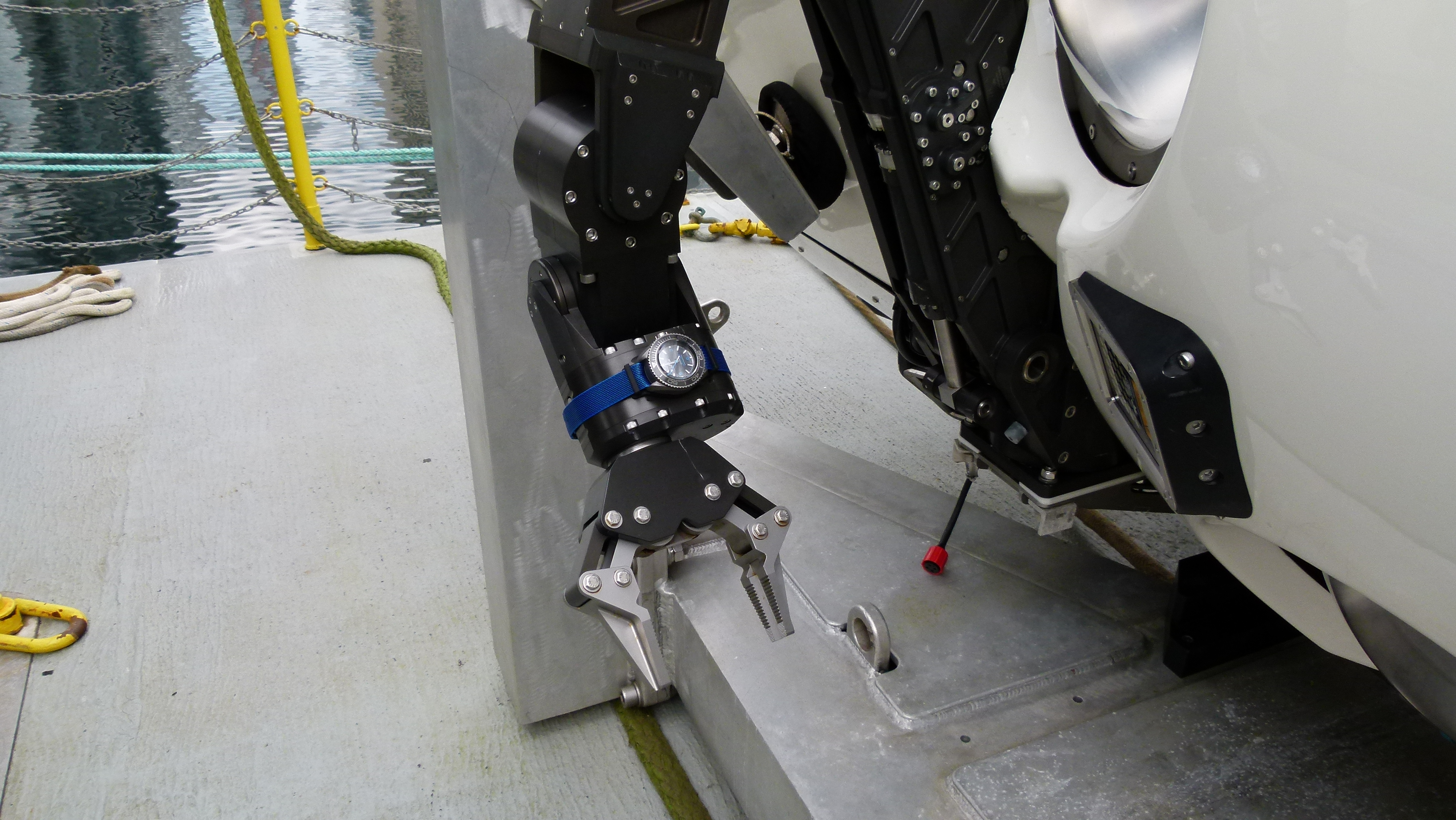
Omega Seamaster Planet Ocean Ultra Deep Professional, strapped on Limiting Factor's manipulator

As of May 2019, the record for the deepest normally functioning experimental diving watch is held by the Omega Seamaster Planet Ocean Ultra Deep Professional after reaching a (revised) depth of 10,925 ± 4 m (35,843 ± 13 ft) of seawater during a descent to the bottom of the "Eastern Pool" of the Challenger Deep by the Five Deeps Expedition. Two of these watches were attached to the outside of the Deep-Submergence Vehicle Limiting Factor: one on each of the main vessel's robotic arms and an additional one on the ultra-deep-sea lander Skaff. Due to a technical problem the watch fixed to the ultra-deep-sea lander stayed on the bottom for two days before it and the lander were salvaged from an unrevised depth of 10,927 m (35,850 ft). The normal surface air-filled watch case is made of (DNV GL certified) forged grade 5 Titanium alloy (same as the hull of the DSV Limiting Factor) has a 55 mm (2.17 in) diameter and is almost 28 mm (1.10 in) thick and has been tested and certified for up to 1500 bar/15,000 m (49,213 ft).

== Maintenance ==
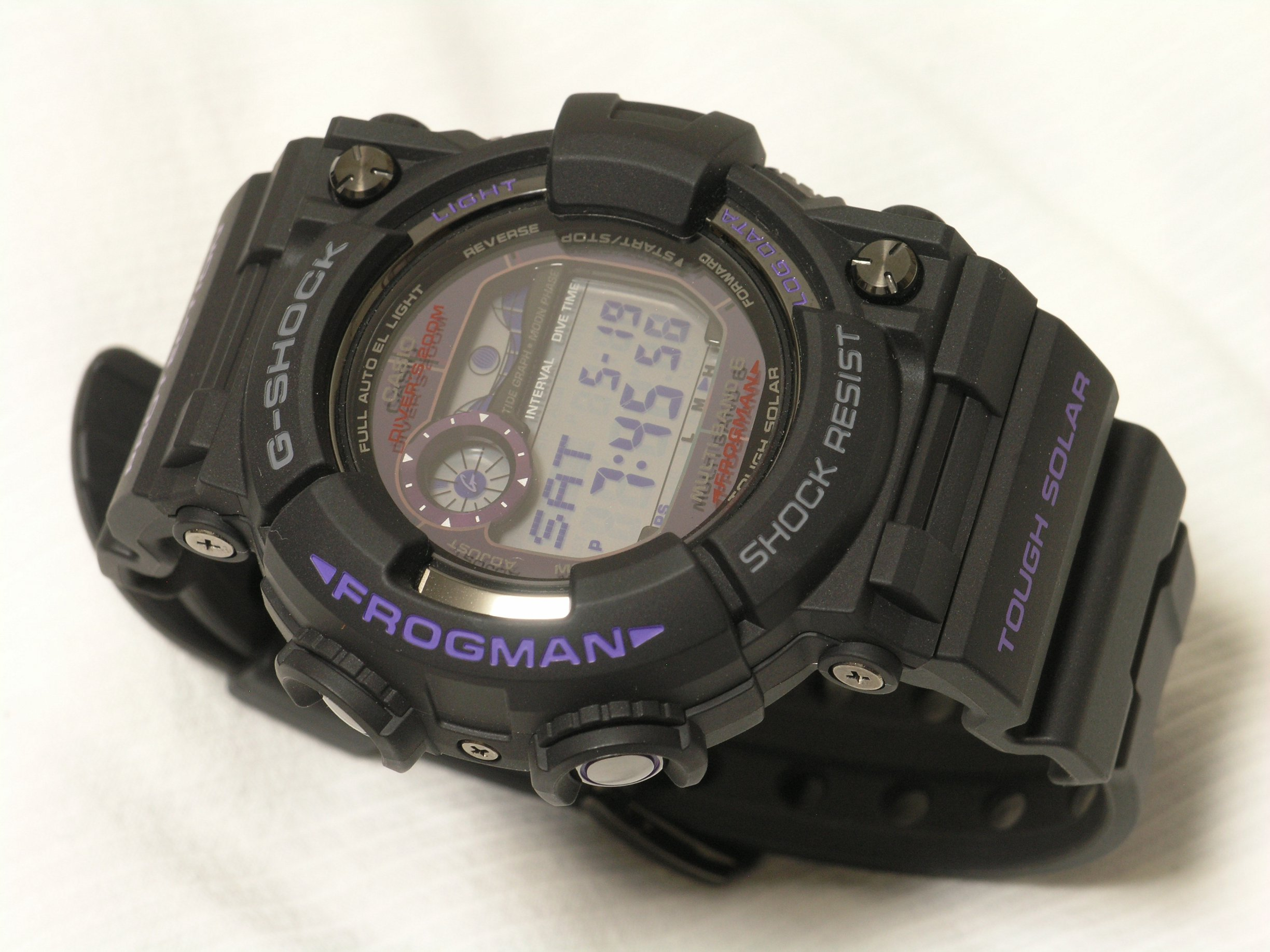
Casio G-Shock Frogman Tough Solar MULTIBAND6 GWF-1000BP-1JF digital Diver's 200 m on a polymer strap

Diving watch manufacturers recommend divers to have their diving watch pressure tested by a service and repair facility annually or every two to five years and have the seals or gaskets replaced. Besides that, simple maintenance by the owner is also important. Manufacturers recommend rinsing the watch in fresh water after use in seawater, but leaving a diver's watch in fresh water overnight is a good method to protect the watch from corrosion and to keep the crown, bezel, buttons and pressure sensors on digital ones working. Some watch companies have restricting or limiting policies like manufacturer service center maintenance and repair only in effect that can interfere with other precautionary and maintenance policies or expeditious turnaround, modification or long term support needs.

=== Precautions ===
Divers have to inspect their watch and the wrist band for defects before every dive and especially in case it came into contact with dirt, gasoline or strong chemicals, powerful magnetic fields or was banged against something hard during use. Additionally, watches with mechanical movements should also be hand-wound or in case of automatic movements that can not be hand-wound given sufficient motion to self-wind before every dive to ensure a fully charged mainspring.

== See also ==
- Chronometer
- Bottom timer – An electronic instrument that records depth and elapsed time data on an underwater dive
- Dive computer – Instrument to calculate decompression status in real time
- Pilot watch – Wristwatch designed for use by aircraft pilots
- Trench watch – Early wristwatch design used in World War I
- Military watches – Wristwatch designed for military use
- Mission timer – Clock for measuring time duration
- List of 24-hour watch brands
