= Super-LumiNova =

Photoluminescent pigment

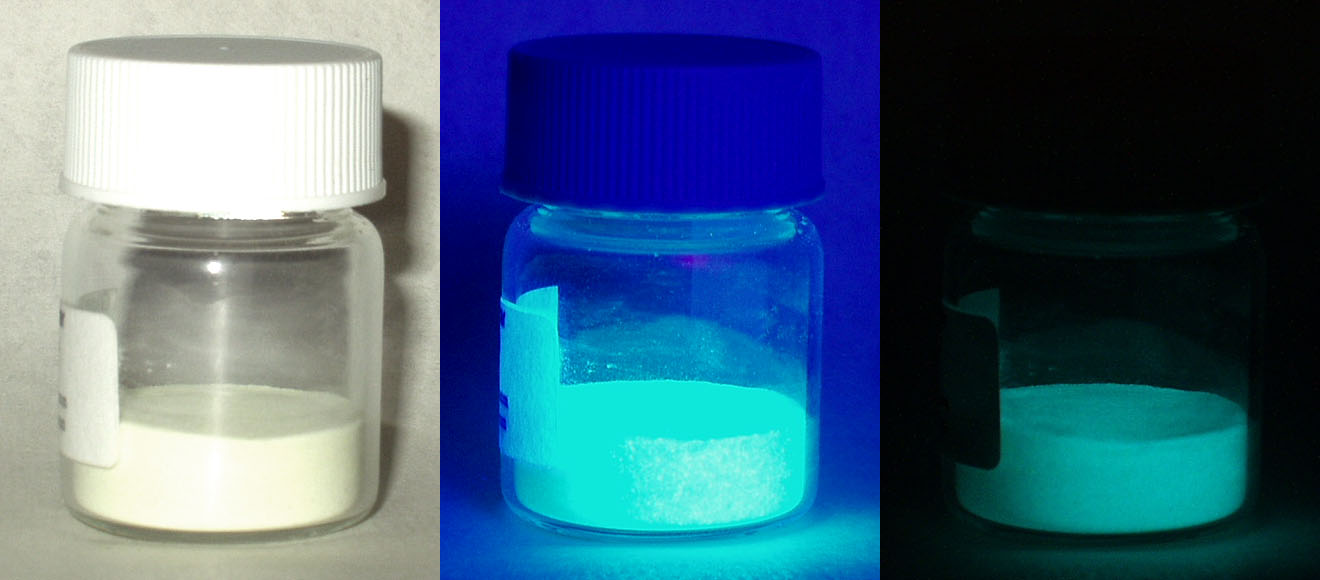
Europium doped strontium silicate-aluminate oxide powder under visible light, long-wave ultraviolet, and in total darkness.

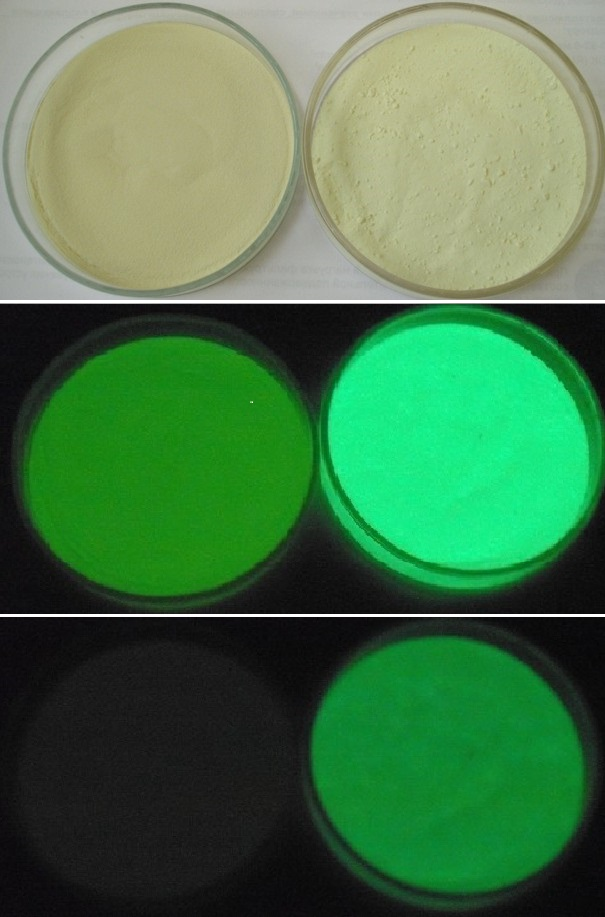
Phosphorescent pigments performance, in visible light, in dark, after 4 minutes in dark - zinc sulfide (left) and strontium aluminate (right) based materials

Super-LumiNova is a brand name under which strontium aluminate–based non-radioactive and nontoxic photoluminescent or afterglow pigments for illuminating markings on watch dials, hands and bezels, etc. in the dark are marketed. When activated with a suitable dopant (Europium and Dysprosium), it acts as a photoluminescent phosphor with long persistence of phosphorescence. This technology offers up to ten times higher brightness than previous zinc sulfide–based materials.

These types of phosphorescent pigments, often called lume, operate like a rechargeable light battery. After sufficient activation by sunlight, fluorescent, LED, UV (blacklight), incandescent and other light sources, they glow in the dark for hours. Electrons within the pigment are being "excited" by ultraviolet light exposure—the excitation wavelengths for strontium aluminate range from 200 to 450 nm electromagnetic radiation—to a higher energetic state and after the excitation source is removed, fall back to their normal energetic state by releasing the energy loss as visible light over a period of time. Although fading over time, appropriately thick applicated larger markings remain visible for dark adapted human eyes for the whole night. This Ultraviolet light exposure induced activation and subsequent light emission process can be repeated again and again.

== History ==
Nemoto & Co., Ltd. – a global manufacturer of phosphorescent pigments and other specialized phosphors – was founded by Kenzo Nemoto in December 1941 as a luminous paint processing company and has supplied and developed luminous paint to the watch and clock and aviation instruments industry since. Super-LumiNova is based on LumiNova branded pigments, invented in 1993 by the Nemoto staff members Yoshihiko Murayama, Nobuyoshi Takeuchi, Yasumitsu Aoki and Takashi Matsuzawa as a safe replacement for radium-based luminous paints. The invention was patented in 1994 by Nemoto & Co., Ltd. and licensed to other manufacturers and watch brands.

In 1998 Nemoto & Co. established a join-venture with RC Tritec AG called LumiNova AG, Switzerland to manufacture 100 percent Swiss made afterglow pigments branded as Super-LumiNova. After that, the production of radioactive luminous compounds by RC Tritec AG was completely stopped. According to RC Tritec AG the Swiss watch brands all use their Super-LumiNova pigments.

== Color variations and grades ==
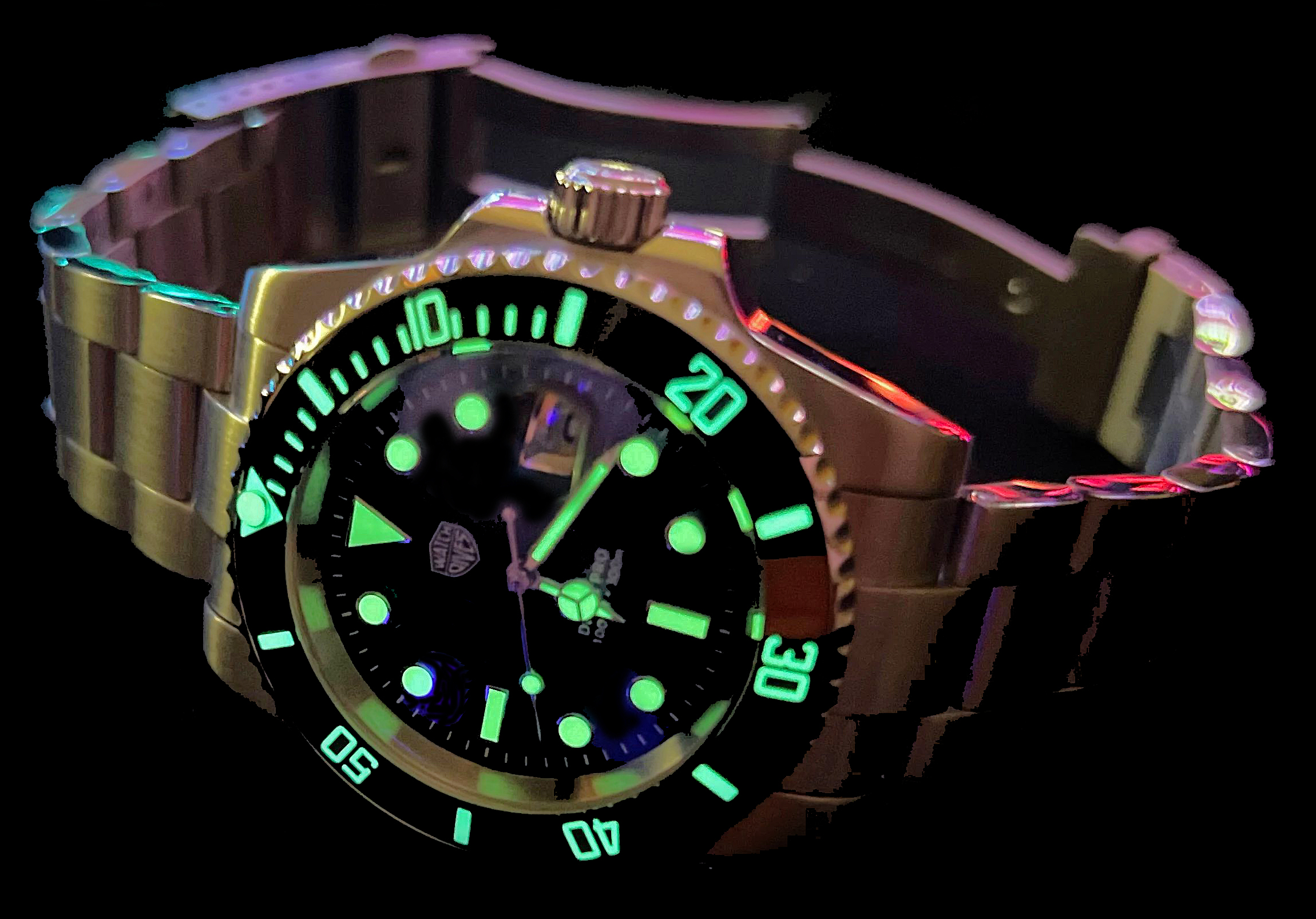
Green (emission at 515 nm) glowing C3 Super-LumiNova applied on a diver's watch to make it readable in low-light conditions.

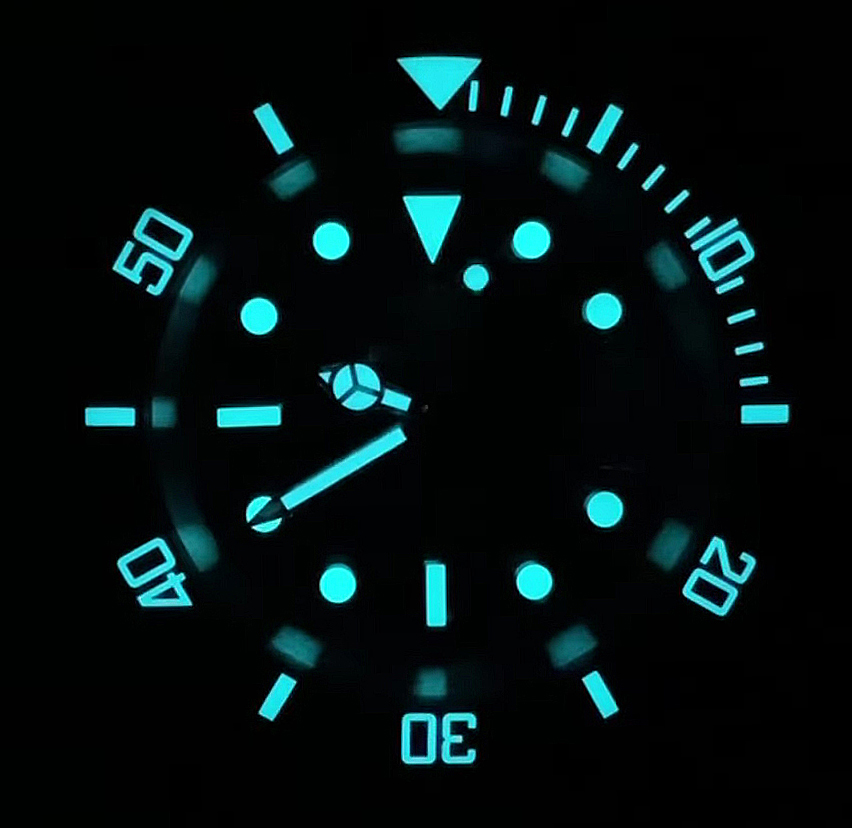
Blue-green (emission at 485 nm) glowing BGW9 Super-LumiNova applied on a similar diver's watch face.

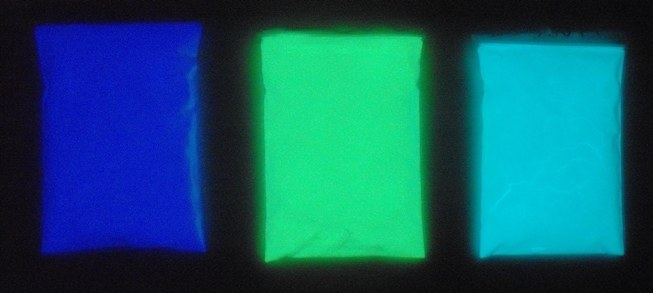
LumiNova pigments in the dark

Over time, RC Tritec AG developed other afterglow color variations than the original Nemoto & Co. C3 green and higher grades of afterglow pigments.

Any other Super-LumiNova emission color offering than C3 is achieved by adding colorants that adsorb light and hence limit the amount of light the afterglow pigment can absorb and emit. After the green glowing and pale yellow-green in daylight appearing C3 (emission at 515 nm) variant, the blue-green glowing and in daylight white appearing BGW9 (emission at 485 nm, close to the turquoise wavelength) color variant is the second most effective variant regarding pure afterglow brightness. Different colors can however be chosen to optimize (perceived) light emission, dictated by the human eye luminous efficiency function variance. Maximal light emission around wavelengths of 555 nm (green) is important for obtaining optimal photopic vision using the eye cone cells for observation in – or just coming from – well-lit conditions. Maximal light emission around wavelengths of 498 nm (cyan) is important for obtaining optimal scotopic vision using the eye rod cells for observation in low-light conditions. Besides technical and human eye dictated reasons, esthetic or other reasons can also influence Super-LumiNova color choices.

Super-LumiNova is offered in three grade levels; Standard, A and X1. The initial brightness of these grades does not significantly vary, but the light intensity decay over time of the A and X1 grades is significantly reduced. This means the X1 grade takes the longest to become too dim to be useful for the human eye. Not all Super-LumiNova color variations are available in three grades. Super-LumiNova technology has the introduction of Grade X2, enhancing watch readability in low-light conditions.

== Stability ==
Due to the fact that no chemical change occurs after a charge-discharge cycle, the pigments theoretically retain their afterglow properties indefinitely. A reduction in light intensity only occurs very slowly, almost imperceptibly. This reduction increases with the degree of coloring of the pigments. Intensely colored types lose their intensity more quickly than neutral ones. High temperatures of up to several hundred degrees Celsius are not a problem. The only thing that needs to be avoided is prolonged contact with water or high humidity, as this creates a hydroxide layer that negatively affects the light emission intensity.

== Uses ==
Besides being used in timepieces by industry and hobbyists, Super-LumiNova is also marketed for application on:

- Instruments: scales, dials, markings, indicators, etc.
- Scales: engravings, silkscreen-printing
- Aviation instruments and markings
- Jewelry
- Safety- and emergency panels, signs, markings
- Aiming posts
- Various other parts

=== Application methods ===
Super-LumiNova granulated pigments are applied either by manual application, screen printing or pad printing. RC Tritec AG recommends up to 0.30 mm (0.012 in) application thickness in one or multiple layer(s). Over that, the ultraviolet light starts getting problems to effectively reach and activate the bottom of the deposited pigment, diminishing the returns for additional application thickness. The pigments and binders are produced separately, as there is no optimal binder for differing applications. This forces RC Tritec AG to offer many solvent and non-solvent based binder systems to maximally concentrate the granulated pigments in the mixture for application on various surfaces.

Alternatively, RC Tritec AG offers Lumicast pieces, which are highly concentrated luminous Super-LumiNova 3D-castings. According to RC Tritec AG these ceramic parts can be made in any customer desired shape and result in a higher light emission brightness when compared to the common application methods. Lumicast pieces can be glued or form fitted on various surfaces.

== Alternative for afterglow pigments ==
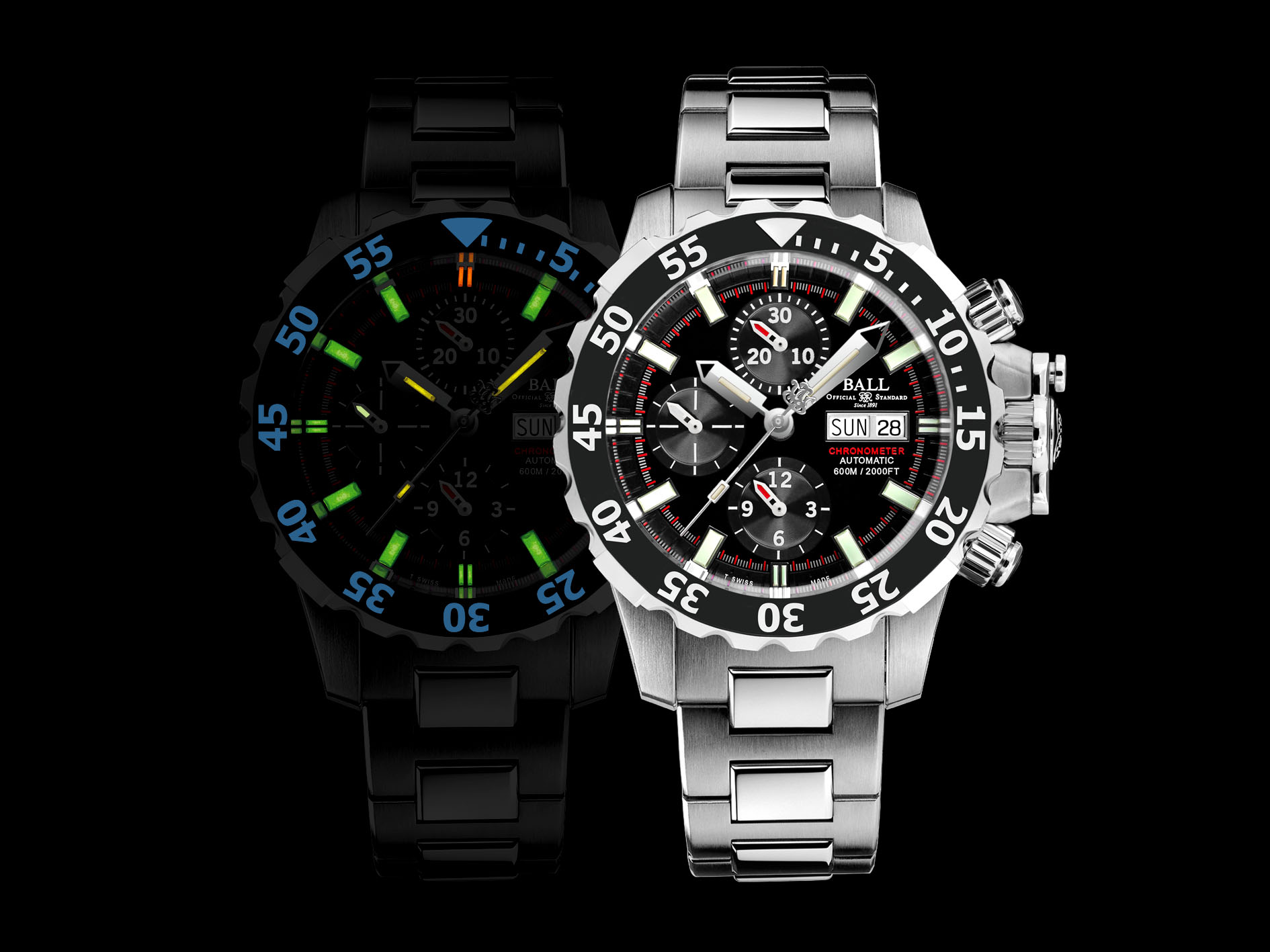
A watch with "gaseous tritium light sources" applied on its dial markers and hands and afterglow pigments applied on its bezel ring

By the late 1960s, radium was phased out and replaced with safer alternatives. Tritium was used on and the original Panerai Luminor dive watch Radiomir and almost all Swiss watches from 1960 to 1998 when it was banned. Tritium-based substances ceased to be used by Omega SA in 1997.

In the 21st century, one radioluminescent alternative for afterglow pigments requiring radiation protection is being produced and used for watches and other uses. These are tritium-based devices called "gaseous tritium light source" (GTLS). GTLS are made using sturdy (often glass) containers internally coated with a phosphor layer and filled with tritium gas before the containers are permanently sealed. They have the advantage of being self-powered and producing a consistent luminosity that does not gradually fade during the night. However, GTLS contain radioactive tritium gas that has a half-life of slightly over 12.3 years. Additionally, phosphor degradation will cause the brightness of a tritium container to drop by more during that period. The more tritium that is initially inserted in the container, the brighter it is to begin with, and the longer its useful life. This means the intensity of the tritium-powered light source will slowly fade, generally becoming too dim to be useful for dark adapted human eyes after 20 to 30 years.

== See also ==
- Lumibrite — different named strontium aluminate–based phosphorescent pigments
- Radium dial
