= Lumibrite =

Type of luminous paint

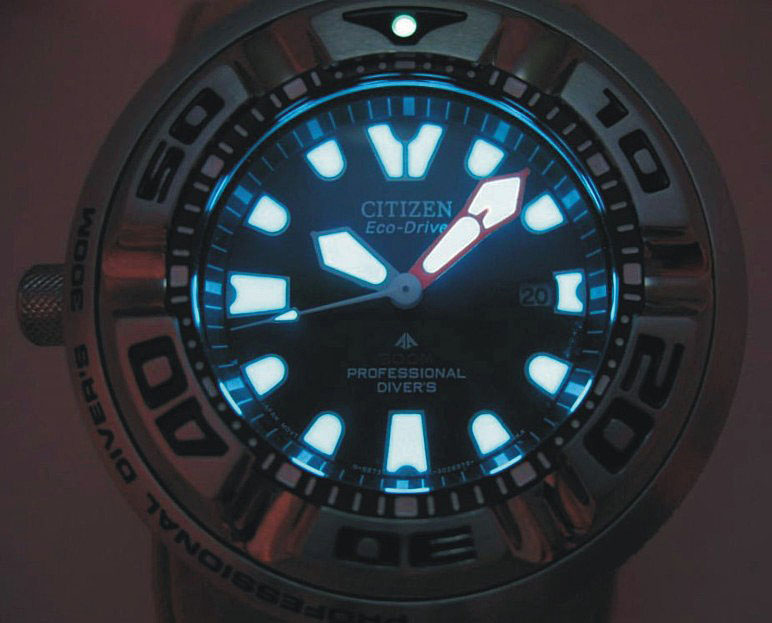
Lumibrite applied on a diving watch dial

Lumibrite is based on LumiNova branded pigments, invented in 1993 by the Nemoto & Co., Ltd. staff members Yoshihiko Murayama, Nobuyoshi Takeuchi, Yasumitsu Aoki and Takashi Matsuzawa as a safe replacement for radium-based luminous paints. The invention was patented in 1994 by Nemoto & Co., Ltd. and licensed to other manufacturers and watch brands that use different (brand) names.

These strontium aluminate–based phosphorescent pigments, often called lume, operate like a rechargeable light battery. After sufficient activation by sunlight, fluorescent, LED, UV (blacklight), incandescent and other light sources, they glow in the dark for hours. Electrons within the pigment are being "excited" by ultraviolet light exposure—the excitation wavelengths for strontium aluminate range from 200 to 450 nm electromagnetic radiation—to a higher energetic state and after the excitation source is removed, fall back to their normal energetic state by releasing the energy loss as visible light over a period of time. Although fading over time, appropriately thick applicated larger markings remain visible for dark adapted human eyes for the whole night. This Ultraviolet light exposure induced activation and subsequent light emission process can be repeated again and again.

This kind of luminescent pigment glows brighter for longer than the previous generation of luminescent pigment paints, and is environmentally friendly (non radioactive).

== See also ==
- Super-LumiNova — different branded strontium aluminate–based phosphorescent pigments
