= Strontium aluminate =

Chemical compound

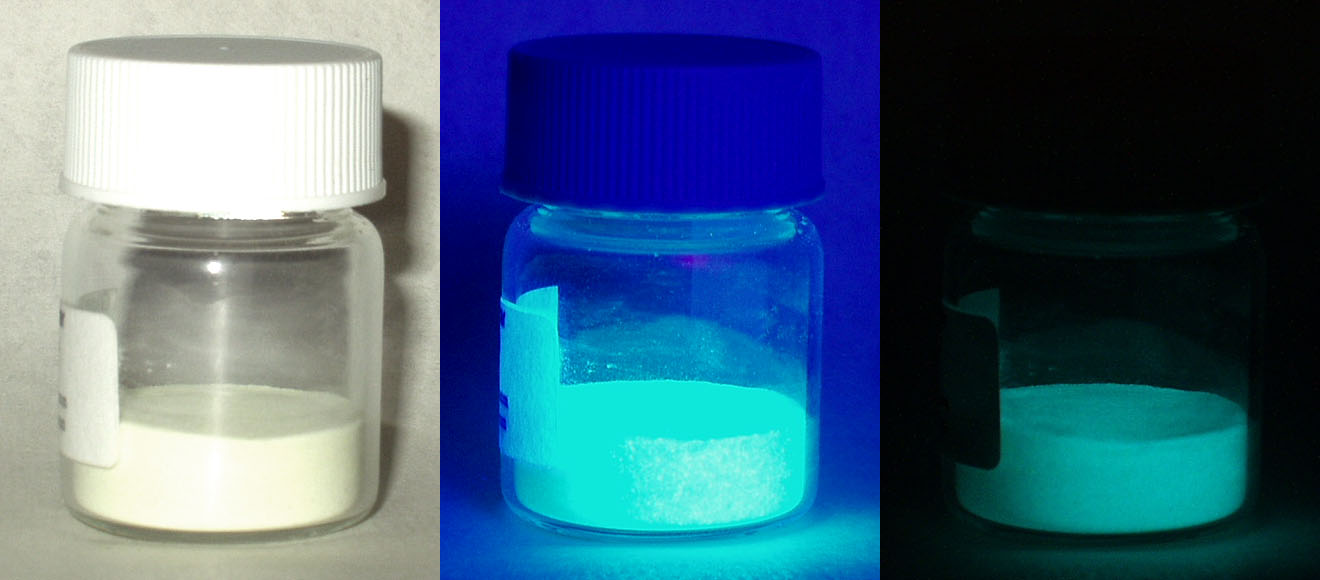
- Europium doped strontium silicate-aluminate oxide powder under visible light, long-wave UV light, and in total darkness.

Names
- IUPAC name Strontium aluminate

Identifiers
CAS Number	1:2:4: 12004-37-4; 1:12:19: 12254-24-9; 4:14:25: 76125-60-5
3D model (JSmol)	1:2:4: Interactive image; 2:2:5: Interactive image; 1:4:7: Interactive image; 3:2:6: Interactive image; 1:12:19: Interactive image; 4:14:25: Interactive image
ChemSpider	1:2:4: 8305977
ECHA InfoCard	100.031.310
EC Number	1:2:4: 234-455-3; 1:12:19: 235-498-0; 4:14:25: 278-377-8
PubChem CID	1:2:4: 10130461; 2:2:5: 165931; 1:12:19: 44146232; 4:14:25: 90475941
CompTox Dashboard (EPA)	1:2:4: DTXSID70892151
- InChI: 1:2:4: InChI=1S/2Al.4O.Sr/q2*+3;4*-2;+2 Key: NKGZELKYJQYVMY-UHFFFAOYSA-N; 2:2:5: InChI=1S/2Al.5O.2Sr/q2*+3;5*-2;2*+2 Key: FNWBQFMGIFLWII-UHFFFAOYSA-N; 1:12:19: InChI=1S/12Al.19O.Sr/q12*+3;19*-2;+2 Key: PLTZSNZQODUULH-UHFFFAOYSA-N; 4:14:25: InChI=1S/14Al.25O.4Sr/q14*+3;25*-2;4*+2 Key: DXUWOFILOWSWBV-UHFFFAOYSA-N
- SMILES: 1:2:4: [O-2].[O-2].[O-2].[O-2].[Al+3].[Al+3].[Sr+2]; 2:2:5: [O-2].[O-2].[O-2].[O-2].[O-2].[Al+3].[Al+3].[Sr+2].[Sr+2]; 1:4:7: [O-2].[O-2].[O-2].[O-2].[O-2].[O-2].[O-2].[Al+3].[Al+3].[Al+3].[Al+3].[Sr+2]; 3:2:6: [O-2].[O-2].[O-2].[O-2].[O-2].[O-2].[Al+3].[Al+3].[Sr+2].[Sr+2].[Sr+2]; 1:12:19: [O-2].[O-2].[O-2].[O-2].[O-2].[O-2].[O-2].[O-2].[O-2].[O-2].[O-2].[O-2].[O-2].[O-2].[O-2].[O-2].[O-2].[O-2].[O-2].[Al+3].[Al+3].[Al+3].[Al+3].[Al+3].[Al+3].[Al+3].[Al+3].[Al+3].[Al+3].[Al+3].[Al+3].[Sr+2]; 4:14:25: [O-2].[O-2].[O-2].[O-2].[O-2].[O-2].[O-2].[O-2].[O-2].[O-2].[O-2].[O-2].[O-2].[O-2].[O-2].[O-2].[O-2].[O-2].[O-2].[O-2].[O-2].[O-2].[O-2].[O-2].[O-2].[Al+3].[Al+3].[Al+3].[Al+3].[Al+3].[Al+3].[Al+3].[Al+3].[Al+3].[Al+3].[Al+3].[Al+3].[Al+3].[Al+3].[Sr+2].[Sr+2].[Sr+2].[Sr+2]

Properties
Chemical formula	SrAl_{2}O_{4}
Molar mass	205.58 g/mol
Appearance	Pale yellow powder
Density	3.559 g/cm^{3}

Structure
Crystal structure	Monoclinic
- Except where otherwise noted, data are given for materials in their standard state (at 25 °C [77 °F], 100 kPa). Infobox references

Strontium aluminate is an aluminate compound with the chemical formula SrAl_{2}O_{4} (sometimes written as SrO·Al_{2}O_{3}). It is a pale yellow, monoclinic crystalline powder that is odourless and non-flammable. When activated with a suitable dopant (e.g. europium, written as Eu:SrAl_{2}O_{4}), it acts as a photoluminescent phosphor with long persistence of phosphorescence.

Strontium aluminates exist in a variety of other compositions including SrAl_{4}O_{7} (monoclinic), Sr_{3}Al_{2}O_{6} (cubic), SrAl_{12}O_{19} (hexagonal), and Sr_{4}Al_{14}O_{25} (orthorhombic). The different compositions cause different colours of light to be emitted.

== History ==
Phosphorescent materials were discovered in the 1700s, and people have been studying them and making improvements over the centuries. The development of strontium aluminate pigments in 1993 was spurred on by the need to find a substitute for glow-in-the-dark materials with high luminance and long phosphorescence, especially those that used promethium. This led to the discovery by Yasumitsu Aoki (Nemoto & Co.) of materials with luminance approximately 10 times greater than zinc sulfide and phosphorescence approximately 10 times longer, and 10 times more expensive. The invention was patented by Nemoto & Co., Ltd. in 1994 and licensed to other manufacturers and watch brands. Strontium aluminates are now the longest lasting and brightest phosphorescent material commercially available.

For many phosphorescence-based purposes, strontium aluminate is a superior phosphor to its predecessor, copper-activated zinc sulfide, being about 10 times brighter and 10 times longer glowing. It is frequently used in glow in the dark objects, where it replaces the cheaper but less efficient Cu:ZnS that made 'glow in the dark stars' stickers glow.

Advancements in understanding of phosphorescent mechanisms, as well as advancements in molecular imaging, have enabled the development of novel, state-of-the-art strontium aluminates.

== Properties ==
Strontium aluminate phosphors produce green and aqua hues, where green gives the greatest brightness and aqua the longest glow time. Different aluminates can be used as the host matrix. This influences the wavelength of emission of the europium ion, by its covalent interaction with surrounding oxygens, and crystal field splitting of the 5d orbital energy levels.

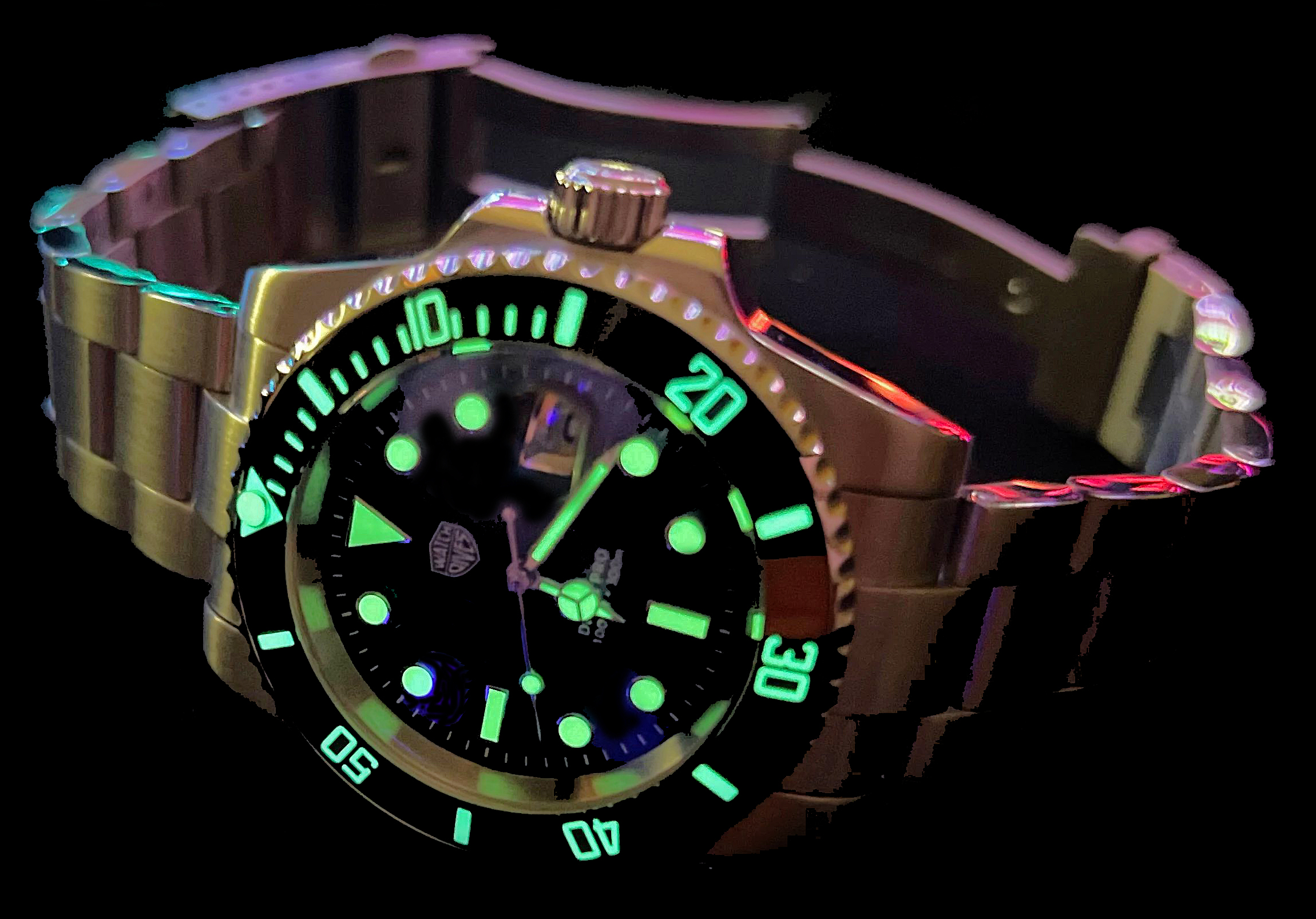
Green (emission at 515 nm) C3 Super-LumiNova applied on a diver's watch to make it readable in low light conditions.

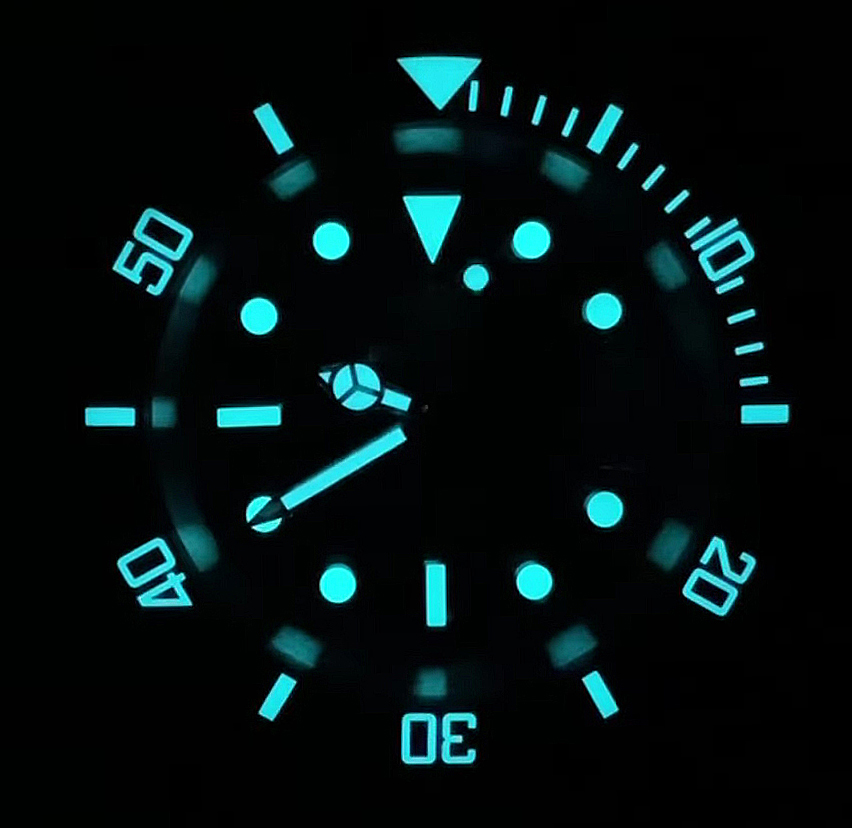
Blue-green (emission at 485 nm) BGW9 Super-LumiNova applied on a similar diver's watch face.

The excitation wavelengths for strontium aluminate range from 200 to 450 nm, and the emission wavelengths range from 420 to 520 nm. The wavelength for its green formulation is 520 nm, its aqua, or blue-green, version emits at 505 nm, and its blue emits at 490 nm. Strontium aluminate can be formulated to phosphoresce at longer (yellow to red) wavelengths as well, though such emission is often dimmer than that of more common phosphorescence at shorter wavelengths.

For europium-dysprosium doped aluminates, the peak emission wavelengths are 520 nm for SrAl_{2}O_{4}, 480 nm for SrAl_{4}O_{7}, and 400 nm for SrAl_{12}O_{19}.

Eu^{2+},Dy^{3+}:SrAl_{2}O_{4} is important as a persistently luminescent phosphor for industrial applications. It can be produced by molten salt assisted process at 900 °C.

The most described type is the stoichiometric green-emitting (approx. 530 nm) Eu^{2+}:SrAl_{2}O_{4}. Eu^{2+},Dy^{3+},B:SrAl_{2}O_{4} shows significantly longer afterglow than the europium-only doped material. The Eu^{2+} dopant shows high afterglow, while Eu^{3+} has almost none. Polycrystalline Mn:SrAl_{12}O_{19} is used as a green phosphor for plasma displays, and when doped with praseodymium or neodymium it can act as a good active laser medium. Sr_{0.95}Ce_{0.05}Mg_{0.05}Al_{11.95}O_{19} is a phosphor emitting at 305 nm, with quantum efficiency of 70%. Several strontium aluminates can be prepared by the sol-gel process.

The wavelengths produced depend on the internal crystal structure of the material. Slight modifications in the manufacturing process (the type of reducing atmosphere, small variations of stoichiometry of the reagents, addition of carbon or rare-earth halides) can significantly influence the emission wavelengths.

Strontium aluminate phosphor is usually fired at about 1250 °C, though higher temperatures are possible. Subsequent exposure to temperatures above 1090 °C is likely to cause loss of its phosphorescent properties. At higher firing temperatures, the Sr_{3}Al_{2}O_{6} undergoes transformation to SrAl_{2}O_{4}.

Cerium and manganese doped strontium aluminate (Ce,Mn:SrAl_{12}O_{19}) shows intense narrowband (22 nm wide) phosphorescence at 515 nm when excited by ultraviolet radiation (253.7 nm mercury emission line, to lesser degree 365 nm). It can be used as a phosphor in fluorescent lamps in photocopiers and other devices. A small amount of silicon substituting the aluminium can increase emission intensity by about 5%; the preferred composition of the phosphor is Ce_{0.15}Mn_{0.15}:SrAl_{11}Si_{0.75}O_{19}.

However, the material has high hardness, causing abrasion to the machinery used in processing it; manufacturers frequently coat the particles with a suitable lubricant when adding them to a plastic. Coating also prevents the phosphor from water degradation over time.

The glow intensity depends on the particle size; generally, the bigger the particles, the better the glow.

Strontium aluminate is insoluble in water and has an approximate pH of 8 (very slightly basic).

== Structural material ==
Strontium aluminate cement can be used as refractory structural material. It can be prepared by sintering of a blend of strontium oxide or strontium carbonate with alumina in a roughly equimolar ratio at about 1500 °C. It can be used as a cement for refractory concrete for temperatures up to 2000 °C as well as for radiation shielding. The use of strontium aluminate cements is limited by the availability of the raw materials.

Strontium aluminates have been examined as proposed materials for immobilization of fission products of radioactive waste, namely strontium-90. Europium-doped strontium aluminate nanoparticles are proposed as indicators of stress and cracks in materials, as they emit light when subjected to mechanical stress (mechanoluminescence). They are also useful for fabricating mechano-optical nanodevices. Non-agglomerated particles are needed for this purpose; they are difficult to prepare conventionally but can be made by ultrasonic spray pyrolysis of a mixture of strontium acetylacetonate, aluminium acetylacetonate and europium acetylacetonate in reducing atmosphere (argon with 5% of hydrogen).

== Industrial and commercial applications ==
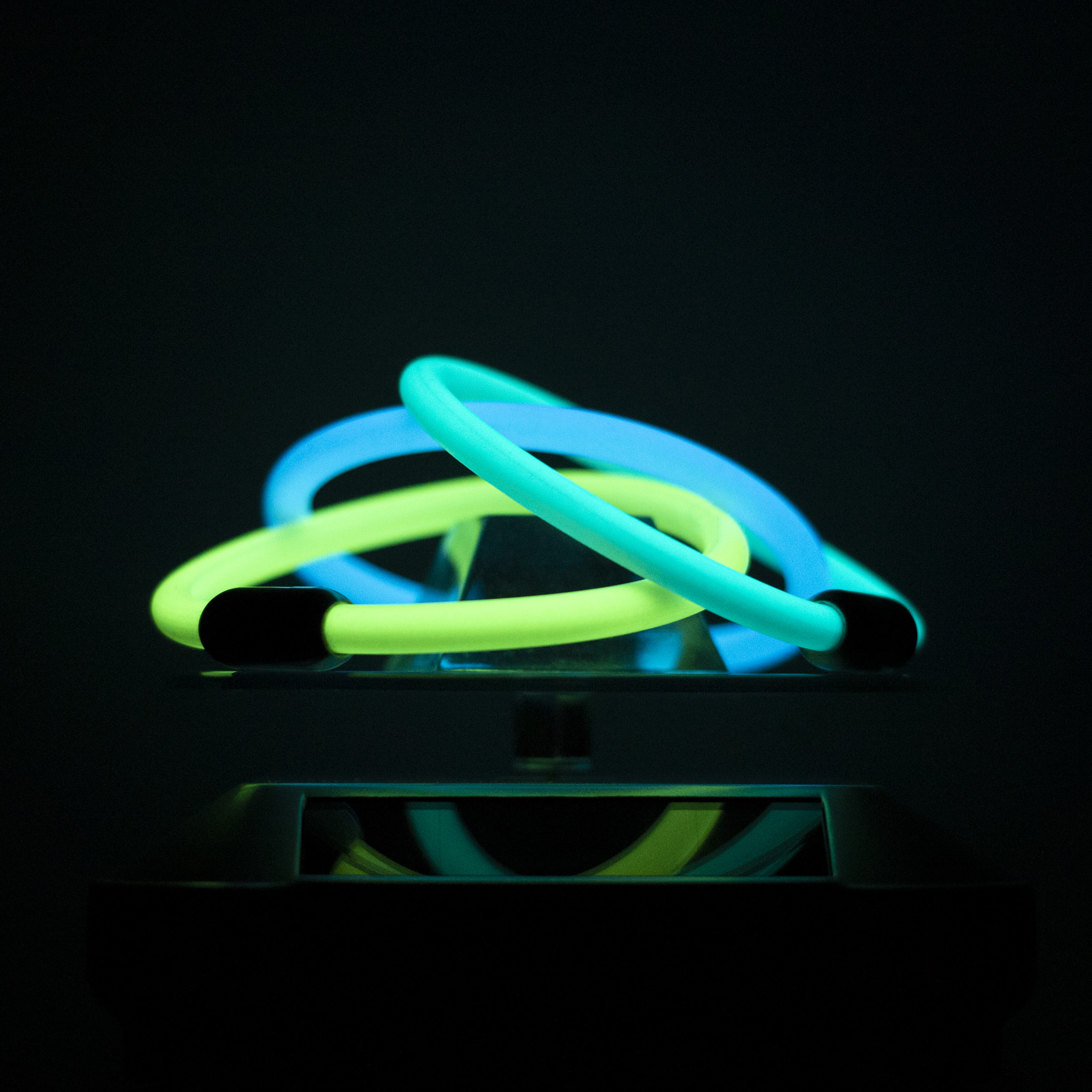
Reusable and non-toxic glow stick made from strontium aluminate particles mixed with a settable material. The different colours are made from slightly different strontium aluminate formulas.

Strontium aluminate based afterglow pigments are marketed under numerous brand names such as Core Glow, Super-LumiNova and Lumibrite, developed by Seiko.

Many companies additionally sell products that contain a mix of strontium aluminate particles and a 'host material'. Due to the nearly endless ability to recharge, strontium aluminate products cross many industries. Some of the most popular uses are for street lighting, such as the viral bike path.

Companies offer an industrial marble aggregate mixed with the strontium aluminate, to enable ease of using within standard construction processes. The glowing marble aggregates are often pressed into the cement or asphalt during the final stages of construction.

Reusable and non-toxic glow stick alternatives are now being developed using strontium aluminate particles.

Cubic strontium aluminate can be used as a water-soluble sacrificial layer for the production of free-standing films of complex oxide materials.

== Safety ==
Strontium aluminates are considered non-toxic, and are biologically and chemically inert.

Care should be used when handling loose powder, which can cause irritation if inhaled or exposed to mucous membranes.
