= California dial =

Style of clock face

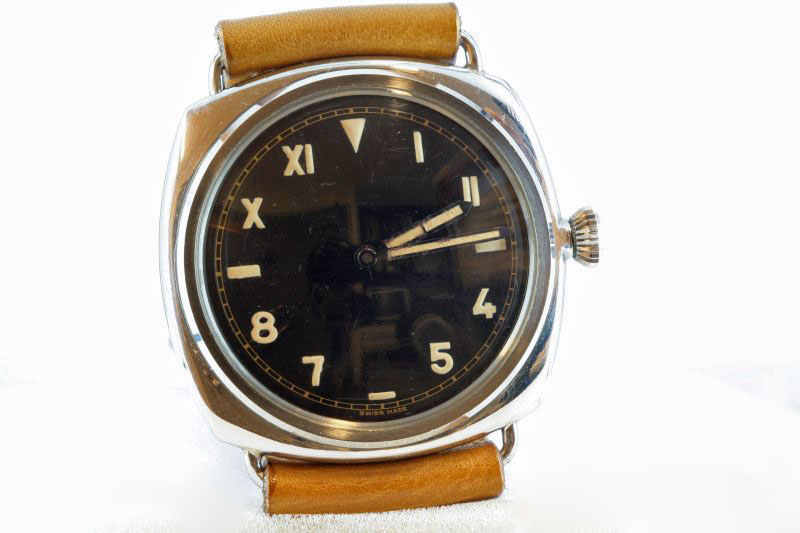
A California dial Panerai

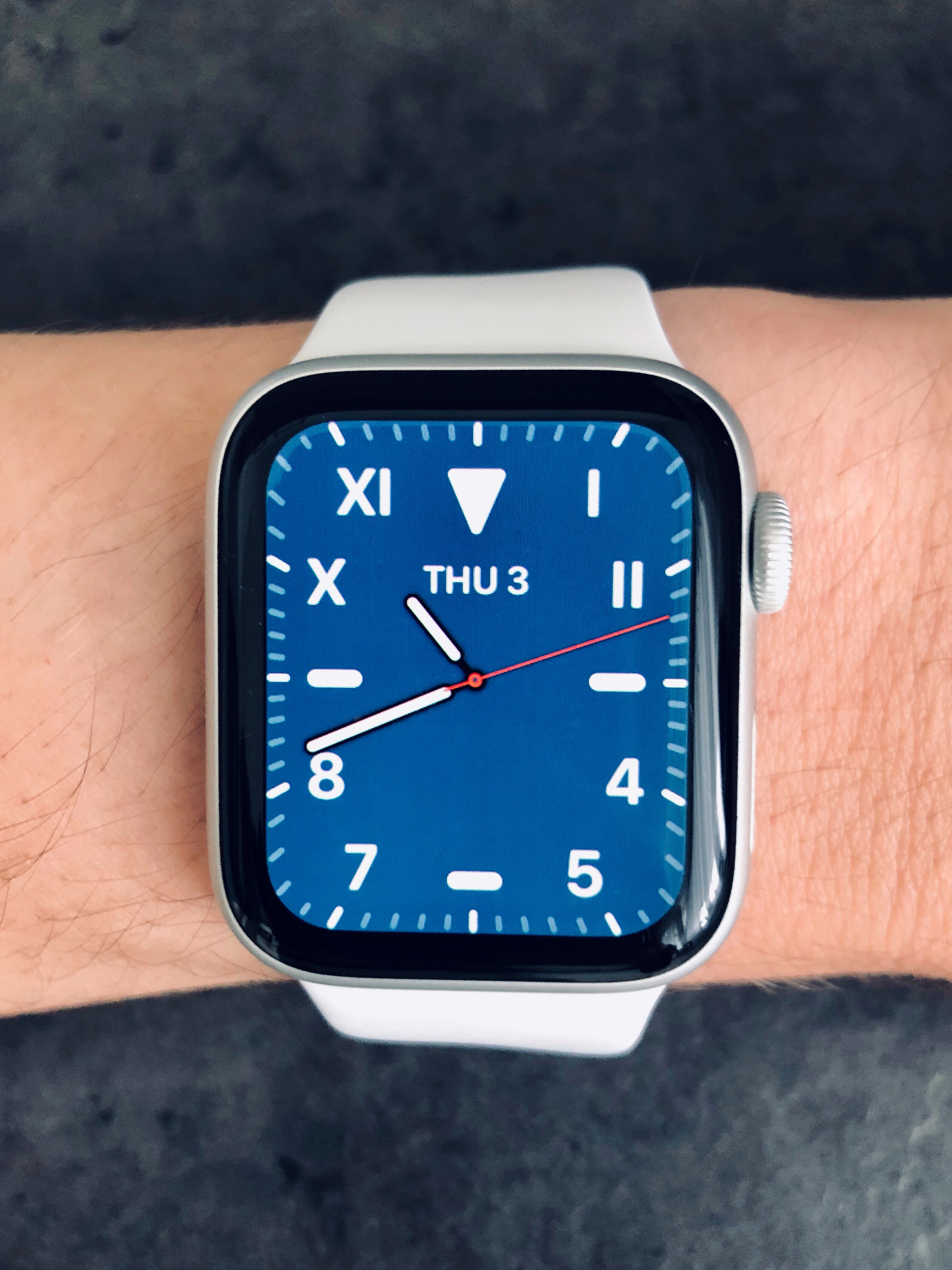
Apple Watch Series 4 with California dial

A California dial refers to a clock face that consists of half Roman (usually 10 o'clock to 2 o'clock) and half Arabic numerals (usually 4 o'clock to 8 o'clock). A dash is often used for hours 3, 6, and 9, and an inverted triangle for hour 12. The use of this style dates back to the 1930s, and was featured in early Rolex and Panerai watches. Originally called the “high visibility” or “error proof” dial, it was created during World War II to aid legibility in low-light combat conditions. After the war, the style faded away until it was popularized in the 1980s economic boom in Japan. Rolex could not keep up with demand, leading to a California-based company refurbishing Rolexes in the style, hence the name "California" dial.

Modern examples of the California dial include the Nomos Glashütte Club Campus, and the California watch face on the Apple Watch. The California Dial has also been used in collaborations between the Fears Watch Company and California based retailer Topper Jewelers. Their series II edition was inspired by geographical landmarks in Northern California.

== See also ==
- Clock dial
- 24-hour analog dial
