= Lume =

Luminous paint applied to watches

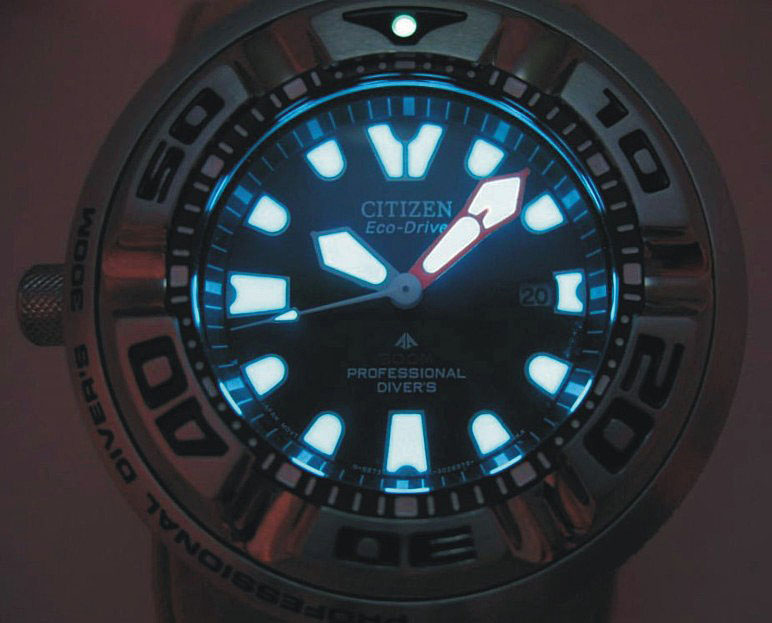
Lume applied on a diver's watch to make it readable in low light conditions.

Lume is a short term for the luminous phosphorescent glowing solution applied on watch dials. There are some people who "relume" watches, or replace faded lume. Formerly, lume consisted mostly of radium; however, radium is radioactive and has been mostly replaced on new watches by less bright, but less toxic compounds. After radium was effectively outlawed in 1968, tritium became the luminescent material of choice, because, while still radioactive, it is much less potent than radium, tritium being about as radioactive as an x-ray, the decrease in radioactivity resulting from a diminishment of strength and quantity of the beta waves that are given off by tritium as an element.

Common pigments used in lume include the phosphorescent pigments zinc sulfide and strontium aluminate. Use of zinc sulfide for safety related products dates back to the 1930s. However, the development of strontium oxide aluminate, with a luminance approximately 10 times greater than zinc sulfide, has relegated most zinc sulfide based products to the novelty category. Strontium oxide aluminate based pigments are now used in exit signs, pathway marking, and other safety related signage.

Strontium aluminate based afterglow pigments are marketed under brandnames like Super-LumiNova, Watchlume Co, NoctiLumina, and Glow in the Dark (Phosphorescent) Technologies.
