= Activator (phosphor) =

In phosphors and scintillators, the activator is the element added as dopant to the crystal of the material to create desired type of nonhomogeneities.

In luminescence, only a small fraction of atoms, called emission centers or luminescence centers, emit light. In inorganic phosphors, these inhomogeneities in the crystal structure are created usually by addition of a trace amount of dopants, impurities called activators. (In rare cases dislocations or other crystal defects can play the role of the impurity.) The wavelength emitted by the emission center is dependent on the atom itself, its electronic configuration, and on the surrounding crystal structure.

The activators prolong the emission time (afterglow). In turn, other materials (such as nickel) can be used to quench the afterglow and shorten the decay part of the phosphor emission characteristics.

The electronic configuration of the activator depends on its oxidation state and is crucial for the light emission. Oxidation of the activator is one of the common mechanisms of phosphor degradation. The distribution of the activator in the crystal is also of high importance. Diffusion of the ions can cause depletion of the crystal from the activators with resulting loss of efficiency. This is another mechanism of phosphor degradation.

The scintillation process in inorganic materials is due to the electronic band structure found in the crystals. An incoming particle can excite an electron from the valence band to either the conduction band or the exciton band (located just below the conduction band and separated from the valence band by an energy gap). This leaves an associated hole behind, in the valence band. Impurities create electronic levels in the forbidden gap. The excitons are loosely bound electron-hole pairs which wander through the crystal lattice until they are captured as a whole by impurity centers. The latter then rapidly de-excite by emitting scintillation light (fast component). In case of inorganic scintillators, the activator impurities are typically chosen so that the emitted light is in the visible range or near-UV where photomultipliers are effective. The holes associated with electrons in the conduction band are independent from the latter. Those holes and electrons are captured successively by impurity centers exciting certain metastable states not accessible to the excitons. The delayed de-excitation of those metastable impurity states, slowed by reliance on the low-probability forbidden mechanism, again results in light emission (slow component).

The activator is the main factor determining the phosphor emission wavelength. The nature of the host crystal can however to some degree influence the wavelength as well.

More activators can be used simultaneously.

Common examples of activators are:

- Copper, added in concentration of 5 ppm to copper-activated zinc sulfide, used in glow in the dark materials and green CRT phosphors; long afterglow
- Silver, added to zinc sulfide to produce a phosphor/scintillator used in radium dials, spinthariscopes, and as a common blue phosphor in color CRTs, and to zinc sulfide-cadmium sulfide used as a phosphor in black-and-white CRTs (where the ZnS/(Zn,Cd)S ratio determines the blue/yellow balance of the resulting white); short afterglow
- Europium(II), added to strontium aluminate, used in high-performance glow in the dark materials, very long afterglow; with other host materials it is frequently used as the red emitter in color CRTs and fluorescent lights.
- Cerium, added to yttrium aluminium garnet used in white light emitting diodes, excited by blue light and emitting yellow
- Thallium, used in sodium iodide and caesium iodide scintillator crystals for detection of gamma radiation and for gamma spectroscopy

A newly discovered activator is Samarium(II), added to calcium fluoride. Sm(II) is one of the few materials reported which offers efficient scintillation in the red region of the spectrum, particularly when cooled by dry ice.
