= Panerai =

Italian luxury watch manufacturer

- Type: Subsidiary
- Industry: Manufacturing
- Founded: 1860; 166 years ago in Florence, Tuscany, Italy
- Founder: Giovanni Panerai
- Headquarters: Geneva, Switzerland
- Area served: Worldwide
- Key people: Emmanuel Perrin CEO, Olivier BertoinFinance Director
- Products: Luxury watches
- Number of employees: 740
- Parent: Richemont
- Website: www.panerai.com

Officine Panerai (also known simply as Panerai) is a Swiss luxury watch manufacturer based in Geneva, Switzerland., and a wholly owned subsidiary of Compagnie Financière Richemont S.A.

Officine Panerai designs, manufactures and markets watches through authorized dealers and company-owned stores worldwide. Giovanni Panerai (1825–1897) founded Officine Panerai in Florence, Italy in 1860.

The company is headquartered in Geneva and manufactures watches in Neuchâtel, Switzerland using movements manufactured by Manufacture Horlogère ValFleurier.

== History ==
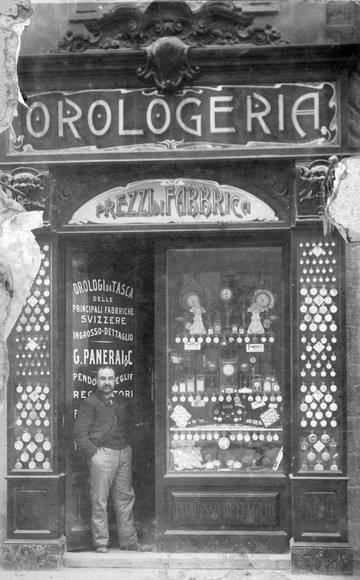
Employee of Panerai in front of the watch store in Florence in 1860

Giovanni Panerai (1825–1897) opened up his first watch shop in Florence, Italy in 1860. Giovanni's grandson Guido Panerai (1873–1934) expanded the watch shop "Orologeria Svizzera" and took over his wife's family business, a mechanical workshop. In 1915, Guido Panerai invented gun sights that were illuminated by a radium-226/zinc sulfide powder enclosed in small, hermetically sealed vessels. Radiomir, the name for the radium-based luminous mixture is derived from "radio mire", which is Italian for "radium sights". Panerai became an official supplier to the Regia Marina (the Royal Italian Navy), supplying a variety of technical equipment and precision instruments. All Panerai watches, except for the GPF 2/56 were designed and manufactured by Rolex SA using pocket watch movements made by Swiss manufacturer Cortébert. The main driving forces behind the production of the first professional diving watches were Hans Wilsdorf of Rolex and Giuseppe Panerai.

The Florence-based workshop produced wrist-worn diving instruments and, between 1935 and 1970, delivered around 1,600 watches (c. 35 2533s, 1000 3646s, 24 6152s, 36 6154s, 500 6152/1s, and 60 GPF 2/56s), most of them to the Italian Marina Militare. All watches, except for the GPF 2/56, were made by Rolex, and G. Panerai e Figlio produced only the dials for these watches. Panerai dials were rendered luminous with Radiomir, a highly radioactive radium-based self-luminous compound, and later in around 1965, with Luminor, a harmless compound activated by tritium.

The GPF 2/56 (Egiziano Grosso) was produced for the Egyptian Navy in 1956. By 1970, the company ceased to provide watches to the Marina Militare, as they were neither cost-effective nor met the naval specifications. In 1993, it then moved to launch its products in the civilian market. Following its acquisition of Panerai, Richemont repositioned Panerai as a luxury watch brand and increased prices.

== Products ==
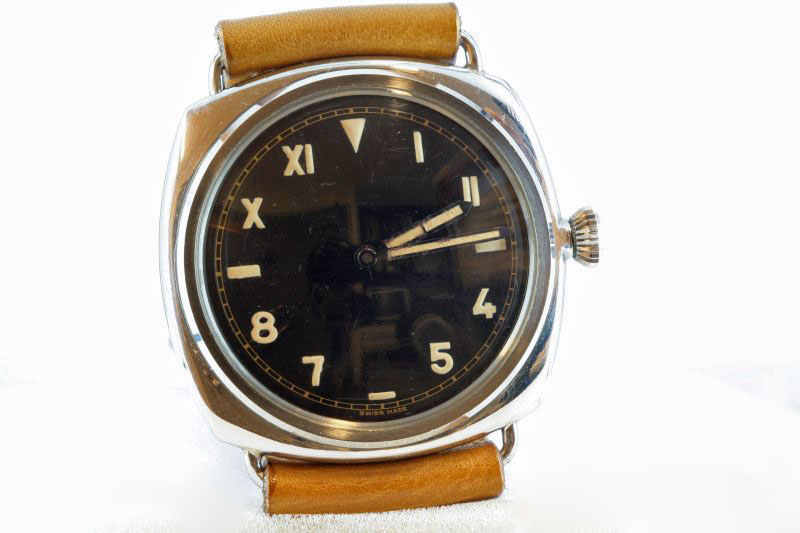
Ref. 3646 from 1944 with Rolex "California" dial

Panerai offers watches across four marketing lines: Historic, Contemporary, Manifattura and Special Editions in runs of 500, 1000, 2,000 or 4,000 units; each with its issue number on the case back. The company issues Special Editions by year. For example, in 2006 issued the 1936 California Dial Radiomir special edition, a reissue of the first Panerai model presented to the Italian Marina Militare with production limited to 1936 units.

When Ferrari's contract with watchmaker Girard-Perregaux expired in 2005, Ferrari and Panerai entered into a five-year agreement to design, manufacture and distribute Panerai watches carrying the Ferrari trademark. The collection was branded Ferrari engineered by Panerai and consisted of two product lines marketed as "Granturismo" and "Scuderia". The collection consisted of 11 models priced between US$5,000 and US$30,000. The Panerai-Ferrari partnership ended in 2010.

== Clientele ==
Panerai watches have appeared on the wrist of multiple celebrities, politicians and other influential individuals, notably Sylvester Stallone who wore a Luminor model in the 1996 film, Daylight, American football player Peyton Manning, former President of the United States Bill Clinton, and English actor Hugh Grant.

== Models ==
- Panerai Luminor
- Panerai Luminor 1950
- Panerai Radiomir
- Panerai Radiomir 1940
- Panerai Luminor Due
- Panerai Ferrari
- Panerai Luminor Submersible 1950

== See also ==
- List of Italian companies
