= Rolex Oyster Perpetual =

Rolex automatic wristwatch model

- The Rolex Oyster Perpetual ref. 277200 with a Lavender dial
- Manufacturer: Rolex
- Type: Automatic
- Display: Analogue
- Introduced: 1931

The Rolex Oyster Perpetual is an automatic and waterproof line of wristwatches manufactured by Rolex.

The terms 'Oyster' and 'Perpetual' are also used as designations across the Rolex model line.

== History ==
In 1926, Rolex founder, Hans Wilsdorf, acquired the patent for a screwed down crown, making the crown itself waterproof. Later that year, the company released the Rolex Oyster, its first waterproof watch, featuring a sealed case with the bezel and case back helping to secure the middle of the case. It was named after an oyster, to highlight its water resistance.

“The fact that, like an oyster, it can remain an unlimited time under water without detriment to its parts, gave me the idea of christening it the ‘Rolex Oyster'" - Hans Wilsdorf

In 1931, Rolex introduced the Oyster Perpetual which utilised an automatic movement, christened the 'perpetual' reflecting that it did not need to be manually wound.

Since the introduction of the Rolex Explorer, the term 'Oyster Perpetual' has been used both as a designation of waterproof, 'oyster' cases and automatic movements in other Rolex model lines including the Submariner and GMT Master II. For example, the Air-King features the words 'Rolex Oyster Perpetual' in the top half of the dial.

=== Distinct model line ===
In 2014, Rolex re-introduced the Oyster Perpetual as a distinct model line.

== Variants ==
=== Oysterdate ===
In 1951, Rolex began to produce the Oyster Perpetual – Date, which featured the cal. 1035 which was also used in contemporary Submariner and GMT Master models.

=== 100th Anniversary model ===
In 2026, to celebrate the 100th anniversary of the Oyster line, Rolex released a 41-mm, Rolesor anniversary variant of the Oyster Perpetual.
