= Rolex Datejust =

Wristwatch manufactured by Rolex

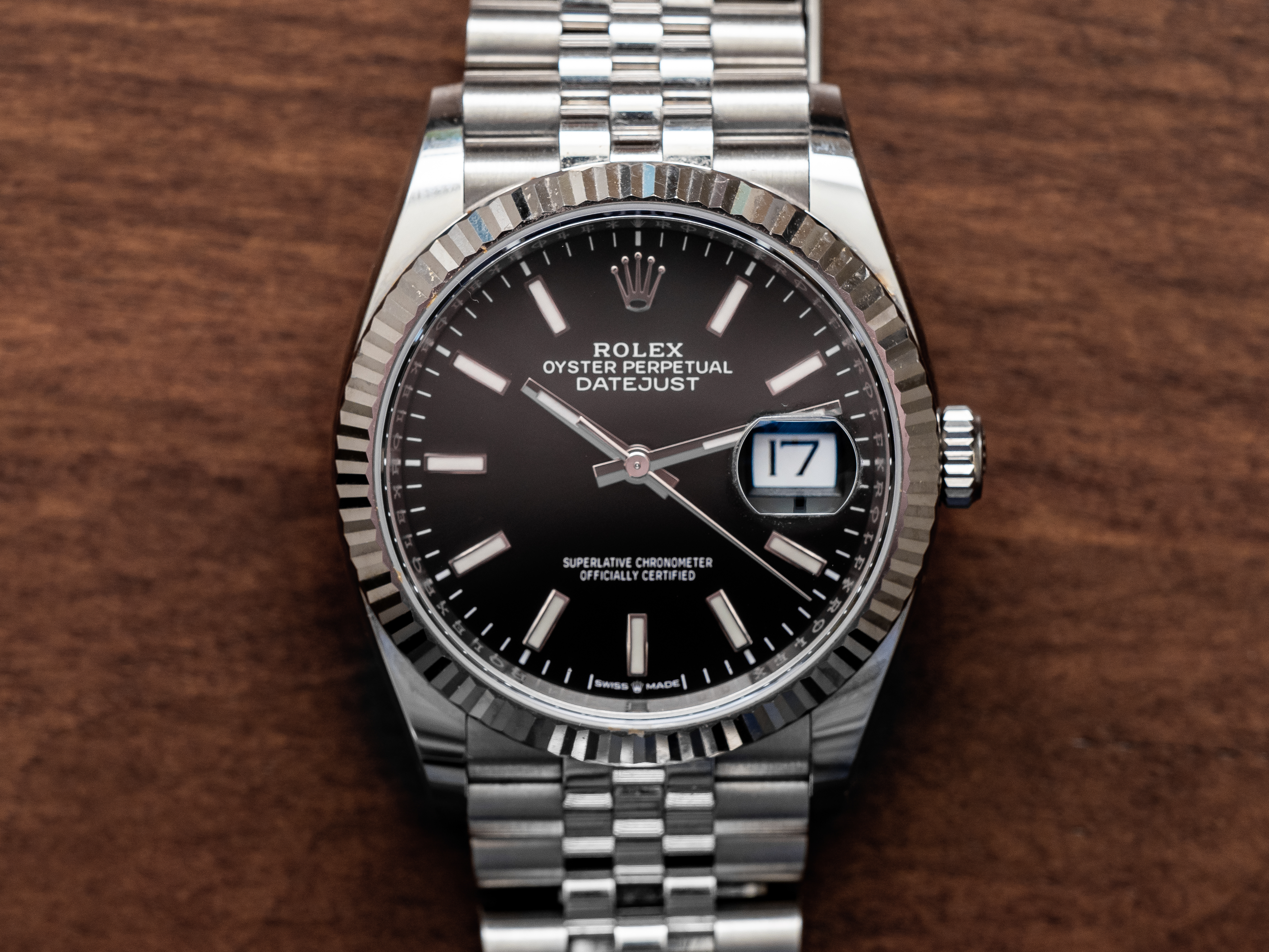
- The Rolex Datejust ref. 126234 with a black dial, fluted bezel and Jubilee bracelet
- Manufacturer: Rolex
- Type: Automatic
- Display: Analogue
- Introduced: 1945

The Rolex Oyster Perpetual Datejust is a self-winding chronometer manufactured by Rolex. Launched in 1945, the Datejust was the first self-winding chronometer wristwatch to indicate the date in a window on the dial. Today, it is available in a variety of sizes from 28mm to 41mm, in stainless steel, two-tone gold, and solid gold versions.

== History ==
Rolex introduced the original Datejust (reference 4467) in 1945 to celebrate the company's 40th anniversary. It was available only in 18 karat yellow gold and had a small bubble back winder with a domed back. It also featured the company's waterproof Oyster case (first introduced in 1926), a fluted bezel, and the new Jubilee bracelet (so named for the occasion).

Over the years, the Datejust saw an expansion of its design options as well as improvements to its movement, from a gradual date change shortly before midnight in the earliest versions to an instantaneous change beginning in 1955. The same date change mechanics and 'Datejust' naming was also used in the Rolex Oysterquartz range.

The Datejust is offered with two Rolex bracelets: the Jubilee and the Oyster. The original Datejust was launched with a case size of 36mm. Subsequently, various sizes including ladies' and mid-sized versions were made available.

=== Turn-O-Graph ===
In 1953, Rolex briefly introduced the Monomoter, a Datejust variant featuring a rotating bezel marked to 60 minutes. Within months, the name was changed to 'Turn-O-Graph', the first Rolex with a rotating bezel. This watch would form the basis for the Rolex Explorer (designed for Sir Edmund Hillary's Mount Everest expedition), the Rolex Submariner, and the Rolex Sea-Dweller. It was issued by the US Air Force's Thunderbird Aerobatic team, earning it the nickname 'Thunderbird'.

=== Datejust II ===
In 2009, the Rolex Oyster Perpetual Datejust II was released. At 41mm in diameter (excluding the crown) its case is bigger than the original Datejust.

In 2016, the Rolex Oyster Perpetual Datejust 41 was released. The watch comes in stainless steel, and two-tone stainless steel and 18k yellow or 18k everose gold (Rolex's version of rose gold) bracelets. The 2016 41mm Datejust is on an Oyster or Jubilee bracelet. While the Datejust 41 has a similar-sized 41mm diameter case as the Datejust II, the Datejust 41 has smaller indexes and a thinner bezel compared to the Datejust II.

In this year, Rolex also introduced the new Caliber 3235 movement, which replaces more than 90% of the parts of its predecessor, the Caliber 3135 - Rolex's longest running and most successful movement. Caliber 3235 includes a new escapement, the Chronergy, along with other significant improvements, and provides a 70-hour power reserve while maintaining the same dimensions as its predecessor.

At Baselworld 2015, Rolex announced that the Lady-Datejust 26mm would be replaced by a newer 28mm variant, with a new Caliber 2236 movement, refined lugs and middle case, a broad and clear dial, as well as a President or Jubilee bracelet integrated into the Oyster case.

As of 2019, the Datejust lineup consists of the following sizes: 28mm, 31mm, 34mm, 36mm, 41mm - which come in either full stainless steel, two-tone gold (yellow, Everose or white) and stainless steel, or solid gold (yellow, Everose and white) case and bracelet.

== In popular culture ==
In the book version of American Psycho, Patrick Bateman owns an unspecified Rolex. In the movie version, Bateman (played by Christian Bale) wears a two-tone Seiko 5 that resembles a Rolex Datejust, as Rolex did not want to be associated with the character.

In The Informers some of the cast wear Datejust watches.

Paul Newman wears a full stainless steel 36mm Datejust in The Color of Money.

Harrison Ford sports a Datejust 36mm in the 1980s movie Frantic, which featured a white Roman numeral dial, white gold bezel and stainless steel jubilee bracelet and case.

Bill Murray's character wears a Datejust with a black dial in Lost in Translation.

Matthew McConaughey's character in The Wolf of Wall Street wears a 90's Rolesor (two-toned stainless steel and gold) Datejust.

Edie Falco consistently wears a 90s-era women's Datejust in her role as Carmela throughout the run of The Sopranos.

== See also ==
- Patek Philippe Calatrava
- Rolex Day-Date
- Rolex Daytona
- Rolex GMT Master II
- Rolex Milgauss
- Rolex Sea Dweller
- Rolex Submariner
- Rolex Yacht-Master
- Rolex Explorer II
