= Rolex Day-Date =

COSC certified, self-winding chronometer manufactured by Rolex

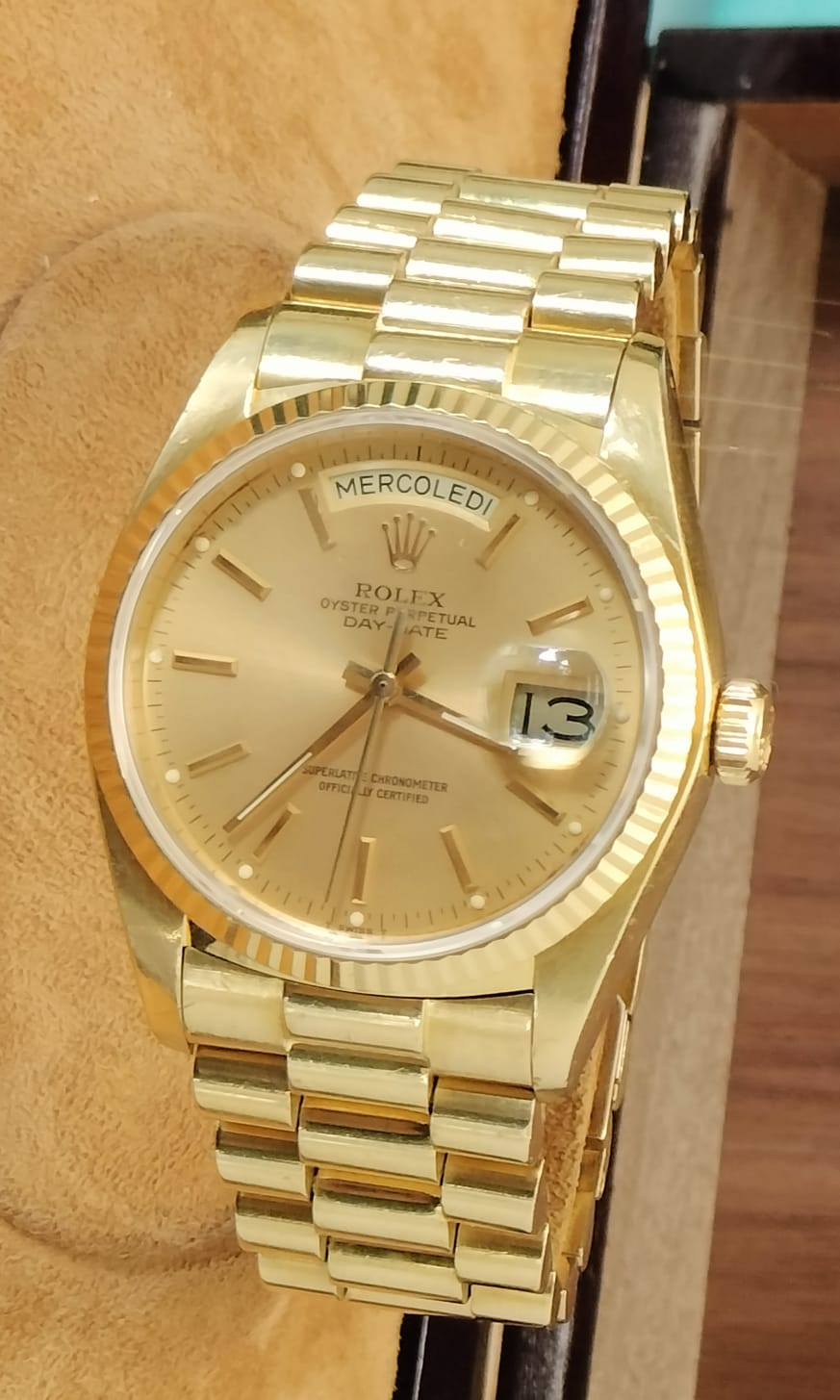
- The Rolex Day-Date ref. 1803 produced from 1959 until 1977.
- Manufacturer: Rolex
- Type: Automatic
- Display: Analog
- Introduced: 1956

The Rolex Oyster Perpetual Day-Date is a COSC certified, self-winding chronometer manufactured by Rolex. Initially presented in 1956, the Day-Date was the first watch to display the date as well as the day of the week, spelled in full.

== History ==
Rolex introduced the Day-Date at the Swiss Industries Fair Basel in 1956. Intended to be the brand's flagship model, the Ref.6511 was available only in 18ct gold, or platinum. The model also featured a new bracelet configuration, exclusive to the model, featuring three rounded links across the width of the band.

In 1965, President Lyndon B. Johnson became the first president to wear a gold Day-Date. Whilst Rolex took advantage of this connection for advertising purposes, first running an advert calling it 'The Presidents' Watch', it had also previously referred to the bracelet style as the 'President Bracelet', as early as 1957.

== Variants ==
=== Stella Dial ===
A variant of the Day-Date called the "Lacquered Stella" (now more commonly known as "Stella") was introduced to Middle Eastern and Asian markets in the 1970s. The Stella featured vivid, bright color dials and was rumored to be named after the American painter Frank Stella. A gold with yellow lacquered Stella sold at Christie's for $131,250 in 2019.

The Stella model with 18k gold and yellow lacquered dial is considered one of the rarest, with one selling at Christie's for US$131,250 in 2019, with another selling for 275,000 Swiss Francs (approximately US$300,000) at Phillips. Other models with different dial color and band combinations have been sold for over CHF50,000.

In 2013, Rolex released a new Day-Date with vividly colored leather straps and matching colored dials. that Rolex enthusiasts also dubbed "Stella".

=== Stainless steel ===
Whilst the Day-Date has been offered in only gold and platinum throughout its production, six of the Ref. 6611 were made in stainless steel and offered as prizes to students of the Geneva school of Horology.

=== Day-Date II ===
In 2008, Rolex introduced the Day-Date II in 41mm. This was retired in 2015, and Rolex instead offered the model in both 36mm and 40mm sizes.

Today, the Day-Date is available in 26 different languages English, Spanish, Dutch, Indonesian, Italian, Japanese, Latin, Arabic, German, Polish, Portuguese, Russian, Chinese, Danish, Basque, Catalan, Ethiopian, Finnish, French, Greek, Hebrew, Moroccan, Norwegian, Persian, Swedish and Turkish.

== Notable wearers ==
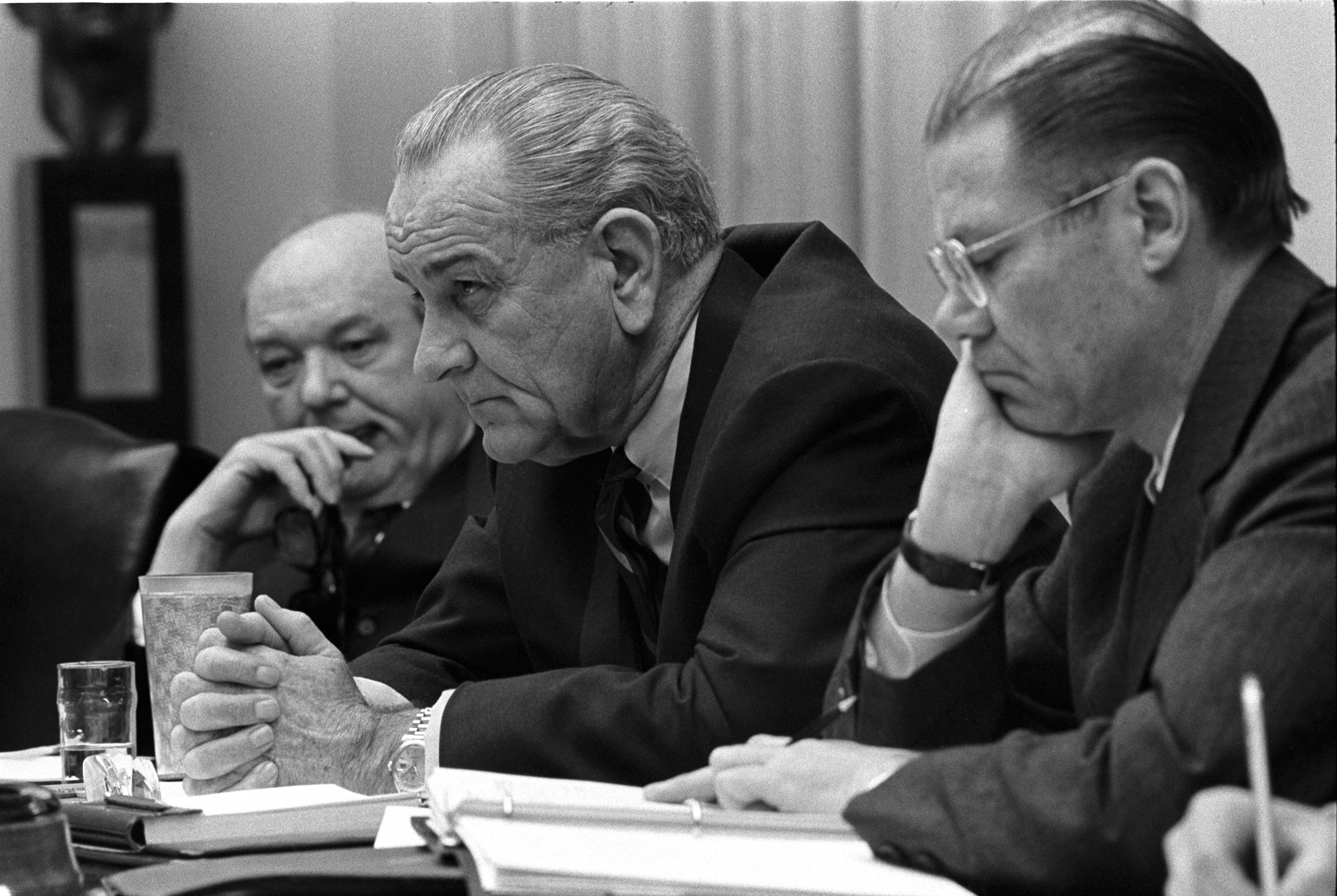
36th President of the United States, Lyndon Johnson, shown wearing his Rolex Day-Date in 1968

- John F. Kennedy, 35th President of the United States; gifted a yellow gold Day-Date by his alleged mistress Marilyn Monroe for his birthday in 1962, engraved with the message "JACK / With love as always / from / MARILYN / May 29th 1962." This same birthday was where she performed Happy Birthday, Mr. President. The watch was never worn by Kennedy
- Lyndon B. Johnson, 36th President of the United States
- Richard Nixon, 37th President of the United States
- Gerald Ford, 38th President of the United States
- Ronald Reagan, 40th President of the United States
- Donald Trump, 45th President of the United States
- J. R. Ewing, American billionaire and owner of Ewing Oil
- Warren Buffett, American billionaire investor
- Michael Jordan, American professional basketball player
- LeBron James, American professional basketball player
- Kevin Love, American professional basketball player
- Carmelo Anthony, American professional basketball player
- Jack Nicklaus, American professional golfer
- Tenzin Gytaso, 14th Dalai Lama
- Emeril Lagasse, American celebrity chef

== Related pages ==
- Rolex Daytona
- Rolex Datejust
- Rolex GMT Master II
- Rolex Milgauss
- Rolex Sea Dweller
- Rolex Submariner
- Rolex Yacht-Master
- Rolex Explorer II
