= Rolex Air-King =

Rolex aviation-themed wristwatch model

Rolex Explorer
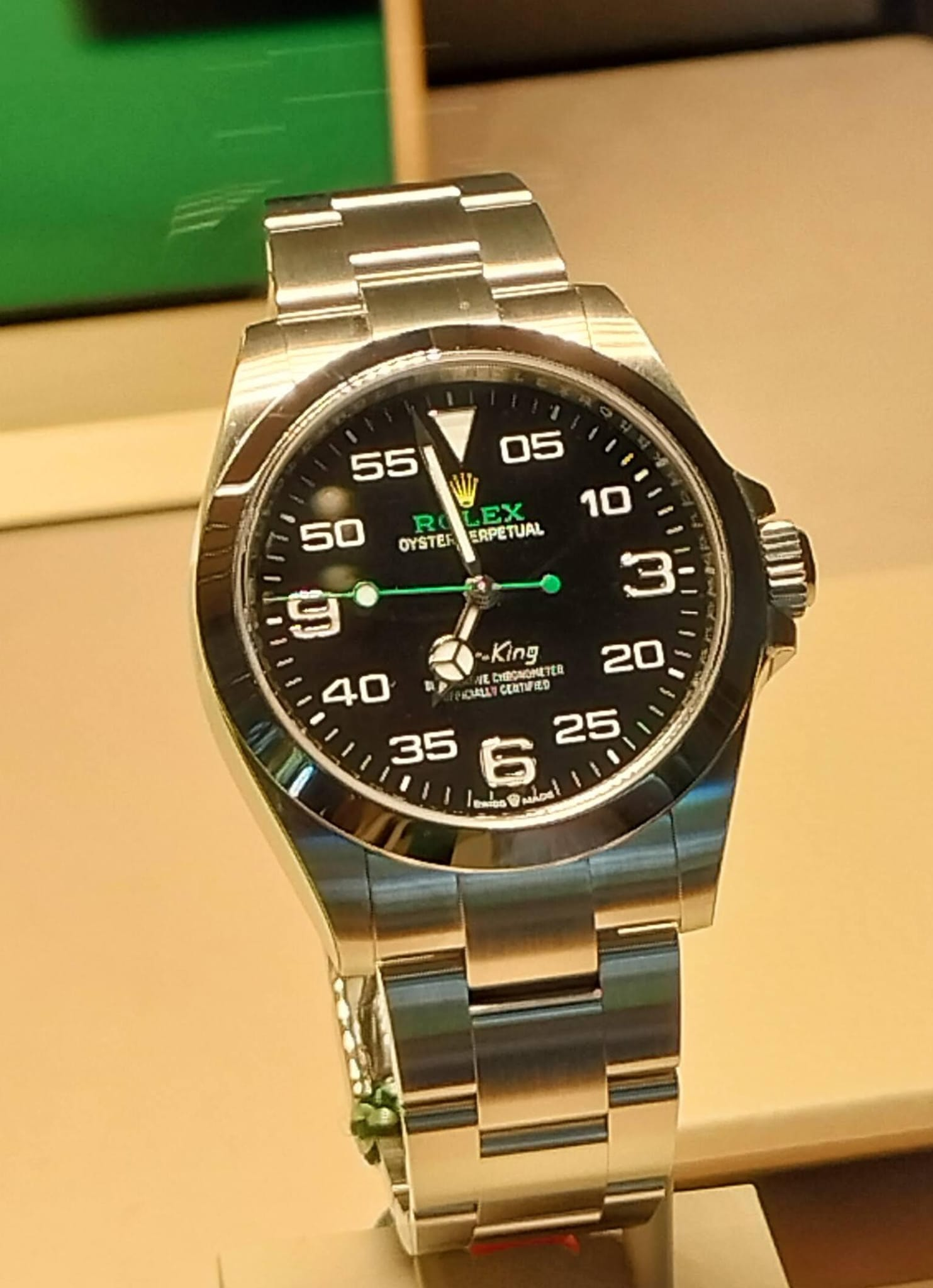
- The Rolex Air-King ref. 126900 in production from 2022
- Manufacturer: Rolex
- Type: Automatic
- Display: Analogue
- Introduced: 1945

The Rolex Air-King is a line of self-winding mechanical watches produced by Rolex. Introduced in 1945, the Air-King was developed as part of Rolex's post-war aviation themed watches and became the only model from that series to remain in production.

== History ==
Rolex watches were valued by members of the Royal Air Force during World War II, with many opting to privately purchase the watches which were not standard commission to pilots. To recognise and capitalise on their popularity, Rolex founder, Hans Wildorf, instructed the creation of a series of 'Air' models which prioritised legibility.

The original series included the Air-King, alongside the Air Lion, Air Tiger, and Air Giant. Whilst these models were slowly dropped from the catalogue, the Air-King has remained in near continuous production since, with only a short break from 2014 to 2018

=== Bloodhound SSC ===
In 2018, Rolex re-introduced the Air-King model. Unlike previous versions which had been 34mm or smaller, the 116900 Air-King was 40mm in diameter and shared a case with the then current Rolex Milgauss.

The dial was designed as an homage to the chronograph counter Rolex had designed and manufactured for the Bloodhound SSC, a vehicle designed to break the world land speed record, as their official timing partner.

== Variants ==
The Air-King 5500 was sold by the NAAFI featuring an 'Explorer' name on the dial, instead of 'Air-King', although this is considered a distinct model from the Rolex Explorer.

From 1977, until the early 2000s, Dominos rewarded franchise owners with Air-Kings which featured either engravings or special dials which featured the company's logo.

== See also ==
- Pilot watch
