= Rolex Explorer II =

Self-winding Swiss made wristwatch

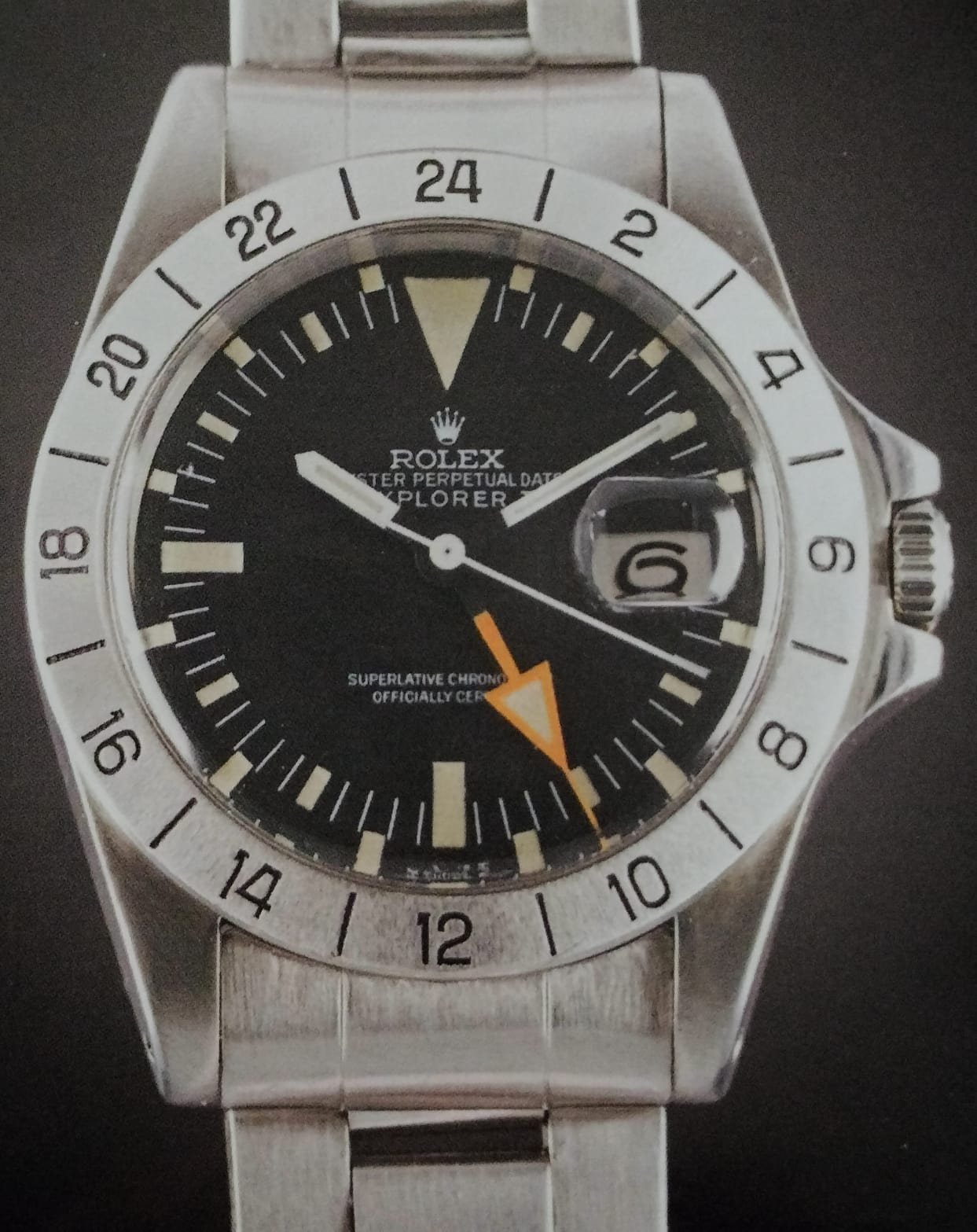
- Rolex Explorer ref.1655
- Type: Automatic
- Display: Analogue
- Introduced: 1971

Rolex Explorer II is a self-winding Swiss made wristwatch introduced by Rolex in 1971. The watch was originally intended to be a tool watch for speleologists. The fixed 24-hr bezel and bright red arrow hand (some Explorer II models also have a bright orange arrow head) were designed to keep track of day and night while caving.

The Explorer line originated in honor of Sir Edmund Hillary's successful ascent of Mount Everest in 1953. The Rolex Explorer is part of Rolex's Professional line.

== History ==
Rolex unveiled the first generation of the Explorer II, the reference 1655, in 1971 as an addition to the existing Explorer line. Like the GMT Master, it featured an extra hand which rotated every 24 hours, acting as an AM-PM indicator to aid cave explorers.

In 1985, Rolex introduced the 16550 reference which featured an adjustable independent 24 hour hand, along with a white face option.

The most recent reference, the Ref. 226570, features Rolex's cal. 3285, which is also used in the modern GMT Master II.

== Notable wearers ==
The original reference of the Explorer II is nicknamed the 'Steve McQueen', although there is little evidence that McQueen himself wore one; he preferred Rolex's Submariner.

Prince Harry, the younger son of King Charles III, owns a white dialled version of the Explorer II, and wore it during his tours of service in Afghanistan.

The American professional climber, Alex Honnold, wore a black-dialled version of the model whilst climbing Taipei 101, a 1,667ft skyscraper in Taiwain without safety equipment, rope or harness, in 2026.

== See also ==
- Rolex Daytona
- Rolex Day-Date
- Rolex Datejust
- Rolex GMT Master II
- Rolex Milgauss
- Rolex Sea-Dweller
- Rolex Submariner
- Rolex Yacht-Master
