= Rolex Sea-Dweller =

Line of watches by Rolex

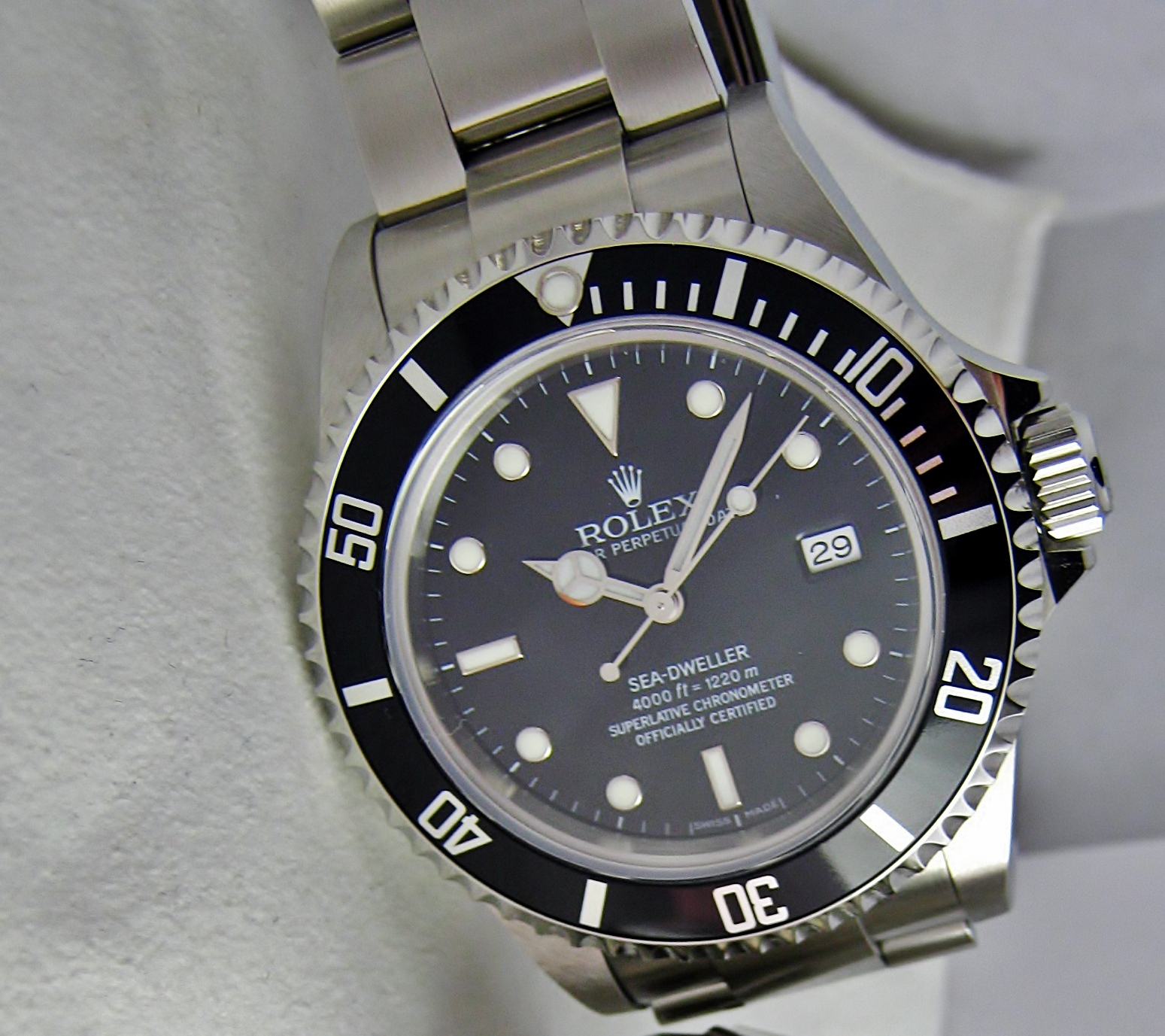
Rolex Sea-Dweller 4000 reference 166600 produced between 1989 and 2009 with a 1,220 m (4,000 ft) depth rating.

The Rolex Oyster Perpetual Date Sea-Dweller is a line of diver's watches manufactured by Rolex, with an underwater diving depth rating of 1,220 meters (4 000 ft) and up to 3,900 metres (12,800 ft) for the Sea-Dweller Deepsea variant. In 2022 the dimensionally large Deepsea Challenge Sea-Dweller variant with an official depth rating of 11,000 metres (36,090 ft) was added to the line. The Rolex Sea-Dweller is part of Rolex's Professional line.

Launched in 1967 with a depth rating of 610 metres (2,000 ft), the first Sea-Dweller available to the public featured a gas escape valve, developed by the brand specifically for saturation diving, which allows the helium trapped in the watch while decompressing to be released at a given pressure during decompression, while preserving the watch case's water resistance. Since 2019 Sea-Dweller models are available in steel or steel and yellow gold, and have a 43 mm case.

The Deepsea models come equipped with the brand's patented Ringlock system, which was designed to provide a higher degree of pressure resistance.

The current 43.0 and 44.0 mm (1.69 and 1.73 in) diameter Sea-Dweller and Sea-Dweller Deepsea variants featuring date complications, display a relatively large distance between the date window and minute markers track on the dial due to using movements designed to fit smaller 40.0 mm (1.57 in) watch cases. Using such a movement in the no-date 50.0 mm (1.97 in) Deepsea Challenge variant would result in a date window position that would conspicuously deviate from other Rolex Professional line models featuring date complications.

== History ==
During the 1960s, the needs of professional divers working at great depths led to the development of the first 'ultra water resistant' tool watches designed for conducting safe diving operations at 300 m^{+} (1,000 ft^{+}) depths. Rolex chose to develop a Submariner sibling model with greater depth capabilities—the Submariner model at that time had a depth rating of 200 metres (656 ft)—to meet the specific requirements of these users.

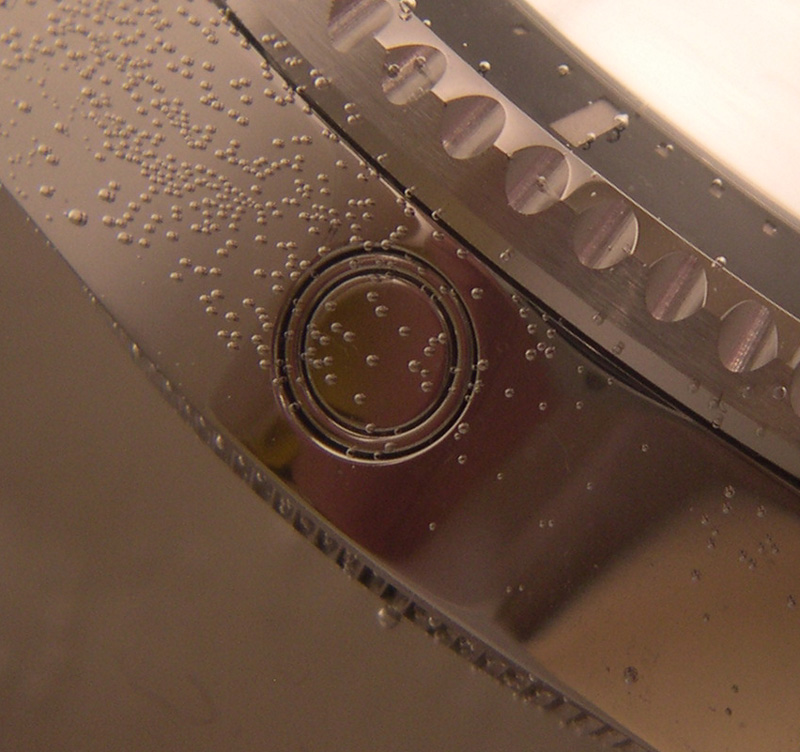
The Sea-Dweller's automatically operating helium escape valve

Most Sea-Dweller watches incorporate an automatic helium escape valve integrated in the case opposite of the watch crown for saturation diving. Early Sea-Dwellers, however, did not always have the valve. Until the 2017 introduction of the reference number 126600, Sea-Dweller's were also distinguished by the absence of the (plano-convex) date magnifying lens ("cyclops") present on most other Rolex models as it was impossible to attach a cyclops with Ultraviolet (UV) light curing adhesive at the top of a (domed) watch crystal exposed to the pressure encountered at its test depth. The Sea-Dweller diving watch range has been standard issue for Comex divers since 1977.

=== First version ===
The first version was the prototype non-valve Reference 1665 Sea-Dweller, the so-called "Single Red" with a depth rating of 500 metres (1,640 ft). The "Single Red" nickname originates from the single red "SEA-DWELLER” text line on the watch dial. Most of the ten prototype non-valve watches were awarded to pioneers in underwater exploration like Robert Palmer Bradley, who was a pilot of Deepstar 4000. Other examples were given to Tektite habitat Aquanauts such as Ian Koblick or Richard Waller.

=== Further development ===
The Rolex Sea-Dweller reference 1665 was developed in the second quarter of 1967 but became available to the public only in 1971. The delay was probably caused by issues with obtaining the patent for the helium escape valve filed by Rolex on 6 November 1967 and granted on 15 June 1970. The first Sea-Dweller models made between April and June 1967 did not feature a helium gas release valve. In late 1967, an archeological diver named T. Walker Lloyd approached Rolex with the idea for the valve as watches used in saturation diving experienced problems during decompression. Helium atoms inside a pressure chamber can work their way inside a water-resistant watch. During decompression, the pressure inside the chamber can decrease more rapidly than the pressure inside the watch case. This can, in some cases, cause the watch crystal to (violently) pop off. The helium release valve allows helium to escape in a controlled way from the case during decompression, preventing damage to the watch. The original idea for using a one-way valve came from Robert A. Barth, a US Navy diver who pioneered saturation diving during the US Navy Genesis and SEALAB missions led by Dr. George F. Bond. The very first valve prototype was given to Dr. Ralph Werner Brauer, a professor for physiology at Duke University and director of the Wrightsville Marine Biomedical Laboratory of the University of North Carolina Wilmington. Brauer tested the watch during a series of Physalie dives at the Comex Hyperbaric Center in Marseille, France. In the past, it was wrongly assumed the Sea-Dweller was developed in cooperation with Comex S.A. industrial deep-sea diving, but the French company became a partner of Rolex only in late 1971.

=== Sea-Dweller Submariner 2000 models ===
The Sea-Dweller Submariner 2000 versions were made between 1967-1983 and had an increased depth rating of 610 metres (2,000 ft) and so-called Double Red dials. The Sea-Dweller Submariner 2000 watches have two red "SEA-DWELLER / Submariner 2000” text lines on the watch dial, which led to an unofficial "Double Red" designation by watch collectors. The Rolex Sea-Dweller 2000 watch case has a diameter of 40.0 mm (1.57 in) mm and a thickness of 14.7 mm (0.58 in). The crystal was thick, domed plexiglass. Following the Double Red dial, an all white dial version was released in 1977 and ran until approximately 1983, called the "Great White". The Rolex Sea-Dweller is part of Rolex's Professional line.

=== Sea-Dweller 4000 models ===
The Sea-Dweller Submariner 2000 models were succeeded by the Rolex Oyster Perpetual Sea-Dweller 4000 (4000 ft = 1220 m) model 16660, or "Triple-Six", with an increased depth rating to 1,220 metres (4,000 ft). These watches had a Caliber 3035 movement and were made between 1978 and 1989. It was the first Rolex tool watch to receive a sapphire crystal, thicker case and a reworked larger more reliable helium escape valve. The last Comex Sea-Dweller 4000 Rolex reference number is 16600. It featured an improved bracelet with solid end links and an updated Calibre 3135 movement. This watch was issued to Comex divers since 1992. The Rolex Sea-Dweller 4000 watch case has a diameter of 40.0 mm (1.57 in) and a thickness of 15.5 mm (0.61 in) (crystal thickness 4 mm (0.16 in)), and the case and bracelet weigh 165 g (5.8 oz). The luminous paint used changed from tritium to LumiNova to Super-LumiNova. The 166600 was discontinued in 2009 and replaced by the 44mm Deepsea Sea-Dweller model 116660.

==== 2014 Sea-Dweller 4000 re-introduction ====
In 2014 Rolex re-introduced the Sea-Dweller with a new 116600 reference, also known as the SD4K. This watch retained the historic 40 mm case size but was updated with a cerachrom ceramic bezel inlay with all 60 individual minutes marked instead of only the first 15 minutes and the new ‘Maxi dial’ for increased utility and legibility. It used the Calibre 3135 automatic movement. The bracelet was updated with the new quick adjustment ‘glidelock extension’ system (20 mm adjustment range in 2 mm increments) that combined with the ‘fliplock extension link’ (adds 27 mm length to the bracelet) allows the watch to be worn over a very thick diving suit without the use of any tools. These watches were made between 2014 and 2017 – making it one of the shortest production runs for any Rolex sports model – and marked the end of the 40.0 mm (1.57 in) diameter Sea-Dweller models featuring a 20 mm (0.79 in) lug width.

==== 2017 enlarged Sea-Dweller 4000 introduction ====
At the BaselWorld watch and jewelry show 2017, Rolex introduced an enlarged Sea-Dweller model (126600) featuring a (flat) watch crystal with a date magnifying lens and an updated automatic movement (Calibre 3235). The Rolex Sea-Dweller 126600 watch case has a diameter of 43.0 mm (1.69 in) mm, 3.0 mm larger than previous generations of the Sea-Dweller, a thickness of 15.2 mm (0.60 in) and provides more curvature to fit average wrists. Like the watch case, the lug width has also been increased to 22.0 mm (0.87 in) and the bracelet was subtly optimized for the watch case. The new ‘glidelock extension’ system (20 mm adjustment range in 2 mm increments) combined with the ‘fliplock extension link’ (adds 27 mm length to the bracelet) allows the watch to be worn over a very thick diving suit.

In 2019, Rolex introduced the first two-tone Sea-Dweller with reference 126603. Like the previous release, it has a 43.0 mm (1.69 in) case and Caliber 3235 movement, but diverts from the previous no frills utilitarian tool watch for saturation divers approach with the addition of fashionable 18 k gold accents on the watch case and bracelet.

=== Semi-custom production runs ===
Several semi-custom production runs of Sea-Dweller Submariner 2000 and 4000 models were produced with and without helium escape valves and differing watch dial patterns for the Comex S.A. company. These variants sometimes also had differing Rolex reference numbers. Some of these non-standard Sea-Dweller watches had the Comex S.A. logo depicted on the watch dial, which led to an unofficial "COMEX watches" designation by collectors. These watches were either issued to Comex staff members or were given as business gifts.

=== Rolex Sea-Dweller Deepsea variant ===
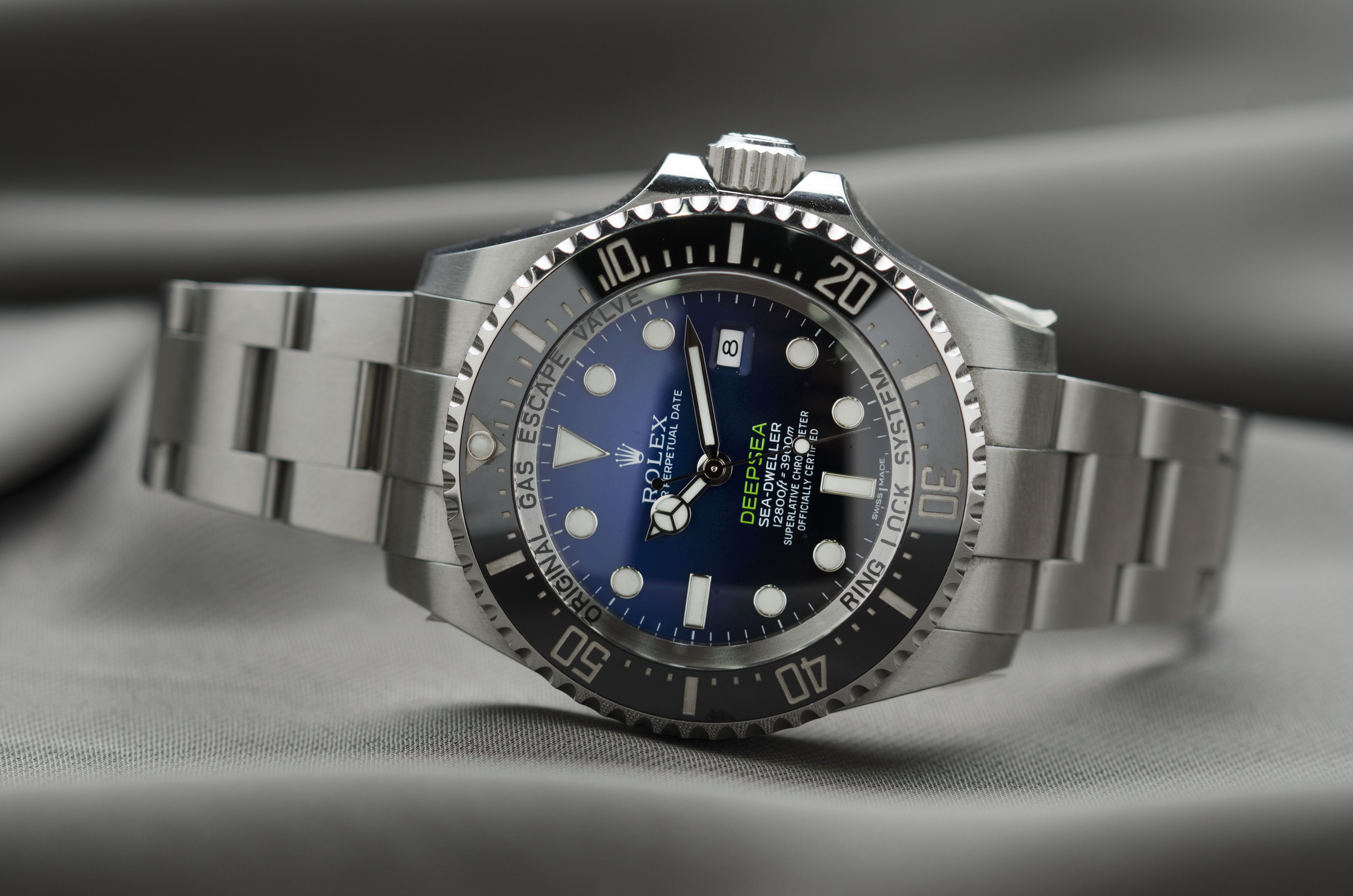
Rolex Sea-Dweller DEEPSEA introduced in 2014. A blue dial variant honoring James Cameron's dive to the Challenger Deep in 2012. Notice the relatively large distance between the date window and minute markers track on the dial.

At the BaselWorld watch and jewellery show 2008, Rolex introduced an updated Sea-Dweller model named the Rolex Oyster Perpetual Date Sea-Dweller Deepsea. It used the Calibre 3135 movement, a 20 mm bracelet tapering down to 18 mm to a folding clasp. The reference number or this first iteration is 116660.

With an official depth rating of 3,900 metres (12,800 ft), the Sea-Dweller deepsea represented in its launch year the most water resistant mechanical watch in serial production. To obtain this official depth rating, the Sea-Dweller deepsea is tested to a depth of 4,875 metres (15,994 ft) to offer the 25% safety reserve required by the ISO 6425 divers' watches standard. To test the water resistance of the Sea-Dweller DEEPSEA, Rolex uses testing equipment developed for them by Comex. Normal surface air filled watch cases and crystals designed for extreme depths must be large to cope with the water pressure.
The Rolex Sea-Dweller Deepsea watch case has a diameter of 44.0 mm (1.73 in) and a thickness of 17.7 mm (0.70 in) (domed crystal thickness 5.5 mm (0.22 in)), and the case and bracelet weigh 212 g (7.5 oz).
Other features which came with the Deepsea at 2008 was the "Ringlock System" for sealing the sapphire crystal to the case, a weight reducing caseback made of grade 5 titanium alloy, the "Glidelock-clasp" and Fliplock diver extension link, "maxi-dial", engraved rehaut, ceramic bezel with platinum-filled numbers, calibre 3135 with antimagnetic Parachrome-Blue-hairspring and blue "Chromalight" lume.

The first variant of Sea-Dweller Deepsea reference 116660 has a classic black dial with white text on the dial.

A second "D-Blue"-variant was released in 2014 in honor of James Cameron and his journey to the deepest area of Earth's oceans in the year 2012. It has a blue/black dial and green colored "DEEPSEA"-label.

The first-generation Deepsea models introduced in 2008 came on a relatively narrow 20 mm (0.79 in) lug width bracelet.

In 2018, the second-generation Deepsea model reference 126660 was introduced at Baselworld. It was updated with the Calibre 3235 movement, a broader 22 mm (0.87 in) lug width bracelet tapering down to 20 mm (0.79 in) to a resized folding clasp and a slightly redesigned case. The clasp featured a ‘glidelock extension’ system (20 mm adjustment range in 2 mm increments) that combined with the ‘fliplock extension link’ (adds 27 mm length to the bracelet) allows the watch to be worn over a very thick diving suit.

In 2022, the third-generation Deepsea model reference 136660 was introduced. It also uses the Calibre 3235, a redesigned folding clasp that omitted the ‘fliplock extension link’, an 8% enlarged date wheel and window, and slimmer bezel ring.

A solid yellow gold version of the Deepsea with model reference 136668LB (lunette bleu) was introduced in 2024, featuring a blue dial and blue bezel and weighing in at 322 grams.

=== Rolex Sea-Dweller Deepsea Challenge variant ===
In November 2022 Rolex introduced the Rolex Oyster Perpetual Deepsea Challenge Sea-Dweller (reference 126067), a commercial full ocean depth capable watch with an official depth rating of 11,000 metres (36,090 ft). This watch represented in its launch year the most water resistant mechanical watch in serial production. To obtain this official depth rating, the watch is tested to a depth of 13,750 metres (45,110 ft) to offer the 25% safety reserve required by the ISO 6425 divers' watches standard. The Rolex Deepsea Challenge watch case has a diameter of 50.0 mm (1.97 in) and a thickness of 23.0 mm (0.91 in) domed crystal thickness 9.5 mm (0.37 in) and the grade 5 titanium alloy case and bracelet weigh 251 g (8.9 oz). The Deepsea Challenge model uses the Calibre 3230 movement that does not feature a date complication unlike the Deepsea and Sea-Dweller models, which were designed for saturation diving were people have to spend multiple days in pressurized environments.

== Diving records ==
The design and actual availability of divers' watches certified for more than 1,000 to 1,200 metres (3,280 to 3,940 ft) is not explicable solely by practical diving needs nor crewed deep diving experiments, because of the constraints set by physiological limits for fit humans.

The diving depth record for actual offshore diving was achieved in 1988 by a team of professional divers (Th. Arnold, S. Icart, J.G. Marcel Auda, R. Peilho, P. Raude, L. Schneider) of the Comex S.A. industrial deep-sea diving company performing pipeline connection exercises at a depth of 534 metres (1,752 ft) of seawater (msw) in the Mediterranean Sea. They wore Rolex Sea-Dwellers.

In 1992, Comex diver Théo Mavrostomos achieved a record of 701 metres (2,300 ft) of seawater (msw) in an onshore hyperbaric chamber. He took 43 days to complete the dive. The watch used during this scientific record dive, where a hydrogen-helium-oxygen (hydreliox) gas mixture was used as breathing gas, was a Rolex Sea-Dweller 166600 with a 1,220 m (4,000 ft) depth rating. Rolex used this achievement in advertising campaigns.

The complexity, medical problems and physiological limits, such as those imposed by high pressure nervous syndrome, the accompanying high costs of professional saturation diving to extreme depths and the development of deep water atmospheric diving suits and remotely operated underwater vehicles in offshore oilfield drilling and production effectively ended the need for ever deeper, non-atmospheric crewed intervention in the ocean. There are few organizations who have the capability to do saturation dives to even 300 metres (980 ft). These practical factors make watch depth ratings of more than 1,000 to 1,200 metres (3,280 to 3,940 ft) marketing and technical show off curiosities.

== Experimental Sea-Dweller DEEPSEA CHALLENGE watch ==
In late March 2012, Rolex announced that a new prototype diving watch was developed and is part of the Rolex supported attempt to dive the DSV Deepsea Challenger to the bottom of the Challenger Deep, the deepest surveyed point in the oceans. On 26 March 2012 the DSV Deepsea Challenger carried a Rolex Oyster Perpetual Date Sea-Dweller DEEPSEA CHALLENGE prototype diving watch strapped to its manipulator arm to a depth of 10,898.4 metres (35,756 ft) of seawater (msw). The experimental Sea-Dweller DEEPSEA CHALLENGE watch is designed to be waterproof up to 12,000 metres (39,370 ft). According to the pilot of the DSV Deepsea Challenger, James Cameron, the "Rolex Deepsea Challenge was the reliable companion throughout the dive; it was visible on the sub's manipulator arm and working precisely at 10,898 meters down at the bottom of the Challenger Deep." The normal surface air filled watch case has a diameter of 51.4 mm (2.02 in) and a thickness of 28.5 mm (1.12 in) (domed synthetic sapphire crystal 14.3 mm (0.56 in)) to cope with the water pressure at the deepest surveyed point in the oceans. It featured a date complication but not a helium escape valve, as the experimental watch was not intended for saturation diving.

== Related pages ==
- Diving Watch
- Omega Seamaster
- Rolex Daytona
- Rolex Day-Date
- Rolex Datejust
- Rolex GMT Master II
- Rolex Milgauss
- Rolex Submariner
- Rolex Yacht-Master
- Rolex Explorer II
