= Rolex =

Swiss watch designer and manufacturer

Coordinates: 46°11′36″N 6°7′58″E

Rolex SA
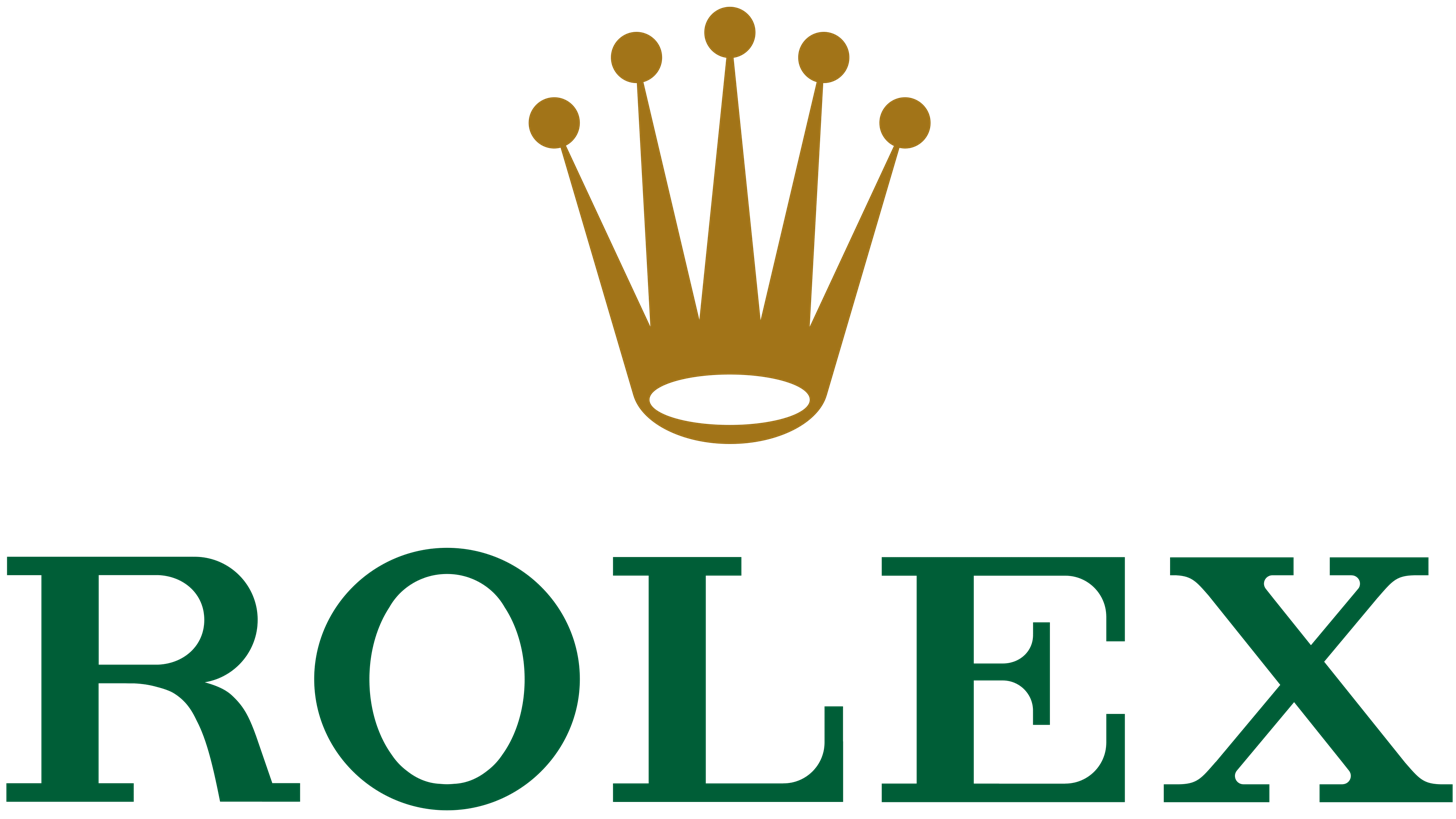

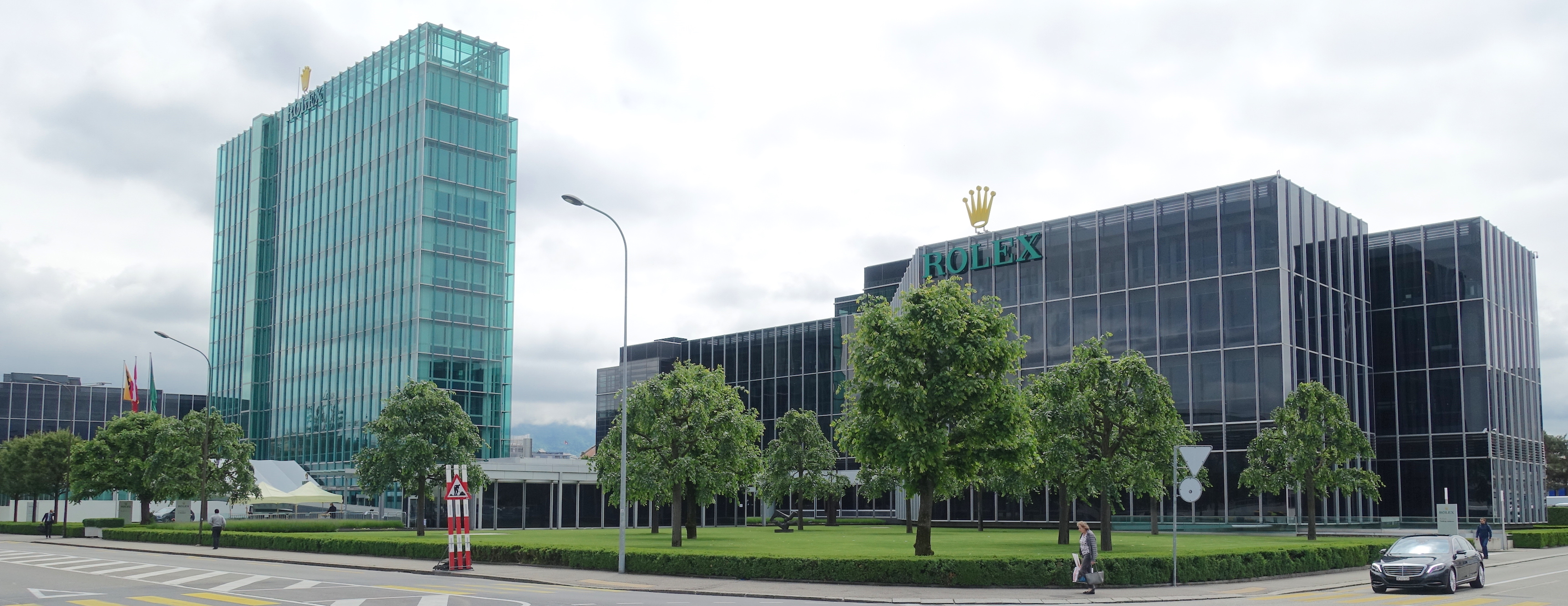
- Headquarters in Geneva, Switzerland
- Formerly: Wilsdorf and Davis (1905–1919); Rolex Watch Co. Ltd (1919–1919); Montres Rolex SA (1919–1920)
- Type: Société anonyme
- Industry: Watchmaking
- Founded: 1905; 121 years ago in London
- Founders: Hans Wilsdorf; Alfred Davis
- Headquarters: Geneva, Switzerland
- Area served: Worldwide
- Key people: Jean-Frédéric Dufour (CEO)
- Products: Watches
- Production output: ▲1.24 million pieces (2023)
- Revenue: ▲CHF 10.1 billion (2023)
- Owner: Hans Wilsdorf Foundation
- Number of employees: 7000
- Subsidiaries: Montres Tudor SA; Bucherer AG
- Website: rolex.com

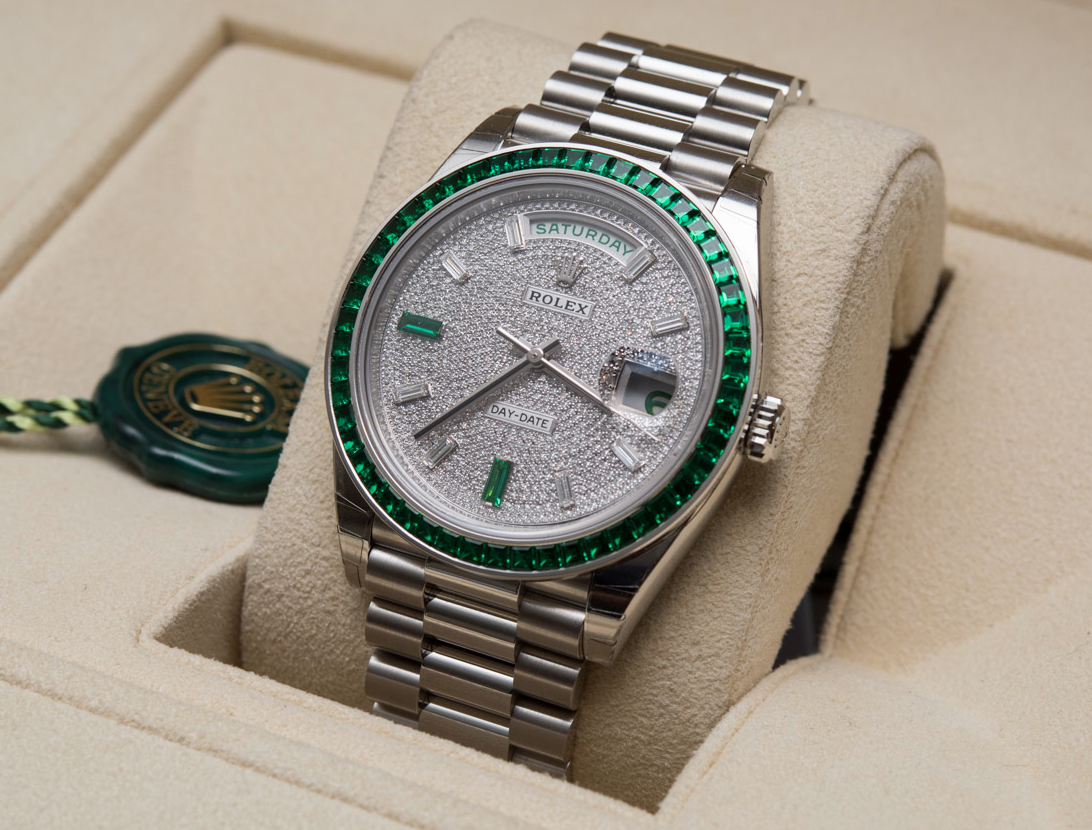
Rolex watch in original packaging

Rolex SA (/ˈroʊlɛks/) is a Swiss luxury watchmaker and manufacturer based in Geneva, Switzerland. Founded in 1905 in London as Wilsdorf and Davis by German businessman Hans Wilsdorf and British investor and watch dealer Alfred Davis, who were importing watches from Switzerland to England. The company registered Rolex as the brand name of its watches in 1908 and became Rolex Watch Co. Ltd. in 1915. After World War I, the company moved its base of operations to Geneva because of the unfavorable economy that led to business instability. In 1920, Hans Wilsdorf registered Montres Rolex SA in Geneva as the new company name (montre is French for watch); it later became Rolex SA. Since 1960, the company has been owned by the Hans Wilsdorf Foundation, a private family trust.

Rolex SA and its subsidiary Montres Tudor SA design, make, distribute, and service wristwatches sold under the Rolex and Tudor brands. In 2023, Rolex agreed to acquire its longtime retail partner Bucherer, and in 2024, Rolex began construction of a new affiliate on Fifth Avenue in Midtown Manhattan, New York City, near Billionaires' Row.

== History ==
=== Early history ===
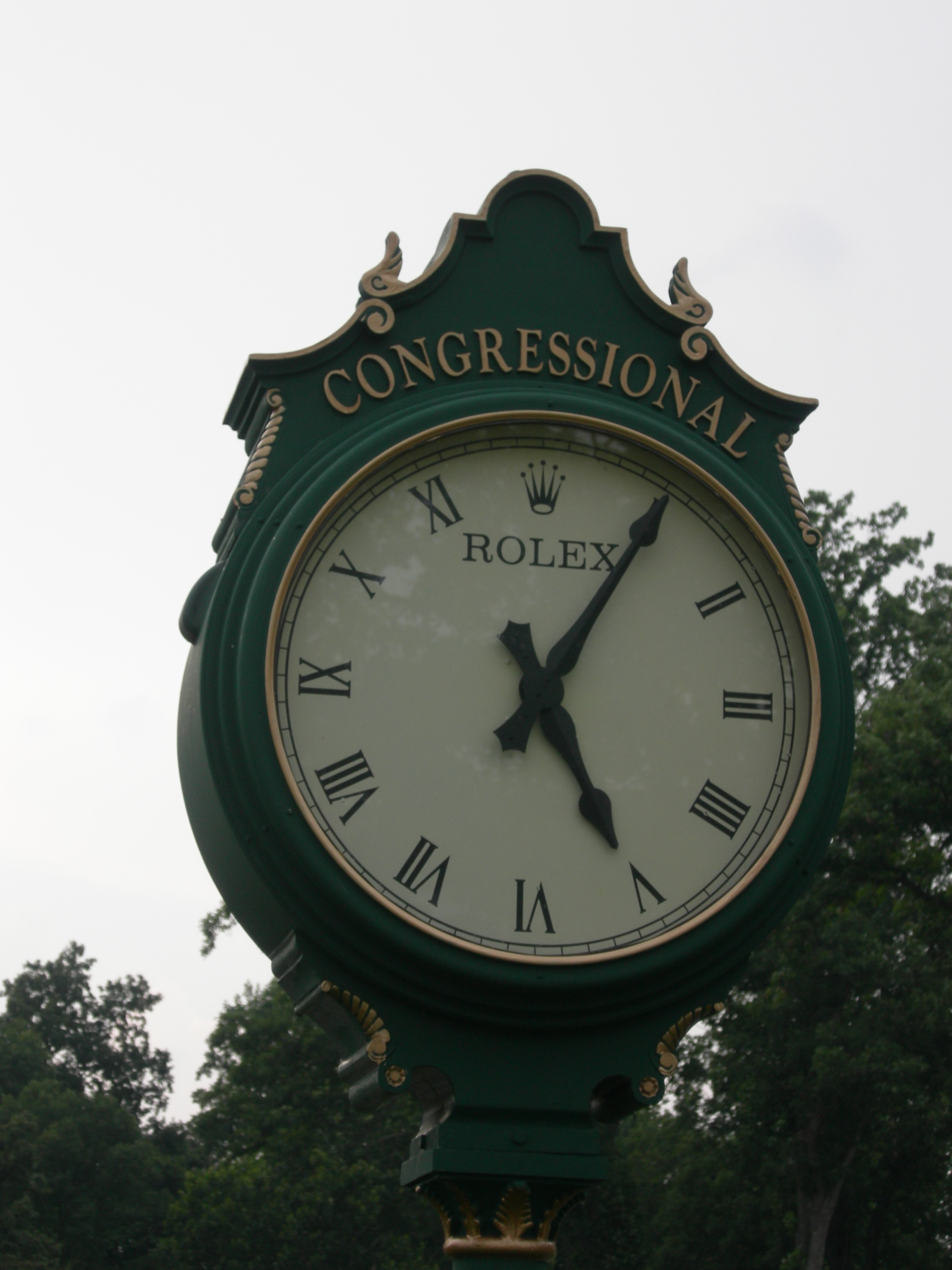
A Rolex clock near the Congressional Country Club in Bethesda, Maryland, United States

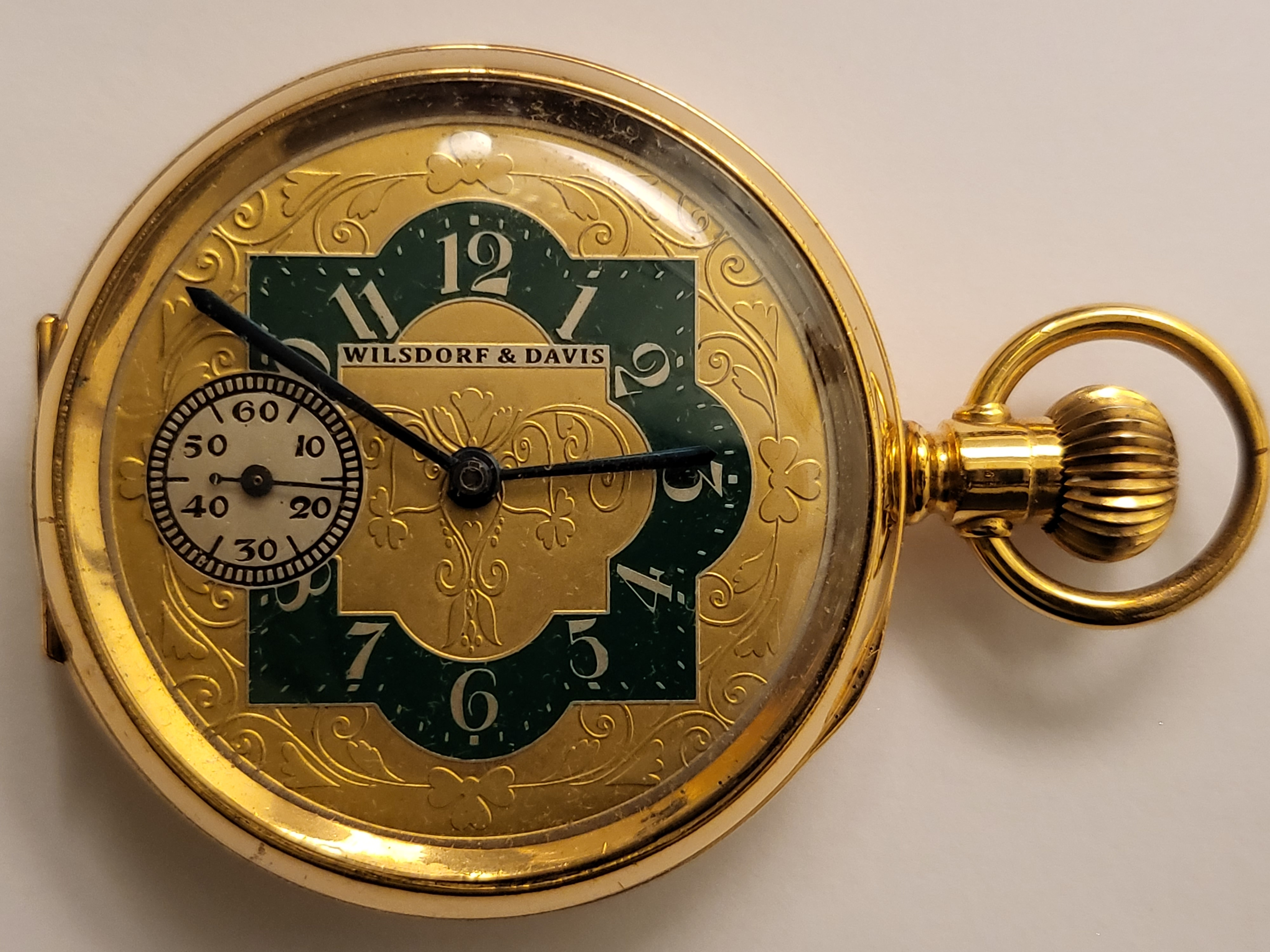
The only known pocket watch bearing the full “Wilsdorf & Davis” name on the dial. Wilsdorf & Davis (founded 1905) was the precursor to Rolex.

Alfred Davis and his brother-in-law Hans Wilsdorf founded Wilsdorf and Davis, the company that would eventually become Rolex SA, in London in 1905. Wilsdorf and Davis's main commercial activity at the time involved importing Hermann Aegler's Swiss movements to England and placing them in watch cases made by Dennison and others. These early wristwatches were sold to many jewellers, who then put their own names on the dial. The earliest watches from Wilsdorf and Davis were usually hallmarked "W&D" inside the caseback.

In 1908, Wilsdorf registered the trademark "Rolex", which became the brand name of watches from Wilsdorf and Davis. He opened an office in La Chaux-de-Fonds, Switzerland. Wilsdorf wanted the brand name to be easily pronounceable in any language, and short enough to fit on the face of a watch. He also thought that the name "Rolex" was onomatopoeic, sounding like a watch being wound.

During World War I, Rolex manufactured trench watches. In November 1915, the company changed its name to Rolex Watch Co. Ltd. In 1919, Hans Wilsdorf moved the company from England to Geneva, Switzerland, because of heavy post-war taxes levied on luxury imports and high export duties on the silver and gold used for the watch cases. In 1919 the company's name was officially changed to Montres Rolex SA and later in 1920 to Rolex SA.

With administrative worries attended to, Wilsdorf turned the company's attention to a technical challenge: the infiltration of dust and moisture under the dial and crown, which damaged the movement. To address this problem, a third-party casemaker produced a waterproof and dustproof wristwatch for Rolex in 1926, giving it the name "Oyster". The original patent attributed to Paul Perregaux and Georges Peret, which allowed the watch to be adjusted while maintaining protection from water ingress, was purchased by Rolex and heavily marketed. The watch featured a hermetically sealed case which provided optimal protection for the movement.

As a demonstration, Rolex submerged Oyster models in aquariums, which it displayed in the windows of its main points of sale. In 1927, British swimmer Mercedes Gleitze swam the English Channel with an Oyster on her necklace, becoming the first Rolex ambassador. To celebrate the feat, Rolex published a full-page advertisement on the front page of the Daily Mail for every issue for a whole month proclaiming the watch's success during the ten-hour-plus swim.

In 1931, Rolex patented a self-winding mechanism called a Perpetual rotor, a semi-circular plate that relies on gravity to move freely. In turn, the Oyster watch became known as the Oyster Perpetual. The invention of the Perpetual rotor by Rolex in 1931 revolutionized the self-winding watch, as prior attempts at designing automatic movements had not been able to produce practical end products.

From 1935 until 1945, Rolex produced special diving watches for the Italian underwater demolition teams of the Decima Flottiglia MAS. These watches were distributed through the Italian Rolex retailer Orologeria Svizzera belonging to G. Panerai & Figlio in Florence. During World War II, Italy was part of the Axis powers and fought against the British. Members of the Italian Decima Flottiglia MAS damaged and sunk several British ships, including two important battleships, the Valiant and the Queen Elizabeth. In 1944, a large quantity of these Rolex-made watches (around 1000 pieces) were supplied to German Kampfschwimmers, who had been trained by the reconstituted Decima Flottiglia MAS under Junio Valerio Borghese following the Armistice of Cassibile in which Italy surrendered to the Allies.

In mid-1941, Hans Wilsdorf, who had become a British citizen in 1911, was investigated by the security police of the Canton of Geneva after the British had voiced concerns that he was a Nazi sympathizer. The inquiry concluded:

"The information gathered shows that Wilsdorf is a fervent admirer of the Hitler regime. He does not hide his satisfaction when events favourable to Germany occur. However, we have not seen or heard of any pro-Hitler propaganda or suspicious activity on his part. The above-mentioned person is not unfavourably known to our judicial services and has not been convicted in our town. From a political point of view, Wilsdorf is known to our services as a 'Nazi'. A check of his correspondence was carried out in 1940, but nothing suspicious was found at the time."

While under investigation by the United Kingdom's domestic counter-intelligence and security agency MI5 as a suspected Nazi spy, Wilsdorf came up with the idea of offering watches to Allied prisoners of war in German captivity, possibly in an attempt to gain favour with the British government and avoid being blacklisted. At the time, Rolex did not receive certificates of origin to export watches to the UK, so this was a way to circumvent the restrictions. Payment for the POW watches was only due after the end of the war. Through the Red Cross, more than 3,000 British officers were sent watches to prison camps like Stalag and Oflag with the explicit approval of German authorities. In 1947, Rolex published advertisements in various British newspapers asking for payment from the buyers. Until then, only 400 watches had been paid.

Upon the death of his wife in 1944, Wilsdorf established the Hans Wilsdorf Foundation, a private trust, in which he left all of his Rolex shares, ensuring that some of the company's income would go to charity. Wilsdorf died in 1960, and since then the trust has owned and run Rolex SA.

=== Later history and strategy ===
During the early 2000s, Rolex acquired watch components manufacturers like Aegler in 2004 – who supplied mechanical movements – to increase in-house components production and assembly to become a vertical integrated watch manufacturer and maximize technical and commercial control. As of the 2020s, the production of relatively few main components is outsourced. According to Rolex, the watch hands are provided by Fiedler SA and the sapphire crystals are provided by an unknown external source.

Rolex produced and sold approximately 1.24 million watches in 2023. According to the February 2025 LuxeConsult & Morgan Stanley annual report on the Swiss watch industry, Rolex 2024 units produced were 1,176,000 and revenues were estimated at CHF 10.5B with an implied retail value of CHF 15.5B for a 32% market share of the luxury watch market. To maximize retail control and hence the availability of new watches, Rolex established an international authorized dealer network. Additionally, waiting lists for new watches help to maintain an exclusive brand image and product pricing power. For maintenance and repair work, Rolex established an international official regional service centers network.

== Charitable status ==
The Hans Wilsdorf Foundation, which privately owns Rolex SA, is a registered Swiss charitable foundation and pays a lower tax rate. Unlike publicly traded competitors like Richemont or LVMH, Rolex maintains strict secrecy, disclosing no financials or operational metrics. In 2011, a spokesman for Rolex declined to provide evidence regarding the amount of charitable donations made by the Wilsdorf Foundation, which brought up several scandals due to the lack of transparency. In Geneva where the company is based, it is said to have gifted, among many things, two housing buildings to social institutions in Geneva.

== Subsidiaries ==
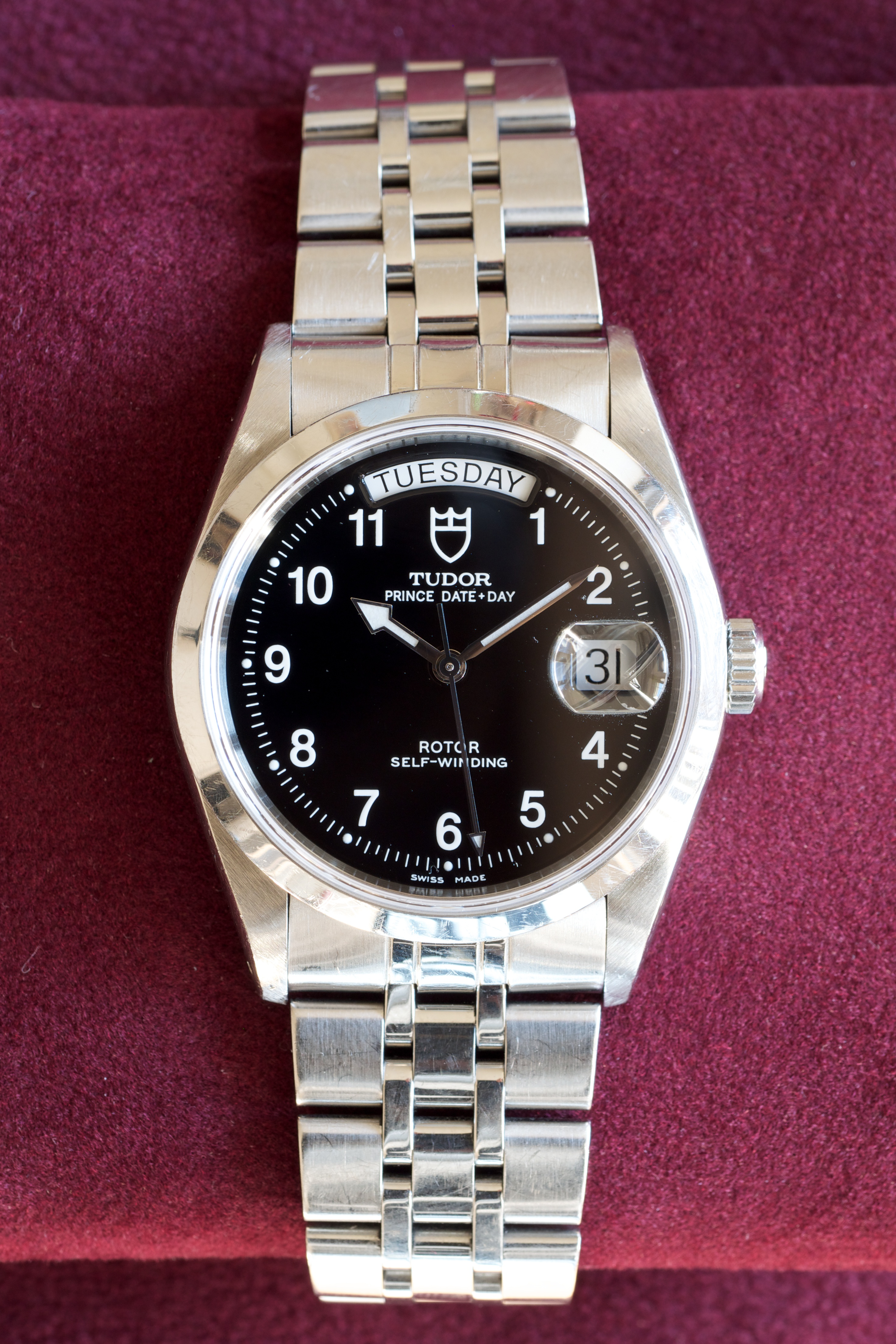
Wristwatch Tudor Prince Date Day (ref. 76200)

Rolex SA offers products under the Rolex and Tudor brands. Montres Tudor SA has designed, manufactured and marketed Tudor watches since 6 March 1946. Rolex founder Hans Wilsdorf conceived Tudor to create a product for authorized Rolex dealers to sell that offered the reliability and dependability of a Rolex, but at a lower price. The number of Rolex watches was limited by the rate that they could produce in-house Rolex movements, thus Tudor watches were originally equipped with third-party standard movements supplied by ETA SA while using Rolex-quality cases and bracelets. Since 2015, Tudor has begun to manufacture watches with in-house movements. The first model introduced with an in-house movement was the Tudor North Flag. Following this, updated versions of the Tudor Pelagos and Tudor Heritage Black Bay have also been fitted with an in-house caliber.

Tudor watches are marketed and sold in most countries around the world. Montres Tudor SA discontinued sales of Tudor-branded watches in the United States in 2004, but Tudor returned to the United States market in the summer of 2013, and to the UK in 2014.

== Production ==
Each Rolex comes with a unique serial number, which can help indicate its approximate production period. Serial numbers were first introduced in 1926 and were issued sequentially, until 1954, when Rolex restarted from #999,999 to #0. In 1987, there was an addition of one letter to a 6-digit serial number and in 2010, to the present date Rolex introduced random serial numbers.

== Quartz movements ==
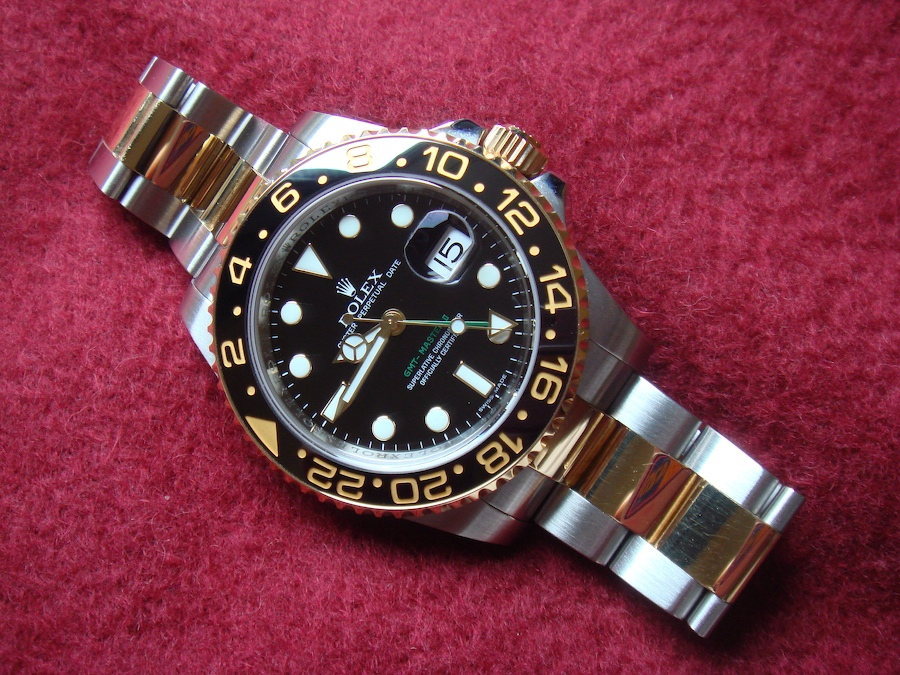
Rolex GMT Master II gold and stainless steel (ref. 116713LN)

While Rolex mostly produces mechanical watches, it also participated in development of the original quartz watch movements. Although Rolex has made very few quartz models for its Oyster line, the company's engineers were instrumental in design and implementation of the technology during the late 1960s and early 1970s. In 1968, Rolex collaborated with a consortium of 16 Swiss watch manufacturers to develop the Beta 21 quartz movement used in their Rolex Quartz Date 5100 alongside other manufactures including the Omega Electroquartz watches. Within about five years of research, design and development, Rolex created the "clean-slate" 5035/5055 movement that would eventually power the Rolex Oysterquartz.

== Materials ==
Rolex watches feature various bezel, including smooth, fluted, ceramic, graduated, and gem-set. Rolex also previously produced engine-turned bezels, also referred to its French name guilloché, which denotes a decorative technique whereby an intricate and repetitive pattern is mechanically engraved into a material via a specialized machine.

Material-wise, Rolex first used its "Cerachrom" ceramic bezel on the GMT-Master II in 2005, and has since then implemented ceramic bezel inserts across the range of professional sports watches. They are available on the Submariner, Sea Dweller, Deepsea, GMT Master II and Daytona models. In contrast to the aluminum bezel which it replaced, the ceramic bezel color does not wear out from exposure to UV-light and is scratch resistant.

Rolex uses 904L grade stainless steel; in contrast, most Swiss watches are made with 316L grade steel. Rolex has used this since 1985, it is more resistant to corrosion and when polished, leaves a more attractive lustre but is softer and easier to scratch.

== Notable models ==
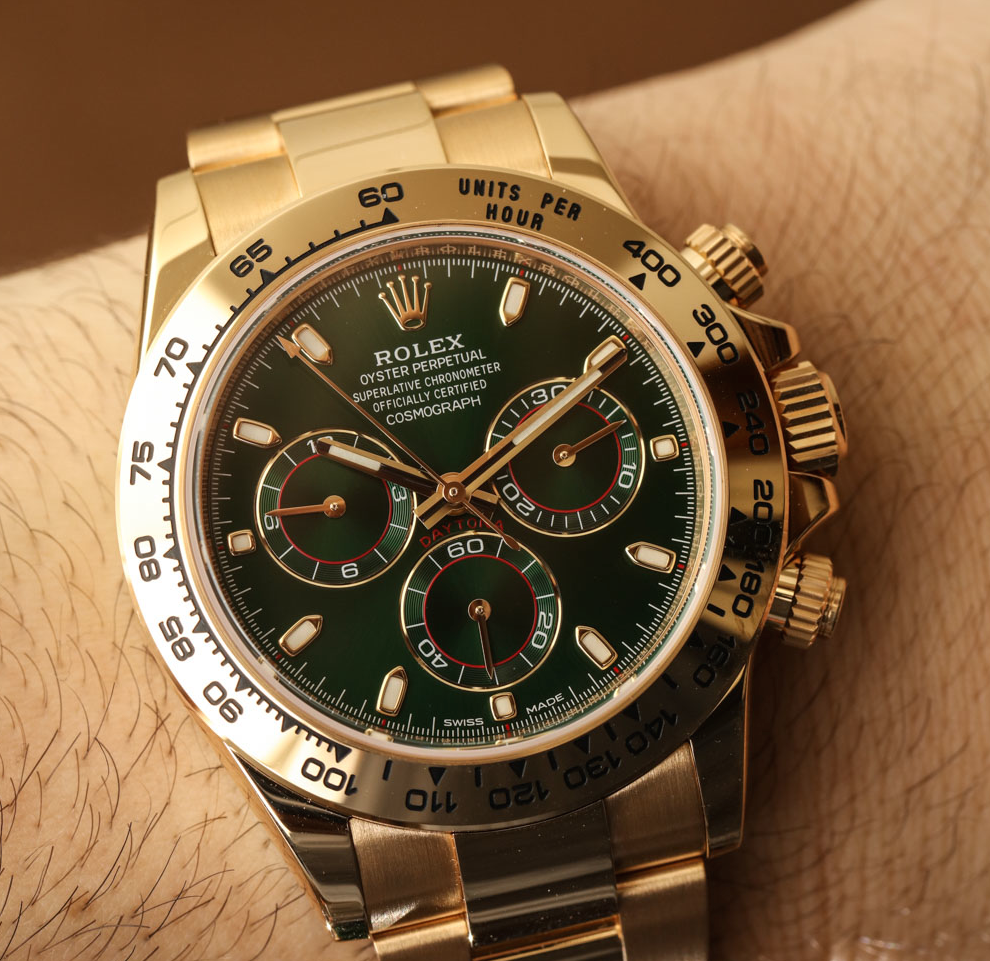
Rolex Cosmograph Daytona on a wrist

In general, Rolex has three watch lines: Oyster Perpetual, Professional and 1908 (the 1908 line is Rolex's line of "dress" watches). The primary bracelets for the Oyster line are named Jubilee, Oyster, President, and Pearlmaster. The watch straps on the models are usually either stainless steel, yellow gold, white gold, rose gold, or platinum. In the United Kingdom, the retail price for the stainless steel 'Pilots' range (such as the GMT Master II) starts from £9,350. Diamond inlay watches are more expensive. The book Vintage Wristwatches by Antiques Roadshow's Reyne Haines listed a price estimate of vintage Rolex watches that ranged between US$650 and US$75,000, while listing vintage Tudors between US$250 and US$9,000.

=== Air-Kings ===
Rolex founder Hans Wilsdorf created the Air-Prince line to honor RAF pilots of the Battle of Britain, releasing the first model in 1958. By 2007, the 1142XX iteration of the Air-King featured a COSC-certified movement in a 34mm case, considered by some a miniaturized variant of the 39mm Rolex Explorer as both watches featured very similar styling cues; the 34mm Air-King lineup was the least expensive series of Oyster Perpetual. In 2014 the Air-King was dropped, making the Oyster Perpetual 26/31/34/36/39 the entry-level Rolex line. In 2016 Rolex reintroduced the Air-King, available as a single model (number 116900), largely similar to its predecessors but with a larger 40mm case, and a magnetic shield found on the Rolex Milgauss; indeed the new 40mm Air-King is slightly cheaper than the 39mm Explorer (the Explorer lacks the magnetic shield but its movement has Paraflex shock absorbers that are not found in the Air-King's movement).

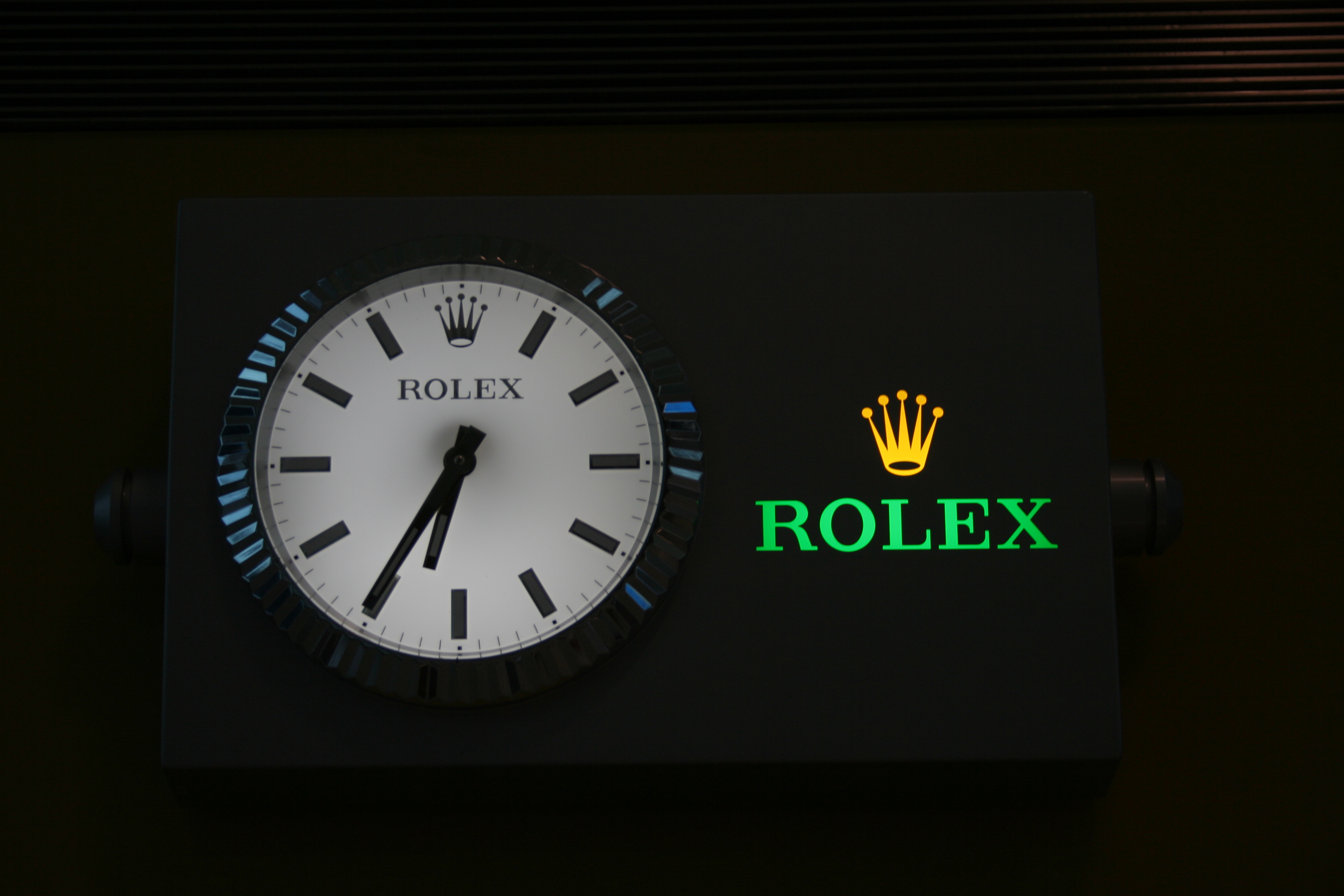
Rolex mural watch, Dubai Airport

=== Oyster Perpetual ===
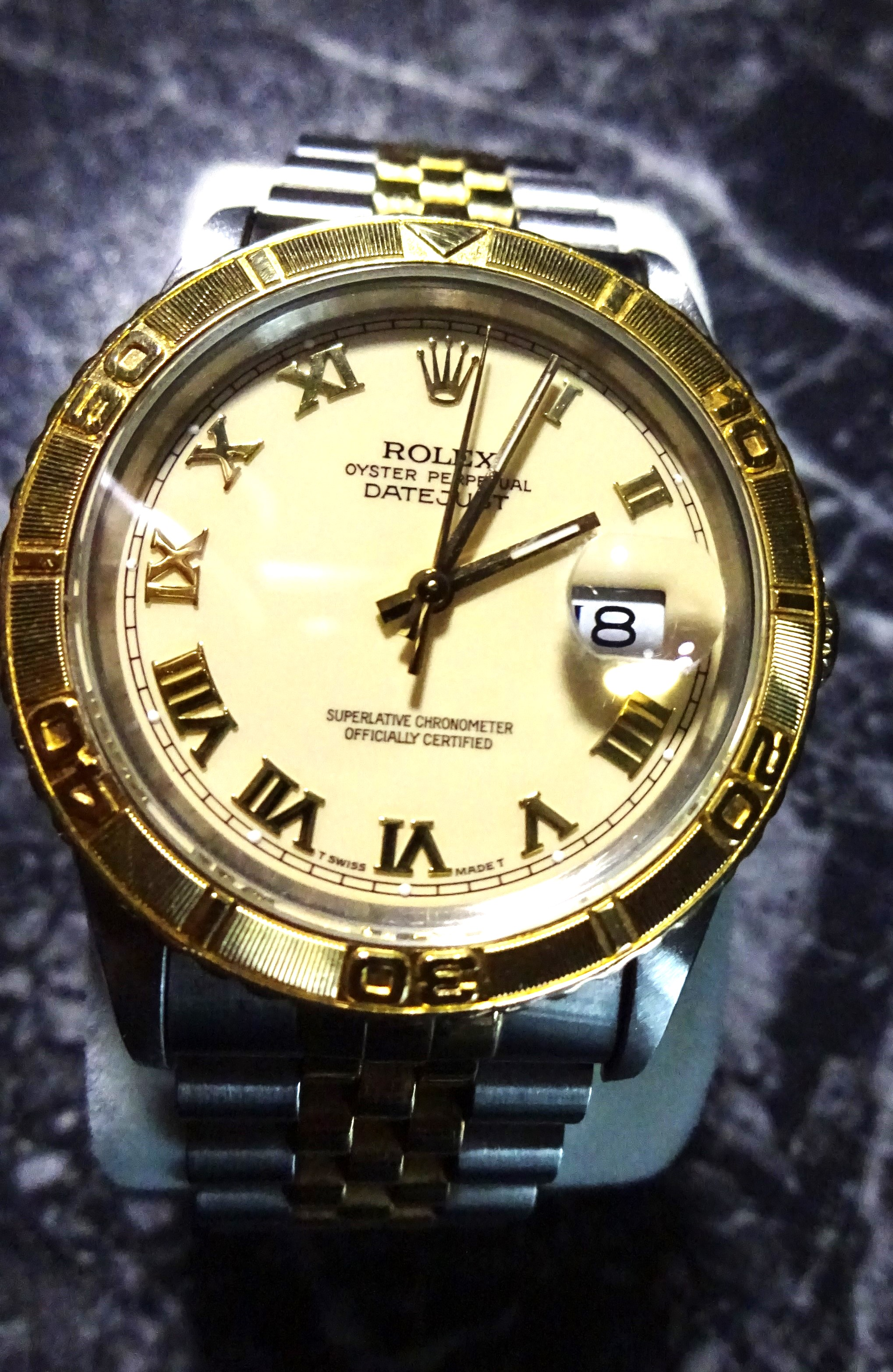
Rolex Oyster Perpetual Datejust Ref. 16263 Kaliber 3135 mit Turn-O-Graph Lünette (1992)

The name of the watch line in catalogs is often "Rolex Oyster ______" or "Rolex Oyster Perpetual ______"; Rolex Oyster and Oyster Perpetual are generic names and not specific product lines, except for the Oyster Perpetual 26/31/34/36/39/41 and Oyster Perpetual Date 34. The Rolex Oyster Perpetual watch is a direct descendant of the original watertight Rolex Oyster watch created in 1926.

Within the Oyster Perpetual lineup, there are three different movements; the 39 features the Calibre 3132 movement with the Parachrom hairspring and Paraflex shock absorbers (the Oyster Perpetual 39 is a variant of the Rolex Explorer 39mm, sharing the same case, bracelet and clasp, bezel, and movement, with a different dial and different hands), while the 34 and 36 models have the Caliber 3130 featuring the Parachrom hairspring, and the smallest 28 and 31 models have Calibre 2231. The Oyster Perpetual Date 34 (or simply Date 34) adds a date display and date movement, plus the options of a white gold fluted bezel and diamonds on the dial.

Certain models from the Date and Datejust ranges are almost identical, however the Datejust has 36 mm and 41 mm cases paired with a 20 mm bracelet, compared with the Date's 34 mm case and 19 mm bracelet. Modern versions of the Oyster Perpetual Date and Datejust models share Rolex's 3135 movement, with the most recent change to the 3135 movement being introduction of Rolex's "parachrom bleu" hairspring, which provides increased accuracy. As the Date and Datejust share a movement, both have the ability to adjust the date forward one day at a time without adjusting the time; this feature is not confined to the Datejust. Compared with the Date, the Datejust has a much wider range of customization options, including other metals beyond stainless steel, various materials for the dial, and optional diamonds on the dial and bezel. The Datejust II, which was released in 2009, has a bigger case (41mm diameter) than the standard Datejust and features an updated movement, being only available in steel with white, yellow or rose gold on an Oyster bracelet. In 2016, Rolex released the Datejust 41, which has the same 41mm diameter case as the Datejust II, however the Datejust 41 has smaller indexes and a thinner bezel compared to the Datejust II

=== Professional collections ===
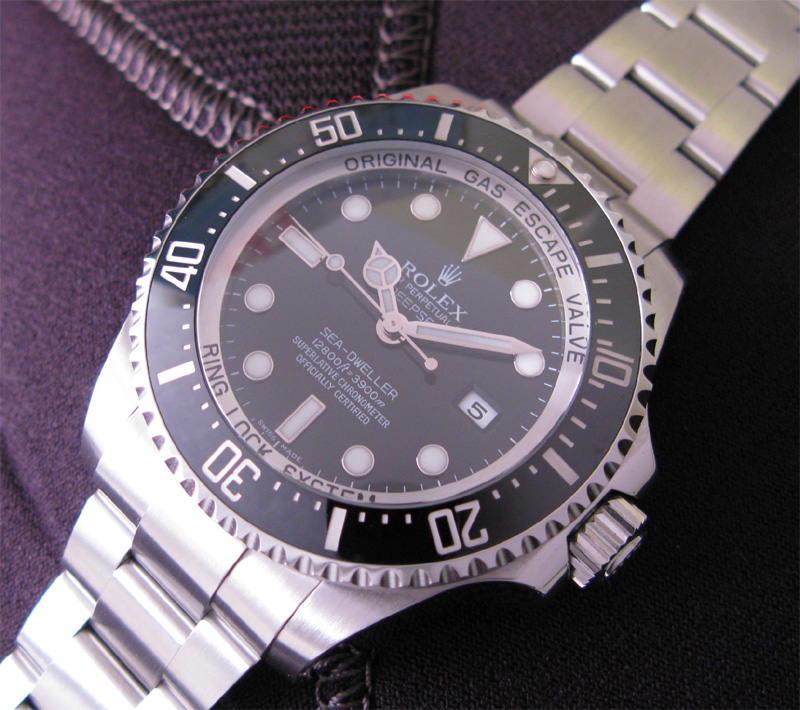
Rolex Sea Dweller Deepsea with 3,900 m depth rating (ref. 116660)

Rolex produced specific models suitable for the extremes of deep-sea diving, caving, mountain climbing, polar exploration, and aviation. Early professional models included the Rolex Submariner (1953) and the Rolex Sea Dweller (1967). The latter watch has a helium release valve to release helium gas build-up during decompression, which, according to Urs Alois Eschle, a former director of Doxa, was patented by Rolex in cooperation with Doxa.

The Explorer (1953) and Explorer II (1971) were developed specifically for explorers who would navigate rough terrain, such as the world-famous Mount Everest expeditions. Indeed, the Rolex Explorer was launched to celebrate the successful ascent of Everest in 1953 by the expeditionary team led by Sir John Hunt. (That expedition was supplied with watches from both Rolex and Smiths; it was a Smiths watch, rather than a Rolex, which Edmund Hillary wore to the summit.)

The 39 mm Rolex Explorer was designed as a "tool watch" for rugged use, hence its movement has Paraflex shock absorbers which give them higher shock resistance than other Rolex watches. The 42mm Rolex Explorer II has some significant differences from the 39mm Explorer; the Explorer II adds a date function, and an orange 24-hour hand which is paired with the fixed bezel's black 24-hour markers for situations underground or around the poles where day cannot be distinguished from night.

Another iconic model is the Rolex GMT Master (1955), originally developed at the request of Pan Am Airways to provide its crews with a dual-time watch that could be used to display local time and GMT (Greenwich Mean Time), which was the international time standard for aviation at that time (and still is in its modern variant of Universal Time Coordinated (UTC) or Zulu Time) and was needed for astronavigation (celestial navigation) during longer flights.

=== Most expensive pieces ===
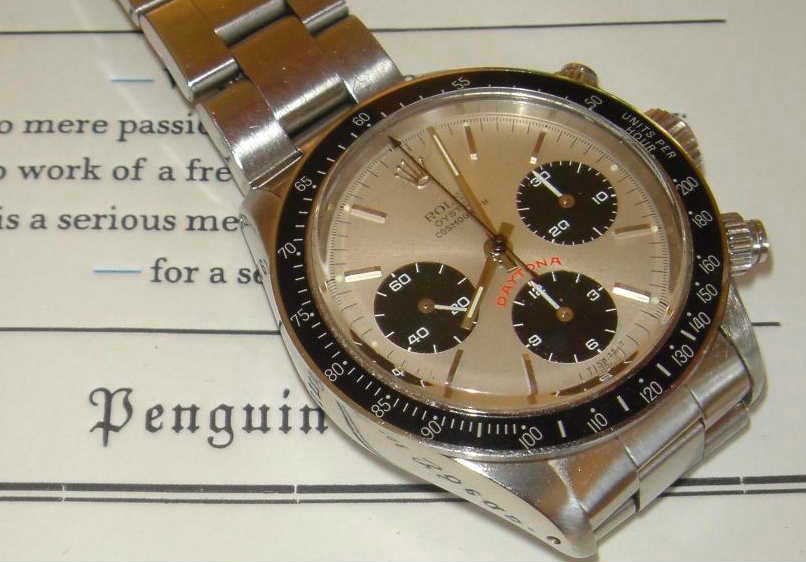
Rolex Daytona chronograph stainless steel, silver dial (ref. 6263)

- On 26 October 2017, a Rolex Daytona (Ref. 6239) wristwatch, manufactured in 1968, was sold by Phillips in its New York auction for US$17.75 million. The watch was originally purchased by Joanne Woodward in 1968 and was given by Joanne to her husband Paul Newman as a gift. The auction price set a record at $15.5 million, plus buyer's premium of 12.5%, for a final price of $17,752,500 in New York City. As of 2018, it is the most expensive wristwatch and the second most expensive watch ever sold at auction. Notably, "[a]t the time that Newman gave the watch to James Cox [as a gift], the watch was selling for about $200."
- On 28 May 2018, a Rolex Daytona "Unicorn" Ref. 6265 was sold in auction by Phillips for US$5.937 million in Geneva, making it the second most expensive Rolex timepiece ever sold at auction (as of 2018).
- On 19 October 2025, an ultra-rare Rolex Ref. 6062 was sold for a record $6.2 million at the Monaco Legend Auction, becoming the third most expensive Rolex ever sold at auction. Previously, the third position was held by the Ref. 6062 “Bao Dai,” a distinguished 1950s model once owned by the last emperor of Vietnam, which was sold for $5.06 million in 2017.
- The most expensive Rolex (in terms of retail price) ever produced by the Rolex factory was the GMT Ice reference 116769TBR with a retail price of US$485,350.

== Current model lineup ==
As of 2026 the model offering consists of two lineups.

Part of the Oyster Perpetual lineup:

- Rolex Oyster Perpetual
- Rolex Datejust
  - Rolex Lady-Datejust
- Rolex Day-Date
- Rolex Air-King
- Rolex Cosmograph Daytona
- Rolex Explorer
- Rolex Explorer II
- Rolex GMT-Master II
- Rolex Submariner
- Rolex Sea-Dweller
- Rolex Deepsea
- Rolex Sky-Dweller
- Rolex Land-Dweller
- Rolex Yacht-Master
- Rolex Yacht-Master II

Part of the Perpetual lineup:

- Rolex Padellone
- Rolex 1908

== Sponsorship ==
Since 1976, the Rolex Awards for Enterprise of 100,000 Swiss francs has been awarded; a Young Laureates award of 50,000 was added in 2010. The biennial Rolex Mentor and Protégé Arts Initiative with a grant of about $41,000 was launched in 2002.

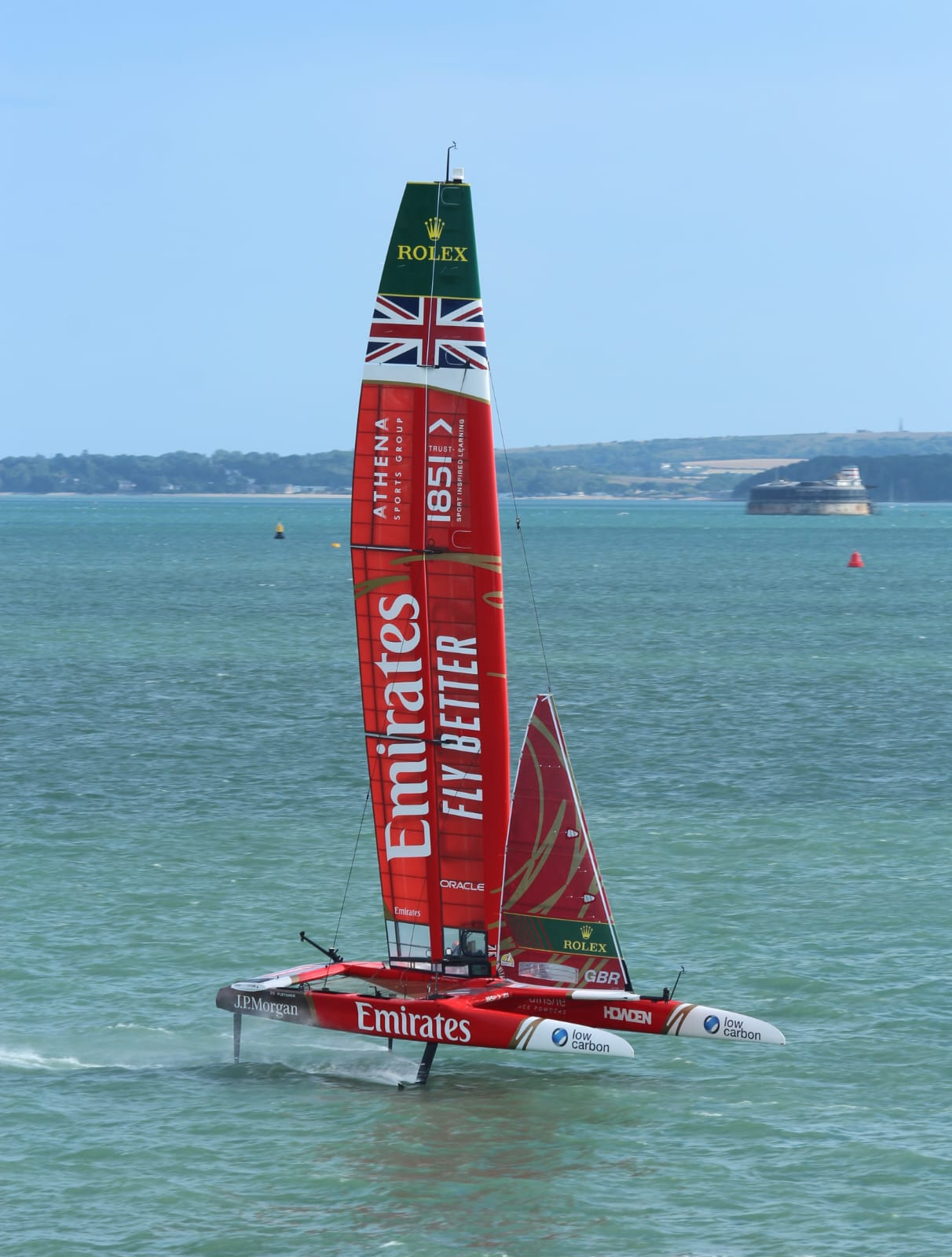
The Rolex logo appears on each team's boat in the SailGP Championship

Rolex has been the official timekeeper to the Le Mans 24 Hours motor race since 2001. They were also Formula 1's official timekeeper between 2013-2024. Former Formula 1 driver Jackie Stewart has advertised Rolex since 1968. Others who have done so for some years include Gary Player, Arnold Palmer, Roger Penske, Jean-Claude Killy, and Kiri Te Kanawa. It is also the sponsor of the Rolex International Jumping Riders Club Top 10 Final competition. For the US Open, it is one of the official partners. Rolex is also the title sponsor of SailGP.

Jacques Piccard and Don Walsh had a specially designed experimental Rolex Oyster Perpetual Deep-Sea Special strapped to the outside of their bathyscaphe during the 1960 Challenger Deep dive to a world-record depth of 10,916 metres (35,814 ft). When James Cameron conducted a similar dive in 2012, a specially designed and manufactured Rolex Oyster Perpetual Sea-Dweller Deep Sea Challenge watch was being "worn" by his submarine's robotic arm.

Mercedes Gleitze was the first British woman to swim the English Channel on 7 October 1927. However, as John E. Brozek (author of The Rolex Report: An Unauthorized Reference Book for the Rolex Enthusiast) points out in his article "The Vindication Swim, Mercedes Gleitze and Rolex take the plunge", some doubts were cast on her achievement when a hoaxer claimed to have made a faster swim only four days later. Hence Gleitze attempted a repeat swim with extensive publicity on 21 October, dubbed the "Vindication Swim". For promotional purposes, Wilsdorf offered her one of the earliest Rolex Oysters if she would wear it during the attempt. After more than 10 hours, in water that was much colder than during her first swim, she was pulled from the sea semi-conscious seven miles short of her goal. Although she did not complete the second crossing, a journalist for The Times wrote, "Having regard to the general conditions, the endurance of Miss Gleitze surprised the doctors, journalists and experts who were present, for it seemed unlikely that she would be able to withstand the cold for so long. It was a good performance." As she sat in the boat, the same journalist made a discovery and reported it as follows: "Hanging round her neck by a ribbon on this swim, Miss Gleitze carried a small gold watch, which was found this evening to have kept good time throughout." When examined closely, the watch was found to be dry inside and in perfect condition. One month later, on 24 November 1927, Wilsdorf launched the Rolex Oyster watch in the United Kingdom with a full front page Rolex advertisement in the Daily Mail.

== Achievements ==
Among the company's notable improvements and innovations are:

- In 1926, Rolex produced the Oyster case. While they claim this was the first reliable waterproof wristwatch case based on a screw-down crown, it was not: Depollier's case was patented eight years earlier. To this end, Rolex acquired the Perragaux-Perret screw-down patent, added a clutch and combined the screw-down crown with a threaded case back and bezel. Wilsdorf even had a specially made Rolex watch (the watch was called the "DeepSea") attached to the side of Trieste, which went to the bottom of the Mariana Trench. The watch survived and tested as having kept perfect time during its descent and ascent. This was confirmed by a telegram sent to Rolex the following day saying "Am happy to confirm that even at 11,000 metres your watch is as precise as on the surface. Best regards, Jacques Piccard". Earlier waterproof watches such as the "Submarine Watch" by Tavannes used other means to seal the case.
- In 1910, the first watchmaker to earn chronometer certification for a small lady wristwatch.
- In 1931, released a wristwatch winding mechanism featuring a rotor, a full 360 degrees rotating weight to power the watch by the movement of the wearer's arm. As well as making watch winding unnecessary, it also kept the power from the mainspring more consistent, resulting in more reliable timekeeping. Fully rotating weights later became part of the standard winding mechanism of self-winding wristwatches. A preceding self-winding mechanism by Harwood instead used a weight that moved in a 270 degrees arc hitting buffer springs on both sides.
- In 1945, introduced the first chronometer wristwatch with an automatically changing date on the dial (Rolex Datejust Ref. 4467). An earlier wristwatch with a date changing mechanism by Mimo was not chronometer certified.
- In 1953, released a case waterproof to 100 m (330 ft) in the Rolex Oyster Perpetual Submariner Ref. 6204. Although this has been commonly publicized as the first diving watch, in 1932 Omega had released the Marine, which could stand 135mts, 35mts more than the 1953 Rolex Submariner. Blancpain produced their Fifty Fathoms watch in 1953, 10 months before the Rolex Submariner.
- In 1954, produced a wristwatch which showed two time zones at once in the Rolex GMT Master ref. 6542. Yet again, it was not the first company to do so, as the Longines DualTime preceded the GMT by a full quarter of a century.
- In 1956, Rolex made a wristwatch with an automatically changing day and date on the dial in the Rolex Day-Date.
- In 1960, during the historic descent of Trieste into Challenger Deep, Rolex attached a specially built experimental prototype (Deep Sea Special No. 3) to the outside of the bathyscaphe. These prototypes featured oversized, high‑pressure cases (much thicker and heavier than any production wristwatch) and were strictly engineering demonstrations, not commercially wearable models. The watch survived pressures exceeding 1,100 atmospheres and performed flawlessly on return, but its size made it unsuitable for everyday use.

== Cultural impact ==
By the start of World War II, Royal Air Force pilots were buying Rolex watches to replace their inferior standard-issue watches; however, when captured and sent to prisoner of war (POW) camps, their watches were confiscated. When Hans Wilsdorf heard of this, he offered to replace all watches that had been confiscated and not require payment until the end of the war, if the officers would write to Rolex and explain the circumstances of their loss and where they were being held. Wilsdorf was in personal charge of the scheme. As a result of this, an estimated 3,000 Rolex watches were ordered by British officers in the officer camp Oflag VII-B in Bavaria alone. This had the effect of raising the morale among the Allied POWs because it indicated that Wilsdorf did not believe that the Axis powers would win the war. American servicemen heard about this when stationed in Europe during WWII and this helped open up the American market to Rolex after the war.

On 10 March 1943, while still a prisoner of war, Corporal Clive James Nutting, one of the organizers of the Great Escape, ordered a stainless steel Rolex Oyster 3525 Chronograph (valued at a current equivalent of £1,200) by mail directly from Hans Wilsdorf in Geneva, intending to pay for it with money he saved working as a shoemaker at the camp. The watch (Rolex watch no. 185983) was delivered to Stalag Luft III on 10 July that year along with a note from Wilsdorf apologising for any delay in processing the order and explaining that an English gentleman such as Corporal Nutting "should not even think" about paying for the watch before the end of the war. Wilsdorf is reported to have been impressed with Nutting because, although not an officer, he had ordered the expensive Rolex 3525 Oyster chronograph while most other prisoners ordered the much cheaper Rolex Speed King model which was popular because of its small size. The watch is believed to have been ordered specifically to be used in the Great Escape when, as a chronograph, it could have been used to time patrols of prison guards or time the 76 ill-fated escapees through tunnel 'Harry' on 24 March 1944. Eventually, after the war, Nutting was sent an invoice of only £15 for the watch, because of currency export controls in England at the time. The watch and associated correspondence between Wilsdorf and Nutting were sold at an auction for £66,000 in May 2007, while at an earlier auction in September 2006 the same watch fetched A$54,000. Nutting served as a consultant for both the 1950 film The Wooden Horse and the 1963 film The Great Escape.

In an infamous murder case, the Rolex on Ronald Platt's wrist eventually led to the arrest of his murderer, Albert Johnson Walker, a financial planner who had fled from Canada when he was charged with 18 counts of fraud, theft and money laundering. When a body was found in the English Channel in 1996 by a fisherman named John Coprik, a Rolex wristwatch was the only identifiable object on the body. Since the Rolex movement had a serial number and was engraved with special markings every time it was serviced, British police traced the service records from Rolex and identified the owner of the watch as Ronald Platt. In addition, police were able to determine the date of death by examining the date on the watch calendar. Since the Rolex movement was fully waterproof and had a reserve of two days of operation when inactive, police were able to reasonably infer the time of death.

In Singapore on 20 April 1998, a 23-year-old Malaysian named Jonaris Badlishah bludgeoned a 42-year-old beautician Sally Poh Bee Eng to death in order to steal her Rolex and later give it to his girlfriend as a birthday present. The case became known as the "Rolex watch murder". Jonaris was arrested, sentenced to death and executed.

O. J. Simpson wore a counterfeit Rolex during his 1994 murder trial.

According to the 2017 Brand Z report, the brand value is estimated at $8.053 billion. Rolex watches continue to have a reputation as status symbols. The company produces more than 1,000,000 timepieces each year.

The strict protection of Rolex’s intellectual property, combined with high price points and controlled distribution, has been analyzed by scholars as a mechanism through which the brand maintains scarcity and cultural capital.

== See also ==
- Boule de Genève
- List of watch manufacturers
- Swiss Made
- Patek Philippe
- Audemars Piguet
- Omega SA
- TAG Heuer
- Breitling SA
- Rolex Tower
- Geneva Seal
- Rolex v EUIPO

== Literature ==
- Pierre-Yves Donzé: La fabrique de l’excellence. Histoire de Rolex. Livreo Alphil, 2024, ISBN 978-2-88950-241-7. About the book (French)
