= Rolex v EUIPO =

Decision of the European Court of Justice

- Court of First Instance

Decided 18 January 2023
- Full case name: Rolex SA v European Union Intellectual Property Office (EUIPO).
- Case: T‑726/21
- CelexID: 62021TJ0726_INF
- ECLI: ECLI:EU:T:2023:6
- Case type: Review of legality of EUIPO's Board of Appeal decision

Ruling
- The General Court dismisses the action.

Court composition
- Judge Rapporteur; Dean Spielmann

Rolex v EUIPO (2023) T‑726/21 was a decision of the General Court (European Union). The case concerned an opposition, initiated by Rolex, against the registration of another trade mark.

== Facts ==
On 27 November 2014, the Danish company PWT A/S, obtained an international registration (designating the European Union) of a figurative trade mark depicting a black crown. The mark was registered for the following goods: clothing, footwear, headgear.

Rolex, which already had a trade mark of a black crown (for watches), filed an opposition against the registration on two grounds:

- There exists a likelihood of confusion between the two signs, which means that the contested sign and the earlier trade mark are identical or very similar, and are used for identical or very similar goods or services, so that the relevant public will be confused about the economic origin of the goods or service (Article 8(1)(b) EUTMR, formerly Regulation No 207/2009).
- There exists an injury to the reputation of the earlier trade mark, which means that the contested sign is identical or very similar to the earlier trade mark with a reputation (irrespective of the similarity between the goods or services), and where the use of it would injure the reputation of, take unfair advantage of, or be detrimental to the earlier trade mark (Article 8(5) EUTMR).

On 19 October 2020, the Opposition Division of the European Union Intellectual Property Office (EUIPO) upheld the opposition, which led to PWT A/S filing an appeal.

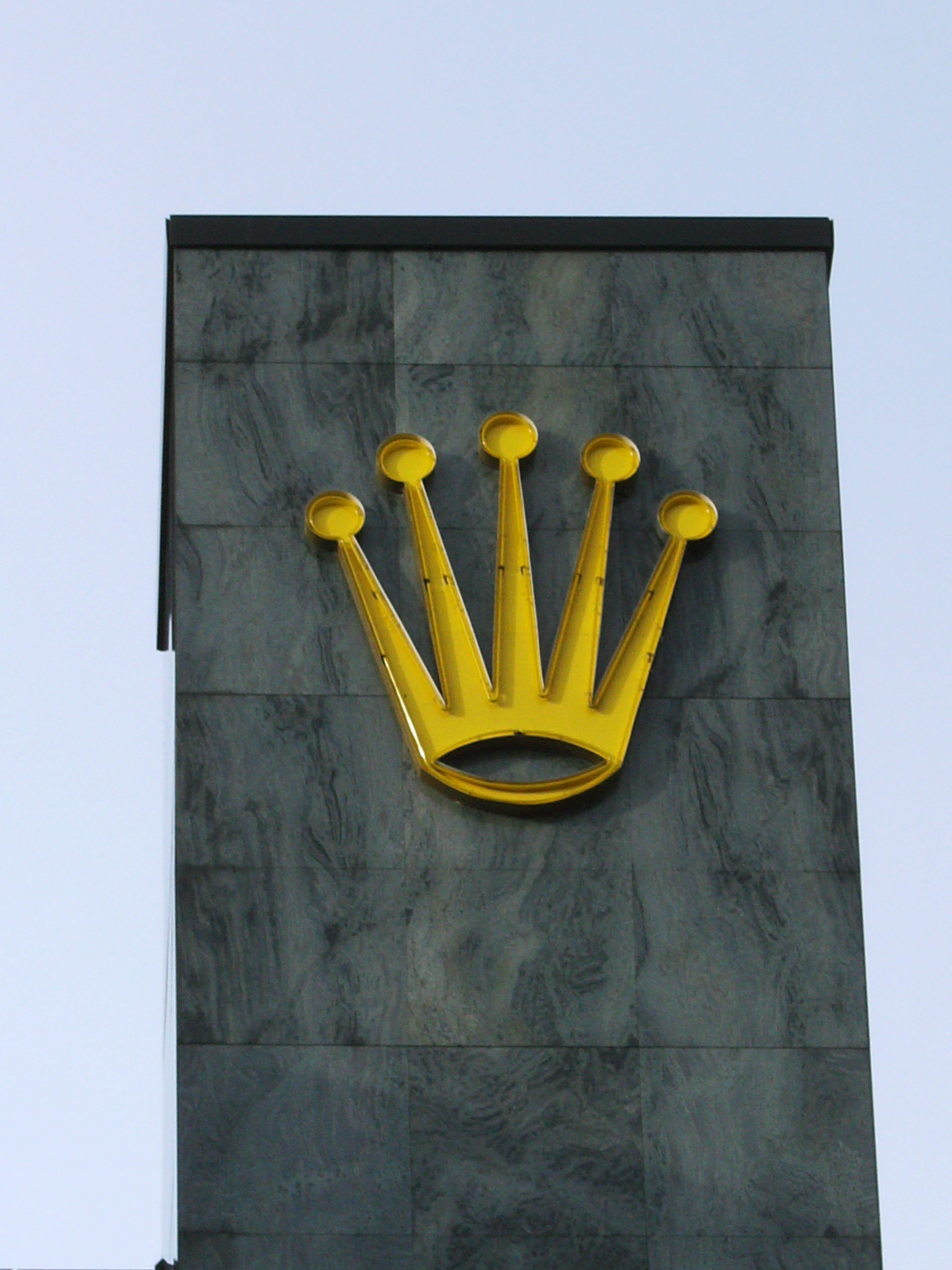
The Rolex crown, subject of the dispute

On 25 August 2021, the Board of Appeal of the EUIPO changed the direction towards PWT A/S and rejected the opposition of Rolex. On the first ground, the Board found that "watches" and "clothing, footwear, headgear" were dissimilar, and thus found that there was no likelihood of confusion. On the second ground, it found that there was no reputation established of the earlier purely figurative mark, only for the composite mark (a black crown together with the word ROLEX). Besides this, the Board found that the two signs were not similar, meaning that "the relevant public would not make a link between those marks, with the result that no risk of injury to the reputation of the earlier composite mark was established".

With this rejection, Rolex decided to bring the decision of the Board before the General Court.

== Judgment ==
Overall, the General Court confirmed the decision of the Board of Appeal.

With regard to Article 8(1)(b) EUTMR, the Court confirms the Board's decision on the dissimilarity of the goods at issue, meaning that there can be no likelihood of confusion. It refers to various cases to express that "jewellery and watches, even precious stones, on the one hand, and items of clothing, on the other, could not be regarded as similar". The Court also clarifies that the fact the goods in question are sold in the same commercial establishments is irrelevant, and pointed out that the goods are not "competitive".

With regard to Article 8(5) EUTMR, the Court determined that Rolex did not provide any evidence of an injury or injuries caused to the earlier mark. An injury may take one of three forms, namely: (i) the use, without due cause, of the mark applied for is detrimental to the distinctive character of the earlier mark; (ii) it is detrimental to the repute of the earlier mark; or (iii) it takes unfair advantage of the distinctive character or the repute of the earlier mark. The existence or possible risk of an injury is, however, one of the cumulative conditions for the application of Article 8(5).
