= Rolex GMT Master II =

Part of the Rolex Professional Watch Collection

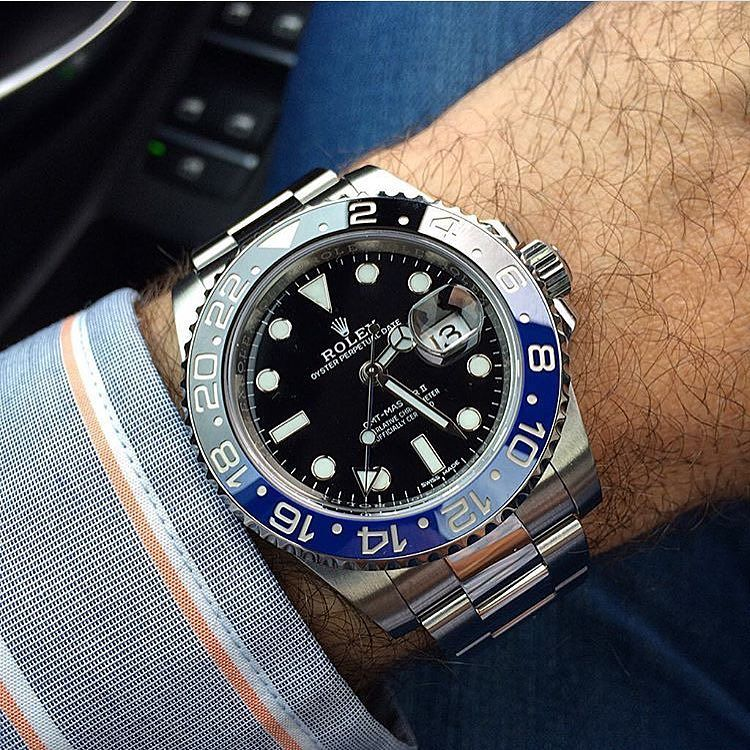
- The Rolex GMT Master II 116710BLNR, produced from 2013 to 2019
- Manufacturer: Rolex
- Type: Automatic
- Display: Analogue
- Introduced: 1955

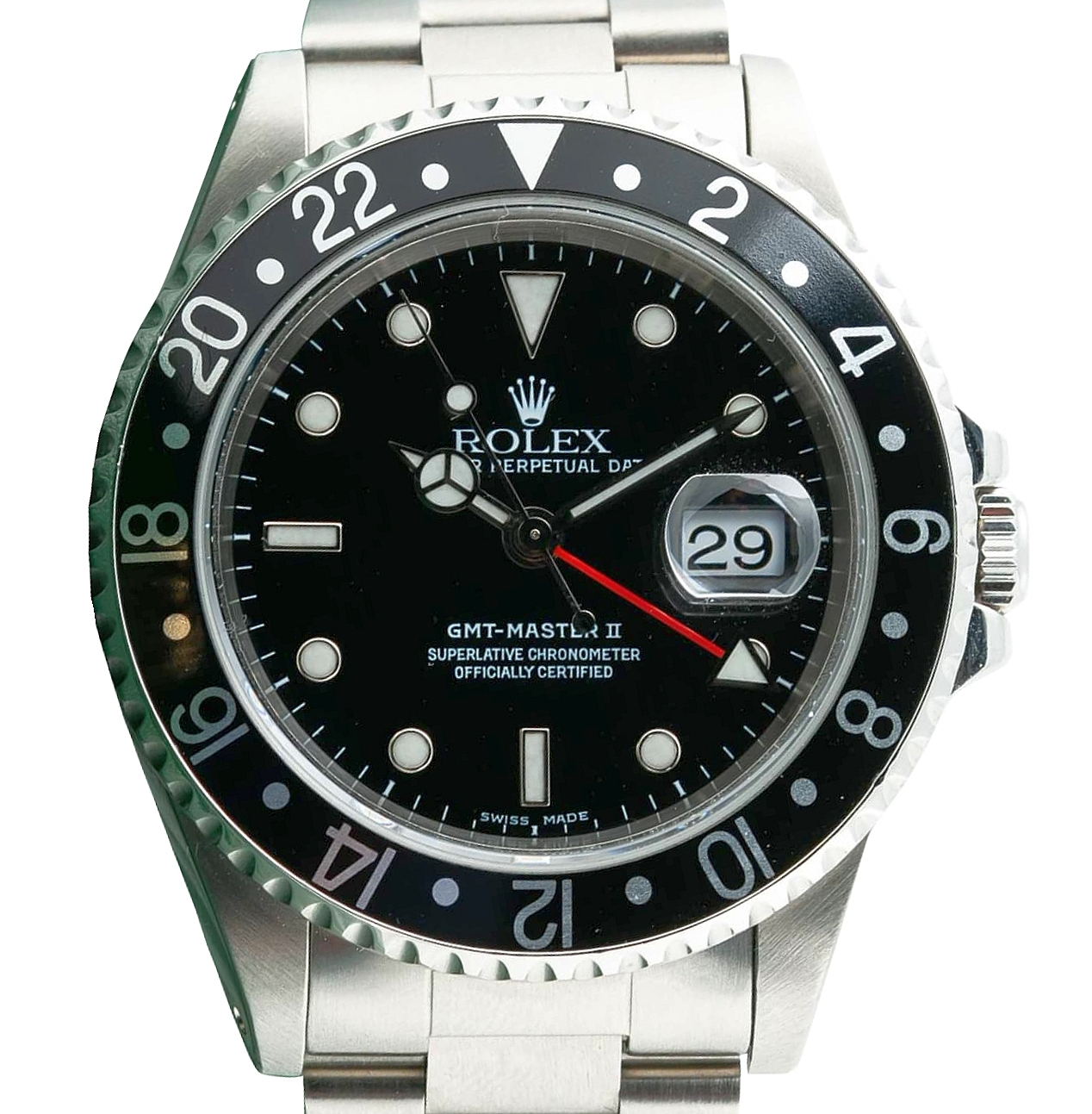
Rolex GMT Master II stainless steel (ref. 16710)

The Rolex Oyster Perpetual Date GMT Master is part of the Rolex Professional Watch Collection. Designed in collaboration with the now defunct U.S.-based Pan Am airline for use by their pilots and navigators, it was launched in 1954.

== History ==
By 1954, Rolex had gained a reputation and following amongst military pilots, many of whom chose to privately purchase the brand's watches. Pan American Airways's senior navigator, decorated World War II Captain Frederick Libby, was tasked with nominating a company to work on a watch which would always show 'GMT' time (Greenwich Mean Time), alongside the local time, to aid navigation on transoceanic flights. Libby had worn a Rolex during World War II and since, and so chose the brand.

The partnership resulted in the GMT-Master Ref. 6542 which featured an independent 24-hour hand complication, and a rotating bezel split into red and blue, the brand colors associated with the airline, color-coded for day (red) and night (blue).

The watch was issued to every pilot and navigator in Pan Am, and remained their official watch until the airline declared bankruptcy and ceased operations in 1991.

=== GMT Master II ===
In 1982, Rolex introduced the GMT-Master II, which utilized the caliber 3085 that decouples the 12-hour and 24-hour hands. This allows the 12-hour hand to be 'jumped' in one hour increments in either direction, without completely stopping the movement.

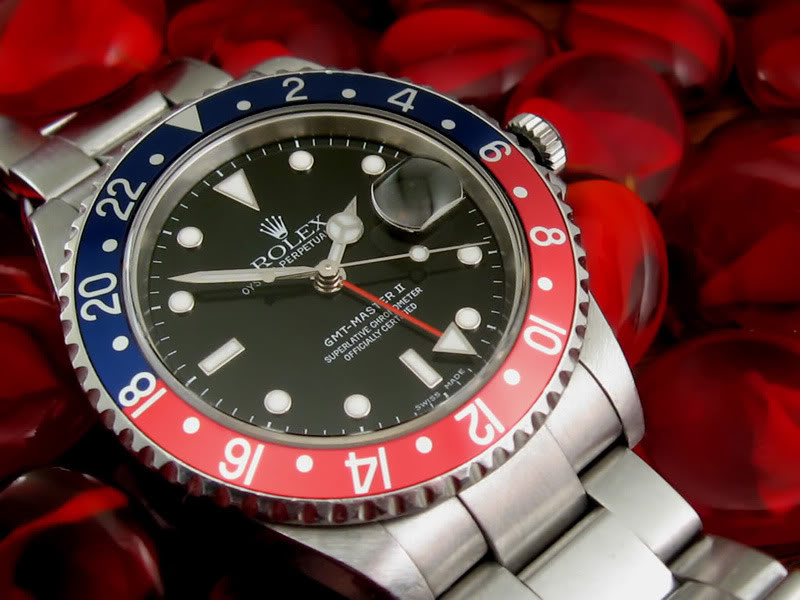
Picture of the model 16710, K-serial, "Pepsi" (model year 2001)

==== 50th anniversary edition ====
An updated Rolex GMT Master II was released in 2005. This new model features a number of technical changes, such as Rolex's patented Parachrom hairspring as well as a larger Triplock crown (from the diver's watches). The new model also has several cosmetic changes, such as larger case, hands and hour markers and also a new bezel made using an extremely hard ceramic material that is designed to be more scratch and fade resistant. Also included in the update is a new and more luxurious style of bracelet that has heavier solid links and a machined clasp. The stainless steel version now joins the precious metal versions by having highly polished centre links on its bracelet.

==== Ceramic bezel models ====
In 2007, Rolex introduced the ceramic bezel insert to the GMT-Master II range, replacing the aluminum insert (colors created using an anodizing process) that had been used since 1959. While ceramic is much more scratch resistant than aluminum, Rolex initially could not continue to produce the two-color bezel used to distinguish between the day and night times of the second time zone, particularly the color red which could not be created satisfactorily in ceramic.

It would now seem based on a recent patent issued to Rolex (2024), that the red ceramic bezel bleed has been overcome, indicating a red and black ceramic bezel "coke" may return in the future. In early 2026, ahead of the Watches and Wonders 2026 Conference, the "Pepsi" (red and blue bezel) was a discontinueed mode at Authorised Dealers, and removed from the Rolex and associated dealer websites.

In 2013, Rolex created the first two-tone ceramic bezel, in blue and black, for the steel GMT-Master II nicknamed "Batman". The blue and black bezel is made of Cerachrom, Rolex's patented version of ceramic; it is produced through a patented process of creating two colors out of a mono-block Cerachrom bezel.

In 2014, Rolex was able to create the red color on the ceramic bezel for the new incarnation of the red-and-blue "Pepsi", although in order to recoup the higher cost of this bezel it was only initially available on the white gold GMT-Master II. All of these GMT-Master II watches use the Caliber 3186 movement.

In 2018, Rolex would issue the red-and-blue "Pepsi" on a new steel GMT-Master II, which also has a Jubilee bracelet in lieu of the Oyster bracelet, and it will continue to be sold alongside the older white gold "Pepsi" watch. Two more GMT-Master II models were also introduced, one in red Everose gold and in steel, and another in Everose gold, both with a two-tone brown and black bezel giving them the nickname "Root Beer". These new GMT-Master IIs released in 2018 all use the new Caliber 3285 movement which adds Paraflex shock absorber and a 70-hour power reserve (instead of 48 hours) over the Caliber 3186.

In 2019, Rolex issued a new version of the Batman, and discontinued the older version. The caliber was upgraded to the Caliber 3285 movement. The bracelet was changed to a Jubilee, which has five-piece links and an Oysterclasp lock.

In 2021, Rolex re-issued the Oyster bracelet as an option for both the red-and-blue "Pepsi" and the blue-and-black "Batman" in addition to the existing Jubilee that was released in 2018 and 2019, respectively. This came as quite a surprise for fans, as the original ceramic "Pepsi" came on the Oyster with a black dial, making it an exclusive choice. The only distinguishing feature for the newer white gold model is the blue or meteorite dial, however the differences in appearance for the 2014 white gold and the 2021 steel is the movement.

In 2022, Rolex released a brand new colour way for the model with a green and black bezel. This model was also the first to feature a 'destro' configuration with the crown on the left-hand-side of the case.

In 2024, Rolex announced another colour configuration for the model with a black-and-gray Cerachrom bezel.

In 2025, Rolex revealed a variation of the green and black bezel model in white gold with a green ceramic dial, the first ceramic dial ever featured on a Rolex.

In 2026, Rolex discontinued the original red and blue colour way. Although Rolex did not confirm the discontinuation, reporting indicated this was a decision taken by the company which reflected the challenges of combining the colours on the bezel.

== Notable wearers ==
The GMT Master and GMT Master II have been worn by a variety of notable individuals throughout history and in media including:

- King Harald V of Norway wore a GMT Master 1675 he was given in 1962 daily until his death
- In the 1964 film, Goldfinger, Honor Blackman's character Pussy Galore, a pilot, wore a GMT-Master.
- Revolutionary Che Guevera - the watch was removed from his wrist upon his death by CIA officer and soldier Félix Rodríguez.
- Musicians Bruce Springsteen and John Mayer have been frequently spotted wearing the black and blue ("Batman") ceramic model.
- Emirati politician Mohammed bin Rashid Al Maktoum commissioned a special edition with his signature on the dial. The watch was auctioned in 2015 for $171,000.
- Marlon Brando's character in Apocalypse Now wore a GMT Master with the bezel removed. This watch was auctioned for $1.61 million in 2019.
- Jonas Venture Sr. left a GMT Master II in the care of his friend Ben, to be given to his eventual grandson, Hank Venture.

== Related pages ==
- Rolex Daytona – Wristwatch model by Rolex
- Rolex Day-Date – COSC certified, self-winding chronometer manufactured by Rolex
- Rolex Datejust – Wristwatch manufactured by Rolex
- Rolex Milgauss – Wristwatch model by Rolex
- Rolex Sea Dweller – Line of watches by Rolex
- Rolex Submariner – Line of sports watches by Rolex
- Rolex Yacht-Master – Luxury sports watch by Rolex
- Rolex Explorer II – Self-winding Swiss made wristwatch
