= Rolex Explorer =

Line of sports watches

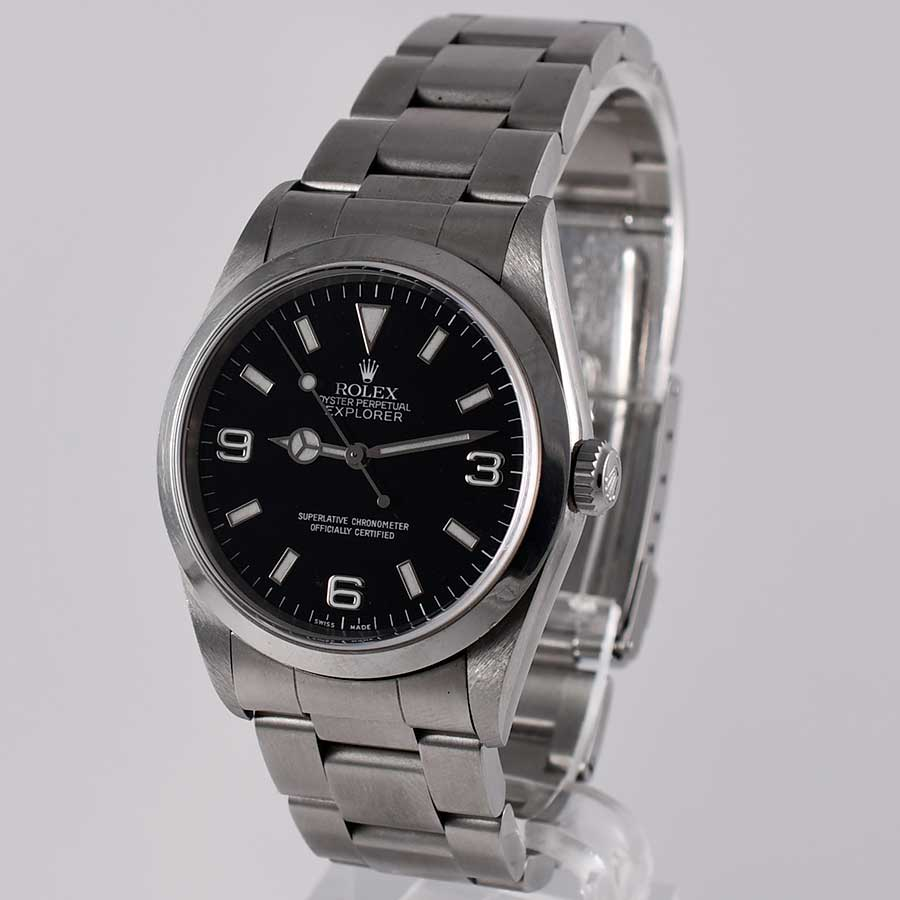
- Rolex Explorer ref. 14270, produced from 1989 to 2001.
- Manufacturer: Rolex
- Type: Automatic
- Display: Analogue
- Introduced: 1953

The Rolex Explorer is a line of sports watches manufactured by Rolex, introduced in 1953. It is self-winding, water-resistant and was originally designed as a tool watch to aid mountaineers.

== History ==
By 1953, the Rolex Oyster Perpetual had gained a reputation as a reliable, rugged wristwatch which offered water-resistance and an automatic, self-winding movement. Rolex were also actively engaged in sponsoring athletes and adventurers such as Mercedes Gleitze, the first British woman to swim the English channel, and Sir Malcolm Campbell, who broke the land speed record.

That year, the company sponsored the Everest expedition by Sir Edmund Hillary and Tenzing Norgay, which included the provision of a Rolex watch to be worn and returned for testing, with the goal of creating the 'ultimate mountaineer's tool watch', capable of surviving both low-pressure altitude and low temperatures.

The two climbers became the first people to stand at the summit of Mount Everest, and the expedition gained attention as the first successful ascent of Mount Everest. Later that year, Rolex formally introduced the Explorer, the reference 6350 which featured the moniker 'Explorer' on the dial.

Ref. 6150 Explorers were issued to the Royal Navy as dive watches in 1953, being replaced by Rolex Submariners the following year.

== Variants ==
To commemorate Project Mercury, the Rolex released a limited edition of the watch, replacing 'Explorer' on the dial with 'Space Dweller' as Japan-only model.

In 1971, Rolex introduced a variant of the Explorer, the Explorer II, which featured a fixed 24-hour bezel, and independent 24-hour hand to aid cave explorers in distinguishing between day and night.

For the first time, in 2010, Rolex increased the diameter of the Explorer case to 39mm. This model was produced until 2021, at which point Rolex re-introduced the 36mm model, alongside a bimetal variation. Since 2023, Rolex has offered the watch in both 36mm and 40mm variations.

== Notable wearers ==
The author of the James Bond series, Ian Fleming, wore a ref. 1016. The watch was exhibited in 2010.
