= Rubber B =

- Company type: Private
- Industry: Luxury watch accessories
- Founded: 2010
- Founder: Arnaud Benjamin
- Headquarters: Miami Beach, Florida
- Area served: Worldwide
- Products: Vulcanized rubber watch straps, Connected straps
- Website: rubberb.com

Rubber B is an American company that designs and sells vulcanized rubber watch straps for luxury mechanical timepieces. It is headquartered in Miami Beach, Florida.

Founded in 2010, Rubber B manufactures its products in Switzerland and is known for developing rubber straps for watch models of brands such as Rolex and Panerai.

== History ==
Rubber B was founded in Switzerland by Arnaud Benjamin. It began producing rubber straps designed as alternatives to traditional metal bracelets for luxury watches.

In April 2011, Rubber B launched its initial collection of vulcanized rubber watch straps. The first straps were designed specifically for Rolex Daytona and Rolex Submariner models and featured a "blocked integration" method. A year later, in 2012, Rubber B introduced rubber straps for Panerai (Luminor models) and Patek Philippe watches, notably the Nautilus.

From 2013 to 2015, Rubber B introduced a strap designed specifically for the Rolex Deepsea Sea-Dweller.

Between 2016 and 2018, Rubber B developed straps for additional watch brands such as Breitling, Omega, IWC, and the Apple Watch. The company also introduced straps compatible with new GMT-Master II and Air-King models, and added bands designed for dive watches.

From 2019 to 2021, Rubber B introduced a new series named "SwimSkin". Rubber B produced SwimSkin straps for several Submariner, GMT-Master, and Daytona models. During this period, Rubber B also developed straps for newer watch models, such as Tudor's Black Bay Fifty-Eight.

== Products ==
Rubber B produces vulcanized rubber straps calibrated for specific luxury watch references, maintaining compatibility with the original deployant. In 2025, Rubber B introduced Rubber B Connected, a series of straps with embedded NFC chips, which are integrated to specific Rolex watch models.
