= VPH =

VPH may refer to:

- Veterinary public health
- Vibrations per hour
- Virtual Physiological Human
- Volatile petroleum hydrocarbons in total petroleum hydrocarbon
