= Rolex Yacht-Master II =

Sport watch by Rolex

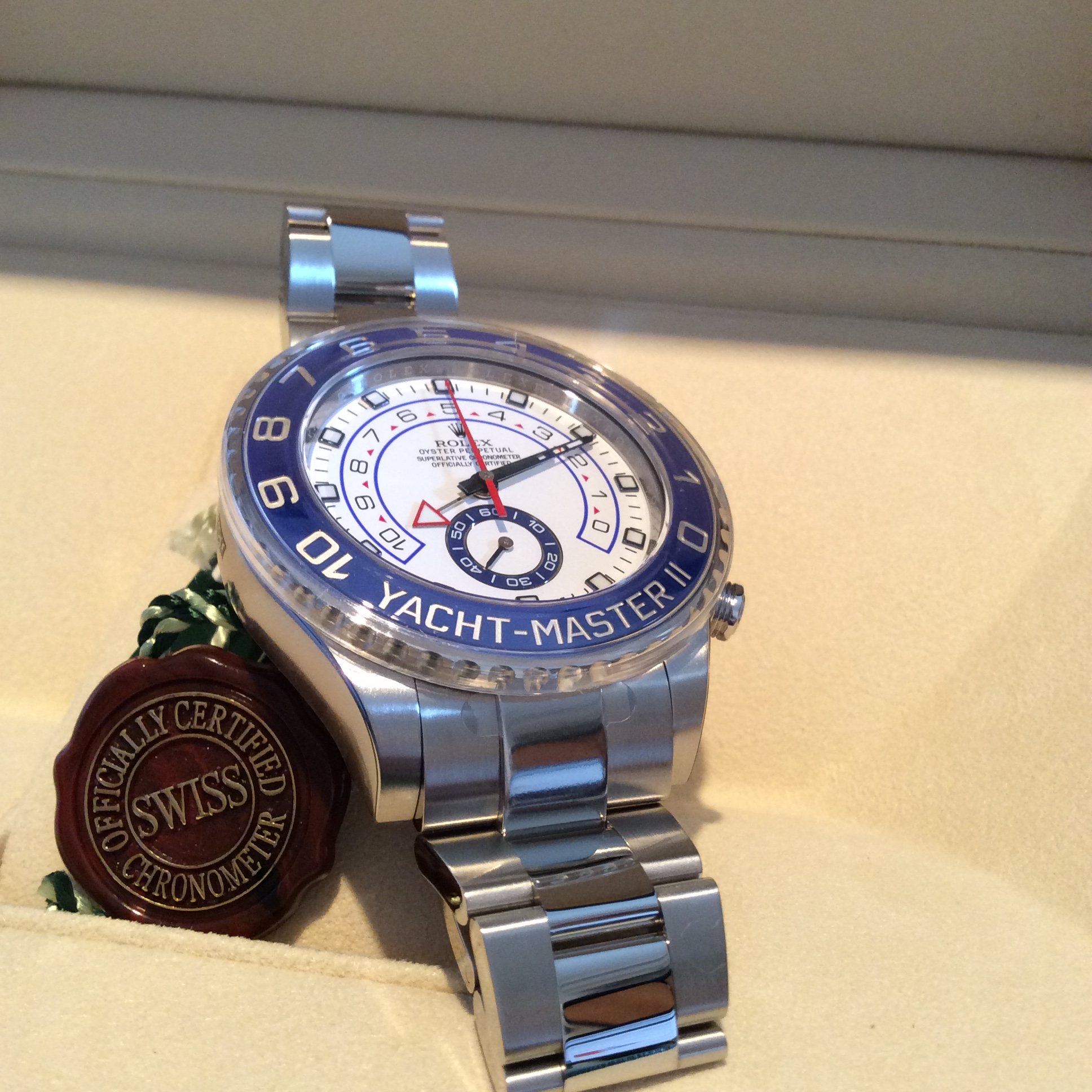
- Yacht-Master II (116680) with COSC swing tag, stickers, and bezel protector attached
- Type: Automatic
- Display: Analogue
- Introduced: 2010-2024, 2026-

The Rolex Yacht-Master II is a sport chronograph watch made by Rolex. The Yacht-Master II's countdown mechanism is primarily designed for regattas, giving it considerably different functionality than the smaller Rolex Yacht-Master.

== First generation ==
The first generation was unveiled in 2007 and made available in March 2010 with the models 116688 (Yellow Gold) and 116689 (White Gold). One year later, in 2011, Rolex introduced the model 116681 which was made from steel and everose gold. At Baselworld 2013, the watch was available for the first time in 904L steel, the model 116680, fitted with a Cerachrom bezel insert in blue ceramic. Originally, the Yacht-Master II used Rolex's 4160 movement but with the introduction of the model 116680 in 2013, the movement was updated to the 4161 movement specifically designed for the Yacht-Master II. All Yacht-Master II watches have a case size of 44mm.

The first generation Yacht-Master II was discontinued in April 2024.

=== 4161 Movement ===
The Rolex 4161 movement is a chronograph movement with the complication of a programmable timer that counts down ten minutes. The countdown mechanism was primarily designed for regattas where the Starting sequence can last up to ten minutes, although this is extremely rare to see a deviation from a 5-minute starting sequence. Typically an inshore or coastal regatta starting sequence is 5 minutes, with a further 5 minute warning given; the previous starting sequence being the 5 minute warning for the upcoming starting sequence. The additional 5-minute warning is important as boats take time to maneuver and one's position on the starting line often yields significant tactical advantages during the first half of the race. The movement took 35,000 hours (nearly four years) to create and is made up from 360 parts. The movement also has a 72-hour power reserve for when the watch is inactive.

The countdown mechanism is constructed using a column wheel that extends through the main plate and a vertical clutch. The mechanism makes it possible for the wearer to program in advance of the official countdown time and then start the timer once the countdown has begun, and the mechanism can be programmed to count down 0 to 10 minutes. The countdown feature can be locked and unlocked by twisting the bezel through 90 degrees. The Yacht-Master II was one of the first watches in the world to have a bezel that worked in conjunction with the movement.

If the wearer has started the countdown either too early or too late, then the countdown can be synchronized. By pressing the start/stop button, located at the 2 o'clock position, and then pressing the reset button, located at the 4 o'clock position, the minute countdown hand repositions itself to the nearest minute while the seconds countdown hand returns to 0.

=== Design ===
All Yacht-Master II models, regardless of metal variants, have a case diameter of 44mm. The bezel has a blue Cerachrom insert apart from on the model 116689 which is exclusively platinum. All Yacht-Masters have a screwdown, Triplock crown and a sapphire crystal designed to be scratch-resistant.

The bracelet on all models is an Oyster design with three-element links. The centre link is either polished or gold depending on the model. The clasp has a 5mm extension link built in.

== Second generation ==
The second generation Yacht-Master II was announced in April 2026. It will be available in Oystersteel (126680) and 18ct yellow gold (126688), with a size of 44mm (and 13.9mm thick) with 100 meters of water resistance. The movement is the Rolex caliber 4162 automatic chronograph movement with a column wheel and vertical clutch, ticking at 4 Hz with a 72-hour power reserve.

Unlike the first generation uses the Ring Command bezel for the regatta timing function, the second generation has a standard bi-directional timing bezel made of blue Cerachrom and a new pusher-driven user interface for the regatta timing function.
