= Zenith (watchmaker) =

Swiss luxury watchmaker

- Type: Wholly owned subsidiary
- Industry: Luxury watches
- Founded: 1865; 161 years ago in Le Locle, Switzerland
- Founder: Georges Favre-Jacot
- Headquarters: Le Locle, Switzerland
- Area served: Worldwide
- Key people: Benoit de Clerck (current CEO)
- Parent: LVMH
- Website: www.zenith-watches.com

Zenith SA is a French-owned Swiss luxury watch manufacturing subsidiary of LVMH. The company was founded in 1865 by Georges Favre-Jacot in Le Locle in the canton of Neuchâtel and is one of the oldest continuously operating watchmakers. Zenith was purchased by LVMH in November 1999, becoming one of several brands in its watch and jewellery division, which includes TAG Heuer and Hublot. Benoit de Clerck is the company's current president and CEO.

== History ==
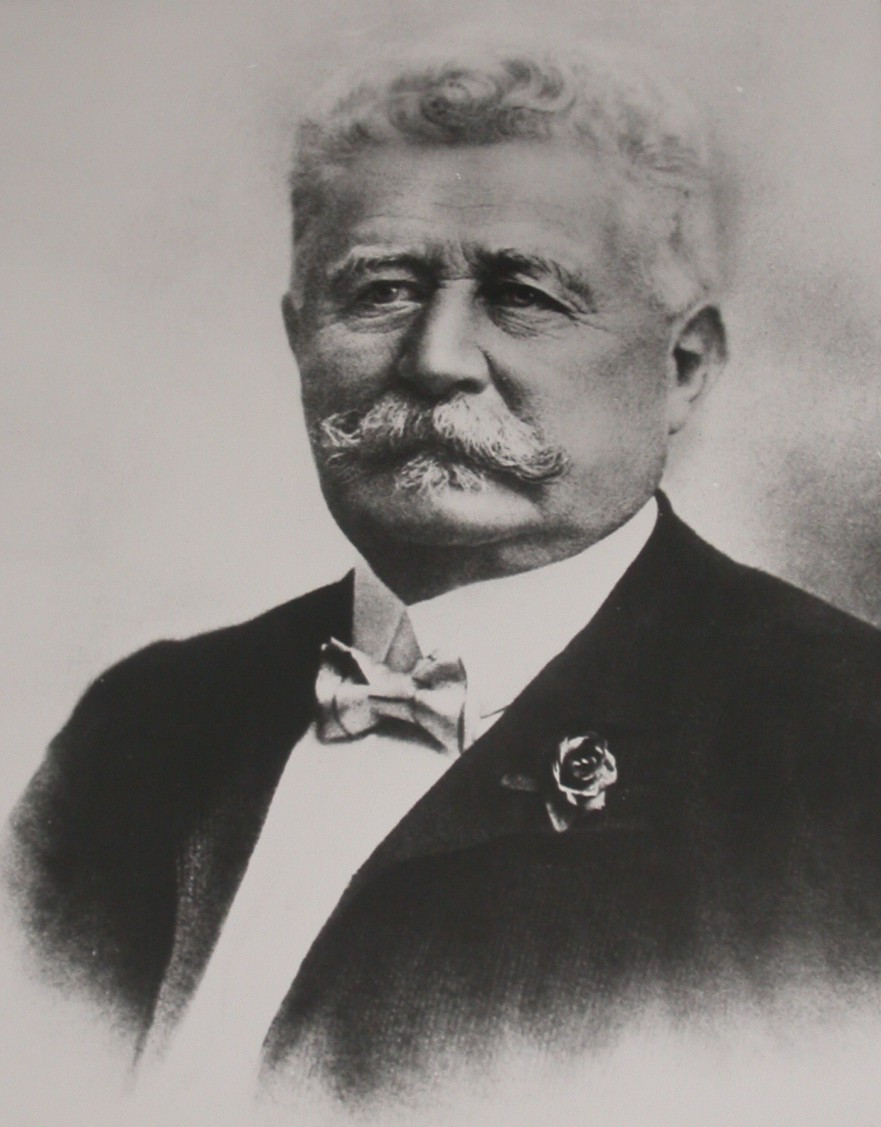
Georges Favre-Jacot

Georges Favre-Jacot began making watches in Le Locle in 1865. A visit to the Centennial Exposition in Philadelphia in 1876 introduced him to the factory methods used by American watchmakers, and he later brought those manufacturing process to a factory at Le Locle. The firm won a Grand Prix at the 1900 Paris World's Fair and took the name Fabrique des Montres Zenith S.A. in 1912. Its later work placed increased emphasis on precision movements. These included the Calibre 26x series of the 1920s and, after the Second World War, the Calibre 135. A competition version of the 135, the Calibre 135-O, (Note: The "O" stands for "Observatory".) won five Neuchâtel Observatory prizes from 1950 to 1954. Calibre 135 was brought back during a 2022 collaboration with Finnish watchmaker Kari Voutilainen, where it was used in 11 watches, each having a new old stock movement. To further support vertical integration of watch manufacturing, Zenith purchased movement maker Martel in 1959.

Due to ongoing naming disputes with Zenith Electronics, the company was unable to achieve a sizeable market share in the United States. In 1968, Zenith merged with Movado (and later Mondia as Movado-Zenith-Mondia) to sell in the United States under the already established Movado brand. With the popularity of quartz watches increasing, Zenith Radio Company decided to enter the market in 1972 through acquisition of Zenith, joining the two companies of the same name. It was during this ownership that production of mechanical movements was halted and the production shifted to quartz movements, and the company was put up for sale in 1978. Dixi, who already had purchased other Swiss watchmakers, purchased Movado-Zenith-Mondia from Zenith Radio Company in 1978 under the leadership of Paul Castella. While other brands slowly shuttered production due to the quartz crisis, Zenith was continuing to produce wristwatches, albeit with financial difficulties. As automatic movements came back into demand, Ebel (and later Rolex) sourced the El Primero movement for their own chronograph timepieces, which supported the brand. In 1999, as watch consortiums (led by Swatch Group) acquired brands, LVMH purchased Zenith for US$48.4 million. In total, Zenith has won over 2,300 prizes for chronometry.

=== Movements ===
==== El Primero ====
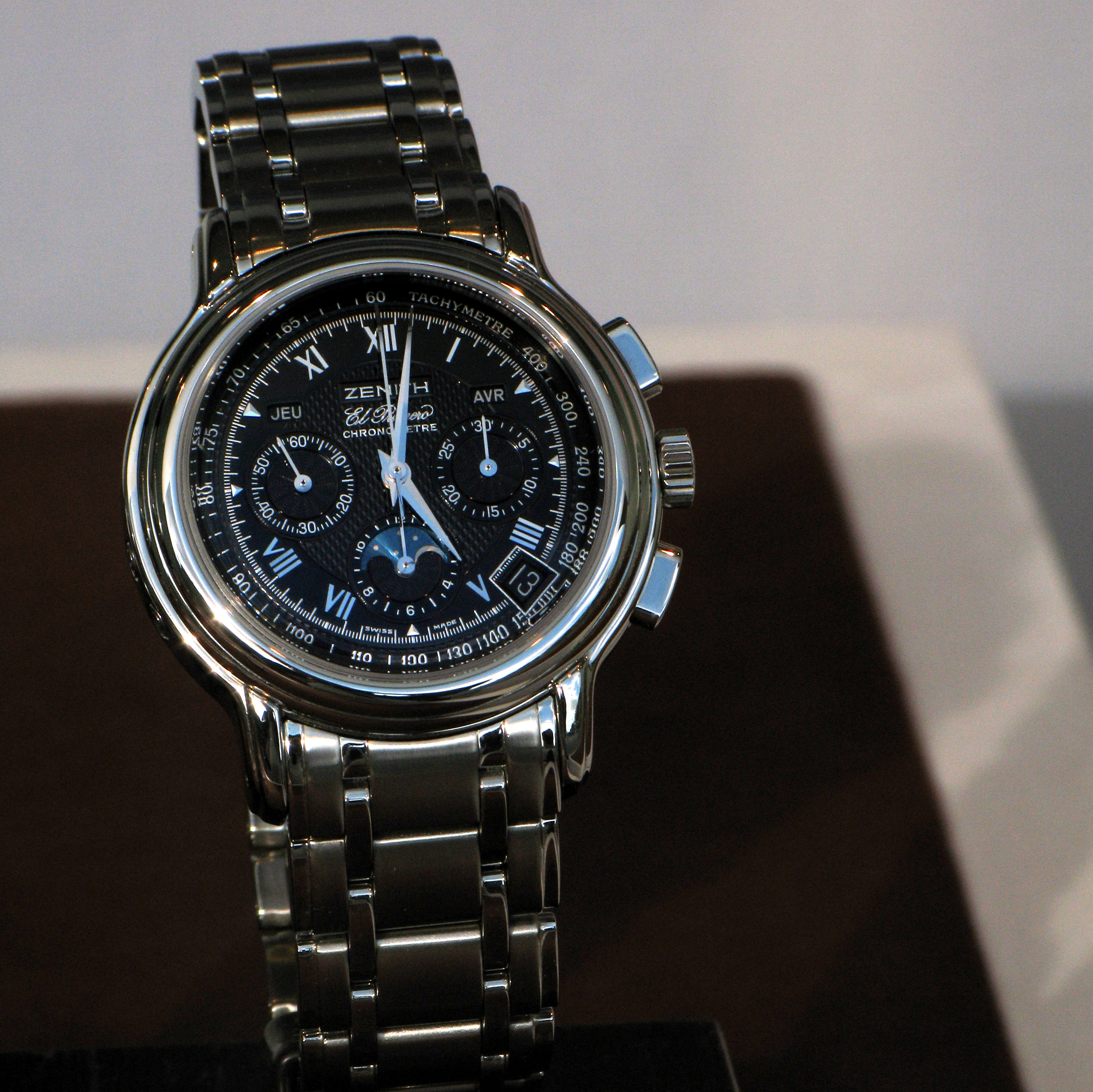
Zenith El Primero

In 1962, Zenith started working on an automatic chronograph movement that was to commemorate the watchmaker's 100th anniversary. El Primero calibre, when it was first unveiled on 10 January 1969, was the first high frequency automatic chronograph movement. One of the watchmakers who worked on the movement, Charles Vermot, preserved the calibre when the owners of the brand decided to abandon the idea of a mechanical chronograph and focus on quartz timepieces. While all the tools used to manufacture the calibre were being dumped or sold, Vermot hid the necessary equipment in the Ponts-de-Martel facility's attic. The movement has over 70 versions since its inception in 1969.

The movement was one of the first automatic chronograph movements and has a frequency of 36,000 vibrations per hour (vph; equivalent to 5 Hz) because, in watchmaking, a vibration is one half-oscillation of the balance wheel. Rolex used El Primero from 1988 to 2000 for the Rolex Daytona chronograph. El Primero movement's high rate allows a resolution of 1/10 of a second and a potential for greater positional accuracy over the more common standard frequency of 28,800 vph (4 Hz). El Primero was given a 2012 limited release of El Primero Stratos Flyback Striking 10th, with 1,969 pieces available, referring to the original 1969 release date.

==== Elite ====
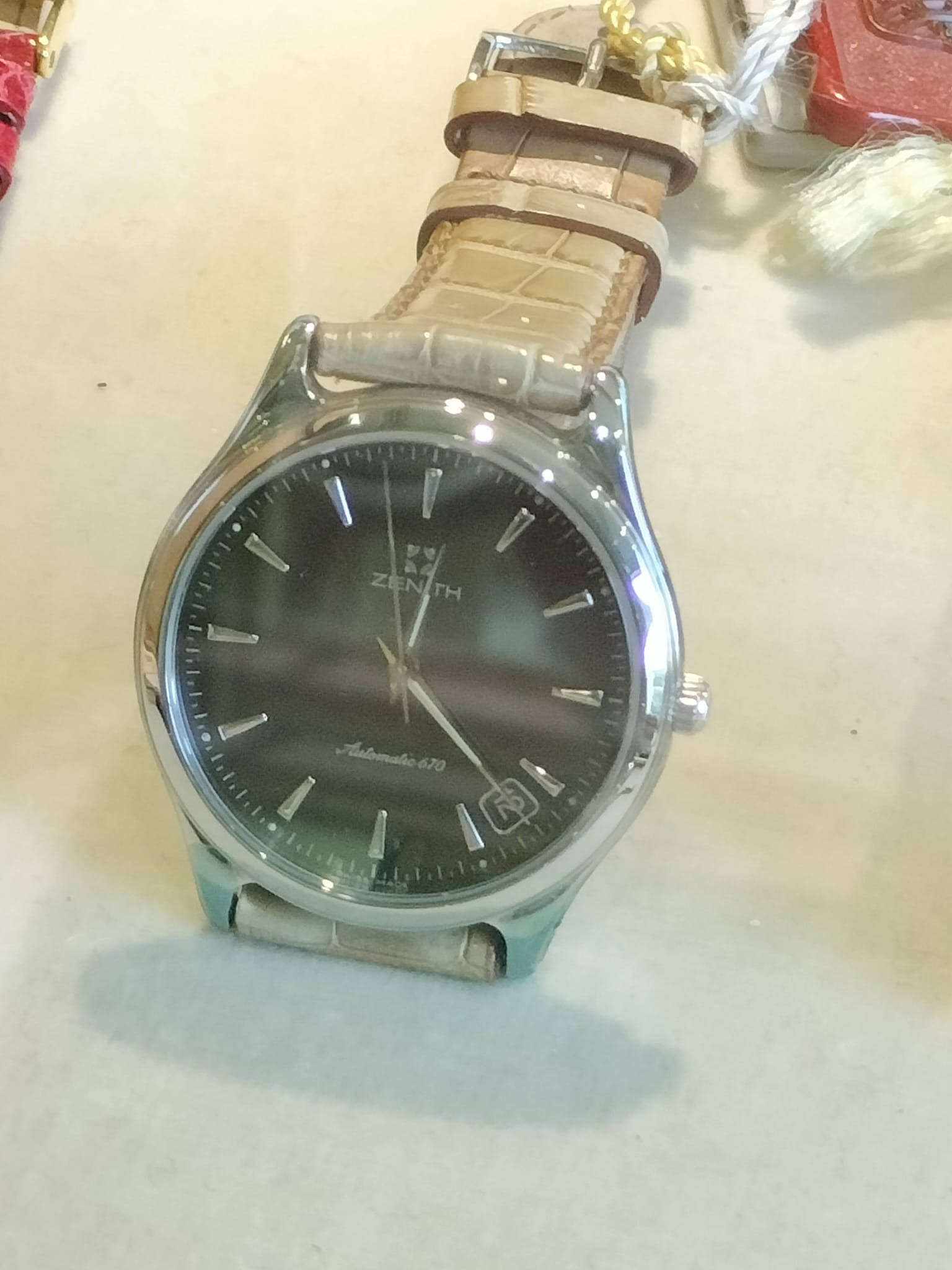
Zenith Elite with Zenith 670, an automatic calibre

In 1991, Zenith started to develop a modular, slim, adaptable, and multipurpose in-house movement that could be housed within a wide variety of timepieces across their various collections. Led by technical director Jean-Pierre Gerber, the company created a thin movement with a diameter of 40.5 mm. Operating at 28,800 vibrations per hour (4 Hz), it was awarded the title of "Best Movement of the Year" when introduced at Baselworld in 1994. The first wristwatches to include the movement were released in a similarly named Elite collection, which remain a feature of the present-day collection. Additionally, the movement has been a feature of the Defy collection.

Under Jean-Frédéric Dufour's tenure as CEO, the company decided to replace the Elite movement in their entry-level wristwatches with a more economical Sellita movement, and further manufacture a double-barrel version of the Elite for higher-end models. Upon Dufour's departure to Rolex in 2014, incoming CEO Aldo Magada reversed this decision, and the Elite is still being built by the company today.

== Collections ==
Currently, Zenith has the following collections:

- Defy
- Chronomaster
- G.F.J. (named after the company's founder Georges Favre-Jacot)
- Elite
- Pilot

== See also ==
- List of watch manufacturers
- Manufacture d'horlogerie
- History of clockmaking in Besançon
