= Rolex Milgauss =

Wristwatch model by Rolex

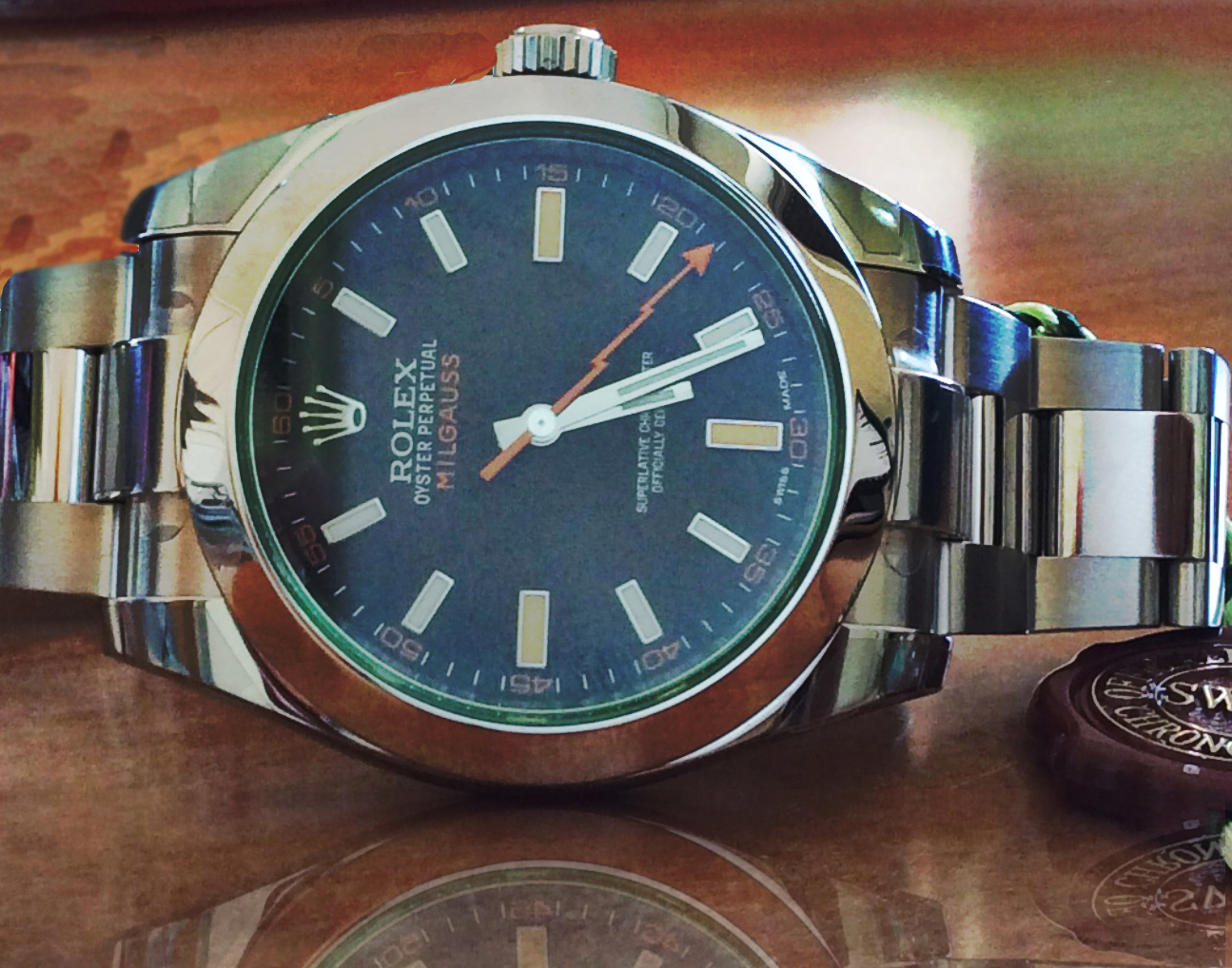
- The Rolex Milgauss Ref. 116400GV produced from 2016 until 2023
- Manufacturer: Rolex
- Type: Automatic
- Display: Analogue
- Introduced: 1956
- Discontinued: 2023

The Rolex Oyster Perpetual Milgauss is a wristwatch model introduced by Rolex in 1956 with model number 6541. The Milgauss was advertised as “designed to meet the demands of the scientific community working around electromagnetic fields”.

The Rolex Milgauss was discontinued in 2023.

== History ==
Rolex introduced the Milgauss Ref. 6541 in 1955-56, having been developed and tested by scientists at the European Organization for Nuclear Research (CERN) in Geneva. The name Milgauss is derived from the French mille, which means one-thousand, and gauss, the unit of a magnetic field.

Its resistance to magnetic interference stems from a shield inside the case made of ferromagnetic alloys, which protects the movement. This shield consists of two components, one screwed to the movement and the other to the case. In addition, its Caliber 3131 movement includes paramagnetic materials.

The original Milgauss was very similar to the appearance of the Rolex Submariner, with an oversized case and bezel, with the Twinlock crown, and a riveted Oyster bracelet. Although the Milgauss went through only two different models (6541, 1019) the Milgauss went through numerous configuration changes before being discontinued in 1986. In the 1960s, Rolex launched the Milgauss ref. 1019. However, this particular model looks so different from its predecessors that at first glance the Milgauss link (aside from the red MILGAUSS text) is not immediately clear.

The Milgauss remains a sought-after model amongst Rolex collectors due to its relatively low sales and popularity during the 1960s and 70s, it has become rare in today's vintage watch market. A vintage Milgauss signed by Tiffany & Co. sold in 2008 for over $32,000. A Rolex Milgauss was sold by Phillips Auctioneers in May 2023 for 2.24 million Swiss francs (US$2.5 million), setting a new record for the model.

== Versions ==
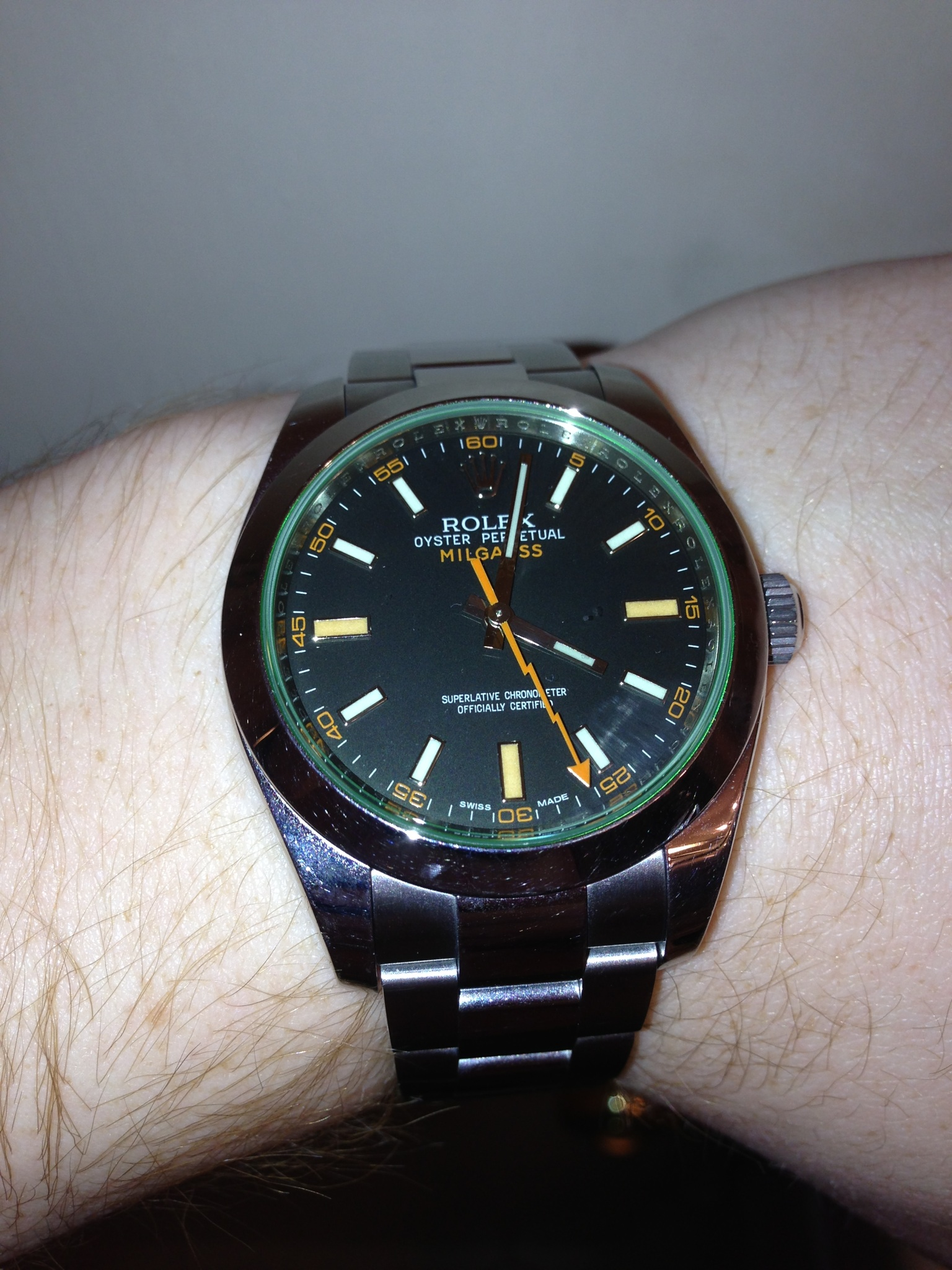
Rolex Milgauss GV (2012)

In 2007, Rolex brought back the Milgauss after nearly 20 years, as model number 116400. The model initially came in three versions: A black dial with white batons and orange squares on the minute track at the batons; a white dial with orange batons and orange minute track; a black dial with orange and white batons and a green sapphire crystal. The Milgauss was the only Rolex produced with a tinted crystal.

Because of its internal magnetic shield the Milgauss is thicker than the Submariner, but the same width. It weighs 157 grams. The Milgauss is available only in 904L polished stainless steel, which is extremely resistant to scratches and corrosion. Apart from its resistance to magnetic fields, the Milgauss' most unusual feature is its orange lightning-bolt second hand, a unique feature originally introduced with the 6541 Milgauss model.

== See also ==
- Rolex Daytona
- Rolex Day-Date
- Rolex Datejust
- Rolex GMT Master II
- Rolex Sea Dweller
- Rolex Submariner
- Rolex Yacht-Master
- Rolex Explorer II
