= Rolex Cosmograph Daytona =

Wristwatch model by Rolex

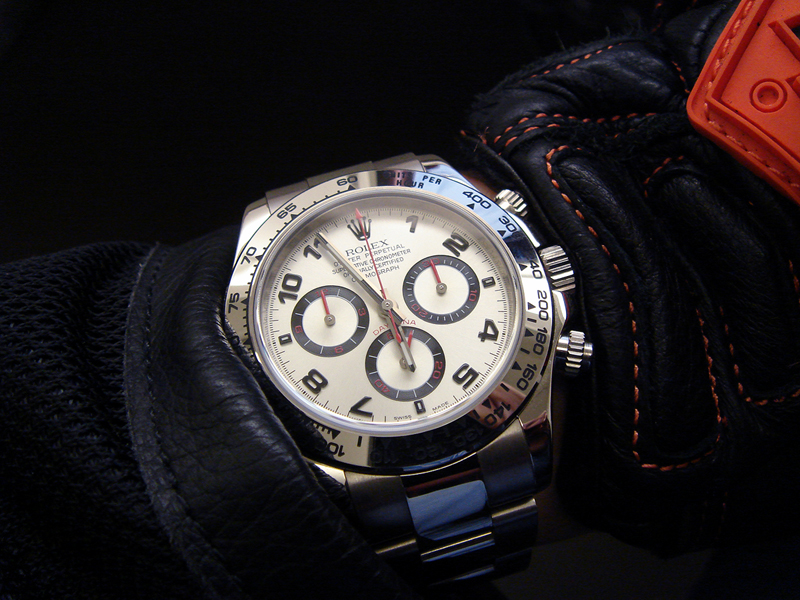
- 18k White Gold Daytona reference 116509 with Arabic Dial, discontinued in 2022
- Type: Chronograph wristwatch
- Inception: 1963
- Manufacturer: Rolex
- Current supplier: Rolex
- Website: www.rolex.com/watches/cosmograph-daytona/

The Rolex Cosmograph Daytona is a mechanical chronograph wristwatch designed to meet the needs of racing drivers by measuring elapsed time and calculating average speed. Its name refers to Daytona Beach, Florida, where racing flourished in the early 20th century. It has been manufactured by Rolex since 1963 in four distinct generations (or series); the second series was introduced in 1988, the third in 2000 and the fourth in 2023. While cosmetically similar, the second series introduced a self-winding movement (the first series is hand-wound), and the third series brought manufacture of the movement in-house to Rolex.

The first series included an "exotic" variant dial known as the Rolex "Paul Newman" Daytona, named after the famed actor, who received the watch as a gift from his wife, Joanne Woodward, and popularized it by wearing it consistently while pursuing his racing career. Years later, the actor's watch, which had been gifted by Newman to his daughter's boyfriend in 1984, was sold in 2017 at the Phillips New York Winning Icons auction for a record (for wristwatches) $17.8 million.

The latest Cosmograph Daytona is equipped with a tachymetric scale, a sweep seconds hand for reading to 1/8 of a second, and elapsed-time hours and minute displays. Its Rolex calibre 4131 has the particularity of using a vertical (rather than lateral) clutch to activate the chronograph, and was engineered to feature a reduced number of components for greater reliability. The minute and hour systems of this series is simplified with one single mechanism placed on a side of the movement (used to consist of two mechanisms placed on both sides of the movement). With a 40mm case, it is available in a variety of materials, including 18-karat gold as in the ref. 116598 timepiece owned by Elton John which sold at auction for $176,400.

The original, practical use of the Cosmograph Daytona as a racing driver's timer has evolved from a helpful aid to a social symbol. For example, this model was notably photographed on two of the world’s top tennis players following the 2025 Wimbledon final, Carlos Alcaraz and Jannic Sinner. The publicity surrounding these two Daytona-wearing tennis players marks the expansion of a watch with an originally niche purpose to a wrist piece for the wealthy without regard for its "original purpose."

== History ==
There have been three series of the Cosmograph Daytona. Prior to the release of the "Daytona", Rolex produced chronographs using movements sourced from outside manufacturers housed in conventional and, starting in the 1940s, Oyster cases. Rolex introduced a more modern chronograph in 1955, designated Reference 6234, and manufactured approximately 500 per year until 1961, the year it was discontinued. The dial of Reference 6234 was not marked "Cosmograph" or "Daytona". The Reference (model) number is marked on the side of the case at the 12 o'clock position, where it is hidden under the strap lugs. Each Rolex Daytona watch has a unique serial number, which is typically a 4-8 digit number engraved between the lugs on the 6 o'clock side of the case, behind the bracelet. The serial number can provide valuable information about the watch, including its production date. For instance, a Rolex watch with a serial number starting with 28000 was produced in 1926. Reference 6234 has three smaller sub-dials, to mark the passage of seconds up to 60 seconds (at the 9 o'clock position), minutes up to 30 minutes (at the 3 o'clock position), and hours up to 12 hours (at the 6 o'clock position); all of these match the color of the main dial. It also featured a tachymeter scale on the outer chapter ring, and a telemeter chronograph scale on the inner chapter ring. Reference 6234 was succeeded by Reference 6238, which dropped the telemeter scale and updated its appearance to include many features that would be adopted for its successor Reference 6239.

Rolex became the official timekeeper of the Daytona International Speedway in 1962, and to mark the occasion, Reference 6234 was replaced with Cosmograph Reference 6239, introduced in 1963 as the first chronograph from Rolex nicknamed "Daytona". However, the original Reference 6239 did not include "Daytona" on the dial (and was in fact nicknamed "Le Mans" for the famous 24 Hours of Le Mans race). In addition to the chronograph features, the wristwatch featured a bezel engraved with a tachymeter, as the watch was intended for racing drivers.

=== Original series ===
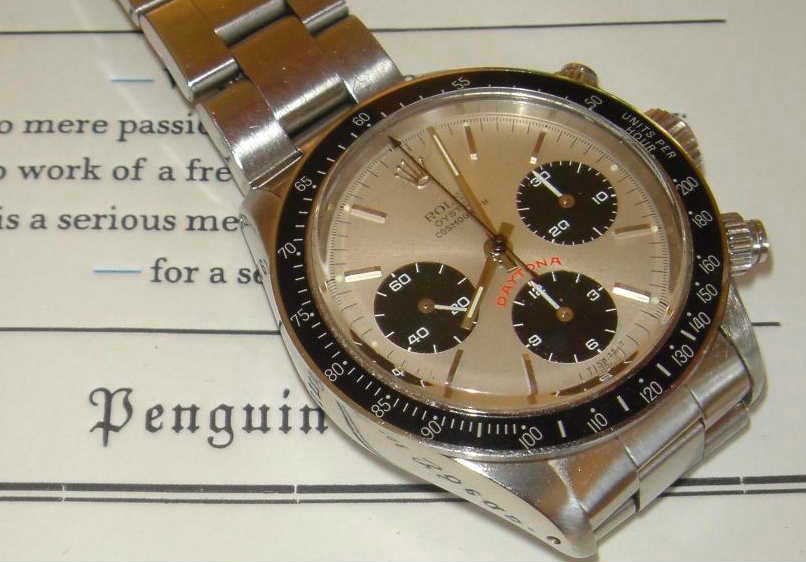
Model number 6263 stainless steel white dial Rolex Daytona

The original series, produced in small quantities from circa 1963 to the later 1980s, had a four-digit model or reference number, and had a manual wind movement. The movement is essential to distinguish the original series from the later two series, as the other two movements are self-wound. These first versions with four-digit model numbers are the rarest of the Daytonas. The first version, Reference 6239 featured plain pushers (timing buttons) and did not have the "Oyster" features to enhance water resistance, which include a screw-down winding crown and screw-down timing buttons. Reference 6240 introduced these "Oyster" features to the Cosmograph Daytona in 1965, but the "Oyster" Daytonas were manufactured in parallel with other models which retained the plain pushers until 1972. Various models of the original series could also be distinguished by different bezel materials.

The movement used in the original series was a manual wind movement manufactured by Valjoux, which was designated Calibre 72. It was reworked by Rolex and redesignated as Calibre 722. References 6263 and 6265 (produced from 1970) were Oyster versions. The movement used remained based on the manual-wind Valjoux Calibre 72, but with some refinements, and was called the Rolex Calibre 727. These Daytonas are very rare and very collectible. The movement has proven to be exceptionally reliable and accurate. In fact, the Cal. 727 was certified as a chronometer in some cases.

Cosmetically, original series Daytonas carried sub-dials in a single color that contrasted with the color of the main dial (i.e., both variants: a black dial with white sub-dials, and a white dial with black sub-dials), in contrast with Reference 6238, which retained a monotone scheme and a tachymeter within the crystal. However, rare "albino" variants of the Daytona are known to exist where sub-dial colors match the main dial like Reference 6238. The first known "Albino Daytona" was owned by Eric Clapton. The word "Daytona" was added below the 12 o'clock "Rolex Cosmograph" signature in 1964, then moved to a position above the 6 o'clock (hours) sub-dial by 1967. The first of the "exotic" dials (later named "Paul Newman" dials) were introduced in 1965.

Cosmograph Daytona, Original series
Years	Reference	Calibre	VPH	Bezel	Oyster	Notes/Features
1963–69	6239	722, 722-1	18,000	Engraved (stainless steel)	No No	Earliest model carries extra tachymeter engraving at 275 units/hr.
1965–69	6240	722, 722-1	18,000	Black (acrylic inlay)	Yes Yes	First appearance of optional metallic dial finish.
1965–69	6241	722, 722-1	18,000	Black (acrylic inlay)	No No	All variants include "Daytona" printed on dial.
1970	6262	727	21,600	Engraved (stainless steel)	No No	Produced for one year only.
1971–88	6263	727	21,600	Black (acrylic inlay)	Yes Yes	
1970–72	6264	727	21,600	Black (acrylic inlay)	No No	
1971–88	6265	727	21,600	Engraved (stainless steel)	Yes Yes	

The Rolex Daytona was inspired by racecar drivers and enthusiasts, most notably, iconic actor Paul Newman, who reportedly wore his Daytona every day after he was gifted one by his wife. Newman typically wore it on a leather military strap, and was photographed wearing it in this fashion for the 1972 book Paul Newman - Les images d'une vie. The caseback bore a custom engraving: "DRIVE CAREFULLY ME". By 2005, Newman had replaced it with a Reference 6263 Daytona with a conventional dial, also a gift, bearing the inscription "DRIVE SLOWLY, JOANNE". The second Daytona was reportedly purchased in 1984, which prompted Newman to gift the first Daytona to his daughter's boyfriend, James Cox, that year.

=== Second series ===
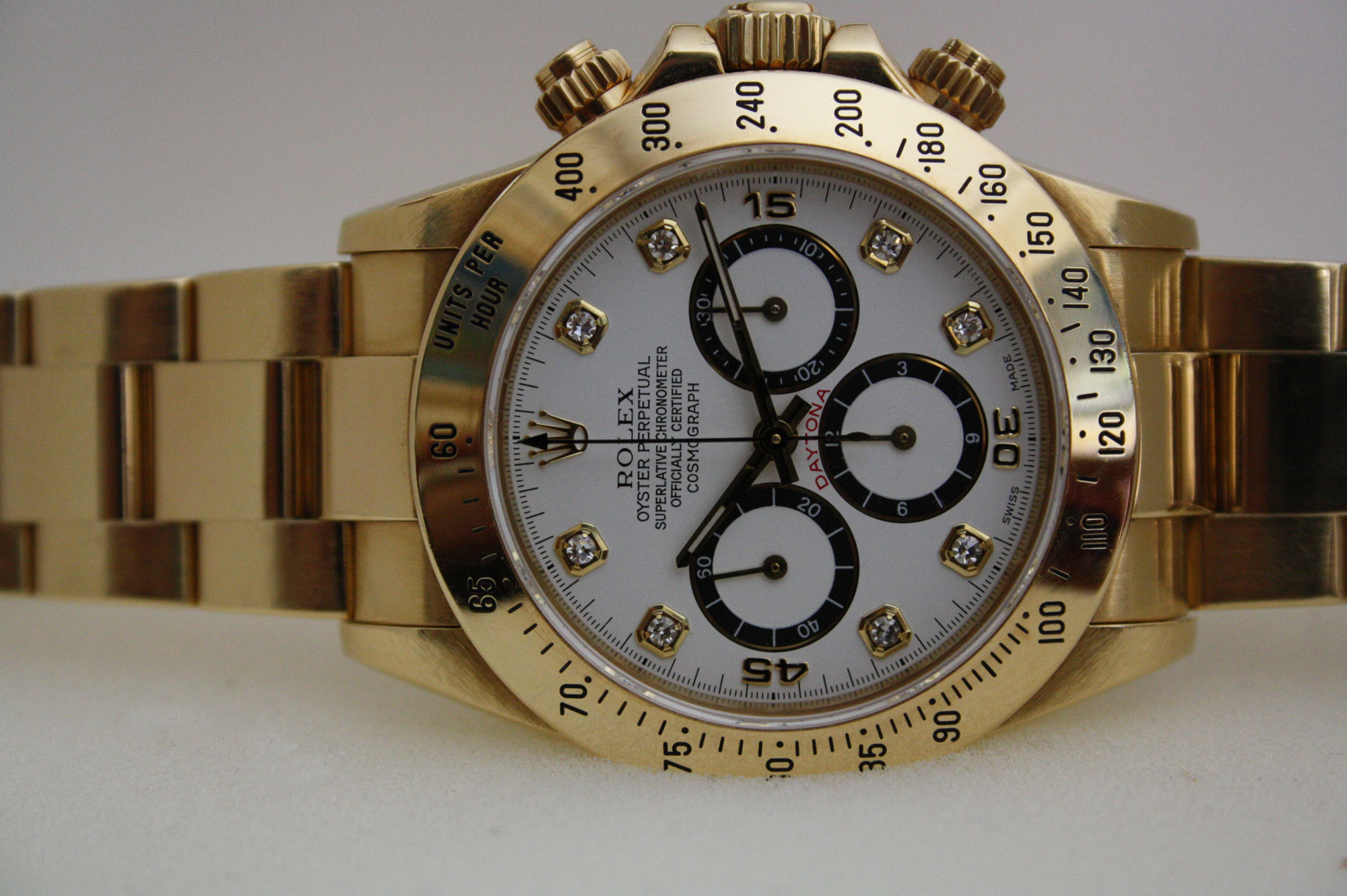
Reference 16528 in gold with white dial and diamond chapters

This original series was in very short supply by the early 1990s, which led to a second series to meet demand, introduced in 1988 with Reference 16520. The second series uses a modified automatic winding movement, originally manufactured by Zenith for their "El Primero" watch, designated by Zenith as Calibre 3019PHC. The movement was originally designed in 1969 after development commenced in 1962 and remains the highest VPH (vibrations per hour) mass-produced chronograph movement on the market at 36,000 VPH. After Zenith was sold to the American company of the same name in 1971, the company discontinued production of mechanical movements in 1975. However, Charles Vermot, a senior engineer for Martel Watch Company (where the El Primero was made, and which had been acquired in 1959 by Zenith) had, over a period of months, secretly disassembled the tooling for the El Primero and stored it in the factory attic after the closure had been announced in 1975.

After Zenith Radio resold Zenith in 1978, Ebel decided to purchase some unassembled Calibre 3019PHC movements in 1981, which Zenith assembled out of leftover spare parts. Rolex expressed interest in using the 3019PHC to power a new series of Daytonas, but would not award the ten-year contract to Zenith until they could resume production of new movements. Production resumed in 1986 after Vermot showed company leaders where he had saved the tooling and production notes. Rolex modified the movement by reducing the beats to 28,800 VPH to increase the power reserve, and made a few other changes, retaining only 50% of the original parts. The modified movement was designated Calibre 4030 by Rolex.

The second series Daytonas used a sapphire crystal (in lieu of the acrylic crystal of the original series); the case diameter grew from 37 mm (1.5 in) on the original to 40 mm (1.6 in) for the second series; the dials were now glossy; and the sub-dials were now largely the same color as the dial, with an outer track in a contrasting color. These later series Daytonas, pre-dating in-house movements, were accurate and reliable; they were produced in limited quantities from 1988 to 2000.

The second series uses a five-digit Reference number. The "Chairman Daytona" was created in 1991 as a variant of Reference 16528; it has a galvanised blue dial and the tachymeter markings go to 400 units/hr. Two second series Daytonas were sold with leather straps: Reference 16518 (yellow gold) and 16519 (white gold).

=== Third series ===
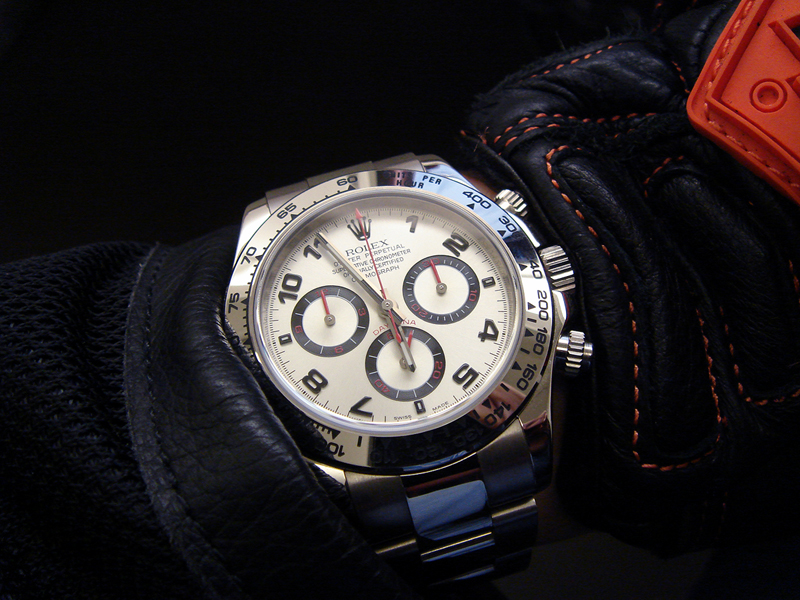
Model number 116509 white gold silver dial Rolex Daytona

The third series, introduced in 2000, has a movement made by Rolex (designated Calibre 4130) and a six-digit model number, Reference 116520. Externally, the third series may be distinguished by close examination of the dial; the two sub-dials at the 3 and 9 o'clock positions are now slightly above an imaginary line drawn between the 3 and 9 o'clock chapters, and the running seconds sub-dial has been relocated from the 9 o'clock position to the 6 o'clock position.

The six-digit Daytonas are certified, self-winding chronometers with chronograph functions. Rolex has sponsored the 24 Hours of Daytona sports car race, which became known as Rolex 24 at Daytona, from 1991, and named its chronograph watch after the race. The members of the winning team in each division are each presented with a Rolex Daytona watch during the victory celebration. In 2023, Rolex announced a special edition of the Daytona with a 24-hour sub-dial, to reflect the length of this race, and a separate calibre, the 4132.

=== Fourth series ===
Rolex Cosmograph Daytona Wristwatch Ref: 126500LN nicknamed "Panda" by watch enthusiasts

The fourth series replaces the Calibre 4130 with the newly developed Calibre 4131. This update integrates Rolex's patented Chronergy escapement, which utilises nickel-phosphorus components to increase magnetic resistance and improve energy efficiency. Despite these efficiency upgrades, it maintains a 72-hour power reserve. Cosmetically, the movement is now finished with Rolex Côtes de Genève.

While maintaining a 40mm diameter, the case thickness was reduced compared to the previous model. The Oyster case also features redesigned, symmetrical lugs to balance the watch on the wrist, alongside a flatter caseback profile.

The most distinct visual update to the exterior is the addition of a thin metal ring framing the outer edge of the Cerachrom ceramic bezel. This metal rim matches the case material and provides structural protection to the edge of the ceramic insert.

The dial architecture was reworked to create more negative space. The concentric rings surrounding the three subdials were made noticeably thinner, and the subdials themselves were shifted slightly further inward toward the centre pinion. Additionally, the applied 18k white gold hour markers were made longer and more slender

Stainless steel variants of the Daytona remain very difficult to acquire, and a waiting list exists for interested purchasers of new watches, as production is limited to a few thousand per year.

== Daytona "Paul Newman" dial ==
One of the rarest Daytonas are those with what has been called the "exotic" or "Paul Newman" dial. It is said that Newman wore one of these watches, given to him by his wife Joanne Woodward when he took up automobile racing, from 1972. While other sources agree it was a gift from Woodward, they assert the watch was presented to Newman earlier, during the filming of Winning in 1968 or 1969. It is estimated that only one in twenty Daytonas were equipped with the "exotic" dial because they were slow to sell, and that only 2,000 to 3,000 such "exotic" dial variants were ever manufactured.

Comparison of original series Daytona dials
(black on white combination)

Conventional Daytona dial

"Exotic" or "Paul Newman" dial

Its distinguishing features are subtle. First, a Paul Newman dial must be in an original series watch (with a four-digit Reference number), installed by Rolex Geneva as original. All of the original series had acrylic domed crystals. In addition, the sub-dials of a "Paul Newman" Daytona have block markers instead of plain lines, have crosshairs across each sub-dial meeting at the centre, and the seconds sub-dial (placed at 9:00) is marked at the 15, 30, 45 and 60 positions, whereas a normal Daytona seconds sub-dial is marked at 20, 40 and 60. The dial may or may not have the word "Daytona" written on the dial above the hour sub-dial located at 6:00. The dial came in four color and layout combinations, and was installed as an option by Rolex on the Daytona line of watches in the original series. The watch went out of production in the early 1970s, and Rolex does not supply any replacement version of it. The outer track of the main dial is finished in a contrasting color that matches the color of the sub-dials. The typeface used on the sub-dials is different as well. Since the dials were made by Singer for Rolex, there are contemporary watches from other manufacturers which feature the same "exotic" dial.

The earliest "Paul Newman" Daytonas are Reference 6239 model watches, which use a black or white dial, and are known as three-color watches, as they have the name "Daytona" and hashmarks on the outer track painted in red. They were succeeded by the Reference 6241 watches, which replaced the engraved stainless steel bezel with a black acrylic bezel. References 6262 (steel bezel) and 6264 (black bezel) were the last of the three-color watches as Rolex began to transition to Calibre 727, and the final References 6265 (steel bezel) and 6263 (black bezel) used a two-color dial (where the outer track hashes no longer are painted in red) with an "Oyster" case, featuring a screw-down crown and pushers. Examples of the Reference 6240 Paul Newman have been postulated to exist, which would be either two- or three-color dials. A similar dial was used in the prototype Rolex Yachtmaster, of which three examples are known to exist.

"One of the days at the treehouse, Paul [Newman] asked me what time it was, to set his watch. I replied, 'I don’t know—I don’t have a watch.' He was clearly surprised. So he said, 'Here, here’s a watch. If you wind it, it tells pretty good time.' " Newman handed James [Cox] his Rolex Cosmograph Daytona. "At that time, I knew Rolex was an amazing brand, but I had no idea how significant the watch was," James says.

— 2017 Wall Street Journal article.

In 1984, Paul Newman gave his first Rolex Daytona to James Cox, then the boyfriend of his daughter, Nell Newman. Cox, who put the watch up for auction in 2017, said that Newman gave him the watch in 1984 as a gift after offering to repair the treehouse at the Newman home in Westport, Connecticut. Woodward bought Newman a new watch in 1984, and he gave the Rolex Daytona to Cox.

The original Daytona watches were not in demand when produced, and were relatively inexpensive ($210 + tax when introduced), but later became highly collectible and fetched high prices at auction. In 1988, a stainless "Paul Newman" Daytona (Ref. 6241) was listed in an auction catalog with an estimated closing price of $3,000 to $3,500. In 2013, during a special Rolex Daytona-themed auction held in Geneva on 10 November, Christie's sold a rare Rolex Daytona Ref. 6263 in steel, manufactured in 1969, for SFr 989000 (well over one million US dollars).

=== October 2017 auction ===
On 26 October 2017, a Rolex Daytona (Ref. 6239) watch formerly owned by Paul Newman was sold for US$17.75 million in New York City, making it the second most expensive wristwatch and the third most expensive watch ever sold at auction (as of July 2020).

The final price of $17,752,500 for the "Paul Newman" Daytona Ref. 6239 was the sum of the winning auction bid ($15.5 million) and a buyer's premium of 12.5%. The model was sold by Phillips in association with Bacs & Russo in New York City, as part of the "WINNING ICONS: Milestone Watches of the 20th Century" auction. The watch, called the "Holy Grail" or "Amber Room" of watches and long presumed lost, had been "found" earlier in 2017. Aurel Bacs, the auctioneer, remarked "The first question you ask when you get interested in vintage watches is, 'Where is Paul Newman's Paul Newman [Daytona]?' Everyone knows that by the mid-'80s Newman is no longer wearing it, and nobody knows where it is. There is hardly a dinner with collectors where the conversation does not turn to this watch. Where is it, and how much will it make if it ever comes to market?" Bacs himself was initially skeptical, but was humbled "to discover that a collector had told the owners that there was only one person, and one auction house that could do the job properly" of auctioning the rare watch, leading James Cox to hire Bacs.

Bidding opened at $1 million, but as the commission bid was being announced, it was interrupted by a $10 M bid, which was raised in increments of $500,000 until it was finally sold at the winning $15.5 M bid. The price of US$17.75 M makes it the most expensive wristwatch ever sold. In 1984, when Newman gave the watch to James Cox, the watch was selling for about $200. Cox announced his plans to donate a significant portion of the proceeds to the Nell Newman Foundation and Newman's Own Foundation.

== See also ==
- Chronograph
- Omega Speedmaster
- Breitling Navitimer
- TAG Heuer Monaco
- Rolex Day-Date
- Rolex Datejust
- Rolex GMT Master II
- Rolex Milgauss
- Rolex Sea Dweller
- Rolex Submariner
- Rolex Yacht-Master
- Rolex Explorer II
