= Jean Arcelin =

French and Swiss painter (born 1962)

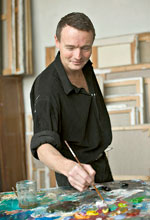
- Born: 22 June 1962 (age 64); Paris, France
- Education: Sorbonne, Paris
- Known for: painting
- Movement: Realism
- Website: www.jean-arcelin.fr

Jean Arcelin (born 22 June 1962) is a French and Swiss painter.

== Biography ==
Arcelin studied at Charpentier, an accredited art history school affiliated with the Sorbonne, where he developed an interest in seventeenth- and eighteenth-century painting. His paintings blend false realism and figurative art, and aspects of Baroque style.

His pictorial compositions are simply the results of his imagination without any cinematographic aids, using principally the oil canvas technique called "alla prima", keen to the original impressionist painters, which cancels the initial undercoated and glazed steps. Landscapes edge with the urban sea, and combine with portraitist gesture. He takes corners of Paris, cafe chairs piled up in the angle of view of a monument, or the dressing room of a theatre, and portrays them empty of all human presence. He participated in the Ebel sponsored Art and Culture in Basel and in Villa Schwob, Switzerland from 1990 to 1995 and exhibited in 1989, 1990 and 1999 at the Institut de France.

== Recent exhibitions ==
=== Selected solo exhibitions ===
- Since 2006: Galerie 26 Place des Vosges, Paris.
- 2013: Callanwolde Fine Arts Center, Atlanta, GA.
- Since 2012: Besharat Gallery, Barbizon.
- Since 2010: Besharat Gallery, Atlanta, GA.
- 2010, 2011: Ariel Sibony Gallery, Place des Vosges, Paris.
- 2010, 2011: Sibman Gallery, Place des Vosges, Paris.
- 2010, 2015: Galerie Fert, Yvoire, France.

=== Selected group exhibitions ===
- 2011, 2012, 2013: Art Palm Beach, West Palm Beach, FL.
- 2010, 2011, 2012: The Affordable Art Fair (AAF), New York City.
- 2011: Scope Basel, Switzerland.
- 2011: ArtMRKT, San Francisco, CA.
- 2011: Scope, New York City.
- 2011: Lille Art Fair.
- 2011: MIA Art Fair, Miami, FL.
- 2010: The Red Dot, Miami, FL.
- 2010: Art London, Chelsea.

== Gallery ==
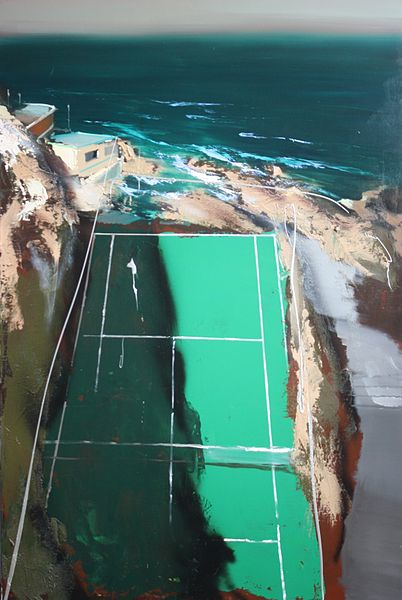
Pacific court

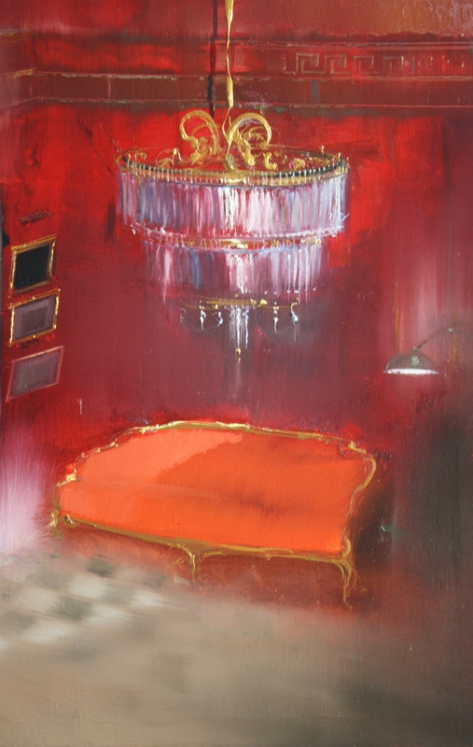
Boudoir

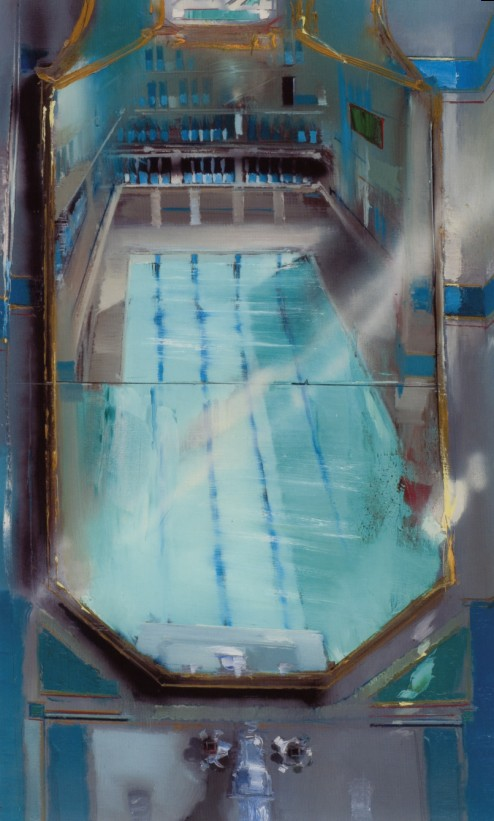
Mirror and pool

== Notes and references ==
.

== Bibliography ==
- Jean Arcelin, peintre de l’instant et de l’instinct, texts by Séverine Plat-Monin, 156 pages. Editions des falaises, 2019. ISBN 978-2-84811-420-0
- Jean Arcelin, Besharat Gallery editions, 2013. (63 pages)
- Catalogue for the exhibition Jean-Arcelin, impressions of Italy, preface by Lydia Harambourg. Galerie 26’s edition, 2009. ISBN 978-2-9132-9019-8
- Monograph Mirage and conjuring. 96 pages, 57 colour reproductions. Galerie 26’s edition, 2008. ISBN 2-913290-17-5
- Catalogue for the exhibition Jean Arcelin, recent paintings, preface by Lydia Harambourg. Galerie 26’s edition, 2007. ISBN 978-2-9132-9016-7
- Jean Arcelin. Basel, Hardhof. Espace Art and Culture Ebel, 1990. Texts by Gérard Xuriguera. Editions Glasnost, Grandson, 1990. ISBN 978-2-8837-2000-8
