= Rolex Yacht-Master =

Luxury sports watch by Rolex

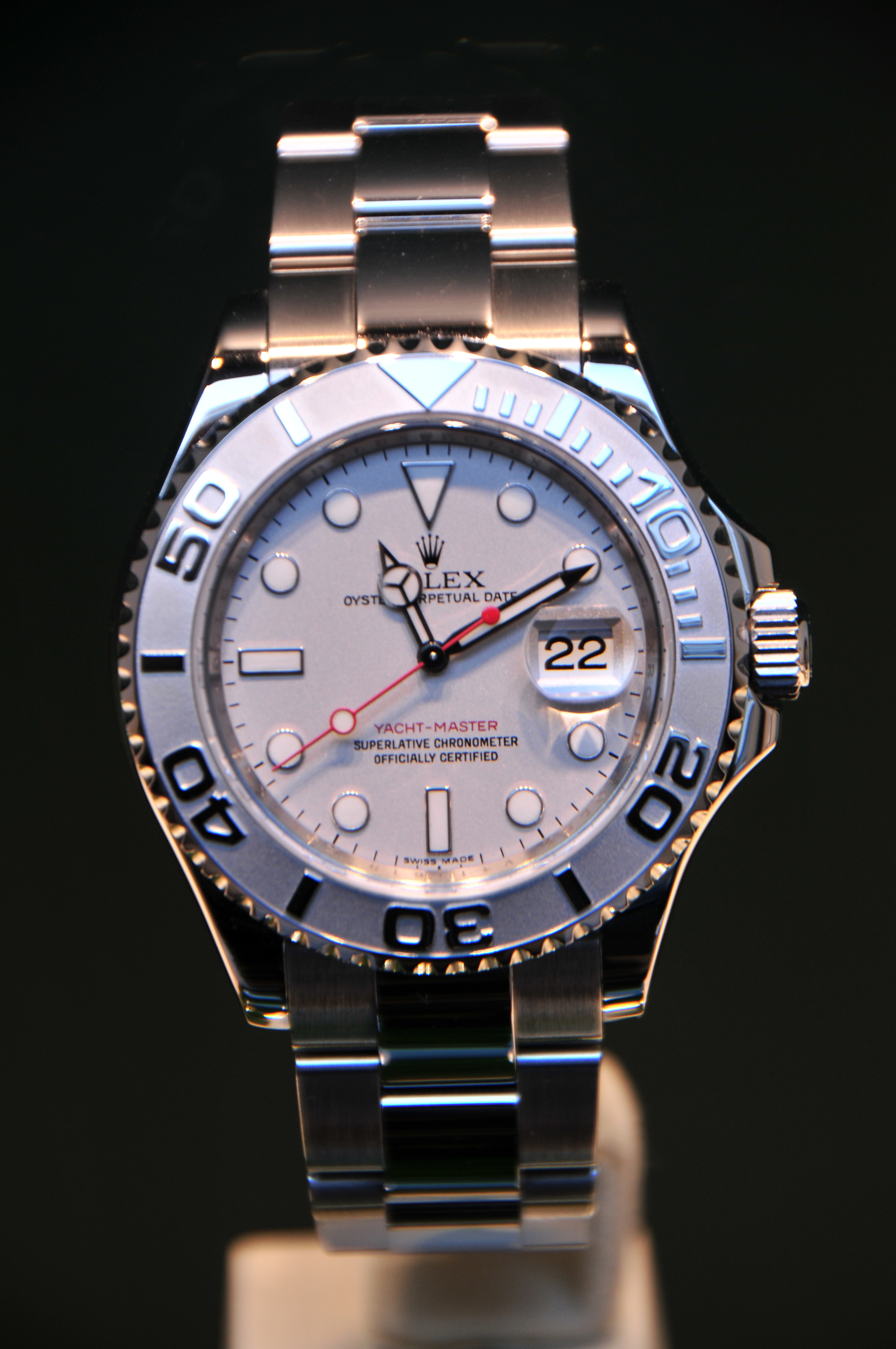
- Rolex Yacht-Master
- Manufacturer: Rolex
- Type: Automatic
- Display: Analog
- Introduced: 1992

The Rolex Yacht-Master is a line of luxury sports watch manufactured by Rolex.

== History ==
The Rolex Yacht-Master was first introduced in 1992 as Reference 16628 in 18-karat yellow gold. Inspired by the design of the Submariner, the Yacht-Master was exclusively offered in precious metals, and featured a bi-directional bezel, with a different, thinner case shape.

In 1994, Rolex released a lady's model (69628) and a mid-size model (68628) at 35mm, marking the first time in Rolex history that a professional series watch was available in smaller than the standard size case. In 1996, Rolex introduced two-tone (stainless steel and 18-carat yellow gold) to the lady's and mid-size line.

In 1997, Rolex released a Yacht-Master made of stainless steel and platinum, wherein the bezel and dial are made from 950 platinum while the case, bracelet and crown, are in stainless steel.

However, by 1999 Rolex had discontinued their two-tone stainless steel and 18K gold reference 68623 and replaced it in 2000 with a new two-tone model: Reference 168623. The difference between the two models is the new movement found in reference 168623, and the new solid 18K gold center links found on the new, heavier bracelet (the reference 68623 bracelet having hollow center links.

=== Yacht-Master II ===
In 2007, the brand released the Rolex Yacht-Master II regatta chronograph watch, the world's first watch equipped with a programmable countdown from 1 to 10 minutes using a mechanical memory.

In 2015, Rolex launched the 18K Everose gold Yacht-Master, the first Rolex watch to come on a rubberized bracelet, known now as the Oysterflex. The Everose Yacht-Master is available in two sizes - 37mm (268655) and 40mm (126655).

In 2019, Rolex introduced the Rolex Yacht-Master 42, the first Yacht-Master with 42mm case size to feature a date complication. The case, bezel, and Oysterlock clasp are made of 18K white gold, while the bezel contains a matte black and polished Cerachrom material insert.

The Rolex Yacht-Master is offered in 37mm, 40mm and 42mm case sizes. All Rolex Yacht-master models have a water resistance rating of 100 metres [330 ft]. and a triple-locking winding crown system taken from Rolex’s family of saturation diving watches.

=== RLX titanium Yacht-Master ===
In 2023, Rolex released an all-titanium variant of the Yacht-Master made using grade 5 titanium. A prototype of the watch had previously been worn by British competitive sailor Ben Ainslie, in 2020.

== Related pages ==
- Rolex Daytona
- Rolex Day-Date
- Rolex Datejust
- Rolex GMT Master II
- Rolex Milgauss
- Rolex Sea Dweller
- Rolex Submariner
- Rolex Yacht-Master II
- Rolex Explorer II
