= Art Palm Beach =

- Status: Active
- Genre: Contemporary Art
- Frequency: Annually
- Venue: Palm Beach County Convention Center
- Locations: West Palm Beach, Florida, U.S.
- Country: United States
- Inaugurated: 1997; 29 years ago
- Founder: David Lester; Lee Ann Lester
- Attendance: 30,000
- Organizer: Palm Beach Show Group
- Website: artpalmbeachshow.com

Art Palm Beach is an international modern and contemporary art fair in The Palm Beaches. The fair, founded in 1997, is held in West Palm Beach and exhibits the works of international artists, ranging from "the most promising emerging talent" to masters. Art work exhibited includes photography, painting, design, fine art glass, sculpture, and video. Art Palm Beach is the largest fair of its kind in the Palm Beaches in terms of attendance, square footage, and total sales conducted by its exhibitors. Founded in 1997, Art Palm Beach is an international modern and contemporary art fair in The Palm Beaches. The fair features a diverse range of artistic disciplines, including photography, painting, design, fine art glass, sculpture and video, Art Palm Beach is the largest fair of its kind in the Palm Beaches in attendance, square footage and total sales generated by its exhibitors. The fair is held at the Palm Beach County Convention Center in West Palm Beach.

== History ==
Art Palm Beach was established in South Florida in 1997. It is the longest running mid-winter fair dedicated to contemporary, emerging and modern masterworks of 20th and 21st century art.

Acquired by the Palm Beach Show Group in 2022, Art Palm Beach was previously organized by IFAE/Next Level fair founders David and Lee Ann Lester, original founders of Art Miami, Art Asia Hong Kong, American International Fine Art Fair and Art Boca Raton.

Video, performance art, art installations and new technologies have become features of the fair, offering collectors exposure to today’s emerging art trends.

== Organizer: Palm Beach Show Group ==
Palm Beach Show Group, owner of the LA Art Show, acquired Art Palm Beach in 2022. Art Palm Beach resumes in January 2023 under the new leadership of Kassandra Voyagis, who serves as manager and director for LA Art Show.

== Exhibitors ==
- Jean Arcelin
- Humberto Calzada
- Li Chen
- David Datuna
- Josignacio
- István Sándorfi
- Lino Tagliapietra
- Alexi Torres
- The Holoverse
- Marcel Katz
- The Directed Art Modern

== See also ==
- Art Basel
- Frieze Art Fair
- Art exhibition
- Arts festival
- Palm Beach
