= Ebel =

Swiss watchmaker

- Logo
- Industry: Watchmaking
- Founded: 1911
- Founders: Eugène Blum and Alice Lévy
- Headquarters: La Chaux-de-Fonds, canton of Neuchâtel, Switzerland
- Products: Watches
- Website: www.ebel.com

Ebel is a Swiss luxury watch company that was founded in 1911 at La Chaux-de-Fonds in the canton of Neuchâtel, Switzerland.

== History ==
Eugène Blum and his wife Alice (née Lévy), founded Ebel in 1911. The brand name originates from the first letters of their names: Eugène Blum et Lévy. According to the company catalogue of 2008, Eugène was responsible for the technical elements, while Alice was responsible for aesthetics and design. Little is known about her public identity as an artist and entrepreneur, nor about her private life in the family and in the Jewish community. The prize certificate for a patented ring watch in 1914 demonstrates the societal restrictions and lack of recognition for women at the time, being issued to “Messieurs Blum & Cie, Fabrique Ebel La Chaux-de-Fonds” (Gentlemen Blum & Co.).

In 1929, their son Charles took over the management of the company. He built the sales network of the business by further expanding it into many foreign countries, including the United States. Under the direction of Blum's grandson Pierre-Alain, the company took a significant upturn since the beginning of the 1970s and produced wristwatches for Cartier. In the late 1980s to 1990s, EBEL reached its peak popularity with iconic models like the 1911 and Sport Classic. In year 1994, Pierre-Alain Blum left the business and sold the family company to private equity group Investcorp. Then the company was again sold to LVMH in year 1999. The company was part of LVMH until 2003 when LVMH sold Ebel to Movado for $62.2 million.

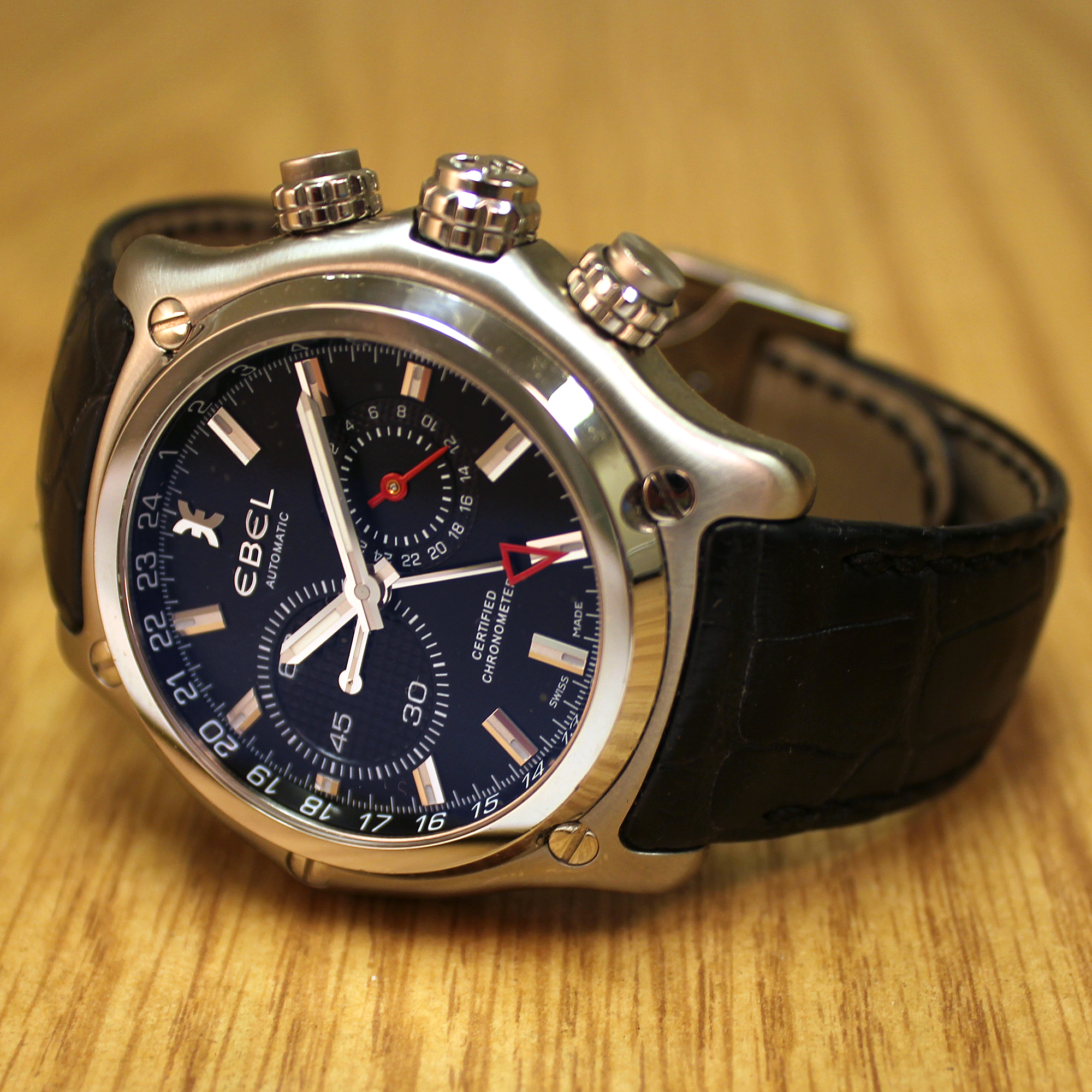
Ebel 1911 BTR GMT mens watch ref. E9240L70

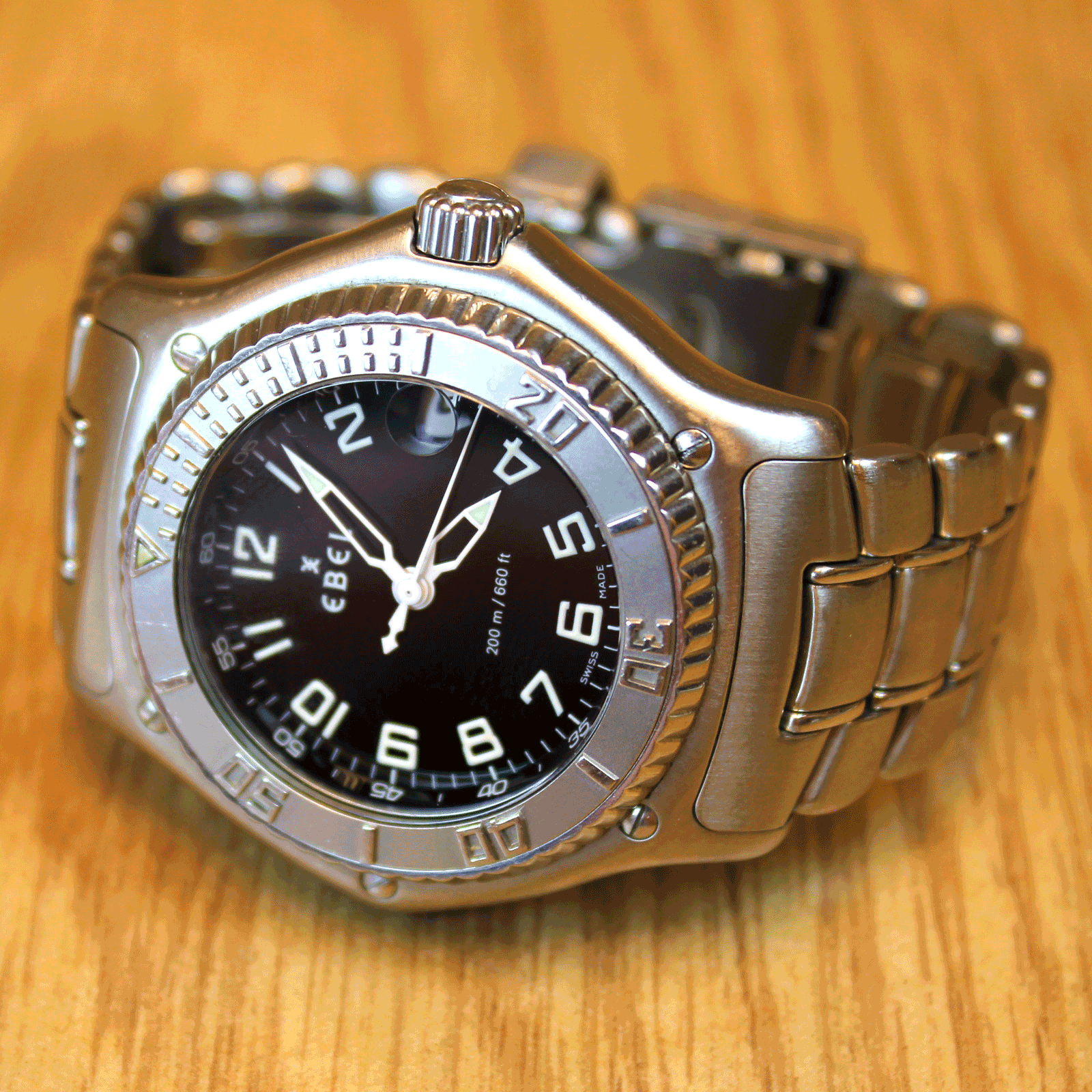
Ebel Discovery watch reference 9187341 made in Switzerland

=== "Saving" Zenith in the Quartz Crisis ===
Back in 1978, Swiss watch brand Zenith ceased mechanical watch production due to the Quartz Crisis and a significant decline in the mechanic watch sales. In 1981, Ebel decided to purchase leftover parts, unassembled Calibre 3019PHC movements for their chronograph Caliber 134, subsequently released in 1982. The El Primero chronograph exploded in popularity and became the must have watch of the 80’s. This helped to revive the Zenith chronograph movement which subsequently got adopted by Rolex in their first automatic chronograph watch - Daytona.

=== The "Architects of Time" ===
Ebel has long sponsored the work of famous architects such as Le Corbusier (who was born in La Chaux-de-Fonds), Andree Putman, or — in the early 1990s — contemporary Swiss painters, such as Jean Arcelin. In 1986, the Villa Turque, an early masterpiece of Le Corbusier, was acquired by the group for its 75th anniversary.

In the late 1980s, Ebel reached its peak of popularity with cultural icon like Don Johnson wearing an Ebel 1911 Chronograph in American drama series Miami Vice.

In 2019, a gold-and-diamond wristwatch fabricated in 1974 and gifted from the singer Elvis Presley was being auctioned. It is crafted in 18 kt gold and features 26 round white diamonds framing the clock face. A personal inscription reads, "From Elvis to J.D. Sumner 1974".
