= Humberto Calzada =

Cuban-American painter (1944–2025)

- Born: May 25, 1944; Havana, Cuba
- Died: August 17, 2025 (aged 81); Miami, Florida, U.S.
- Education: University of Miami
- Known for: Painting
- Notable work: in museums: Meadows Museum and Sculpture. Dallas, Texas, USA; Museo Nacional de Bellas Artes, Santiago, Chile; Sait Louis Art Museum. Saint Louis, Missouri, USA
- Movement: Contemporary
- Awards: Cintas Foundation Fellowship 1979, 1981. Painting Fellowship Division of Cultural Affairs, State of Florida

Humberto Calzada (May 25, 1944 – August 17, 2025) was a Cuban-American artist who lived in Miami, Florida, from 1960 until his death.

== Life and career ==
Calzada was born in Havana on May 25, 1944. His family left Cuba shortly after the communist takeover of Fidel Castro, on October 11, 1960. He attended and graduated from Coral Gables Senior High School. He would later attend the University of Miami where he graduated as an Industrial Engineer in 1966, and again the University of Miami where he also earned an MBA in Finance in 1968.

In 1976, Calzada decided to pursue painting as a full-time career. The subject of most of his art is the architecture of Cuba particularly Havana's colonial and neo-classical architecture.

Calzada's work is in numerous museums as well as in private, corporate, and public collections. In 2006, the Lowe Art Museum at the University of Miami presented a thirty-year Retrospective of his work titled "Humberto Calzada: In Dreams Awake." Calzada resided in Miami.

Calzada died on August 17, 2025, in Miami, at the age of 81.

== Periods ==
Calzada's art can, generally, be divided into phases or categories, but not into periods. They are phases in the sense that, during a specific time he painted primarily that category of painting, though not to the exclusion of all else. But they are "categories" in the sense that, throughout his career, he's produced works that have characteristics of any of the different classifications or will revisit any past phase. The general major classifications are:

1. The Anecdotal Period paintings. Paintings of a more personal nature painted in a detailed but casual style, based on memories of his home, places he knew and visited in Cuba, and other specific recollections.
2. The Surreal Theatrical Scenarios paintings. Extracting elements of Cuban architecture and placing them out of context in an unlikely setting.
3. Meta-Art paintings. An extension of the theatrical scenarios but incorporating his past works in the walls as one more element.
4. The Gardens paintings. Ruins, incomplete buildings, but still recognizable as Cuban architecture of the neo-classical period.
5. Still Life paintings. Brief period in which architectural elements were arranged as classical still life painting.
6. "Years of" Paintings. These are the flooded spaces, which consist mostly of houses in which the ocean waters have entered. It was one of his favorite iconographies because water has a dual meaning: it can mean total destruction, but it can also mean rebirth.
7. Tributes to other painters. Paintings which can either be Calzada in subject but another painter in technique or style or a Calzada painting in which the work of another painter is either hung or displayed in the space portrayed.
8. The Night paintings. Paintings of architectural and/or landscape themes at night.
9. La Hora Azul paintings. Paintings of architectural and/or landscape themes during the dusk hours.
10. The swimming pool paintings or Cuba circa 2025 painting. An optimistic assumption that in the not-too-distant futures, Cuba will not only have houses in good repair, but also houses with swimming pools.
11. The Reconstructing Havana paintings. A much-enlarged photograph of current private and public buildings in Havana is partially "reconstructed" by painting in what once was and what, someday, could be again.

== Exhibitions ==
=== Solo ===
Solo exhibits of Calzada's artwork between 1975 and 2006.

Humberto Calzada's work

Humberto Calzada at work.

==== 1990–2006 ====
- Lowe Art Museum, University of Miami, A Thirty-Year. Retrospective", Miami, Florida USA
- University of Miami, Bacardi Gallery, "Cuba: La Hora Azul", Miami, Florida USA
- Galeria Arteconsult, "Cuba y la Noche II", Panama City, Panama
- Jose Alonso Fine Arts, "Cuba y la Noche," Miami, Florida USA
- Jose Alonso Fine Arts, "Humberto Calzada: New Collection of Graphic Work," Miami, Florida., USA
- Corbino Galleries, "Sanctuaries for the Spirit" Longboat Key, Florida, USA
- Galeria Arteconsult, Panama City, Panama
- Museo Ixchel, Ciudad Guatemala, Guatemala
- Galería Amalia Mahoney, Chicago, Illinois, USA
- Galería Acquavella, Caracas, Venezuela
- Freites-Revilla Gallery, Boca Raton, Florida, USA
- Galería Arteconsult, Panama City, Panama
- Galería Forum de Las Artes, San Juan, P.R.
- Corbino Galleries, Sarasota, Florida, USA
- The America's Collection, Coral Gables, Florida, USA
- Freites-Revilla Gallery, Boca Raton, Florida, USA
- Corbino Galleries, Sarasota, Florida, USA
- The America's Collection, Coral Gables, Florida, USA
- Museo de Arte Contemporáneo. Panama City, Panama
- Kennesaw State College Art Gallery, Marietta, Georgia, USA
- Galería 1.2.3, San Salvador, El Salvador
- Bass Museum of Art, "Fifteen Years Retrospective," Miami Beach, Florida USA
- Corbino Galleries, Sarasota, Florida., USA
- Fred Snitzer Gallery, Coral Gables, Florida., USA
- Gloria Luria Gallery, Bay Harbor Islands, Florida USA
- Galería Arteconsult, Panama City, Panama

==== 1975–1990 ====
- Galería 1.2.3., San Salvador, El Salvador
- Corbino Galleries, Sarasota, Florida USA
- Galería 9, Lima, Peru
- Park Gallery, Fort Lauderdale, Florida USA
- Galería 1.2.3., San Salvador, El Salvador
- Galería Acquavella, Caracas, Venezuela
- Corbino Galleries, Sarasota, Florida USA
- Galería Arte Actual, Santiago, ChiLe
- Corbino Galleries, Sarasota, Florida USA
- Gallery Camino Real, Boca Raton, Florida USA
- Gutierrez Fine Arts, Key Biscayne, Florida USA
- Galería Etcetera, Panama City, Panama
- Galería 1.2.3., San Salvador, El Salvador
- Galería 9, Lima, Peru
- Baumgartner Galleries, Washington, D.C USA
- Forma Gallery, Coral Gables, Florida USA
- Galería 1.2.3., San Salvador, El Salvador
- Savannah College of Art & Design, Savannah, Georgia USA
- Galería Coabey, San Juan, Puerto Rico
- Galería Etcetera, Panama City, Panama
- Forma Gallery, Coral Gables, Florida USA 1978/79/80/81/82
- Galería Coabey, San Juan, P.R.
- Bacardi Art Gallery, Miami, Florida USA

=== Collective ===
Shared exhibits of Calzada's artwork between 1978 and 2010.

==== 2000–2010 ====
Premiere of "Calzada" A documentary by Eduardo Montes-Bradley

Premiere of "Calzada". Humberto Calzada premiere speech.

- Beaux Arts Gallery, Miami International Art Fair, Miami Beach, Florida USA
- Beaux Arts Gallery, Art Palm Beach, West Palm Beach, Florida USA
- Polk Museum of Art, Works by Artists of Cuban Ancestry From the Permanent Collection, Lakeland, Florida USA
- Iris and B. Gerald Cantor Art Gallery, Co-Sponsored by The Holy Cross Latin American and Latino Studies Concentration, "Layers: Collecting Cuban-American Art."
- Boca Raton Museum of Art, "Masters of Latin America: Selections from the Joan and Milton Bagley Collection, Boca Raton, Florida
- Cuba Art New York, New York "A Sense of Space: Cuban Artists and Architecture"
- University of Buffalo Art Gallery, Center for the Arts, ""Layers: Collecting Cuban-American Art"
- Miami Art Central, Cisneros Fontanals Art Foundation, "Hope and Glory: The Enduring Legacy of Oscar B. Cintas"
- King Fine Arts "Three Cuban Masters, Three Visions of One Reality," New York
- Kendall Campus Art Gallery, MDCC, "Art Trends: Miami's Trek III: A Decade of Art in Miami", Miami, Florida
- Lowe Art Museum, "From Modern to Contemporary: Cuban and Cuban- American Art From the Permanent Collection," Coral Gables, Florida
- Galería Arte Consult, "Memoria: Veinte Años," Panama, Republic of Panama
- Illinois Department of Commerce and Community Affairs, "Images and Reflections," Springfield, Illinois.

==== 1990–2000 ====
- "Breaking Barriers: Contemporary Cuban Art" Art Museum of Ft. Lauderdale, Florida.
- Tampa Museum of Art, Tampa, Florida. USA
- Galeria 1.2.3., "Latin American Art Biennial," San Salvador, El Salvador
- Miami University Art Museum, "Changing Images from the Americas," Oxford, Ohio
- Museum of Art, "Cuban Artists of the Twentieth Century," Ft Lauderdale, Florida USA
- Museu de Arte Moderna, "Eco Art," Rio de Janeiro, Brazil
- "CUBA - U.S.A.: The First Generation"
- Museum of Contemporary Art, Chicago, Illinois USA
- Fondo del Sol, Washington, D.C. USA
- Minnesota Museum of American Art, St. Paul, Minn USA
- The Museum at Florida International University, Miami, Florida USA
- Museum of Art, "South Florida Invitational," Fort Lauderdale, Florida USA
- Northwood Institute, "Leading Hispanic Artists of South FLorida," West Palm Beach, Florida USA
- Main Library, Metro-Dade Cultural Center, "Miami Artists—Fifty Years of Collecting," Miami, Florida USA

==== 1980–1990 ====
- "MIRA! Canadian Club Hispanic Art Tour III":
- Art Museum of the Americas, (OAS, Organization of American States) "Hispanic-American Artists of the United States," Washington, D.C. USA
- Municipal Art Center, Los Angeles, California USA
- Meadows Museum and Sculpture Court, Dallas, Texas USA
- Bass Museum of Art, Miami Beach, Florida USA
- Terra Museum of American Art, Chicago, Illinois USA
- Museo del Barrio, New York USA
- Museo Nacional de Bellas Artes, "Acquisitions from the Last 10 Years," Santiago, República de Chile
- "Latin American Artists from the Southeast Coastal Region": Contemporary Art Center, New Orleans, Louisiana USA
- The Art and Culture Center of Hollywood, Hollywood, Florida USA
- National Library of Canada, "Cuban Artists in North America," Ottawa, Canada
- "Outside Cuba/ Fuera de Cuba": Jane Zimmerli Art Museum, New Brunswick, New Jersey USA
- Museum of Contemporary Hispanic Art, New York USA
- Miami University Art Museum, Oxford, Ohio USA
- Museo de Arte de Ponce, Ponce, Puerto Rico
- Center for the Fine Arts, Miami, Florida USA
- Atlanta College of Art, Atlanta, Georgia USA
- Georgia State University Art Gallery, "Visual Arts: the Southeast Atlanta, Georgia USA
- Stedman Art Gallery, "Rutgers National 85/86, Works on Paper," Rutgers University, Camden, New Jersey USA
- Thomas Center Gallery, "Expatriates:Paintings by 15 Young Latin American Artists," GainesvILle, Florida USA
- Instituto Cultural Domecq, "V Bienal Iberoamericana de Arte," Mexico D.F., Mexico
- South Campus Art Gallery, "American Artists of Cuban Origin,"Miami-Dade Community College, Miami, Florida
- Cuban Museum of Arts and Culture, "The Miami Generation," Miami, Florida USA
- Meridian House International, Washington, D.C. USA
- The Balch Institute, Philadelphia, Pennsylvania USA
- "VI Latin American Graphics Biennial Exhibition" San Juan, Puerto Rico
- North Miami Museum and Art Center, "Five in FLorida Plus Two," North Miami, Florida USA
- Museum of Art, "Hort Memorial Exhibition," Fort Lauderdale, Florida USA
- Gallery Camino Real, "Five Contemporary Realists," Boca Raton, Florida USA
- Art Museum of the Americas (OAS, Organization of American States) "Recent Acquisitions," Washington, D.C. USA
- "IV Biennial Art Exhibition of Medellín," Medellín, Colombia
- Moss Gallery, "Contemporary Cuban Painting," San Francisco, California USA

==== 1970–1980 ====
- "The Cuban Exhibition," De Armas Gallery, Editorial America, Miami, Florida USA
- Lowe Art Museum "Latin American Artists of the Southeastern United States", Coral Gables, Florida USA

== Public and corporate collections ==
- Archer M. Huntington Art Gallery, University of Texas at Austin, Texas
- Art Museum, Fort Lauderdale, Florida
- Art Museum of the Americas, Organization of American States (OAS), Washington, D.C.
- Bass Museum of Art, Miami Beach, Florida
- Centro de Arte Fundacion Ortiz-Guardian, Granada, Nicaragua
- Lehigh University Art Galleries, Bethlehem, Pennsylvania
- Lowe Art Museum, University of Miami, Coral Gables, Florida
- Meadows Museum and Sculpture Court, Dallas, Texas
- Miami University Museum, Oxford, Ohio
- Museo de Arte Contemporaneo Maria Zambrana, Velez-Málaga, Spain
- Museo de Arte Contemporaneo de Panama, Republica de Panama
- Museo de Arte de Ponce, Ponce, PR
- Museo Nacional de Bellas Artes, Santiago, Chile
- Norton Gallery & School of Art, West Palm Beach, Florida
- Polk Museum of Art, Lakeland, Florida
- St. Louis Art Museum, St. Louis, Missouri
- The Museum at Florida International University, Miami, Florida
- The University Museum, Southern Illinois University at Edwardsville, Illinois
- Zimmerli Art Museum, Rutgers University, New Brunswick, New Jersey
- Florida International University, Primera Casa, Miami, Florida
- University of Miami, Goizueta Pavilion, Coral Gables, Florida
- Miami-Dade Community College South Campus Art Gallery, Miami, Florida
- Miami-Dade County Department of Cultural Affairs, Art in Public Places Collection, Miami International Airport, Miami, Florida
- Cintas Foundation, Institute of International Education, New York
- Federal Reserve Bank of Atlanta, Miami Branch Office
- Gulf & Western Industries, La Romana, Dominican Republic
- Banco de Viscaya, Miami, Florida

== Bibliography ==
- "¡MIRA! Diferencias en el Arte Norteamericano y Latinoamericano". Arte en Colombia. 38: 36–38. December 1988.
- "Arnaldo Roche y Humberto Calzada: Estudios en Contraste". Arte en Colombia. 46: 119. January 1991.
- "Surrealist Influences in the Works of the Exiled". The Washington Times: 38. June 21, 1984.
- "Calzada's Dreamy, Post-Modern Edifices". Herald Tribune (Sarasota, FLorida): 21. July 15, 1994.
- "Calzada Aims for More than Shape". Herald Tribune, Guide to Entertainment, (Sarasota, Florida): 26. July 21, 2000.
- Alvarez-Bravo, Armando (October 6, 1990). El Nuevo Herald, Nuevo Arte Hispano (in Spanish). West Palm Beach, Florida: Miami Herald. p. 30.
- "Humberto Calzada" El Nuevo Herald, November 17, 1990, pp. 1D, 4D
- "Las Imágenes Diversas," El Nuevo Herald, June 24, 1992, p1 D, 4 D
- "Calzada: Edificaciones con Arte en el Arte," El Nuevo Herald, February 17, 1993, p. 4D
- "Calzada, Cada Vez Mejor," El Nuevo Herald, Seccion Viernes de Galeria, October 7, 1994, p. 29D
- "Exposicion de Humberto Calzada," El Nuevo Herald, Artes y Letras, AprIL 25, 1999, p. 2E
- "El Universo Fantastico de Humberto Calzada" El Nuevo Herald, Artes y Letras March 19, 2000, pp. 1E-2E
- "Humberto Calzada: Cuba y la Noche," El Nuevo Herald, Artes y Letras, March 18, 2001, p1-E.
- "Humberto Calzada: La Casa Ideal Para lo Cubano", El Nuevo Herald, Artes y Letras February 16, 2003, p. 1E
- "Humberto Calzada: Desde La Luz Azul", El Nuevo Herald, Artes y Letras, November 2, 2003, p. 1E

== Documentaries ==
Eduardo Montes-Bradley (Director) (January 2010). Calzada (Digital HD). USA: Heritage Film Project.
