= Rolex Submariner =

Line of sports watches by Rolex

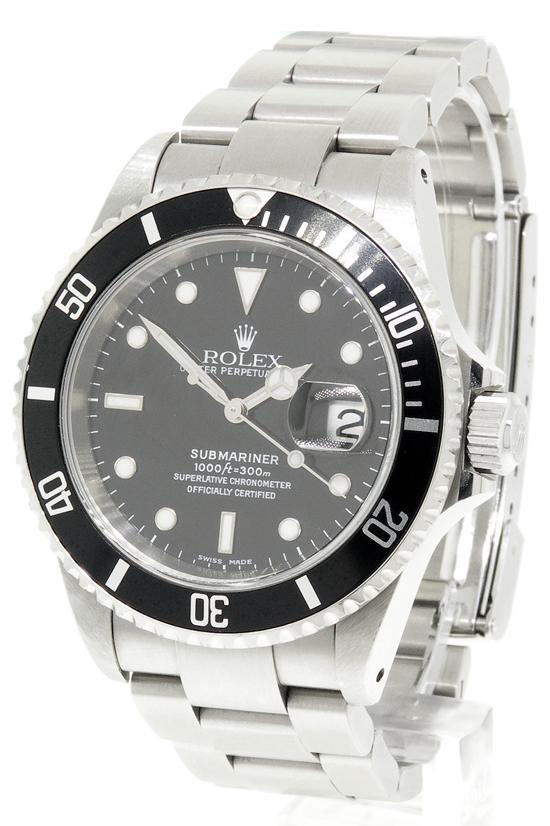
- Rolex Submariner-Date ref.16610, with a water resistance of 300 meters (1000 feet). Model 16610 was produced from 1987 to 2010.
- Type: Automatic
- Display: Analogue
- Introduced: 1953

The Rolex Submariner is a line of sports watches designed for diving and manufactured by Rolex, resistant to water and corrosion. The first Submariner was introduced to the public in 1954 at the Basel Watch Fair. It was the first watch to be waterproof up to 100 metres (330 ft), although Blancpain's Fifty Fathoms watch, which was introduced in 1953, was certified to 94.5m (being fifty Fathoms). The Rolex Submariner is considered "a classic among wristwatches", manufactured by one of the world's most widely recognized luxury brands. Due to its huge popularity, there are many homage watches by well-established watchmakers, as well as illegal counterfeits. The Rolex Submariner is part of Rolex's Professional line.

Today, the Submariner and Submariner Date models are equipped with Rolex Calibres 3230 and 3235, respectively, and feature luminescent hour markers, a unidirectional rotatable bezel with Cerachrom ceramic insert, and a solid-link Oyster bracelet. The models underwater diving depth rating is 300 metres (1,000 ft).

== Early models ==
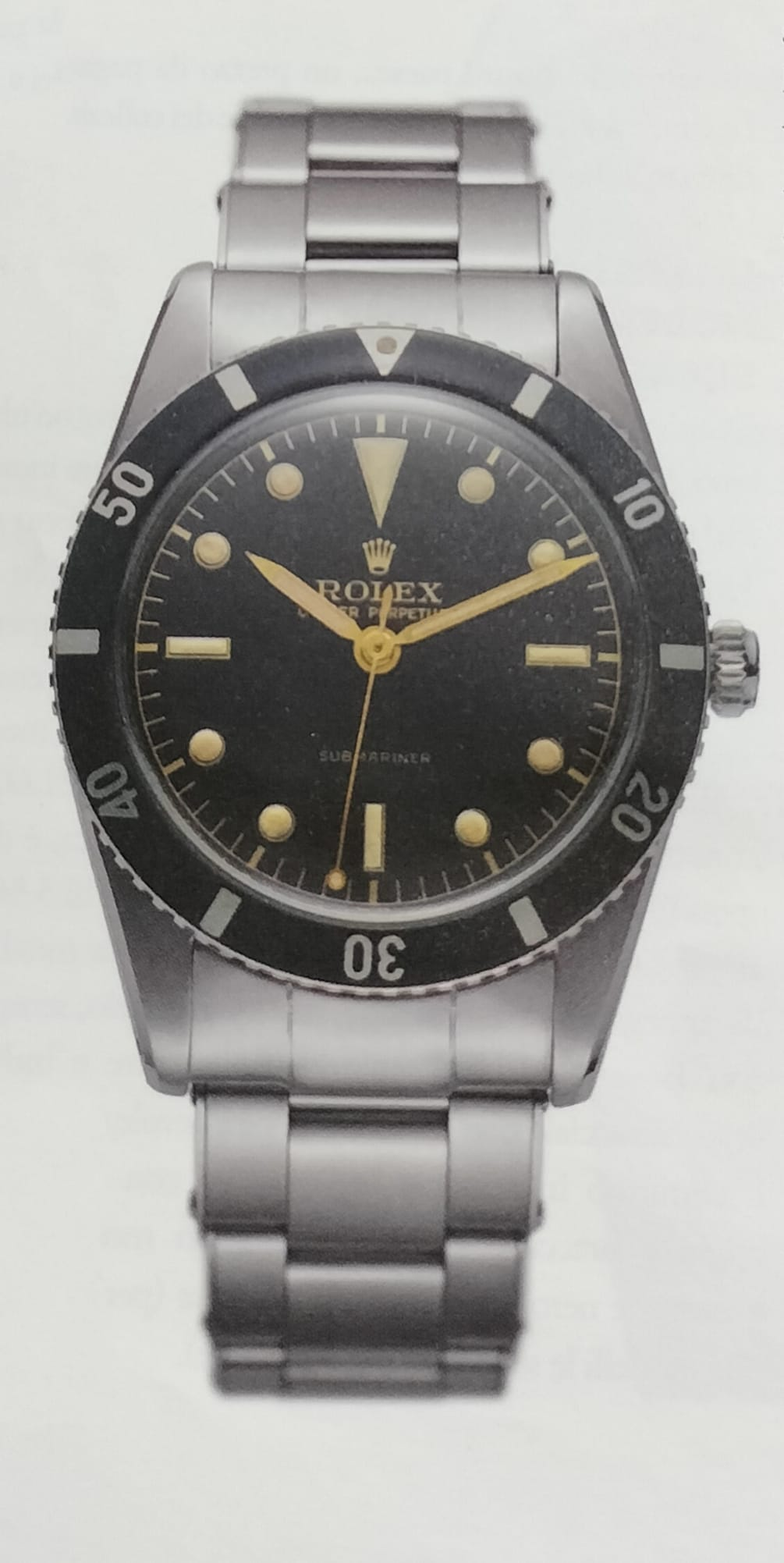
Rolex Submariner ref. 6204 from 1953

The Submariner model went into production in 1953 and was showcased at the Basel Watch Fair in 1954. This first Submariner's assigned case reference number was either 6204 or 6205. It is unclear which model came first; in any event, the two watches are nearly identical. Neither had the distinctive "cathedral" or "Mercedes" hands later so strongly associated with the Submariner line. Rather, both of these early submariners have straight "pencil" style hands. The upside-down triangle at 12 o’clock; baton-shaped markers at 3, 6 and 9 o’clock; and dot markers for the remaining hours on the dail were design elements found in all later Submariner and other Rolex diving watch models.

Both the 6204 and 6205 were fitted with the A260 movement and the watch cases had a diameter of 37.0 mm (1.46 in). Neither model displayed a depth rating on the dial. The 6204 was originally rated to a depth of 100 meters (330 feet), but by 1954, Rolex certified the watch as waterproof to 200 meters (660 feet) in the accompanying catalog. The 6205 was depth rated to 100 meters (330 feet).

Some 6204 models have the Submariner logo printed below the center pinion, while others have the logo blacked out. Few, if any, of the 6205 watches bear the name "Submariner" on the dial, a major distinction of modern Submariners. It is believed that there were unexpected trademark issues connected with the name "Submariner" at the time the 6204 and 6205 were released, accounting for the inconsistent use of the Submariner mark on these early Submariners. Trademark irregularities notwithstanding, both the 6204 and 6205 are designated Submariner models in Rolex product literature.

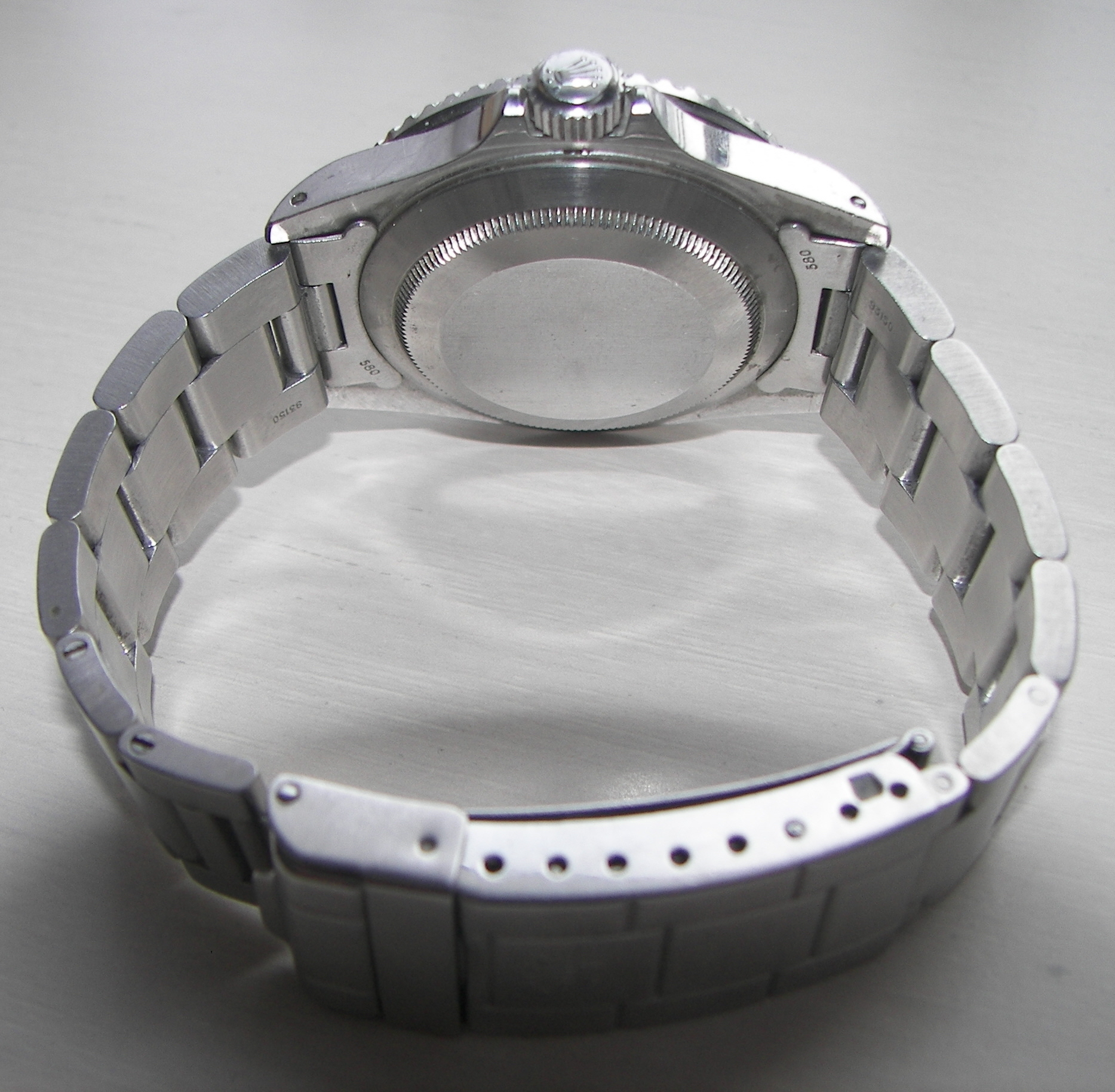
The back of pre-2008 stainless steel Submariner, with original Rolex green sticker removed

In 1954, Rolex also produced a small number of ref. 6200 Submariners. This was the first Submariner (although not the first Rolex) to make use of the Mercedes handset, a feature of all subsequent Submariners. The 6200 also featured an oversized winding crown compared to the 6204 and 6205 models. While the Rolex Submariner 6200 was produced after the models 6204 and 6205, it is the lowest-numbered Submariner in existence. It has been nicknamed the “King Sub” and its unique features included an Explorer style 3-6-9 dial. The Reference 6200 also carried a slightly higher water resistance rating than its predecessors due to a slightly thicker case.

Within a few years, Rolex revised its Submariner line, producing the 6536 (small crown) and 6538 (oversized crown) models. These watches had "improved" movements (the cal. 1030), including a chronometer version in some 6536 models (designated 6536/1), the now-familiar Mercedes hands, and the Submariner logo and depth rating printed on the dial. In 1959 the watch case was upscaled to a diameter of 40.0 mm (1.57 in).

By the early 1960s, these models had given way to the 5508 (small crown) and 5510 (large crown) models. All of these early Submariners used either gilt (6200, 6204, 6205) or gilt/silver gilt (6536, 6538) printing on glossy black dials. The 5508 is also the first reference of the Submariner to start using tritium-infused paint to illuminate the dial, instead of more dangerous radium paint.

The next wave of Submariners, the 5512 (chronometer version) and 5513 (non-chronometer), marked a significant change in the appearance of the popular Rolex design. "Shoulders" were added to the case's crown side to protect the winding/setting mechanism and the Submariner case diameter was increased to 40.0 mm (1.57 in). In early watches—until 1964, these shoulders were pyramid-shaped and ended in points. Later watches were manufactured with rounded shoulders. The 5512 and 5513 were both fitted with the oversized crown, which thereafter became a standard feature of the Submariner line. In the early 1960s, Rolex discontinued the use of radium paint for the luminous indices, switching to safer tritium-infused paint.

In 1965–1966, Rolex discontinued using gilt/silver gilt dials on the Submariner watches, switching to white printing. A final important change came with the introduction of the 1680 model in the late 1960s: the 1680 was the first Submariner to be equipped with a date function, marking the completion of the transition of the Submariner line from specialist no-frills utilitarian tool watch for scuba divers to mass market fashion accessory. While many professional and military divers used—and continue to use—Submariners in the most demanding underwater environments, by the late 1960s, the watch had undeniably become a mass-market product as well.

== Later models ==
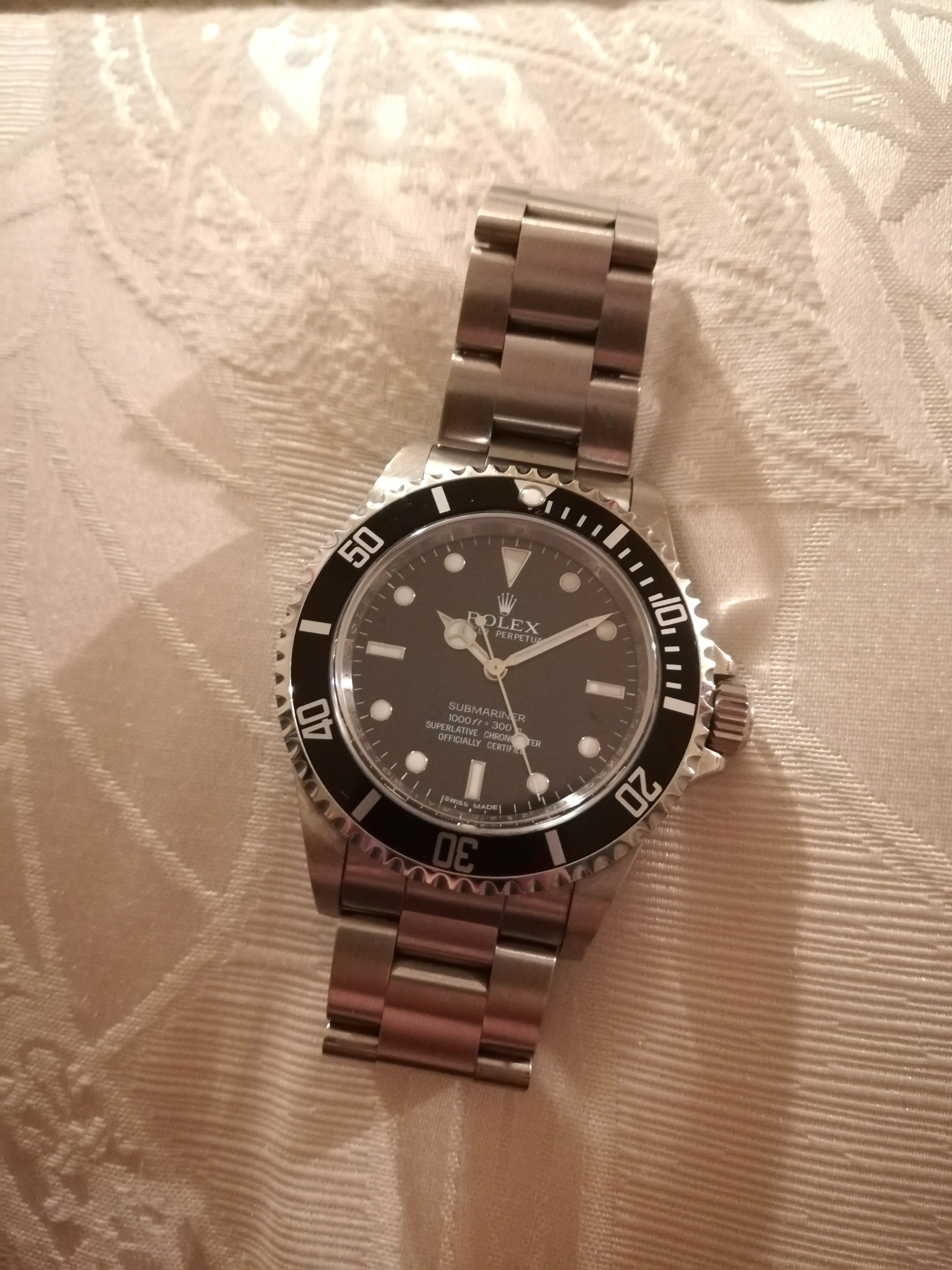
Submariner No-Date ref. 14060M-0001, produced from 1998 to 2007

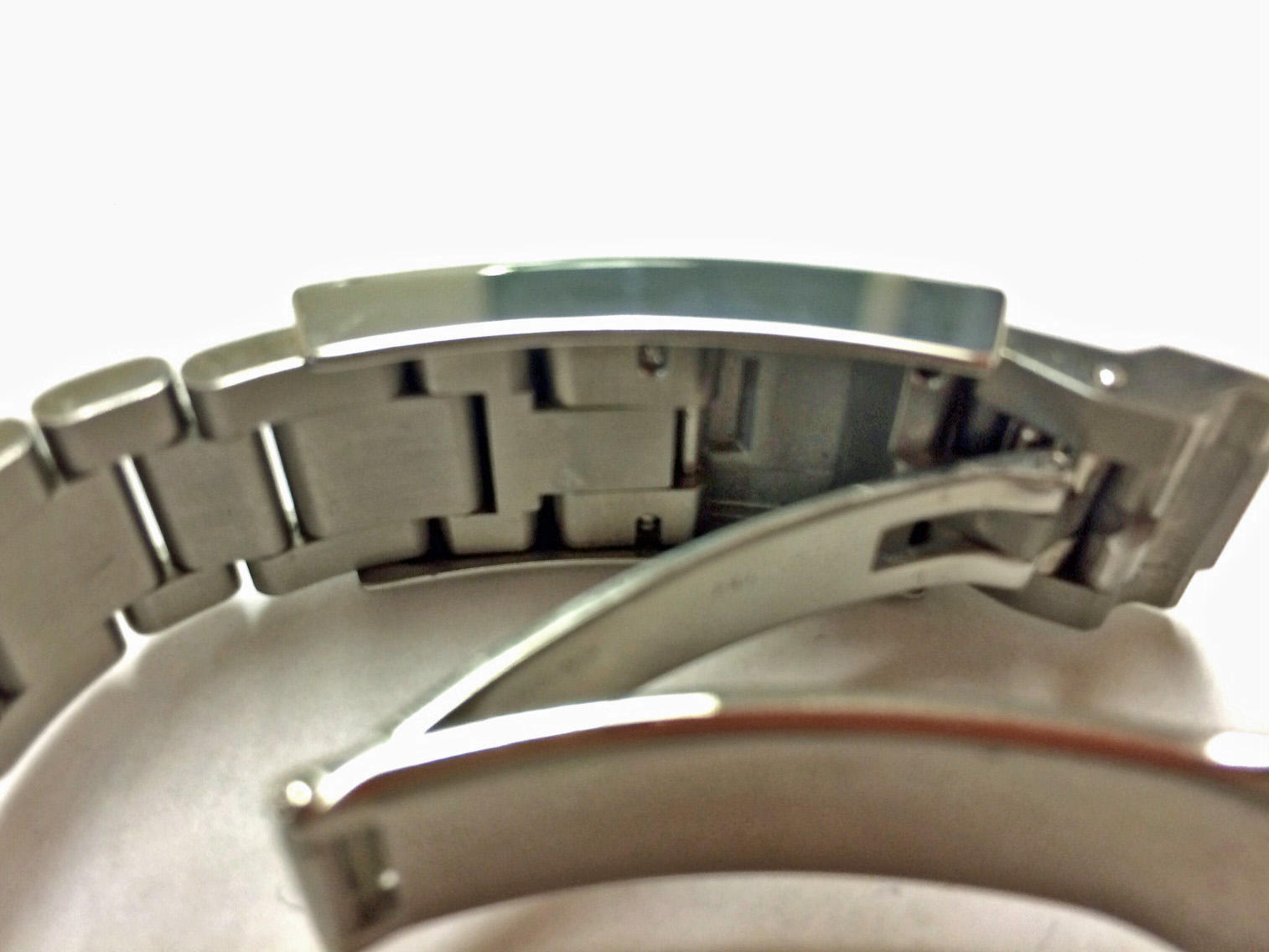
Rolex "Glidelock" micro adjustment deployant clasp

Throughout the next 40 years, the Submariner was updated with improved water resistance, new movements, and numerous small cosmetic changes. In 2003, Rolex celebrated the Submariner's 50th anniversary by launching the Rolex Submariner-Date anniversary edition (16610 LV), with distinguishing features such as the green bezel and Maxi dial; its production ended in 2010 with the final watches being issued with the new "random" serial number.

A new Submariner-Date, model 116613 (not to be confused with model 16613), based on the "Super Case" used in the GMT Master II, was presented at the 2008 Basel show. It featured heavier lugs and crown guards, enlarged "Chromalight" hour markers and broader hands for increased legiability, a Cerachrom ceramic bezel, and a quick-adjust function "Glidelock" clasp. The first Submariner-Date models offered were a yellow gold with a blue face and bezel and a new white gold with a blue face and bezel. The stainless steel case Submariner-Date model was presented at the 2010 Basel show. Its reference is 116610. An anti-reflective coating was applied to the inner side of the sapphire crystal. The steel 14060M did not have these modifications.

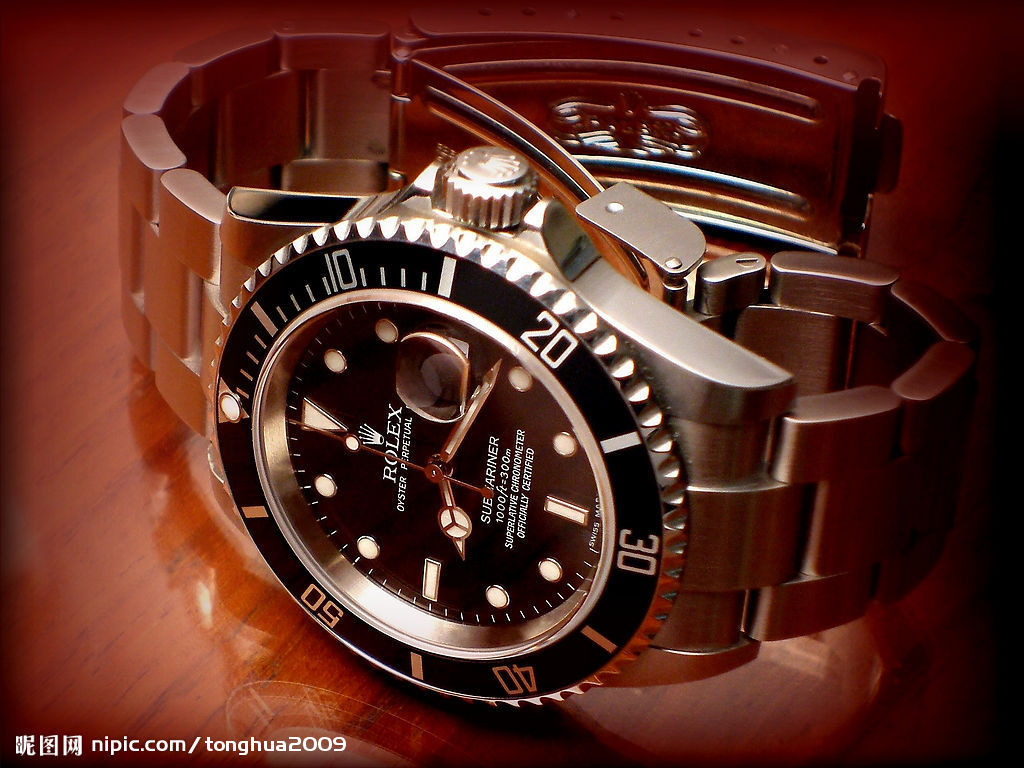
"Super Case" Submariner-Date ref.116610LN, produced from 2010 to 2020

At the 2012 BaselWorld watch show, an updated steel Submariner No-Date ref 114060 was introduced. It replaced the 14060M, with the newer "Super Case" with wider lug end shoulders, enlarged crown guards, and other preceding Date model updates like enlarged "Chromalight" hour markers and broader hands for increased visibility, ceramic bezel inlay, blue Parachrom hairspring and bracelet with solely solid links featuring ceramic axle sleeves to prevent premature wear or bracelet stretch and a "Glidelock" extension system allowing for up to 20.0 mm (0.79 in) of total adjustment in 2.0 mm (0.079 in) increments without the use of any tools.

The Rolex Submariner "Super Case" has a diameter of 40.0 mm (1.57 in) and a thickness of 13.0 mm (0.51 in) (crystal thickness 2.0 mm (0.079 in)), and the case and bracelet weigh 155 g (5.5 oz).

At the year 2020 Rolex retired the chunky looking "Super Case" by introducing a slightly enlarged watch case styled more to pre-"Super Case" slimmer looking Submariner models which has a depending on the source a 40.5 or 41.0 mm (1.59 or 1.61 in) diameter, a thickness of 12.3 mm (0.48 in) and an anti-reflective coating applied on the inner side of the crystal. Like the watch case, the lug width has also been enlarged to 21.0 mm (0.83 in). The No-Date model features a caliber 3230 movement and the Date model features a caliber 3235 movement. Both are COSC certified.

Since the 2020 changes to the Rolex Submariner, the watch has remained virtually the same. The current line is based around the Reference 126610LN, which expanded the line’s power reserve to about 70 hours.

== Special edition models ==
=== Military ===
In 1971, the Royal Navy ordered a military version of the Submariner, the Ref. A/6538, which featured fixed-lugs, and a raised and larger bezel. Further references including the Ref. 5513 and 5517 were later issued with broadsword style hands, and fully-graduated bezels. Collectively, they are colloquially referred to as 'Milsubs'.

In 1975, the South African Army used factory-modified versions of the Ref. 5513 in the country's intervention in the Angolan Civil War in 1975, known as Operation Savannah, with a black coating on the case to minimise reflections from the sun.

=== COMEX ===
From 1970 onwards, the French diving company COMEX received a special version of Rolex Submariner 5513 featuring a helium release valve for their saturation divers. This version of the Submariner was based on the Sea Dweller designed for the needs of professional divers working at great depths and not the other way around as often claimed. In 1974, the first double-signed dials featuring the Comex logo were introduced followed by changing the reference number to 5514, thus creating an exclusive reference for Comex. These 200 meters (660 feet) depth rated watches were never available to the public and did not feature a date function like the Sea-Dweller watches.

== Production and market value ==
Rolex has disclosed that approximately 4 million Submariner watches were produced between 1953 and 2020. Based on current market prices, this equates to an estimated value of $46 billion for this period. Including production from 2020 onwards, Submariner watches' total value could exceed $50 billion. While the luxury watch market has experienced significant growth and volatility, precise figures for annual Rolex production have yet to be discovered. However, it is generally estimated that Rolex produces around one million timepieces annually.

== Current models ==
Model number	Model	Material	Bezel	Movement	Production	USD MSRP
124060	Submariner 41 mm	Steel	Black	3230 COSC	2020-	$10,050
126610LN	Submariner Date 41 mm	Steel	Black	3235 COSC	2020-	$11,350
126610LV	Submariner Date 41 mm	Steel	Green	3235 COSC	2020–	$11,900
126613LB	Submariner Date 41 mm	Steel and Yellow Gold	Blue	3235 COSC	2020–	$19,450
126613LN	Submariner Date 41 mm	Steel and Yellow Gold	Black	3235 COSC	2020–	$19,450
126618LB	Submariner Date 41 mm	Yellow Gold	Blue	3235 COSC	2020–	$50,900
126618LN	Submariner Date 41 mm	Yellow Gold	Black	3235 COSC	2020–	$50,900
126619LB	Submariner Date 41 mm	White Gold	Blue	3235 COSC	2020–2026	$52,100

All models feature 300-meter (1000 feet) water resistance.

== Discontinued models ==
Model number	In production	Note
6200	1955	
6204	1953	
6205	1953–1957	
6536	1954–1958	
6536/1	1955–1961	
A/6538	1957	
6538	1958-1961	
5508	1958–1965	
5510	1959	
5512	1959–1978	
5513	1962–1990	
5513/17	1972–1978	
5514	1972–1978	
5517	1972–1978	
1680	1966–1981	
16800	1977–1987	
168000	1987	
16610	1988–2010	
14060	1990–2002	No date
14060M	2002–2012	Certified chronometer 2007–2012
16610LV	2003–2010	50th anniversary model; Lunette Verte (Green Bezel)
114060	2012–2020	No date
116610LN	2010 - 2020	Lunette Noir (Black Bezel)
116610LV	2010 - 2020	Lunette Verte (Green Bezel)
116619LB	2008 - 2020	Lunette Bleu (Blue Bezel)

== Submariner spinoff ==
The Rolex Sea-Dweller, specifically developed for saturation diving in 1967 but introduced to the general public in 1971, is a heavier-duty steel version of the Submariner, with a thicker case and (domed) crystal, as well as a date feature, minus the date magnifying lens ("cyclops"). The Sea-Dweller incorporates a helium escape valve for use when decompressing and helium is in the breathing gas mixture of a pressurized habitat; this model (ref. 16600) has a guaranteed waterproof depth of 1,220 metres (4,000 ft) and a diameter of 40.0 mm (1.57 in). In 2017 Rolex introduced a to a diameter of 43.0 mm (1.69 in) enlarged Sea-Dweller model (ref.126600 ) featuring a (flat) watch crystal with a date cyclops.

The Sea-Dweller line was supplemented by the DeepSea Sea-Dweller in late 2008, with the last 16600 Sea-Dwellers produced running into the V-series (late 2008). The DeepSea features a 44.0 mm (1.73 in) case that guarantees a depth of 3,900 metres (12,800 ft) (ref. 116660).

In late 2022 Rolex introduced the Deepsea Challenge (ref. 126067), a commercial full ocean depth capable watch featuring a 50 mm titanium alloy case. The Deepsea Challenge model does not feature a date complication unlike the Deepsea and Sea-Dweller models, which were designed for saturation diving where people have to spend multiple days in pressurized environments. The DeepSea Challenge features a 50.0 mm (1.97 in) case that guarantees a depth of 11,000 metres (36,000 ft).

== Tudor Submariner line ==
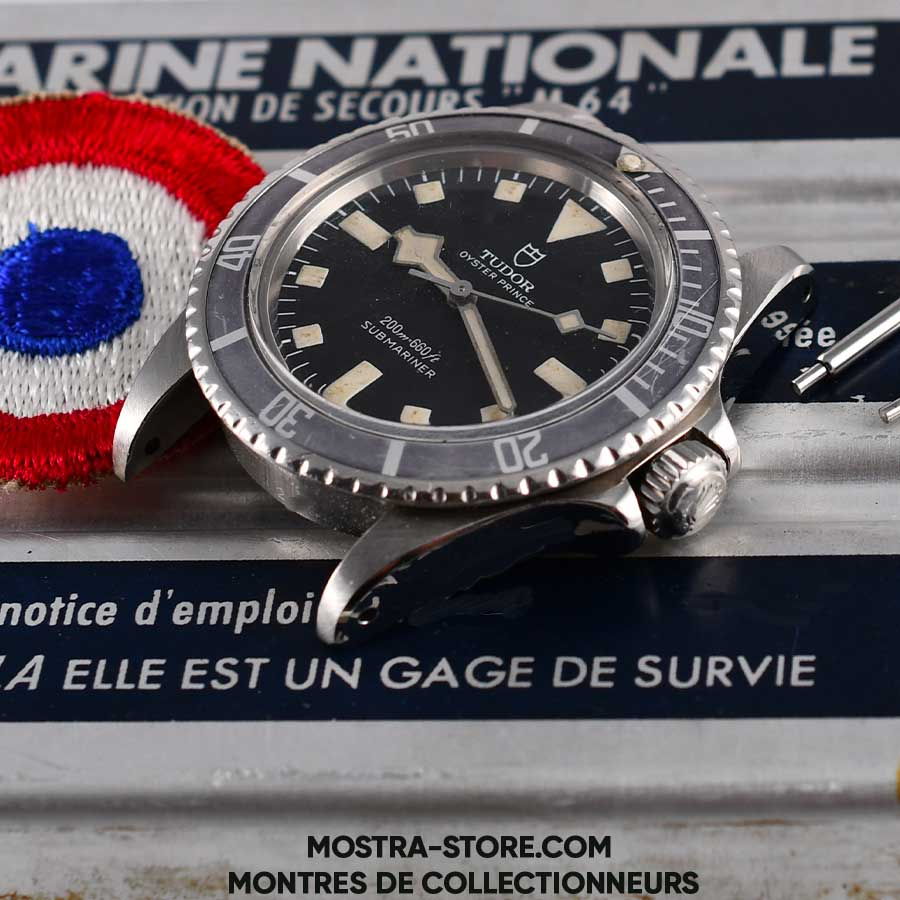
French Marine Nationale issued Tudor Submariner showcasing the brand's "snowflake" handset

Parent company Rolex SA offered and offers diving watches under the Rolex and Tudor brands. Subsidiary Montres Tudor SA offered similar designated and often similar looking diving watches for decades, following the original tool watch for scuba divers philosophy. These Tudor Submariner watches used technology and components from Rolex and other manufacturers and were marketed at a lower price point than Rolex Submariner watches. From the 1960s to 1980s, several navies issued Tudor Submariners to their divers, including the US Navy SEALs and the French Marine Nationale. In the late 1960s the Marine Nationale requested an in low-light underwater conditions easy legible watchface. This was the impetus for Tudors' "snowflake" handset, which became strongly associated with their tool watch lines.

== Model information and characteristics ==
- Waterproof to a maximum depth of 300 metres (1000 ft). Earlier models were thinner and resistant to 200 metres (660 ft).
- Triplock system waterproof crown, featuring a triple gasket system, identified by three dots on the crown. Screws down tightly onto the case tube and against the Oyster case to provide extra waterproof protection for underwater diving.
- Case made from solid block of 904L stainless steel since the 1980s, a corrosion-resistant alloy, or gold. The golds (white or yellow) are made in Rolex's foundry.
- Unidirectional bezel that enables a diver to memorize and follow immersion time. As the bezel only rotates counterclockwise, the dive time can only become "longer" in case of accidental bezel movement, averting the danger of spending too much time underwater.
- Perpetual rotor in the self-winding wristwatch mechanism, allowing the watch to run continuously, as every slight movement of the wrist winds the movement. The energy generated is stored in the mainspring, allowing the watch to continue to function with no movement for several days. Each movement is a Swiss chronometer officially certified by the COSC.
- Rolex calendar mechanism that advances to the next date at midnight in a single short rotation.
- Removable hologram on the caseback, featured until 2007.
- Recent models of the Submariner and Submariner-Date (late 2008) feature a distinctive "ROLEX ROLEX ROLEX" and serial number engraved on the "inner bezel", also known as the "Rehaut" (French) or "Flange" (English). It also contains a minuscule laser-etched Rolex Crown at the bottom of the crystal in line with 6 o'clock mark.

== James Bond ==
The Rolex Submariner has appeared in a number of James Bond films. Sean Connery wore a reference 6538 in his first four films. In Dr. No and From Russia with Love, the watch was worn with a leather strap in place of the Oyster bracelet. For Goldfinger and Thunderball, the leather strap was replaced with an undersized, tri-color striped single-pass nylon strap with a fabric keeper, often referred to as an "RAF" strap. (This strap is often erroneously described as a "NATO" strap; the Ministry of Defence "G10" or "NATO" strap was not commissioned until 1973, and produced only in admiralty grey without stripes.) George Lazenby wore a reference 5513 with an oyster bracelet in parts of On Her Majesty's Secret Service, while Roger Moore wore a reference 5513 with a 7206 riveted bracelet in his first two Bond films, Live and Let Die and The Man with the Golden Gun. Timothy Dalton is so far the last Bond actor to wear a Rolex watch in the Bond franchise; he wore a Submariner Date in his last Bond film, 1989's Licence to Kill. This watch may have been a reference 16800 or 168000, as the film was shot in the summer of 1988.

Since 1995's GoldenEye, James Bond (as portrayed by Pierce Brosnan and Daniel Craig) has exclusively worn various iterations of the Omega Seamaster.

== See also ==
- Dive watch
- Omega Seamaster
- Rolex Daytona
- Rolex Day-Date
- Rolex Datejust
- Rolex GMT Master II
- Rolex Milgauss
- Rolex Sea-Dweller
- Rolex Yacht-Master
- Rolex Explorer II
