= Vibrations per hour =

Mechanical timepiece specification

Vibrations per hour or beats per hour (vph, VPH, bph, BPH) is a mechanical timepiece specification. It is used to express the frequency of a watch movement.

VPH describes the number of times that a vibrating timekeeping component completes half a vibration cycle every hour (counting the balance wheel's back and forth movement separately, as each produces a forward movement in the escape wheel).

In contrast, when measuring the same frequency in Hertz, it describes the number of times that the component completes a whole vibration cycle in a second (counting pairs of forward movement in the escape wheel). The frequency in Hertz can therefore be multiplied by 7,200 (2 ticks × 60 seconds × 60 minutes) to determine the frequency in VPH.

A higher frequency is a higher timekeeping resolution, and usually indicates a higher precision mechanical movement. This allows a faster recovery from being knocked or bumped, with the tradeoff being a faster accumulation of wear and tear.
