= SAE 904L stainless steel =

Grade of steel

904L is an austenitic Nickel alloy. It is softer than 316L, and its molybdenum addition gives it superior resistance to localized attack (pitting and crevice corrosion) by chlorides and greater resistance reducing acids; in particular, its copper addition gives it useful corrosion resistance to all concentrations of sulfuric acid. Its high alloying content also gives it greater resistance to chloride stress corrosion cracking, but it is still susceptible. Its low carbon content makes it resistant to sensitization by welding and prevents intergranular corrosion.

It has applications in piping systems, pollution control equipment, heat exchangers, and bleaching systems.

Omega SA experimented with 904L or 'Uranus Steel' with the PloProf dive watches in 1971–72. The inspiration came from French deep sea diving company COMEX, who used this steel in their diving bells due to superior corrosion resistance in salt water. In 1985, Rolex began to utilize 904L grade steel in its watches. Beside its corrosion resistance, watch manufacturers, such as Rolex, also choose this variety of stainless steel because it takes a higher polish than 316L grade stainless steel commonly used by other watch brands such as Seiko, Omega, and Tudor.

== Composition ==
- Nickel, 23–28%
- Chromium, 19–23%
- Carbon, 0.02% maximum
- Copper, 1–2%
- Molybdenum, 4–5%
- Manganese, 2% maximum
- Silicon, 1.0% maximum
- Iron, (balance)

== Other names ==
- UNS N08904
- EN 1.4539
- SUS 904L
- SS2562

== See also ==
- SAF 2205
