= Breitling Aerospace =

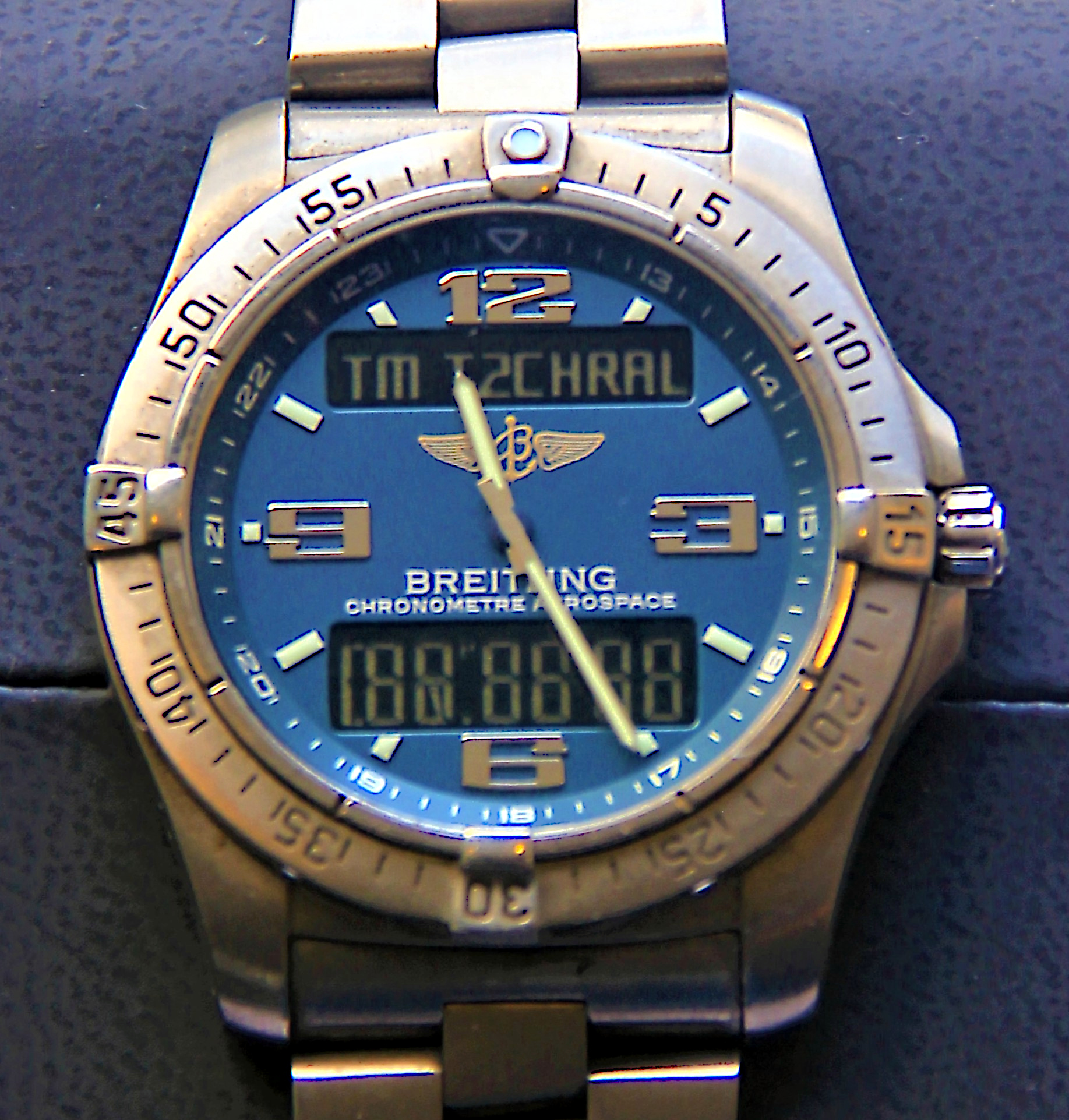
- The Breitling Aerospace Chronomètre, reference E75362, circa 2001–2004
- Manufacturer: Breitling SA
- Type: Quartz
- Display: Hybrid analogue/digital
- Introduced: 1985

The Breitling Aerospace is a multifunction chronograph pilot’s watch series with a hybrid analog/digital layout launched by Breitling SA in 1985.

== History ==
The Breitling Aerospace was introduced in 1985 with the reference number 80360, featuring 'Navitimer' on the dial, indicating it to be part of the Navitimer range, and featured a quartz movement based on the ETA 988.332.

== Special editions ==
In 2022, Breitling introduced the Aerospace Red Arrows, featuring the team's insignia on the dial.

In 2024, the brand introduced a special edition of the Aerospace, the Breitling Aerospace B70 Orbiter, to commemorate the 25th anniversary of the successful voyage of the Breitling Orbiter around the world.

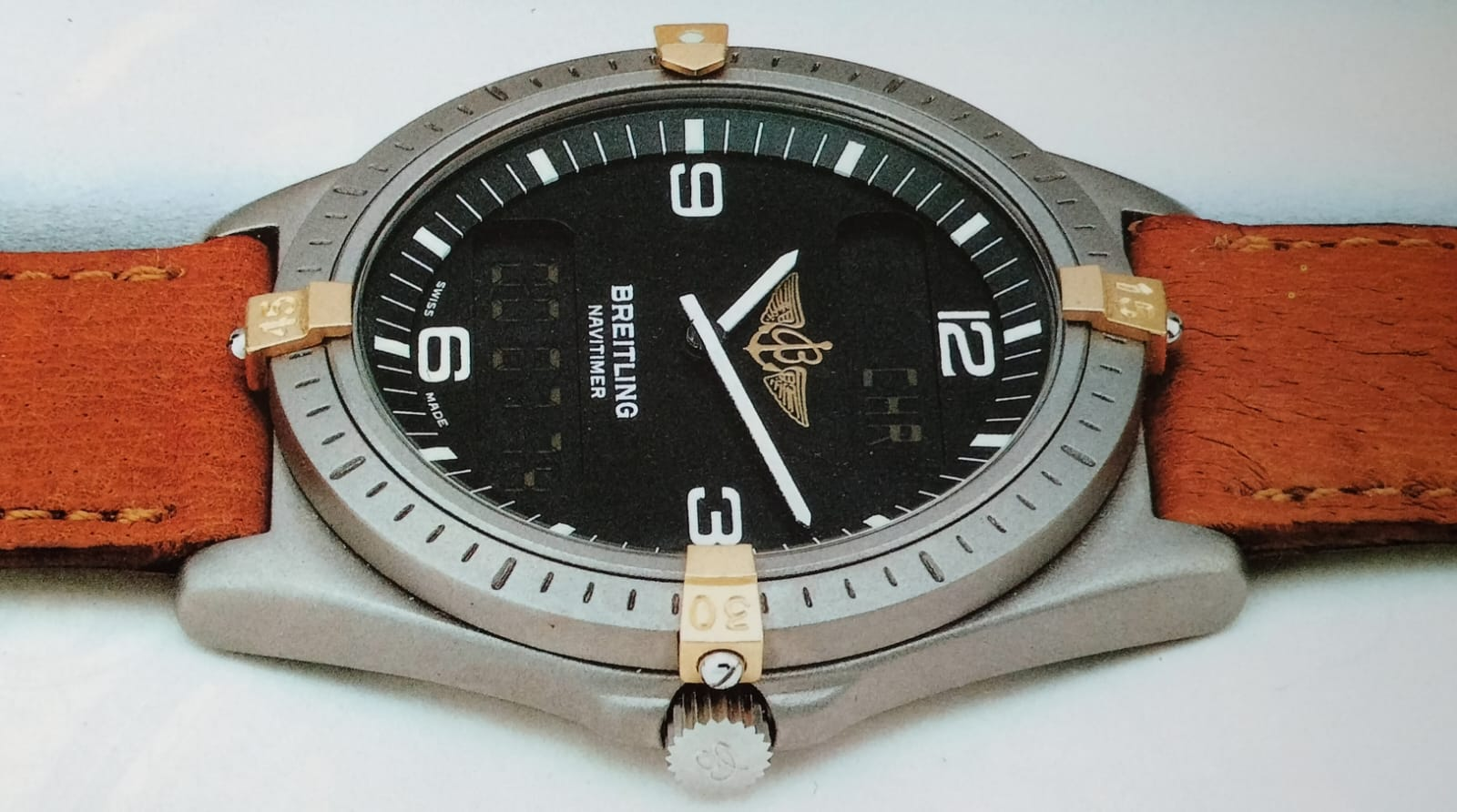
Breitling Aerospace was previously part of the Breitling Navitimer line

== See also ==
- Breitling Jet Team
- Pilot watch
