= List of Aero L-39 Albatros operators =

Current military operators Current civilian operators Former operators

This is a list of countries and their air force units that have operated the Aero L-39 Albatros.

== Military operators ==
=== Current ===
==== Abkhazia ====
Abkhazian Air Force

- 4 L-39s as of December 2009

==== Afghanistan ====
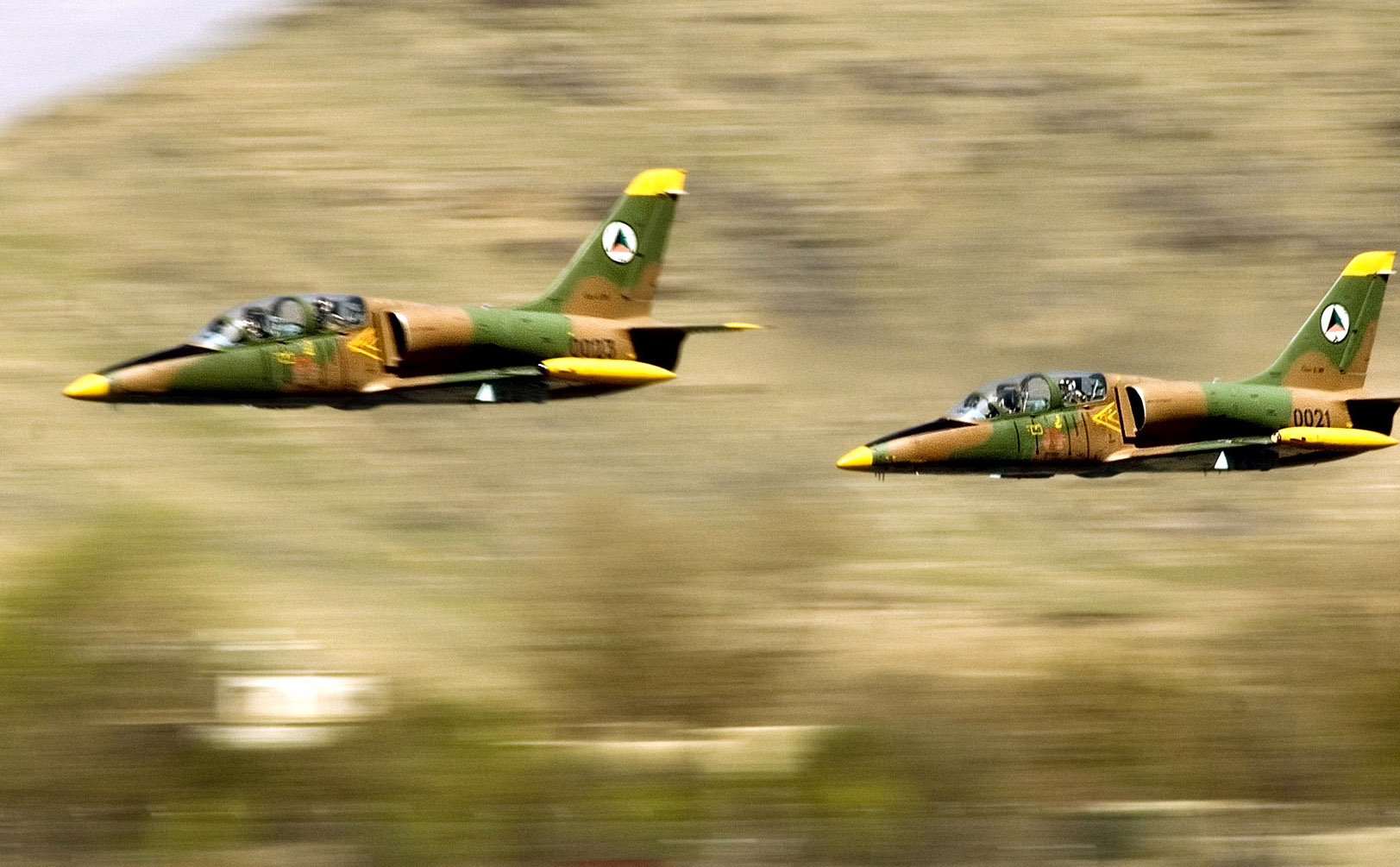
Afghan National Air Corps L-39 Albatross jets take off in a formation practice for the aerial parade in the upcoming Afghan National Day in Kabul, April 12, 2007.

Afghan Air Force

- 1 unit Active in 2024. The Afghan Air Force operated as many as 26 L-39Cs from 1977 through 2001, but only three of them survived in 2001. In December 2021, a report by Al Jazeera showed an Afghan L-39 undergoing an engine test at Kabul International Airport.

==== Algeria ====
Algerian Air Force

- 55 L-39s as of December 2020

==== Armenia ====
Armenian Air Force

- 10 aircraft as of December 2020.

==== Angola ====
National Air Force of Angola

- 4 aircraft as of December 2020.

==== Azerbaijan ====
Azerbaijan Air Force

- 12 aircraft as of December 2020.

==== Belarus ====
Belarus Air Force

- 12 aircraft as of December 2020.

==== Bulgaria ====
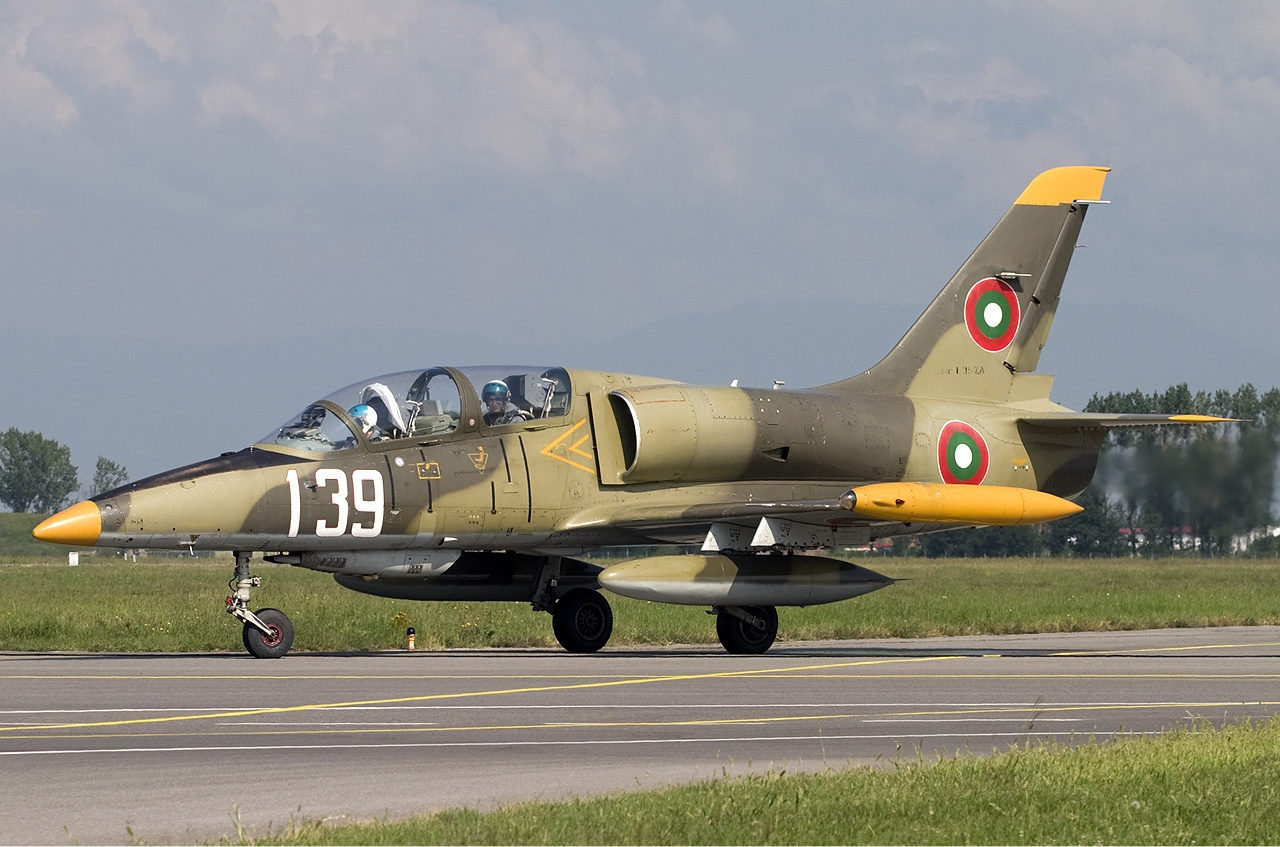
Aero L-39 Albatros of the Bulgarian Air Force

Bulgarian Air Force

- 1/12 Training Squadron operating 6 L-39ZA aircraft.

==== Central African Republic ====
Central African Republic Air Force

- 6 L-39s donated by Russia.

==== Cuba ====
Cuban Air Force

operating 26 L-39C aircraft in three squadrons:

- UM 3710 Escuadrón de Intercepcion
- UM 1660 Escuela de Ensenanza de Vuelo Avanzada
- UM 4768 Escuadrón de Intercepcion

==== Egypt ====
Egyptian Air Force

- 1 aircraft as of December 2020.

==== Equatorial Guinea ====
Armed Forces of Equatorial Guinea

- 2 aircraft as of December 2020.

==== Estonia ====
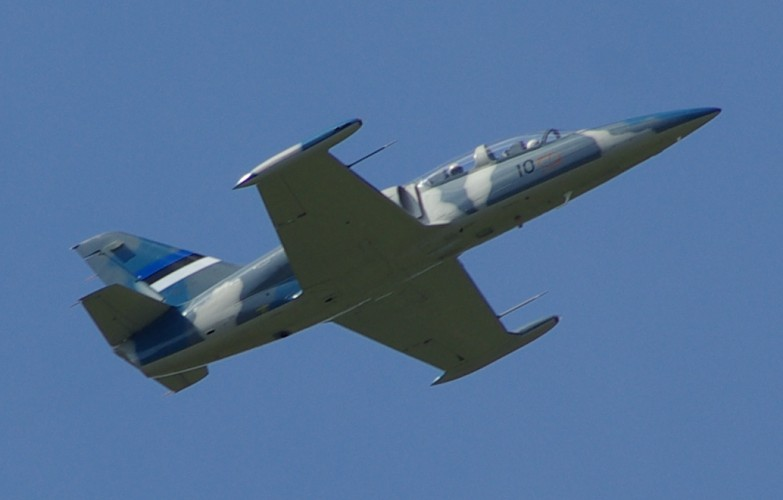
An Estonian L-39 in flight

Estonian Air Force

- 2 aircraft as of 2021.

==== Ethiopia ====
Ethiopian Air Force

- 10 aircraft as of December 2020.

==== Georgia ====
Georgian Air Force

- 8 aircraft as of December 2020.

==== Kazakhstan ====
Kazakhstan Air Force

- 17 aircraft as of December 2020.

==== Libya ====
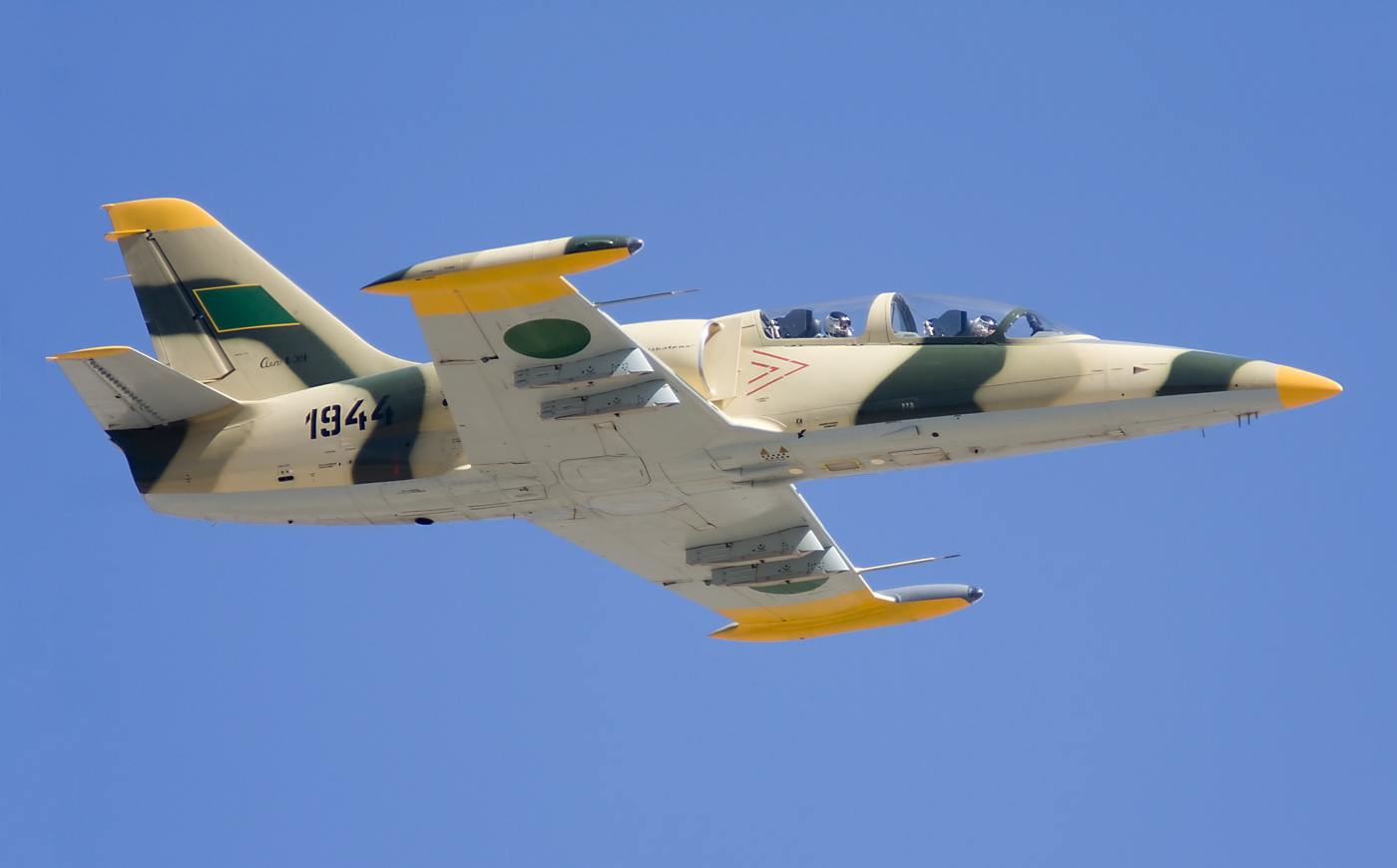
Aero L-39 Albatros working in Libyan Air Force.

Libyan Air Force

- 181x L-39ZO acquired during Gaddafi's era.
- Ten former Libyan L-39ZO delivered to Egypt.
- 10 aircraft as of December 2020.

==== Mali ====
Malian Air Force

- At least four L-39Cs delivered by Russia in August 2022.

==== Mozambique ====
Mozambique Air Force

- One L-39ZO acquired from Romania in 2013.

==== Nigeria ====
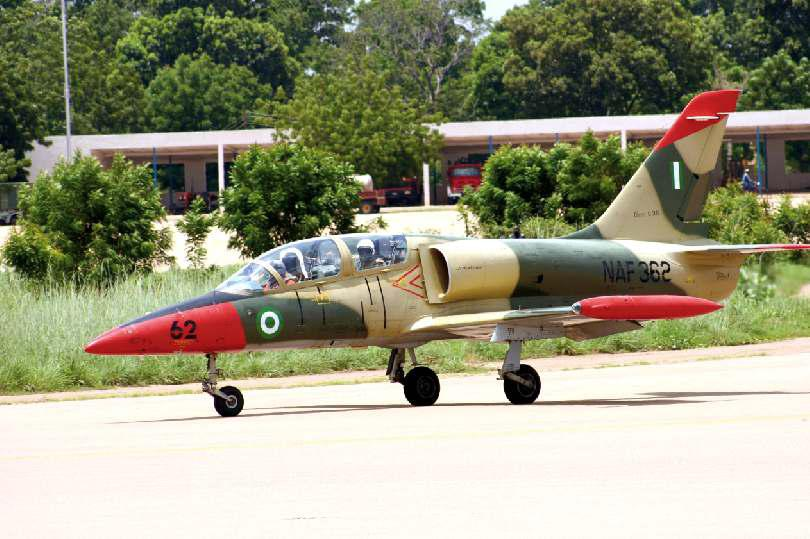
Nigerian Aero L-39.

Nigerian Air Force

- 8 aircraft as of December 2020.

==== Nicaragua ====
Nicaraguan Air Forces

==== Russia ====
Russian Air Force

- 181 aircraft as of December 2020.

==== Senegal ====
Senegalese Air Force

- 4 L-39NG on order as of December 2020.

==== Slovakia ====
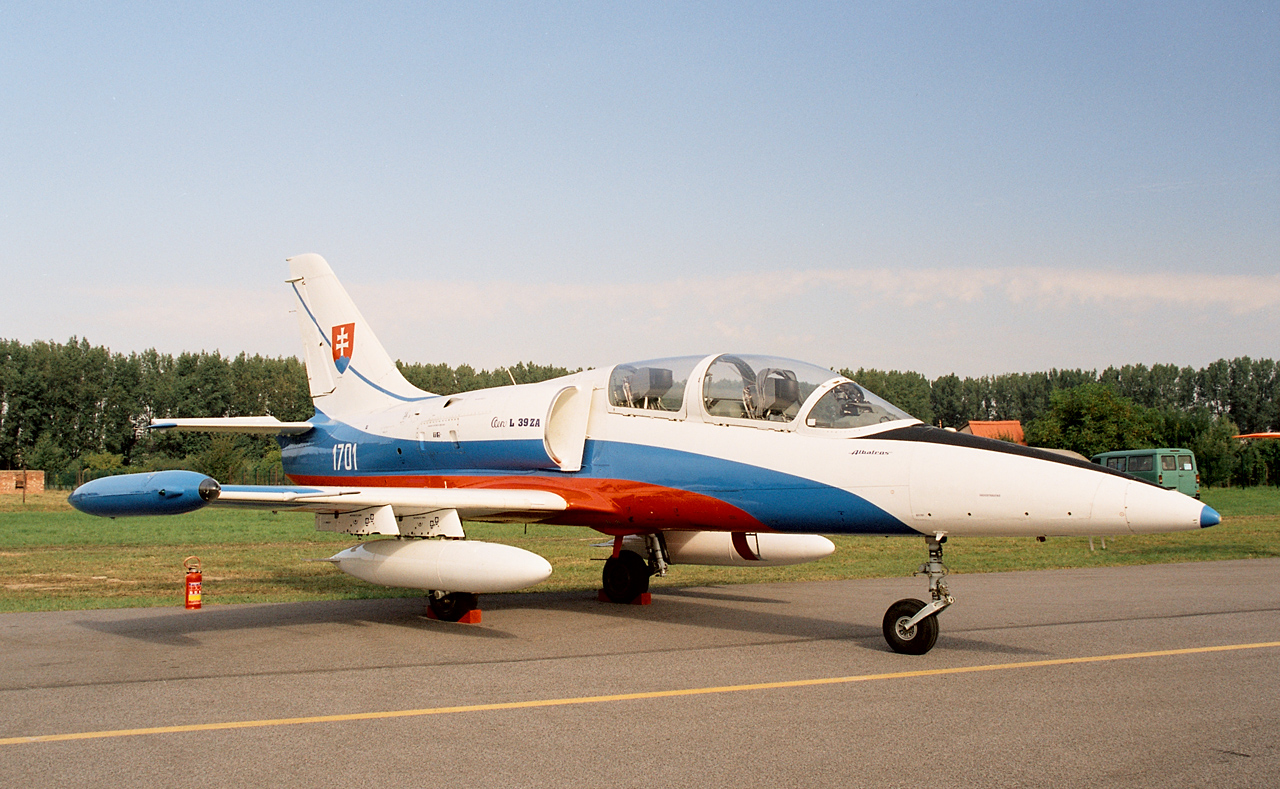
A Slovak L-39ZA (1701) in Biele Albatrosy colors at Radom Air Show 2005

Slovak Air Force

- 4x L-39C
- 4x L-39ZA
- 7 aircraft as of December 2020.

==== Tajikistan ====
Tajik Air Force

- 4 aircraft as of December 2020.

==== Tunisia ====
Tunisia Air Force

- 9 aircraft as of December 2020.

==== Uganda ====
Ugandan Air Force

- 8 L-39ZA as of December 2020.

==== Ukraine ====
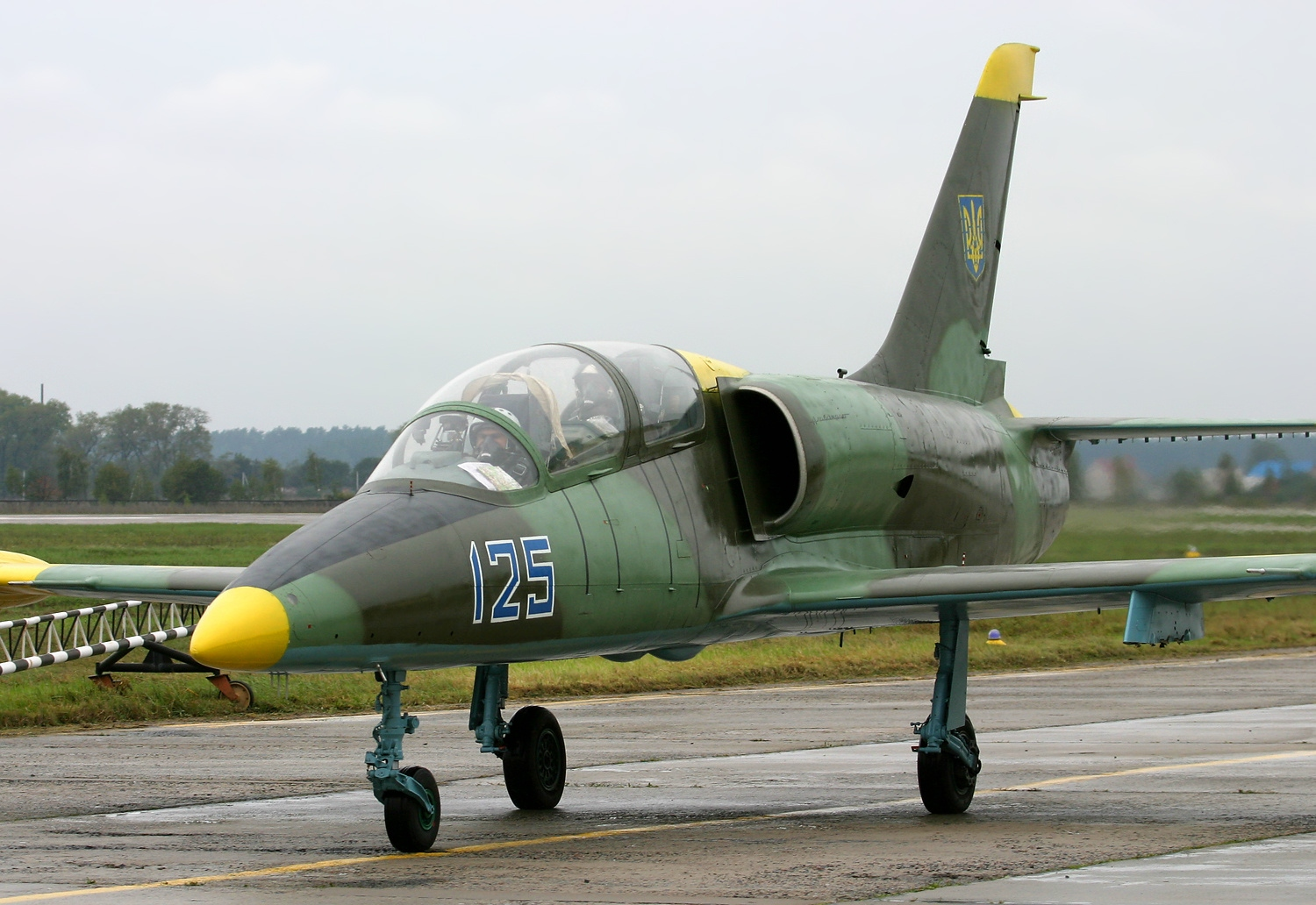
A Ukrainian L-39

Ukrainian Air Force

- 47 aircraft as of December 2020.

==== Uzbekistan ====
Uzbekistan Air Force

- 2 aircraft as of December 2020.

==== Vietnam ====
Vietnamese Air Force

- 25 aircraft as of December 2020.

==== Yemen ====
Yemen Air Force

- 28 aircraft as of December 2020.

=== Former ===
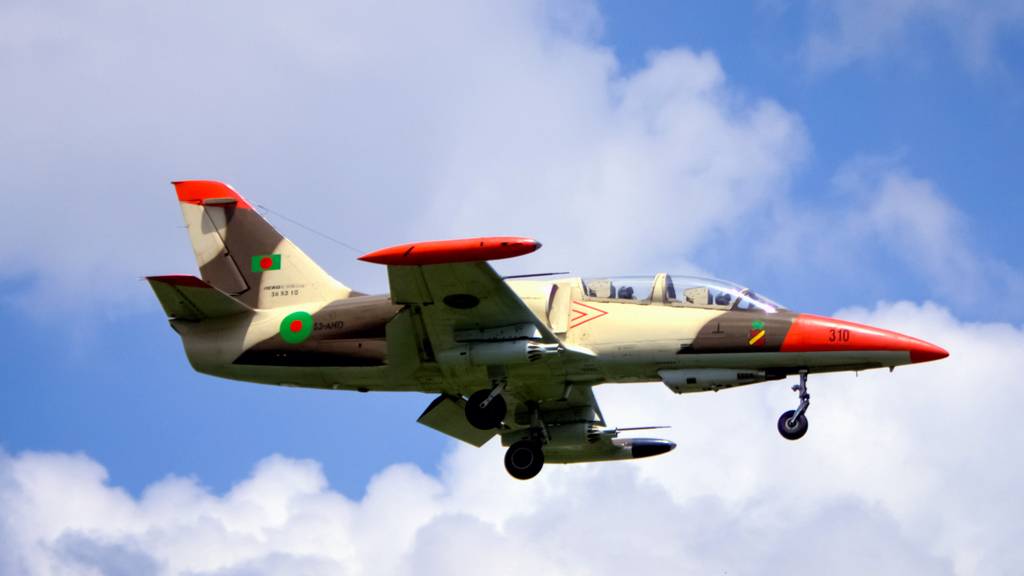
Bangladesh Air Force L-39ZA in 2018

==== Bangladesh ====
Bangladesh Air Force

- 8 L-39ZA acquired in late 1990s. One was lost in a crash in 2012 killing a pilot. Replaced by K-8W Karakorum.

==== Cambodia ====
Royal Cambodian Air Force

- Formerly operated 6 L-39C trainer aircraft
- Recently ordered 4 L-39NG trainer aircraft

==== Chad ====
Military of Chad

- Operated 11 L-39ZO aircraft.

==== Republic of the Congo ====
Congolese Air Force

==== Czech Republic ====
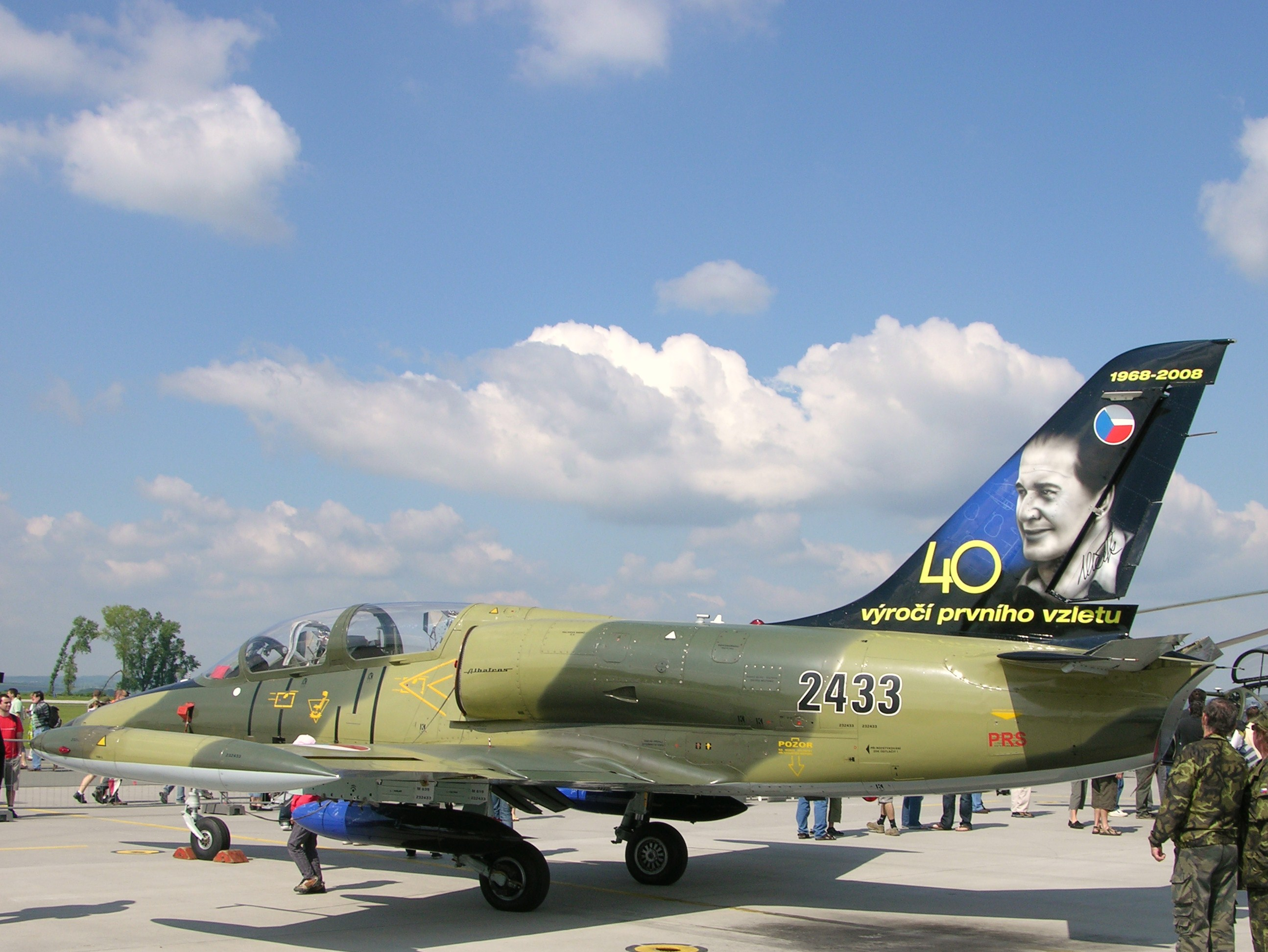
a Czech Aero L-39

Czech Air Force

- L-39C
- L-39ZA
- L-39V
- L-39MS

==== Czechoslovakia ====
Czechoslovak Air Force

- 33x L-39C
- 6x L-39MS
- 8x L-39V
- 30x L-39ZA

Two Czechoslovak AF L-39Vs were delivered to the East German Air Force.

All Czechoslovak Air Force aircraft passed to successor states – Czech Republic and Slovakia.

==== East Germany ====
East German Air Force

- 52x L-39ZO
- 2x L-39V
- Two former Czechoslovak L-39Vs delivered to the East German Air Force.
- Twenty former East German L-39ZO delivered to Hungary.

==== Ghana ====
Ghana Air Force

- 2 L-39ZO

==== Hungary ====
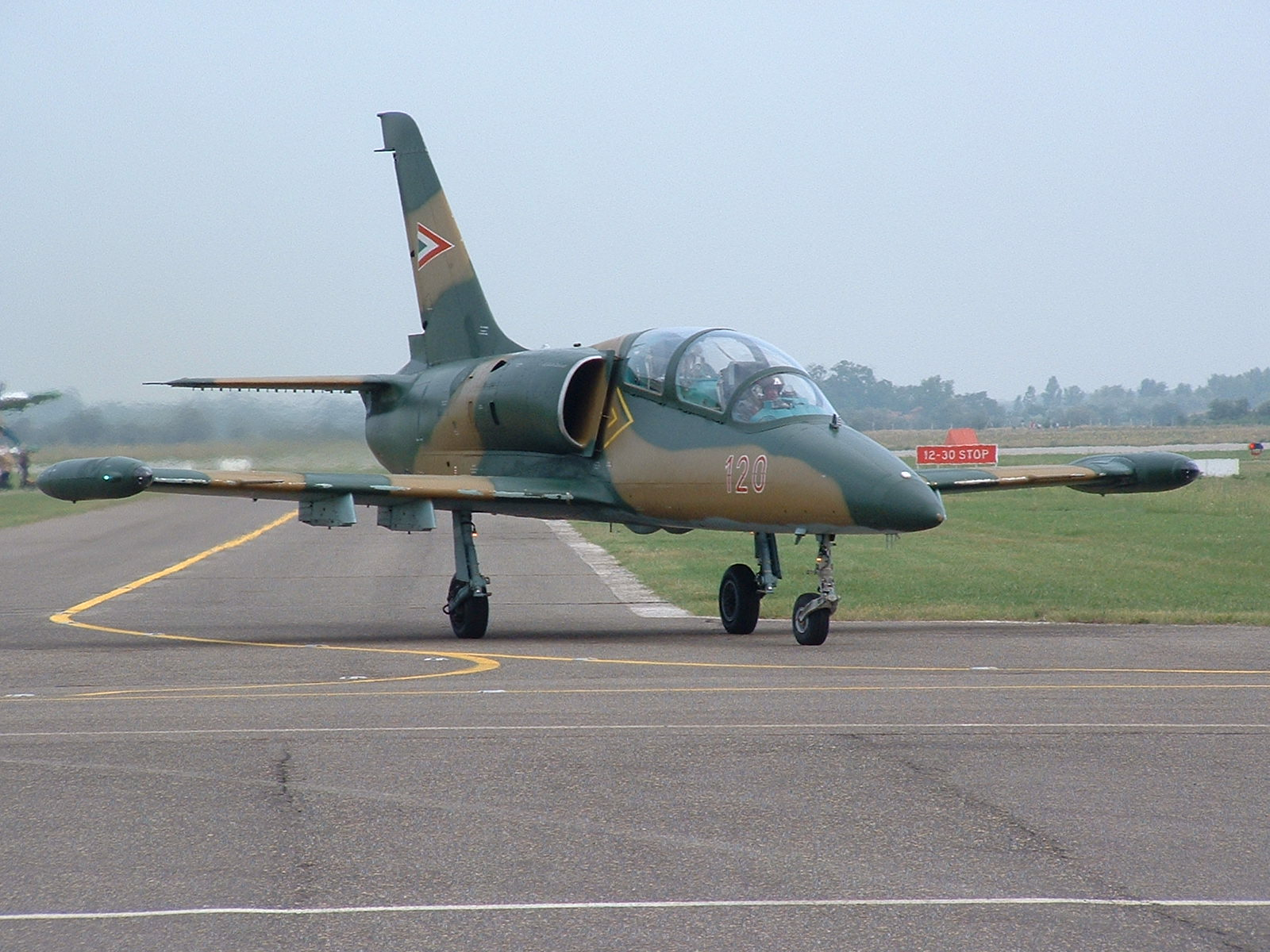
Hungarian Aero L-39 Albatros

Hungarian Air Force

- 20x L-39ZO
- Twenty former East German L-39ZO delivered to Hungary

==== Ichkeria ====
Armed Forces of the Chechen Republic of Ichkeria

==== Iraq ====
Iraqi Air Force

- 22x L-39C
- 59x L-39ZO

==== Kyrgyzstan ====
Kyrgyzstan Air Force

- 4x (24 in store) L-39C

==== Lithuania ====
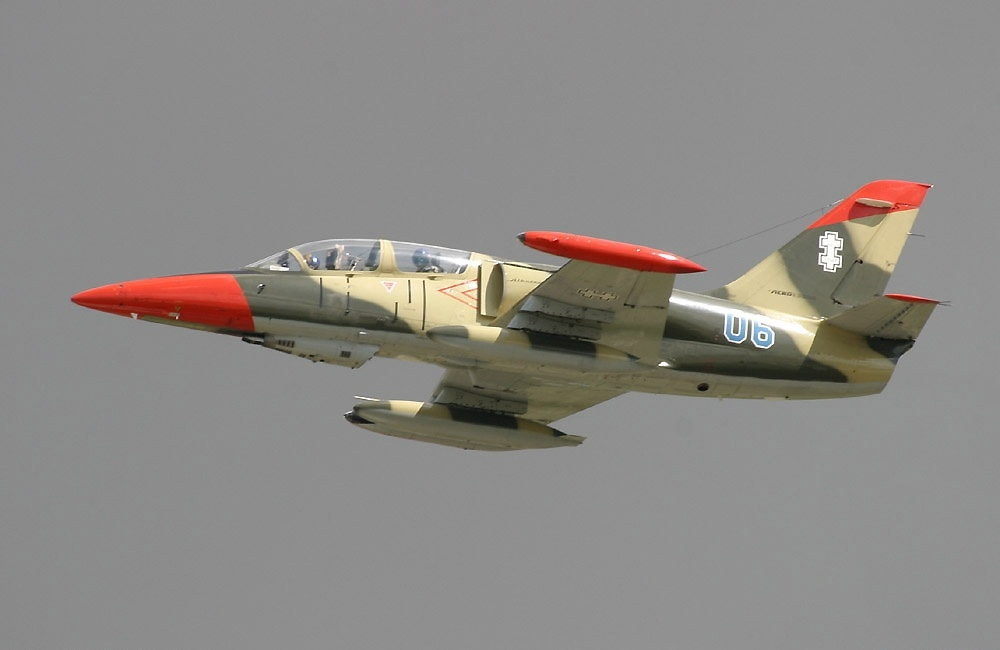
Lithuania Aero L-39 Albatros.

Lithuanian Air Force

- 1x L-39ZA

==== Romania ====
Romanian Air Force

- 32x L-39ZA

==== South Sudan ====
South Sudan Air Force

- Unknown number of L-39 jets with logistical and maintenance support from Uganda

==== Soviet Union ====
DOSAAF
Soviet Air Force

- 2080x L-39C

All Soviet Air Force aircraft passed to successor states: Azerbaijan, the Chechen Republic of Ichkeria, Kazakhstan, Kyrgyzstan, Lithuania, Russia, Ukraine and Uzbekistan.

==== Syria ====
Syrian Air Force

- 55 L-39ZO and 44 L-39ZA bought from Czechoslovakia in the 1970s and 1980s.
- 61 aircraft as of December 2020.

The Syrian government of Al-Assad fell to rebels in late 2024, and the Syrian Arab Air Force was dismantled. It was re-established as Syrian Air Force, but the revolution, and the Israeli air strikes that followed it, wrecked havoc in the inventory of the Air Force. In late 2025, the World Air Forces publication by FlightGlobal, which tracks the aircraft inventories of world's air forces and publishes its counts annually, removed all Syrian Air Force's aircraft from their World Air Forces 2026 report. It is thus questionable if the Syrian Air Force has any flying aircraft in their inventory, and in particular, any L-39, as of December 2025.

==== Thailand ====
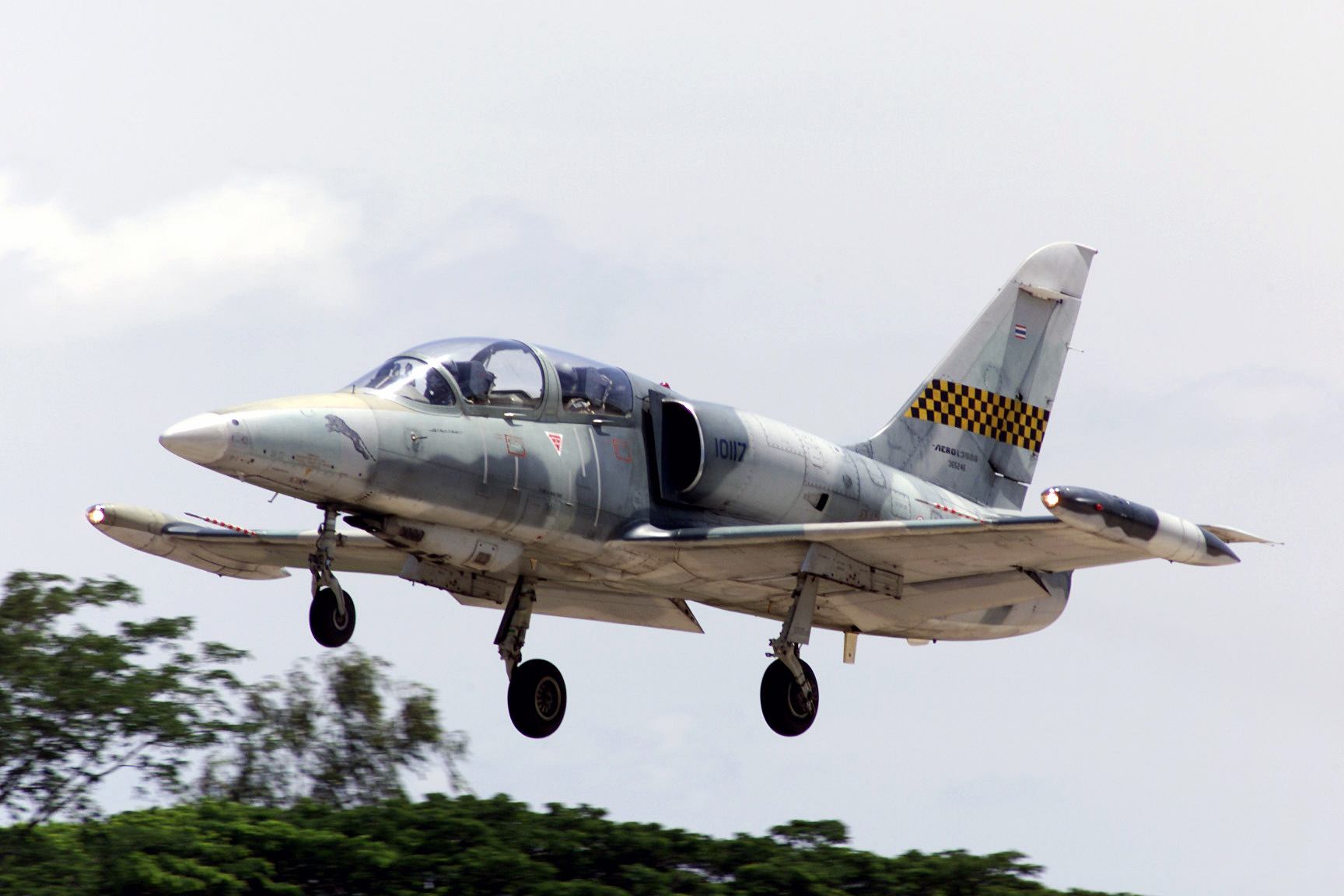
A Royal Thai Air Force L-39ZA/ART Albatros.

Royal Thai Air Force

- 37 L-30ZA/ART in commissioned from 1994 to 2021.

==== Turkmenistan ====
Turkmenistan Air Force

- 2 aircraft.

== Civil operators ==
=== Australia ===
A small number of L-39s are flown in Australia as jet flight experiences for paying public.

=== Canada ===
International Test Pilots School

Northern Lights Aerobatics Team from Montreal used 2 L-39C in 2000, but ceased operating them and performing airshows after 2000. The aircraft were registered and based in the US with Northern Lights USA of Lafayette, LA with 1 lost in crash in 2001.

=== France ===
Breitling Jet Team

A civilian aerobatic display team based in Dijon, France; operating seven L-39 Albatros jets in the colours of their sponsor, Breitling.

Babcock has acquired this fleet in the establishment of their international fighter pilot training academy.

TopGun Voltige

This company based in La Roche-sur-Yon operates 2 L-39 Albatros jets for touristic flights.

=== New Zealand ===
Fighter Jets NZ operate 3 L-39 from Tauranga, NZ for jet flight experiences and also do airshow displays around the country.

=== Soviet Union ===
DOSAAF

DOSAAF paramilitary organization, tasked with the training and preparation of reserves for the Soviet armed forces, operated unknown number of L-39.

=== United States ===
Hundreds of L-39s are finding new homes with private owners all over the world, especially in the United States.

== See also ==
- Aero L-39 Albatros
