= Ernest Frédéric Schneider =

Swiss entrepreneur in watch-industry

Ernest Frédéric Schneider (15 April 1921 – 5 May 2015) was a Swiss entrepreneur and watch-industry executive. He managed the Swiss watch company Sicura and acquired the rights to the Breitling and Navitimer names in 1979.

== Early life and background ==
Ernest Frédéric Schneider was born in Fribourg, Switzerland, on 15 April 1921, the fourth of five children.

He served in the Swiss Armed Forces in the early 1940s, initially in the Fribourg Signal Corps in 1941, before joining the 7th Infantry Regiment. During World War II, he was assigned to the Swiss Federal Arms Factory (Fabrique fédérale d'armes) in Bern. He was later promoted to major in 1959, commanded the 15th Fusilier Battalion, and became a member of the general staff of the 10th Fortress Brigade.

== Career ==
In the early 1960s, following the death of his father-in-law, Théodore Sfaellos, Schneider took over the management of the Sicura watch company, based in Granges in the canton of Valais. A company brochure from the mid-1970s mentioned four assembly plants, a case factory, and a jewelry factory.

During the 1970s, Sicura produced both electronic and quartz watches, including some described as "Stunt Watches," and later introduced LCD display and solarpowered quartz watches.

On 5 April 1979, Schneider and Willy Breitling signed an agreement for the rights to the Breitling and Navitimer names.

In 1980, he acquired the watch company Kelek, based in La Chaux-de-Fonds, which specialized in complications and was later incorporated into Breitling.

During Schneider's tenure, Breitling introduced several new watch models, including the Chronomat (1984), the Aerospace (1985), and the Emergency (1995).

== Later years and death ==
Schneider died on 5 May 2015. Following his death, his son Theodore Schneider assumed the leadership at Breitling.
