= Breitling Colt =

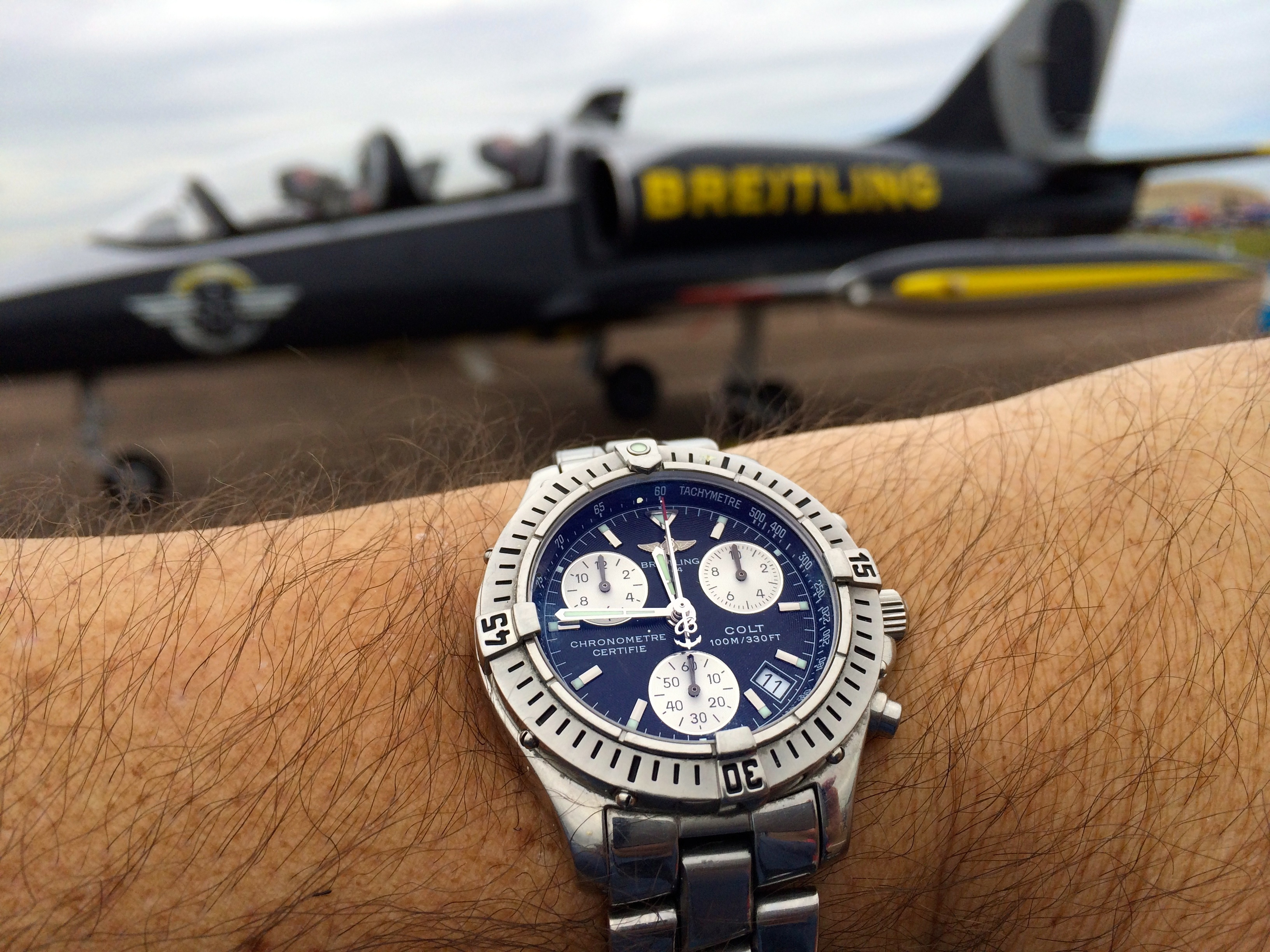
Breitling is well-known in the aviation industry

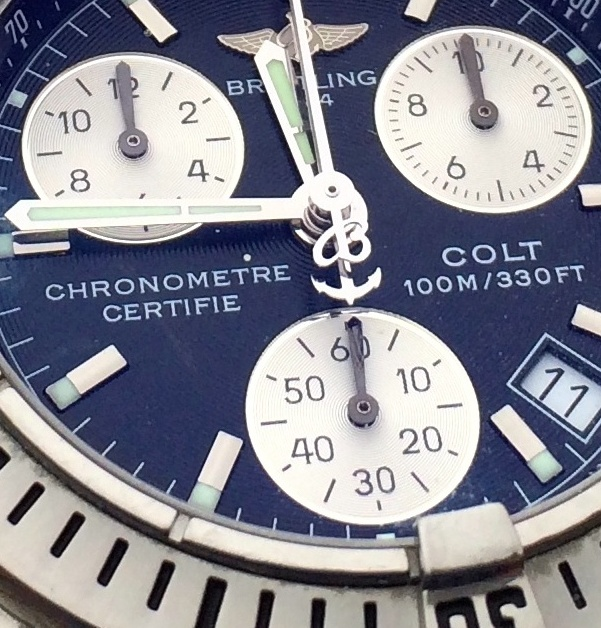
Breitling Colt chronograph details

Breitling Colt is an entry-level luxury timepiece from Swiss watch company Breitling SA. The Colt has a stainless steel case with a set of four bezel rider tabs, which are a Breitling signature design detail first used on the Breitling Chronomat in 1984. Similar to the Chronomat and the Navitimer, the Colt was originally designed as a military watch, emphasizing reliability and legibility.

Breitling Colt models are powered by COSC-certified automatic movements or high-precision quartz calibers. The Chronomat Colt Automatic 41 uses the ETA 2824-based Breitling 17 movement. The Colt Chronograph Automatic uses the caliber B13, which is a COSC-certified version of the ETA 7750.

The Breitling Colt Skyracer uses Breitlight, a material said to be three times lighter than titanium and significantly more scratch-resistant than stainless steel.

Breitling ceased production of the Colt in 2020. Hodinkee reported that the Colt “blended a sort of military appeal with the basic philosophy of a dive watch.”
