= Léon Breitling =

Swiss watchmaker and businessman

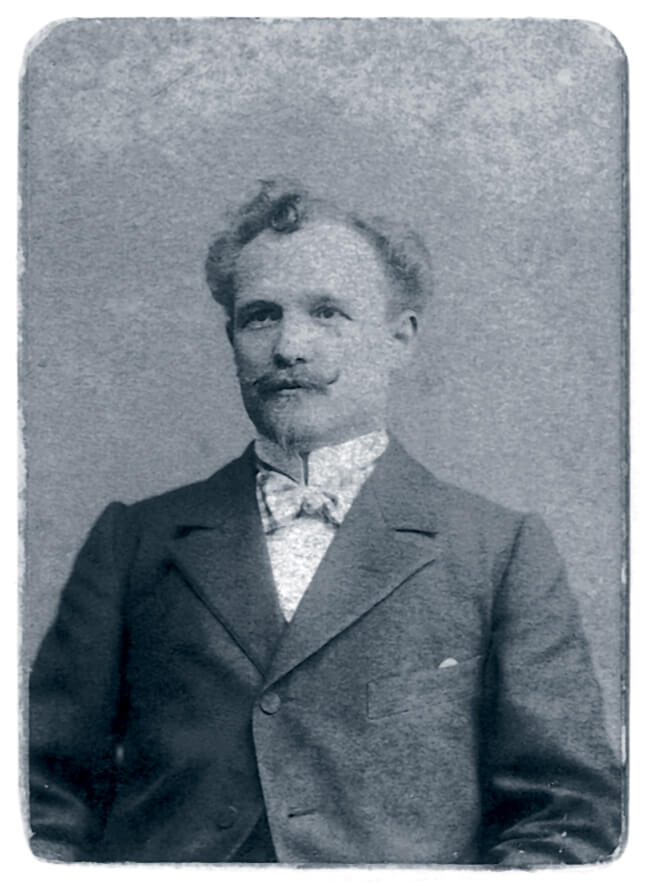
- Born: 27 January 1860; Saint-Imier, Switzerland
- Died: 11 August 1914 (aged 54); La Chaux-de Fonds, Switzerland
- Citizenship: Swiss
- Occupation: Watchmaker
- Years active: 1884–1914
- Organization: Breitling SA

Léon Breitling (27 January 1860 – 11 August 1914) was a Swiss watchmaker and a businessman, who founded the watch manufacturing company Breitling SA in Saint-Imier in 1884.

== Career overview ==
Léon Breitling was born in 1860. His interest in watchmaking started at a very young age. He had his first internship as a teenager.

In 1884, at age 24, he established his first business venture, the watchmaking company G Leon Breitling in Saint-Imier (Bernese Jura). He founded his manufacture, producing complicated watches, chronographs and chronometric instruments.

In 1892, Breitling moved his company to La Chaux-de-Fonds to larger production facilities, renaming the brand the Leon G. Breitling Montbrillant SA Watch Factory. The business eventually grew to 60 employees.

== Accomplishments ==
Breitling built one of the most famous Swiss watch companies in history, both in popular acclaim and annual revenues.

Breitling remained privately owned, and its management was kept within the Breitling family until 1979.

Ernst Schneider bought the company from the Breitling family in 1979. His family retained ownership until April 2017.

Ernst's son, Theodore Schneider, sold the majority stake (80%) in Breitling to CVC Capital Partners for over $870m. Theodore retained 20% control of Breitling until November 2018, when he sold these remaining 20% to CVC.

== Personal life ==
Breitling was born in 1860. He died in 1914 in Switzerland.

He married and had one child, Gaston Breitling, to whom he passed his company, Breitling.

== Books ==
- Breitling Highlights - Henning Mützlitz, 2011, ISBN 3868521976, ISBN 9783868521979
- Breitling: The History of a Great Brand of Watches (1884 – present), ISBN 9780764326707
- Breitling. Die Geschichte einer großen Uhrenmarke. 1884 bis heute - Benno Richter, ISBN 3766711350
- Das ZEITGEFÜHL-Uhrenbuch - Gerd-Lothar Reschke, ISBN 3938607610
