= Breitling Top Time =

Breitling Top Time is a COSC-certified chronograph introduced in 1964 by Swiss watch brand Breitling SA.

The most recent version of the watch is produced with an in-house Breitling movement.

== In popular culture ==
The watch appeared in the 1965 James Bond movie Thunderball: Bond is given a Breitling Top Time with a watchcase large enough containing a built-in geiger counter to track down two stolen nuclear warheads. After the movie was filmed, the watch disappeared and later resurfaced in a car boot sale in England in 2012, where it was purchased for £25. It later sold at Christie's auction house for over £100,000. In the same film, the SPECTRE pilot who hijacks the Vulcan bomber wears a Breitling Navitimer.
