= Breitling Superocean =

Collection of luxury dive watches

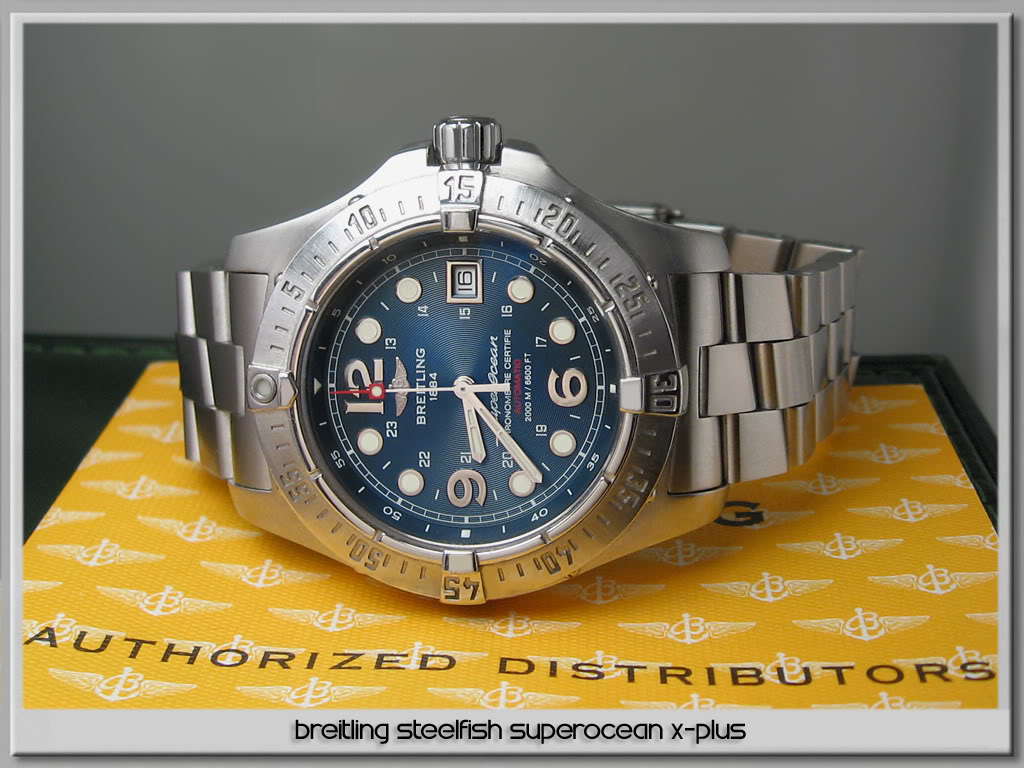
The Breitling Superocean has a stainless steel case and bracelet.

Breitling Superocean is a collection of luxury dive watches manufactured by independent watchmaker Breitling SA. The first SuperOcean was introduced in 1957, and had water resistance of 200m, while later models have 1,000m to 2,000m of water resistance.
