= Breitling Chronomat =

Swiss watch

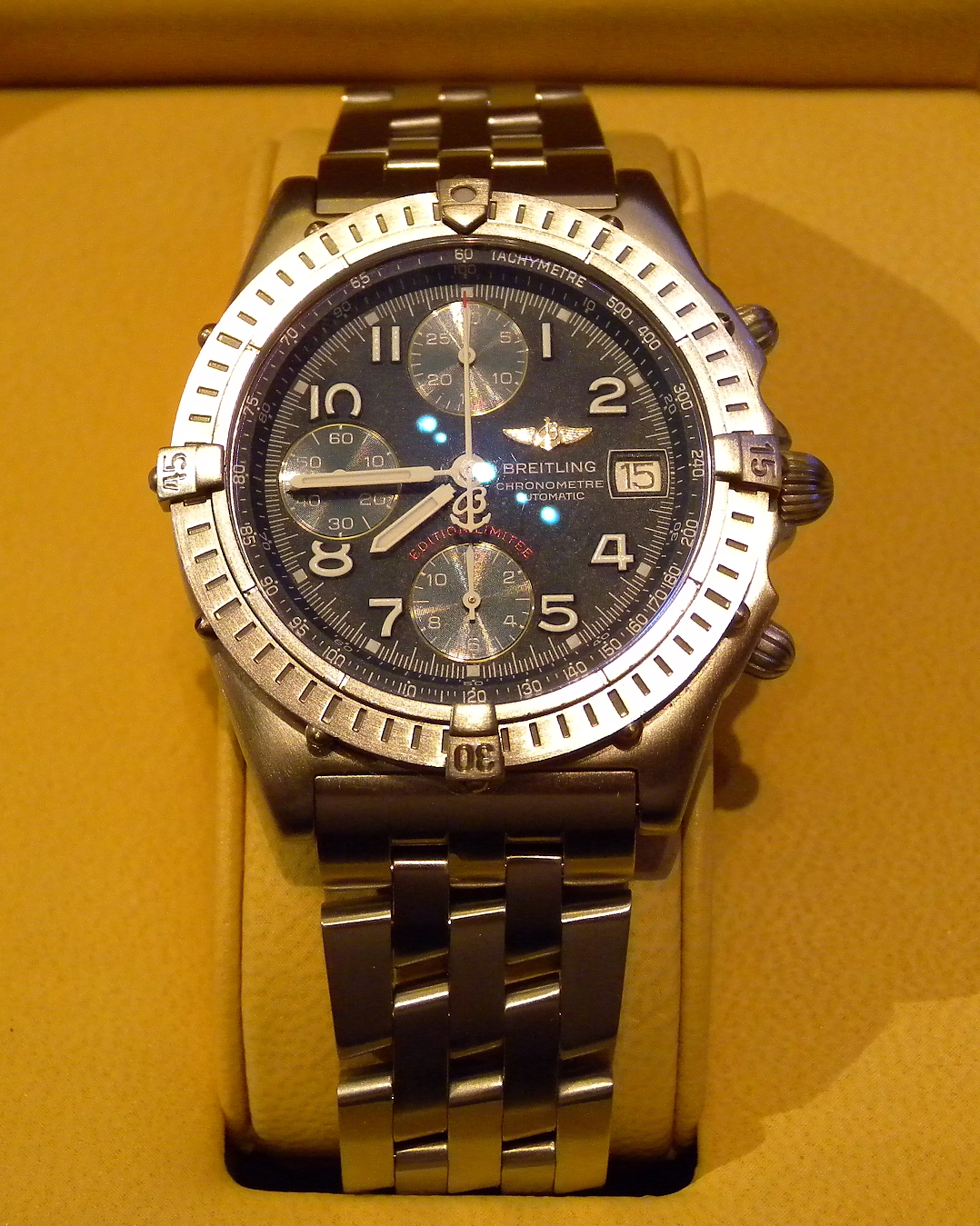
Breitling Chronomat Blackbird

The Breitling Chronomat was initially released in 1941 in Switzerland by Breitling SA. Since then it has been one of the best selling watches produced by Breitling. Its set of four bezel rider tabs became a Breitling signature design detail, seen as well in the Breitling Colt. Chronomat is a trademark and collection line first released in 1942, and is one of the company's best-selling models.

== History ==
The first Chronomat had a circular slide rule and its design followed the tension of the era for military watches. The movement of the first Chronomat was the Venus 175 with 17 jewels, a manual wind movement.

The Chronomat was a patented design introduced in 1940 by Willy Breitling and the world's first two-pusher chronograph wristwatch.

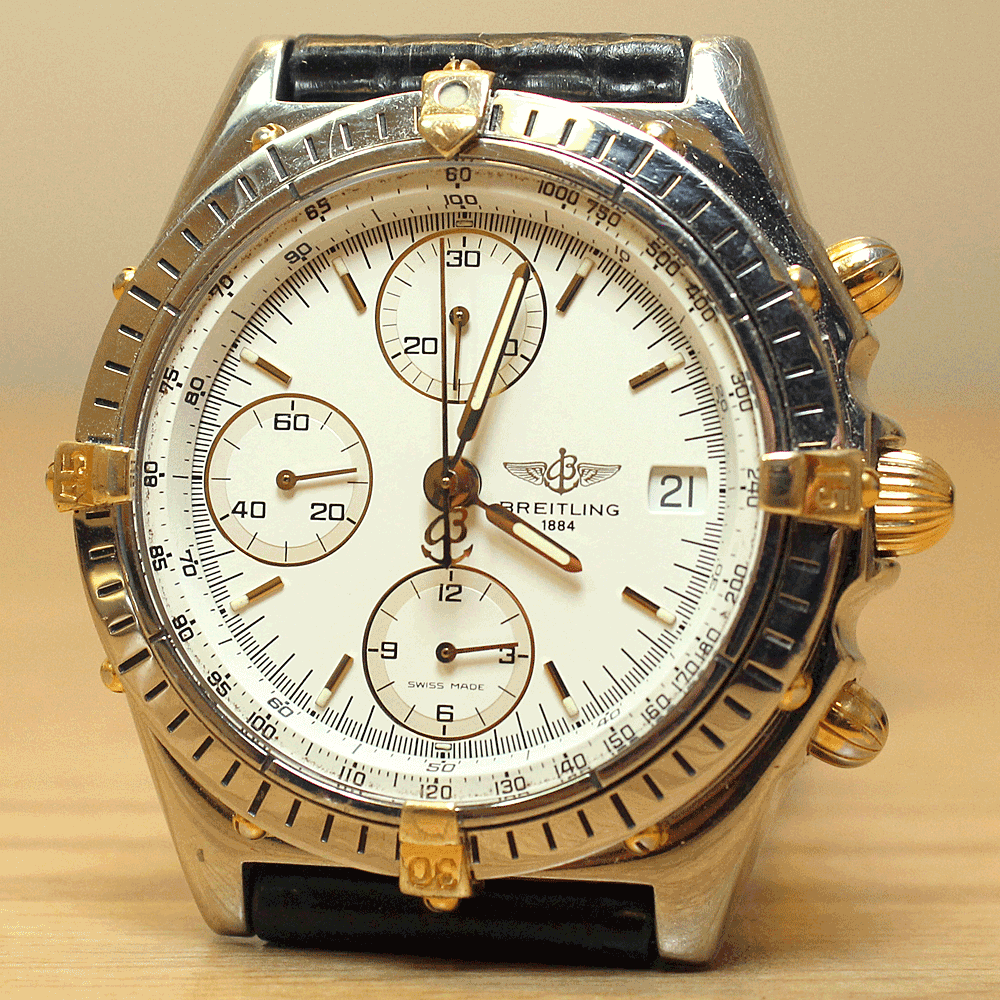
Breitling Chronomat ref. B13050

The first model of the Chronomat collection had a circular slide rule and its design followed the appeal and design cues of the era for military watches. The movement of the first Chronomat was the Venus 175 with 17 jewels, a manual winding movement.

The current Chronomat was released in 2009, and was the first watch produced entirely by Breitling, featuring the in-house B01 caliber. The B01 movement has a 70-hour power reserve and COSC certification.

In the 1990s the two-tone, steel-and-yellow-gold model with a dark blue dial and Rouleaux bracelet was worn by Jerry Seinfeld. The Rouleaux bracelet was discontinued for several years and re-introduced in 2020 in the Chronomat B01 42.

The current Chronomat was released in 2009 and was the first watch produced entirely by Breitling, featuring the in-house B01 caliber. The previous model had a Valjoux 7750 movement. The B01 movement has a 70-hour power reserve and COSC certification.

== In popular culture ==
Adam Sandler as diamond district merchant Howard Ratner wears a large Breitling Chronomat with gilt numbering on the bezel in Uncut Gems (2019).
