= Gaston Breitling =

Swiss watchmaker and businessman

- Born: 1884; Saint-Imier, Switzerland
- Died: 30 July 1927 (aged 42–43)
- Citizenship: Swiss
- Occupation: Watchmaker
- Organization: Breitling SA

Gaston Breitling was a Swiss watchmaker, businessman, and president of the Swiss manufacturing company Breitling SA between 1914 and 1927.

He is credited with the invention of the first wristwatch chronograph in 1915.

== Accomplishments ==
In 1915, after taking over the helm of the Breitling company, Gaston Breitling produced the world's first chronograph with a central second hand and 30-minute counter.

== Personal life ==
Breitling had one child, Willy Breitling (1913–1979).

He died on 30 July 1927.

== Books ==
- Breitling Highlights - Henning Mützlitz, 2011, ISBN 3868521976, ISBN 9783868521979
- Breitling: The History of a Great Brand of Watches (1884 – present), ISBN 9780764326707
- Breitling. Die Geschichte einer großen Uhrenmarke. 1884 bis heute - Benno Richter, ISBN 3766711350
- Das ZEITGEFÜHL-Uhrenbuch - Gerd-Lothar Reschke, ISBN 3938607610
