= Breitling Navitimer =

Watch by Breitling SA

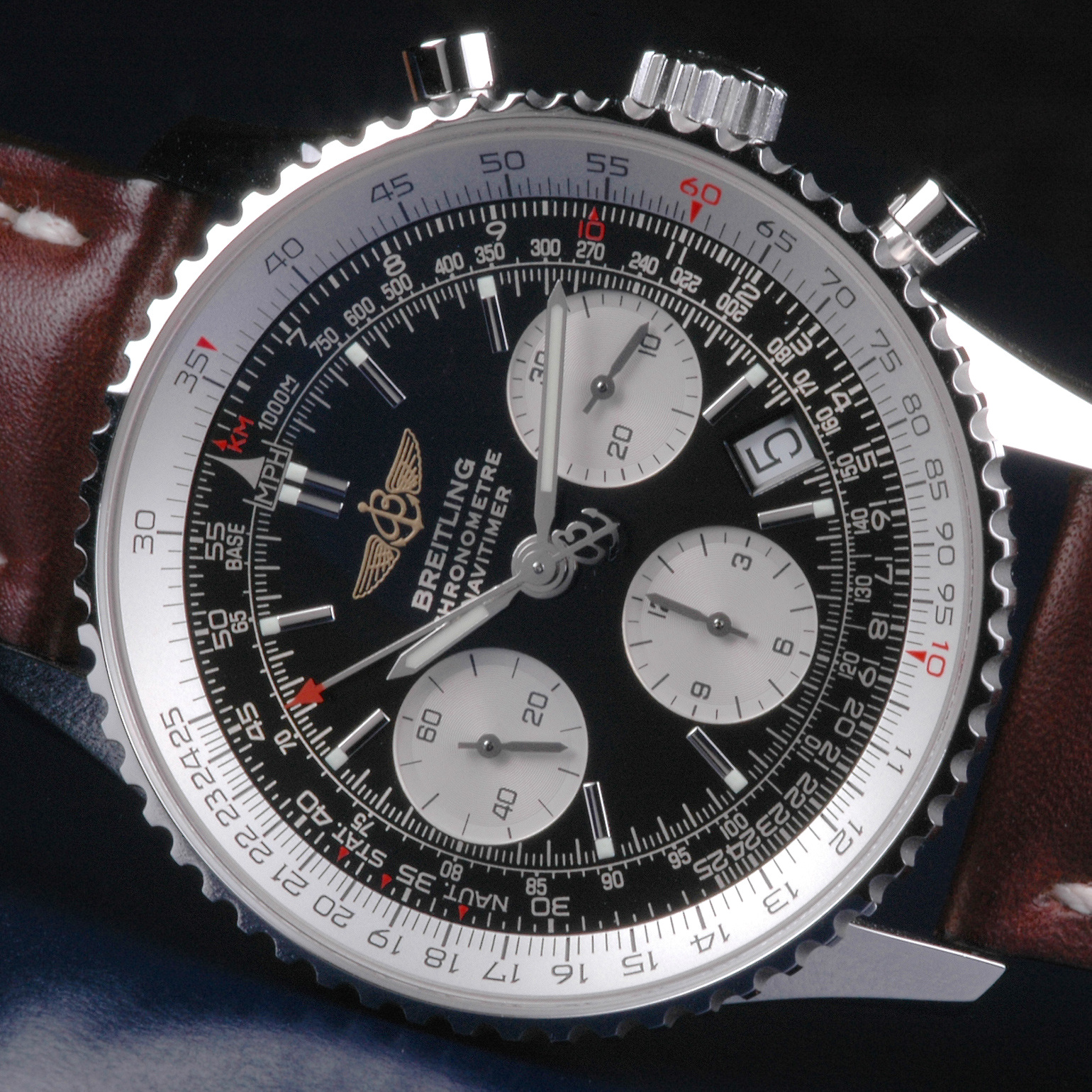
- The Breitling Navitimer ref. A23322, produced from 2003 until 2011.
- Manufacturer: Breitling SA
- Type: Automatic
- Display: Analogue
- Introduced: 1954

The Breitling Navitimer is a watch that was released in 1954 in Switzerland by Breitling SA. Since then it has been one of the best selling watches produced by Breitling.

== History ==
In 1941, Breitling patented an innovative circular slide-rule chronograph, easily handling tachymeter, telemeter, pulsometer, and various mathematical operations. The 1942 watch that resulted, named “Chronomat”,stood for Chronograph for Mathematician, and allowed to perform calculations directly on the watch.This bezel became most associated with the Navitimer. In response to a request from the Aircraft Owners and Pilots Association, Breitling produced the Navitimer in 1954. Initially only available to members of the AOPA and produced with their logo on the dial, the Navitimer was later made publicly available with the 'winged B' Breitling logo in 1956.

The name Navitimer comes from two words were used to describe its purpose: Navigation and Timer.

The first automatic Navitimer chronograph was introduced to the public in 1969; its movement was co-developed by Breitling, Dubois-Depraz, Heuer, and Hamilton. It was a secret consortium project called “Project 99” led by Breitling.

=== Sinn 903 ===
Facing financial difficulties, Breitling licensed Navitimer the design to Sinn in 1979. Although Sinn are not permitted to use the Navitimer name, they continue to produce the Sinn 903 which uses the same design as the Navitimer.

== Variants ==
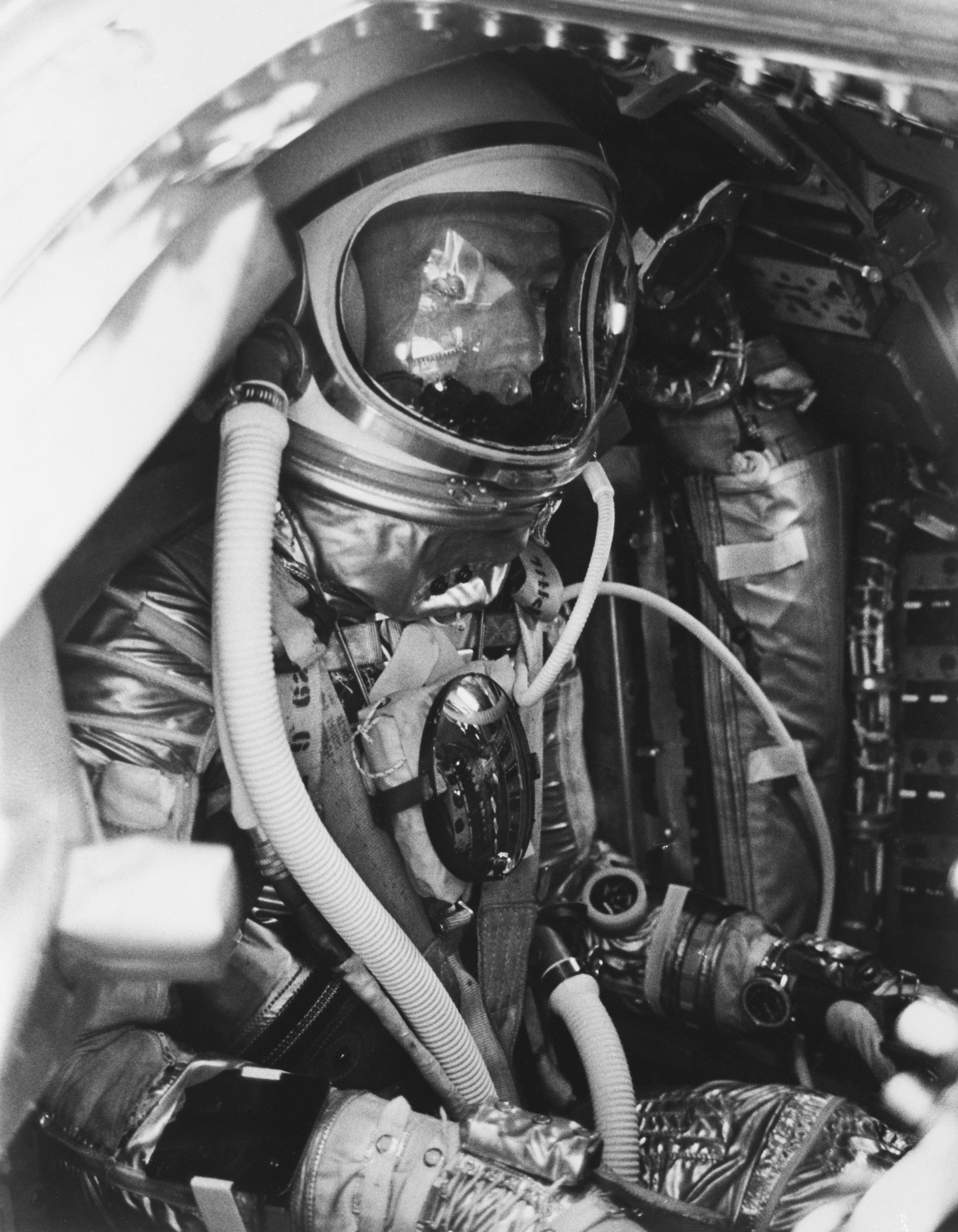
NASA Project Mercury Astronaut Scott Carpenter, pilot of the Mercury Atlas 7 mission, inside his Aurora 7 spacecraft before the launch of the mission on May 24, 1962, wearing the Cosmonaute Navitimer

In 1961, Scott Carpenter, one of the original astronauts in the Mercury space program, tasked Breitling with incorporating a 24-hour dial instead of the normal 12-hour dial, due to lack of day and night in space travel. Breitling produced the 24-hour Navitimer, which Carpenter wore on his 1962 space flight. Breitling proceeded to produce a commercial version of the 24-hour version, the Cosmonaute Navitimer, with both Breitling and AOPA logos.

== Notable wearers ==
The Breitling Navitimer has been worn by several influential individuals in the world of aerospace and beyond, including astronaut Scott Carpenter, jazz musician Miles Davis, and comedian Jerry Seinfeld.

== See also ==
- Breitling Jet Team
- Pilot watch
