= Breitling SA =

Swiss luxury watchmaker

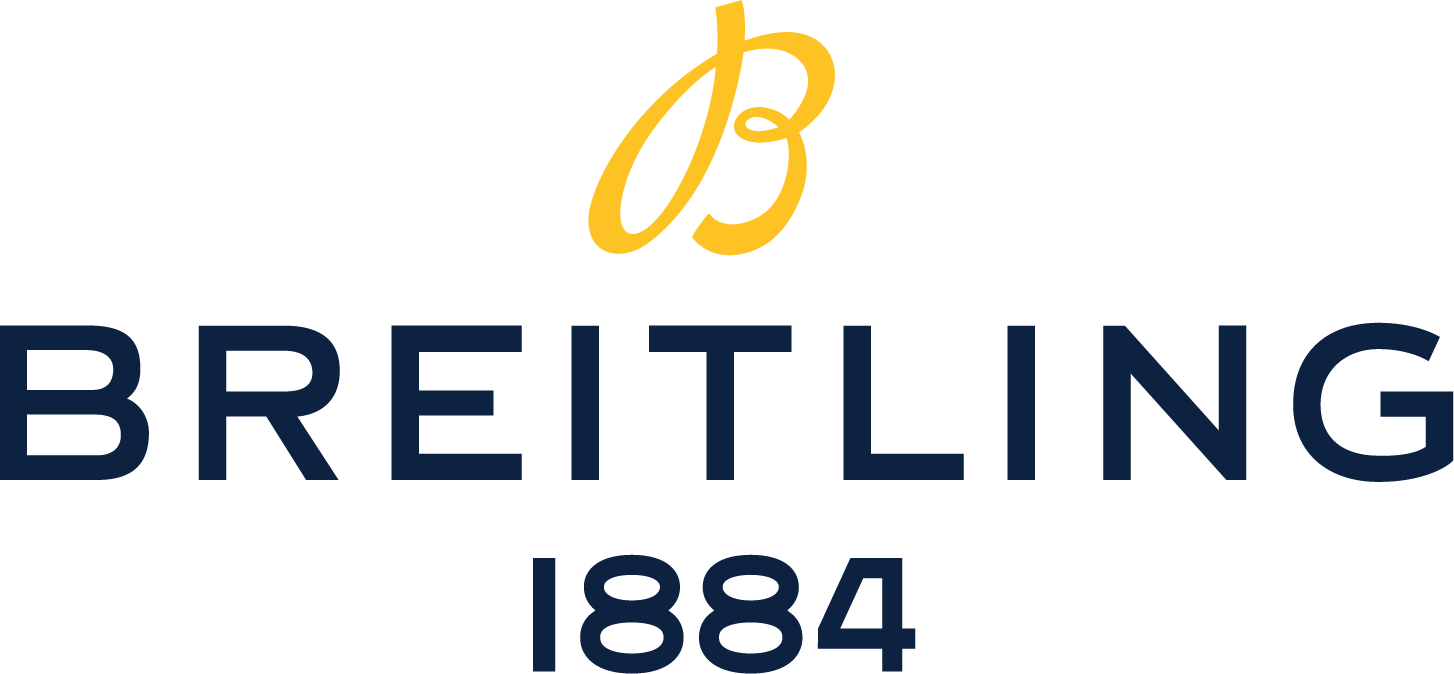
- Type: Private
- Industry: Watch manufacturing
- Founded: 1884, in Saint-Imier, Switzerland
- Founder: Léon Breitling
- Headquarters: Grenchen, Switzerland
- Key people: Satpal Dhaliwal (CEO)
- Products: Wristwatches
- Owner: Partners Group
- Website: www.breitling.com

Breitling SA (German pronunciation: [ˈbraɪtlɪŋ]) is a Swiss luxury watchmaker founded in 1884 in Saint-Imier, Switzerland, by Léon Breitling. Breitling's HQ is based in Grenchen, and their production is based in La Chaux-de-Fonds, Switzerland.

Since 2022 the company is owned by Partners Group, a publicly traded private equity firm. In 2023, Breitling made its first major acquisition, buying Universal Genève. In 2025, Breitling acquired Gallet.

== History ==
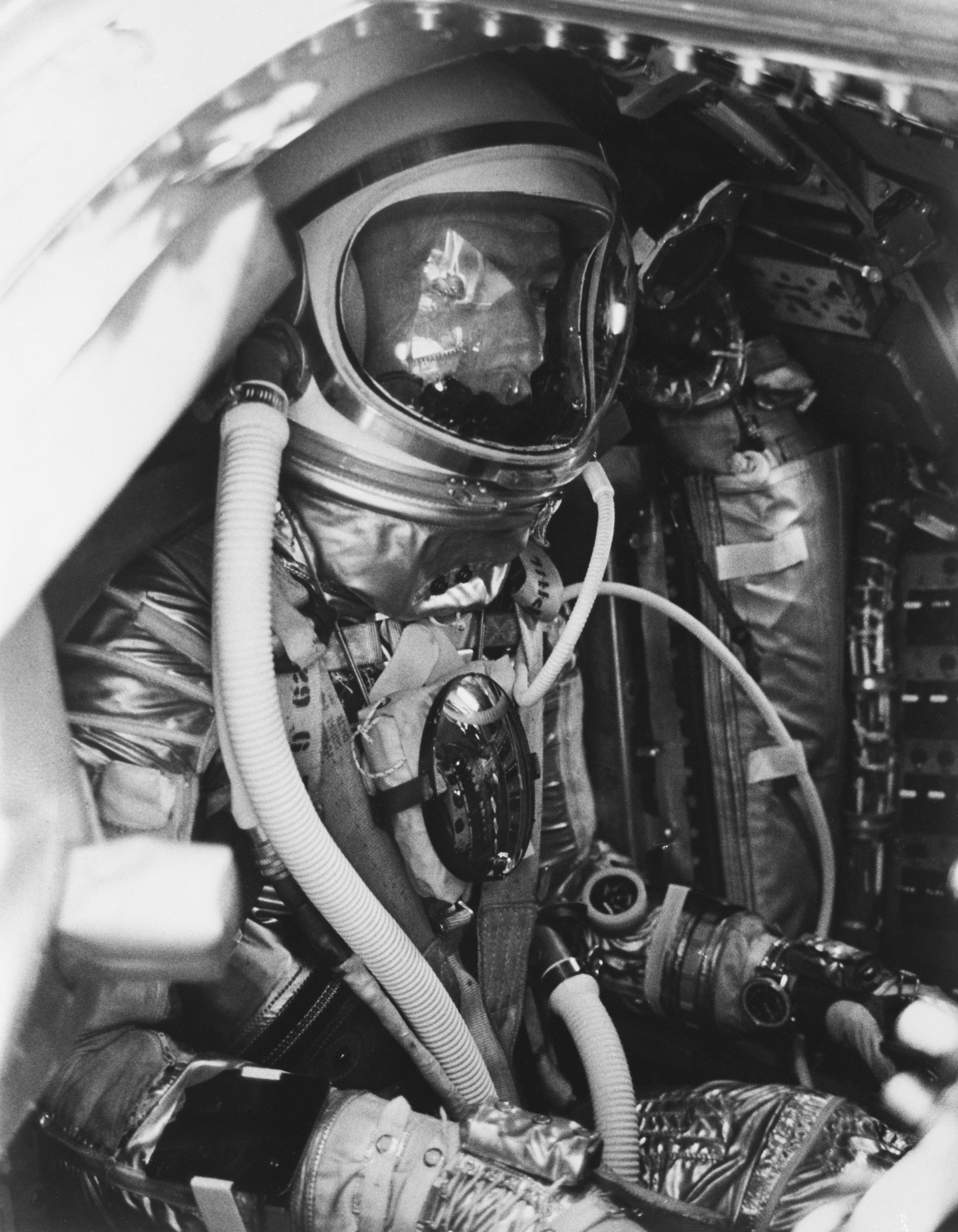
Astronaut Scott Carpenter wearing a Breitling Cosmonaute inside the Aurora 7 spacecraft, 24 May 1962

Breitling SA was founded in Saint-Imier by Léon Breitling in 1884. When he died in 1914, the business passed to his son, Gaston, and then to his grandson, Willy, in 1935. Willy's children, however, were not interested in pursuing the family business, so the Breitling factory in La Chaux de Fonds closed in December 1978. Willy, already in poor health, died in May 1979.

Ernest Schneider bought the Breitling name from the founding family in 1979. Schneider was owner of the Sicura in Grenchen. Production of Breitling watches moved to the Sicura factory, which later changed its name to Montres Breitling AG and then to Breitling AG in 1994.

The Schneider family retained ownership until April 2017, when Ernst's son, Theodore Schneider, sold the majority stake (80%) in Breitling to CVC Capital Partners for $870 million. Schneider retained 20% control of Breitling until November 2018, when he sold these remaining 20% to CVC.

On 23 December 2022, Partners Group, a Swiss investment and private equity firm, took over the majority of the Breitling shares from CVC. Co-founder of Partners Group, Alfred Gantner, took over the presidency of Breitling's directorial board.

== Products ==
The company's mechanical or quartz movements are chronometer certified by the COSC and are usually marketed towards either diving (SuperOcean) or aviation (Navitimer). Aviation models offer aviation functions largely as novelty complications, since such functionality has largely been replaced by modern electronic instruments and electronic flight bags (EFBs). The styling of Breitling watches consists of polished cases, bracelets, and large watch faces for improved readability. Many models have an automatic winding mechanism with complications.

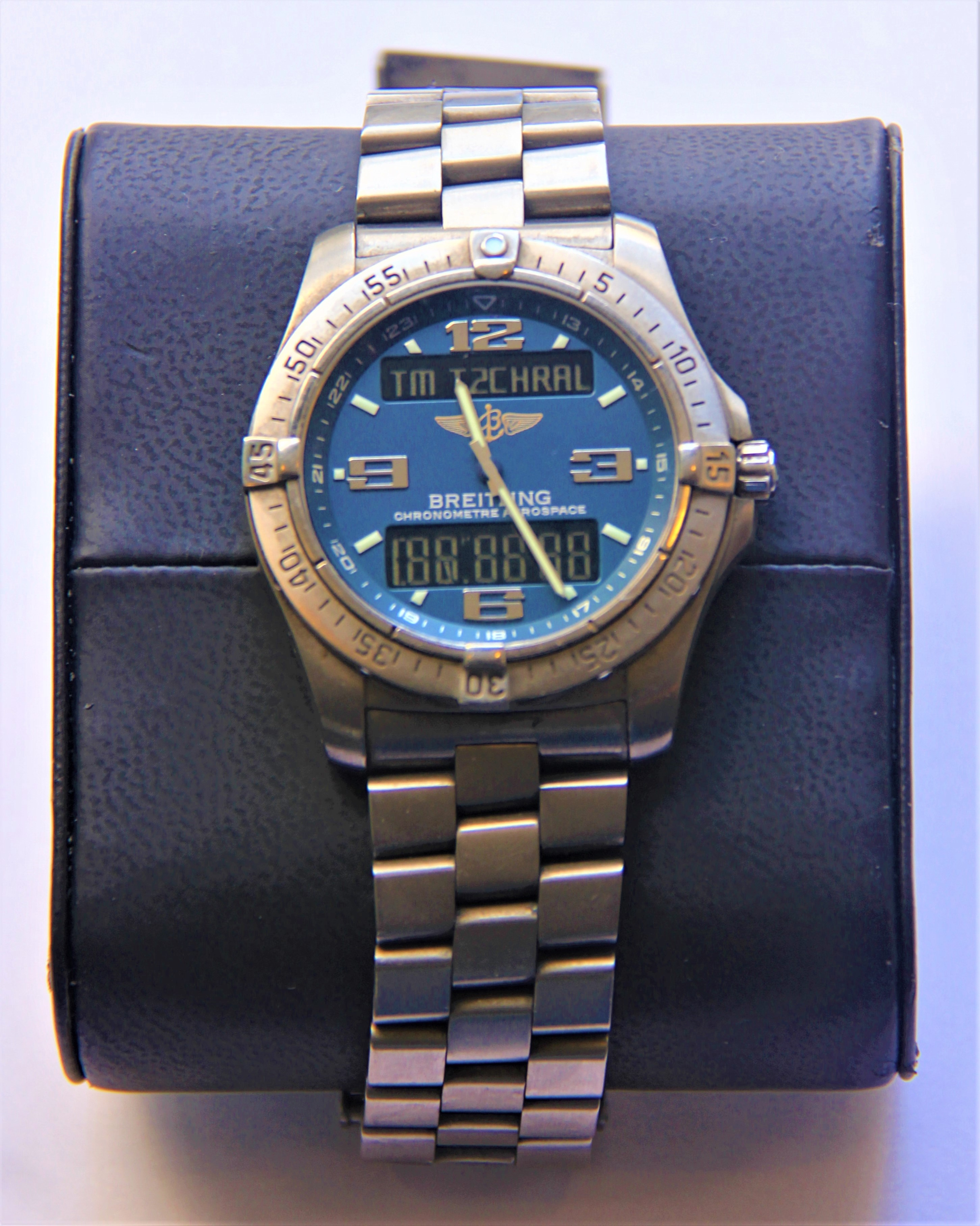
Breitling Aerospace Avantage with titanium case

Breitling offers logo customization for pilots with group orders. By the 1990s, the use of logos for military aviation customers expanded to include various unit logos on the Aerospace and Chronospace Auto models, primarily those of squadrons, usually part of a group purchase by pilots and navigators/flight officers of the particular unit.

Historically, Breitling has sourced movements from suppliers such as Valjoux, ETA, and Venus rather than producing movements in-house; however, in 2009 Breitling developed the B01, a self-winding, column wheel chronograph movement, for use in the Breitling Chronomat 01 and Navitimer 01.

=== Navitimer ===
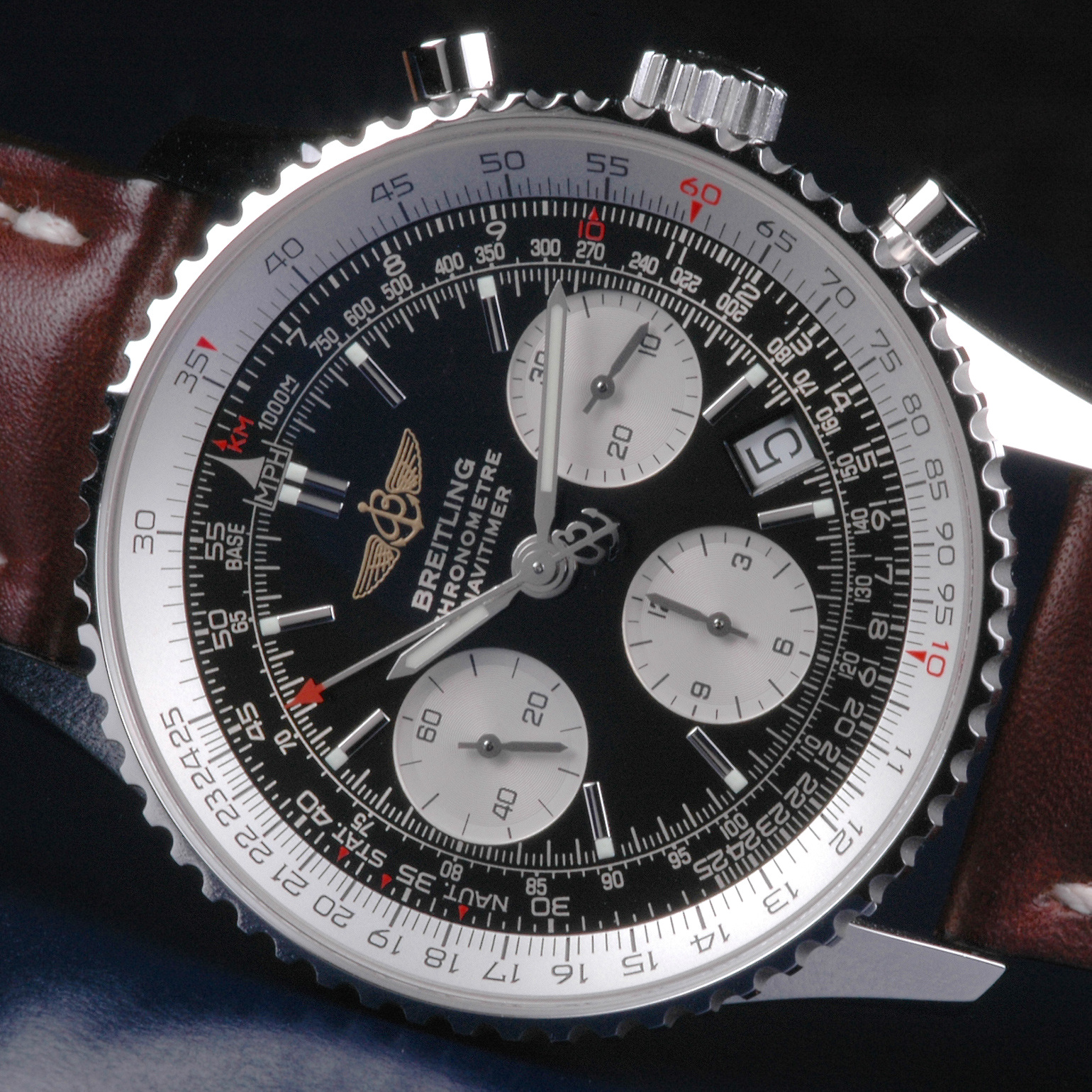
Breitling Navitimer

In the 1940s, Breitling added a circular slide rule to the bezel of its Chronomat models. This bezel became most associated with the Navitimer, launched in 1954. The name Navitimer comes from two words were used to describe its purpose: Navigation and Timer. During the 1950s and 1960s, a version of the Navitimer was offered by the Aircraft Owners and Pilots Association with the AOPA logo on the dial.

In 1961, Scott Carpenter, one of the original astronauts in the Mercury space program, tasked Breitling with incorporating a 24-hour dial instead of the normal 12-hour dial, due to lack of day and night in space travel. Breitling produced the 24-hour Navitimer, which Carpenter wore on his 1962 space flight. Breitling proceeded to produce a commercial version of the 24-hour version, the Cosmonaute Navitimer, with both Breitling and AOPA logos.

The first automatic Navitimer chronograph was introduced to the public in 1969; its movement was co-developed by Breitling, Dubois-Depraz, Heuer, and Hamilton.

=== Chronomat ===
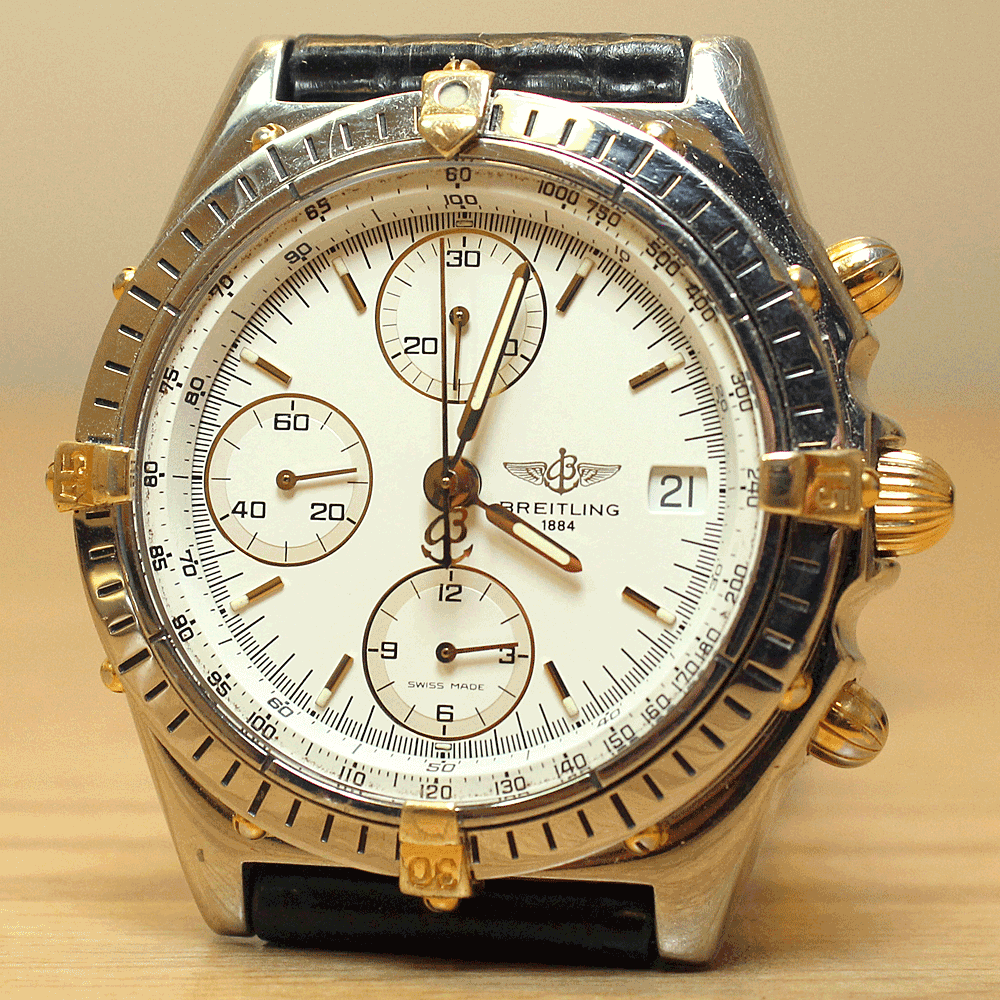
Breitling Chronomat, ref. B13050

The Chronomat is a collection from Breitling released in 1942, and remains one of the best-selling models produced by the manufacturer.

The first Chronomat had a circular slide rule and its design was inspired by military watches. Its movement was the Venus 175 with 17 jewels, a manual wind movement.

The current Chronomat was released in 2009 and was the first watch produced entirely by Breitling, featuring the in-house B01 caliber. The B01 movement has a 70-hour power reserve and COSC certification.

=== Emergency ===
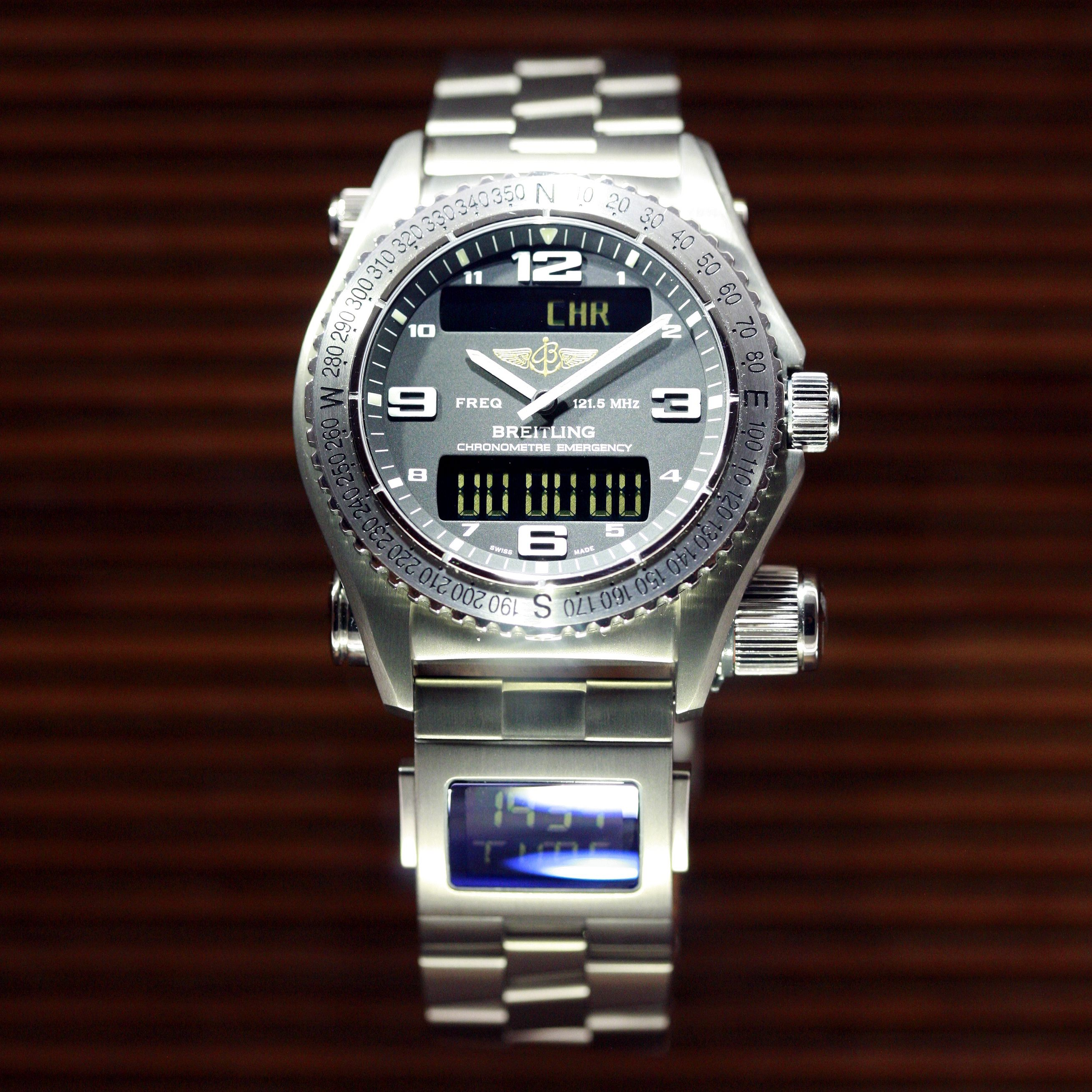
Breitling Emergency wristwatch

The Breitling Emergency watch contains a radio transmitter for civil aviation use, which broadcasts on the 121.5 MHz distress frequency and serves as a backup for ELT-type airborne beacons. For military users, the Emergency has a miniaturized transmitter operating on the 243.0 MHz military aviation emergency frequency. Under normal conditions—flat terrain or calm seas—the signal can be picked up at a range of up to 90 nautical miles (170 km) by search aircraft flying at 20,000 feet (6,100 m). Since February 2009, the Cospas-Sarsat Satellite System has not monitored the 121.5/243.0 MHz frequency; however, the signal transmitted by the Emergency was never strong enough to be picked up by satellite, and Breitling has announced that, as these frequencies will still be monitored by aviation, particularly during the localization phase of a rescue attempt, there are no plans to modify the signal's frequency.

Reuters reported in January 2003 two British pilots, Squadron Leader Steve Brooks and Flight Lieutenant Hugh Quentin-Smith, crashed their helicopter in Antarctica and were rescued after activating their Breitling Emergency transmitter watches.

The Emergency is available for customers without a pilot's license, but they must sign an agreement that they will bear the full costs of a rescue intervention should they trigger the distress beacon.

The model was heavily advertised by the Breitling Orbiter 3, with both Brian Jones and Bertrand Piccard wearing the Emergency. Breitling sponsored the Orbiter 3 project, which in 1999 became the first balloon to completely orbit the Earth without landing. A commemorative Orbiter 3 version of the Emergency watch was subsequently produced, with a production run of 1,999.

==== Emergency II ====
In April 2013, Breitling announced a new version of the Emergency watch. This upgrade transmits on the 121.5 MHz frequency, but adds the 406.04 MHz signal that is monitored by satellites. The watch has a separate, rechargeable battery dedicated to the transmitter.

=== Breitling for Bentley ===
In 2002, Breitling designed the dashboard clock for the Bentley Continental GT. The following year, Breitling started making chronographs for Bentley Motors. As part of the 10th anniversary of a Breitling–Bentley partnership, the Bentley B04 GMT, B05 Unitime and B06 (based on COSC Certified Breitling Calibre B04, B05 and B06 respectively) were produced. In 2015, Breitling designed the Mulliner Tourbillon dashboard clock for the Bentley Bentayga, which spins 3 times every 15 minutes. The partnership between Breitling and Bentley ended in 2021.

== Sponsorship ==
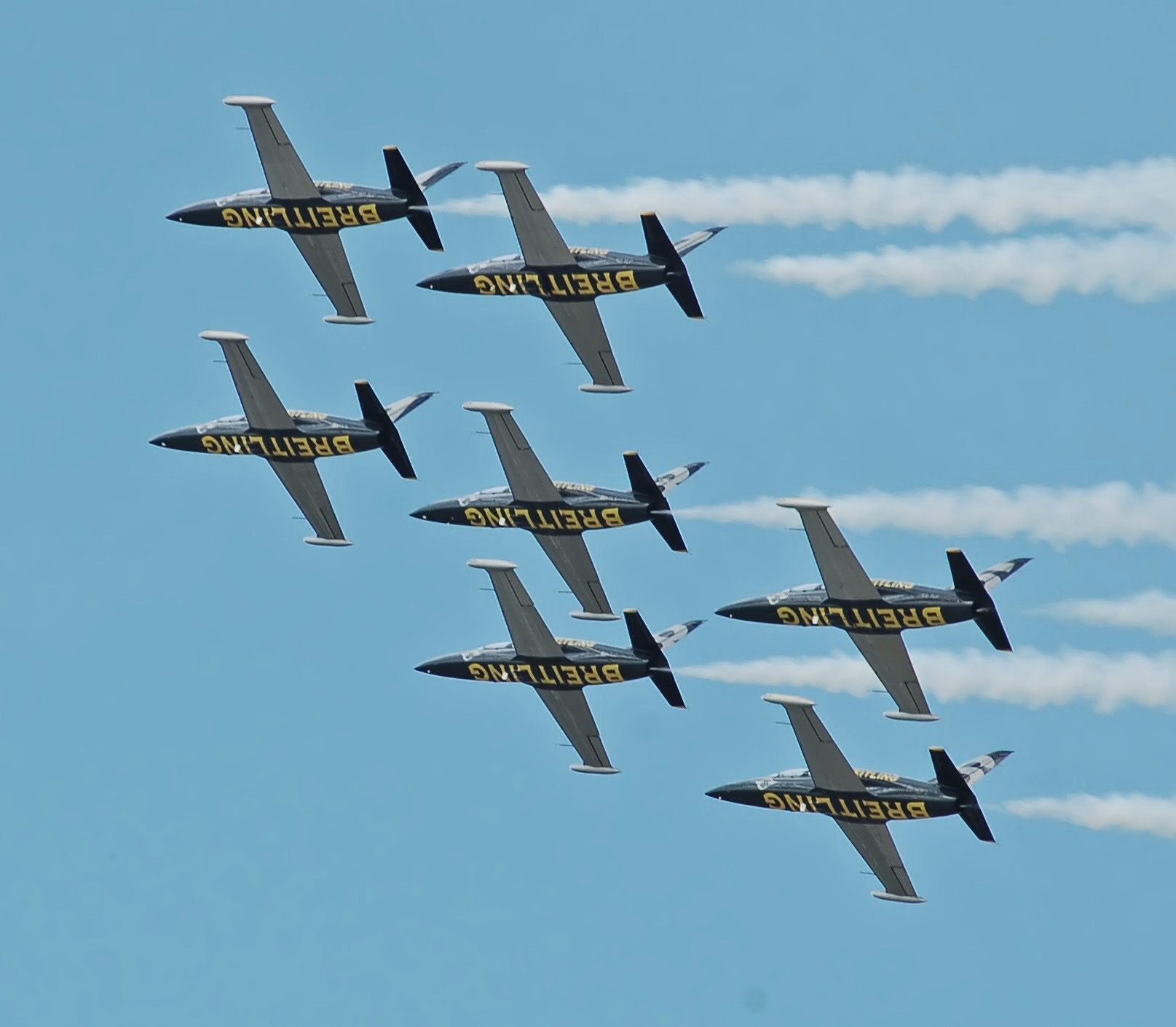
Aero L-39 Albatros aircraft of the Breitling Jet Team perform at RIAT in Fairford, England.

Breitling aeronautical sponsorships include the first circumnavigation of the globe by balloon (Breitling Orbiter); the fixed-wing jet pack flights of Yves Rossy; aerobatics teams, including the Breitling Jet Team and Breitling Wingwalkers; and the Reno Air Races from 2002 to 2015. Breitling was a sponsor of Team Bentley during its Le Mans 24 Hours campaign, from 2001 to 2003; to commemorate this, it created the Breitling-Bentley 24 Le Mans watch.

== In popular culture ==
In the 1965 James Bond movie Thunderball, Bond is given a Breitling Top Time, which contains a geiger counter, enabling him to track down two stolen nuclear warheads. After the movie was filmed, the watch disappeared and later resurfaced in a car boot sale in England in 2012, where it was purchased for £25. It later sold at Christie's auction house for over £100,000. In the same film, the SPECTRE pilot who hijacks the Vulcan bomber wears a Breitling Navitimer.

In Point Break, bankrobbing surfer Bodhi, played by Patrick Swayze, wears a Quartz Breitling Navitimer in a scene leading to a robbery; the watch is seen when Bodhi checks the time before declaring "Little hand says it's time to rock and roll".

In the 2006 film Blood Diamond, Leonardo DiCaprio's character Danny Archer wears a titanium Breitling Chrono Avenger with a black dial on a brown calf leather strap.

Jerry Seinfeld can be seen wearing either a Breitling Navitimer or Breitling Chronomat in nearly every episode of 1989–1998 TV series Seinfeld, and the later web series Comedians in Cars Getting Coffee. In the British automotive series Top Gear, Richard Hammond uses a Breitling Emergency II watch to be rescued by Jeremy Clarkson and James May.
