= Breitling Jet Team =

Aerobatic display team

- Breitling Jet Team logo
- Active: 2003–2019
- Country: France
- Type: Civilian aerobatic display team
- Garrison/HQ: Dijon, France
- Website: breitling.com

Aircraft flown
- Trainer: Aero L-39 Albatros

The Breitling Jet Team was the largest civilian aerobatic display team in Europe. Based in Dijon, France, it flew seven Aero L-39 Albatros jets. The team flew a display lasting 18–20 minutes that included formation flying, opposition passes, solo routines, and synchronized maneuvers. The team performed across Europe and the Middle East, with multiple engagements per year, including international airshows and Breitling corporate events. Breitling withdrew sponsorship in 2019 and the team discontinued performances.

== History and origins ==
The Breitling Jet Team was established in early 2003 with four L-39s. With the addition of two aircraft in 2004 and three in 2008, the team now has a total of nine jets. The Team's roots go back to 1980.

=== Patrouille Martini ===
Jacques Bothelin, the team leader, began performing in airshows in 1980 with a French-designed Mudry CAP 10 aircraft. In 1982, he began to fly as part of a team of three SIAI-Marchetti SF260s sponsored by Martini. The team was called Patrouille Martini, (patrouille is French for 'patrol' or 'team'). Also at that time, Jacques Bothelin established Apache Aviation at the team's Darois home base to handle the operational aspects of running a full-time aerobatic team. The Martini Team flew for five years in the SF260s, until the team took delivery of Swiss-manufactured Pilatus PC-7s, in 1988.

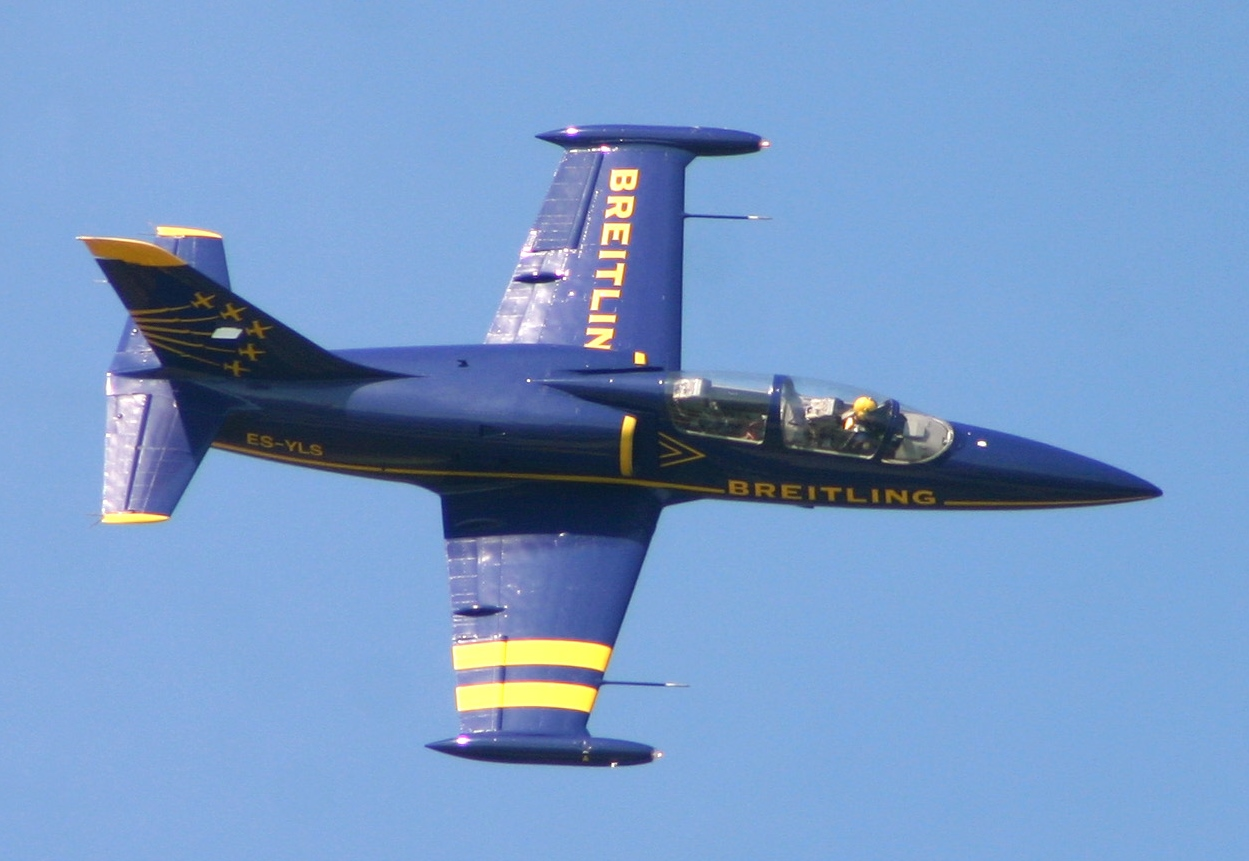
Breitling jet at Air 04, Payerne, Switzerland

=== Patrouille Ecco ===
In 1990, new regulations in France banning the advertising of alcohol forced Martini to withdraw its sponsorship. Ecco, a temporary employment agency, replaced Martini and the team was renamed Patrouille Ecco for the 1991 season. The team's colors changed from Martini's white to Ecco's green and white, and a fourth PC-7 was added. During the 1990s, Patrouille Ecco performed at airshows around Europe, the Middle East, and North Africa.

=== Patrouille Adecco ===
In 1997, Ecco merged with a Swiss firm, Adia, forming Adecco. The team's name changed to Patrouille Adecco, and its colours shifted to Adecco's red and white. In 1998, the team suffered a setback when Adecco pulled out of its sponsorship. Jacques Bothelin and Philippe Laloix flew during 1999–2001 in two PC-7s as "Les Apaches"; the name was derived from the Apache Aviation firm.

=== Khalifa Jet Team ===
In late 2001, a group of Algerian companies founded by Rafik Khalifa offered to sponsor Apache Aviation. The PC-7s were sold, and L-39 jets arrived as their replacement. The new team was known as the "Khalifa Jet Team", launching in March 2002, and making its airshow debut in May 2002. Over the summer of 2002, the team worked up from a two-ship formation to a four-aircraft team. Over the course of 2002, the team appeared at 43 events in six European countries.

=== Breitling ===
In early 2003, Khalifa pulled out of the sponsorship, and Breitling SA stepped in. The Breitling investment allowed the outfit to expand from four planes to the seven-ship formation it flies today. In 2015, the team embarked on a two-year tour of North America with performances at notable events like the Sun 'n Fun Fly-In, the Vectren Dayton Air Show, Jones Beach, NY, Rhode Island, AirVenture at Oshkosh and the Abbotsford International Airshow as well as the Canadian International Air Show in Canada. Their final North American performance concluded on October 23, 2016 at the Huntington Beach Airshow in Huntington Beach, California.

== Incidents ==
On 15 September 2012, the Breitling Jet Team #2 crew had to eject, and the L-39 jet crashed on a field near Kleine Brogel Air Base. Nobody was injured.
