= List of Swiss watch manufacturers =

This is a list of Swiss watch manufacturers and brands.

Entries with an article should also be suitable for inclusion in Category:Watch manufacturing companies of Switzerland or Category:Swiss watch brands.

Name	Logo	Founded (Year)	Founded (City)	Founder	Headquarters	Number of Employees	Company Type	Owner	Key people
88 Rue du Rhone		2012		Pierre and Elie Bernheim	Geneva			My Maracujá Sàrl	Pierre Bernheim
A. Favre & Fils									
Adriatica									
Allgemeine Gesellschaft der Schweizerischen Uhrenindustrie									
Andreas Strehler									
Anonimo		1997		Federico Massacesi	Florence, Italy		Private		
Aquastar		1962		Frédéric Robert	Geneva			Jeanrichard S.A.	
Arcadia Watches		1858	Fleurier	Claude Sanz	Geneva		Private		Richard Baldwin (CEO)
Armand Nicolet		1875		Armand Nicolet	Tramelan	20	Privately held company		
Ateliers deMonaco		2008			Geneva		Watch Manufacturer; Members of the Citizen Group		Pim Koeslag, Robert van Pappelendam, Peter Stas
Audemars Piguet		1875	Le Brassus	Jules Louis Audemars, Edward Auguste Piguet	Le Chenit	1,450	Private		Alessandro Bogliolo (Chairman); Olivier Audemars (Vice Chairman); Ilaria Resta (CEO)
BALL Watch Company		1891	Ohio, USA	Webb C. Ball	La Chaux-de-Fonds		Private		
Baume		2018			Meyrin		Subsidiary of Richemont Group	Compagnie Financière Richemont SA	
Baume et Mercier		1918	Les Bois	William Baume, Paul Mercier	Geneva		Subsidiary of Richemont		William Baume & Paul Mercier (Founders); David Chaumet (CEO)
Baumgartner Frères Grenchen (BFG)		1899	Grenchen	Arnold Baumgartner		1700 (in 1974)			
Bedat & Co		1996		Simone Bédat Christian Bédat	Geneva		Private Limited Company		
Bell & Ross		1992	Paris, France	Bruno Belamich; Carlos Rosillo	Paris		Private		
Bianchet		2017		Rodolfo and Emmanuelle Festa Bianchet	Neuchâtel		Private		Rodolfo and Emmanuelle Festa Bianchet
Blanchet		1819		Jean Blanchet				D Group	
Blancpain		1735	Villeret	Jehan-Jacques Blancpain	Paudex/Le Brassus		Subsidiary	The Swatch Group	Marc Hayek
Bovet Fleurier		1822		Edouard Bovet	Geneva		Privately held company		
Breguet		1775	Paris, France	Abraham-Louis Breguet	L'Abbaye		Subsidiary	The Swatch Group	Nicolas G. Hayek
Breitling SA		1884	Saint-Imier	Léon Breitling	Grenchen		Private	Partners Group	Georges Kern (CEO)
Cabot Watch Company									
Carl F. Bucherer		1888		Carl F. Bucherer	Lucerne	200	AG	Bucherer AG	Sascha Moeri (CEO); Jörg G. Bucherer (Chairman of the Board)
Catorex		1858		Constant Cattin	Les Breuleux		Private	Guy Albert Cattin	
Cecil Purnell		2006		Cecil Purnell	Geneva		Private		Cecil Purnell, Founder; Jonathan Purnell, co-founder, Horologist
Century Time Gems		1966		Hans-Ulrich Klingenberg	Nidau				Philip W. A. Klingenberg (current company head)
Certina		1888	Grenchen	Adolf & Alfred Kurth	Le Locle		Member of the Swatch group	The Swatch Group	
Charriol		1983		Philippe Charriol	Geneva		Privately held		
Chopard		1860	La Chaux-de-Fonds	Louis-Ulysse Chopard	Geneva		Private (société anonyme)	Scheufele family	Co-presidents: Caroline Scheufele; Karl-Friedrich Scheufele
Christian Jacques		1988		Christian Bach & Jacques Geeraerts	Basel				
Chronoswiss		1981	Munich, Germany	Gerd Rüdiger Lang	Lucerne	30	Private		Oliver Ebstein
Cimier									
Cortébert		1790	Cortébert	Abraham-Louis Juillard	Cortébert		Watch maker		
Cyma Watches		1862	Le Locle	Joseph Schwob, Theodore Schwob	La Chaux-de-Fonds		Privately held company Public (HKEX)		Under care of Universal Genève
Czapek & Cie		1845		François Czapek	Geneva		Privately held company		Xavier de Roquemaurel, CEO
Daniel Roth		1988			Vallée de Joux		Subsidiary	The Hour Glass; (1994–2000); Bulgari; (2000–2011); LVMH; (2011–present)	Daniel Roth
Davidoff				Zino Davidoff	Basel			Oettinger Davidoff AG	
De Grisogono		1993		Fawaz Gruosi	Geneva		Privately held company	De Grisogono	
Doxa S.A.		1889	Le Locle	Georges Ducommun					Romeo F. Jenny; Jan Edöcs (CEO)
Dreffa		1874	Geneva	Armand Dreyffus	Geneva		Wholly owned subsidiary	TGX Holdings	Armand Dreyfus(founder); Jacques Maguin (CEO); Mark Haus (President); Yehuda Fulda (chairman)
Dubey Schaldenbrand		1946		Georges Dubey; René Schaldenbrand	La Chaux-de-Fonds				Cinette Robert
ETA SA		1856	Grenchen	Urs Schild, Josef Girard	Grenchen		Subsidiary	The Swatch Group Ltd.	Damiano Casafina, CEO
Ebel		1911	La Chaux-de-Fonds	Eugène Blum, Alice Lévy	La Chaux-de-Fonds				
Eberhard & Co.		1887	La Chaux-de-Fonds	George-Emile Eberhard	La Chaux-de-Fonds				Barbara Monti, CEO, Mario Peserico, Managing Director
Ebosa		1915	Grenchen	Paul Leo Glocker					
Endura Watch Factory		1966	Biel/Bienne		Biel/Bienne		Subsidiary	The Swatch Group	Pierre-André Bühler, President
Epos		1983	Biel	Peter Hofer	Lengnau				Singi Chonge (chairman of the board); Tamdi Chonge (CEO)
Era Watch Company		1884		Christian Ruefli-Flury	Les Genevez		Private	Victor Strambini	Christian Hotz (CEO)
Ernest Borel		1856	Neuchâtel	Jules Borel	Le Noirmont				Teguh Halim (The Board of Directors of Ernest Borel S.A.)
Eterna		1856	Grenchen	Josef Girard and Urs Schild	Grenchen				
Excelsior Park		1866	Saint-Imier	Jules-Frédéric Jeanneret					
F. P. Journe		1999	Geneva	François-Paul Journe	Geneva		Private (SA)		
Favre-Leuba		1737		Abraham Favre	Solothurn				
Federation of the Swiss Watch Industry		1982			Bienne				Jean-Daniel Pasche
Fortis (Swiss watchmaker)		1912	Grenchen	Walter Vogt	Grenchen	40	Privately held company		Owner and CEO - Jupp Philipp
Franck Muller		1992			Geneva		Private company		Franck Muller
Frédérique Constant SA		1988		Aletta and Peter Stas	Geneva		Subsidiary of Citizen Holdings		Niels Eggerding, Managing Director
Gallet & Company		1826	Geneva	Humbertus Gallet			Privately held company		
General Watch Co									
Girard-Perregaux		1791	Geneva	Jean-François Bautte, Mouliné, Constant Girard, Marie Perregaux	La Chaux-de-Fonds		Subsidiary	Sowind Group	Patrick Pruniaux
Glycine (watch)		1913	Biel/Bienne	Eugène Meylan	Biel/Bienne		Subsidiary	Invicta Watch Group	Eyal Lalo (Parent Group CEO), Daniele Andreatta (Managing Director)
Greubel Forsey		2004		Robert Greubel; Stephen Forsey	La Chaux-de-Fonds		Private company		Antonio Calce, CEO
Grovana		1924	Tenniken			35	Private company		Christopher Bitterli (CEO)
Gérald Genta									
H. Moser & Cie		1828	Saint Petersburg	Heinrich Moser	Schaffhausen	100	Private	MELB Holding Group (Meylan family)	Georges-Henri Meylan (chairman); Roger Nicholas Balsiger (Honorary chairman); Edouard Meylan (CEO)
HYT (watchmaker)		2012		Lucien Vuillamoz (Inventor), Patrick Berdoz (chairman)	Neuchâtel	11			Gregory Dourde (CEO)
Hamilton Watch Company		1892	Lancaster, Pennsylvania, U.S.		Bienne		Subsidiary	The Swatch Group	
Hanowa		1963	Biel/Bienne	Hans Noll; Elisabeth Noll-Wirz	Möhlin		Public	ILG - International Luxury Group	Paris C. Brown (CEO)
Hublot		1980			Nyon	200	Subsidiary	LVMH	Carlo Crocco (founder); Ricardo Guadalupe (CEO)
IWC Schaffhausen		1868	Schaffhausen	Florentine Ariosto Jones	Schaffhausen	650	Subsidiary	Richemont	
Ikepod		1994		Oliver Ike; Marc Newson					
JC Biver		2022		Jean-Claude Biver (Founder) Pierre Biver (Founder)	Givrins		Private		
Jaeger-LeCoultre		1833	Le Sentier	Antoine LeCoultre	Le Sentier		Subsidiary	Richemont	Catherine Rénier, CEO
Jean Lassale		1976		Jean Bouchet-Lassale	Geneva		Private		Jean Bouchet-Lassale, founder; Pierre Mathys, watchmaker
Jean Perret		1893		Jean Perret	Geneva		Privately held company		
Jowissa		1951	Bettlach	Josef Wyss					
Juvenia		1860	Saint-Imier	Jacques Didisheim-Goldschmidt	La Chaux-de-Fonds		Subsidiary	Asia Commercial Holdings Ltd.	
Laurent Ferrier		2009		Laurent Ferrier	Plan-les-Ouates		Private		Laurent Ferrier; Christian Ferrier; François Servanin
Le Phare-Sultana S.A.		1888	Le Locle	Charles Barbezat					
Lemania		1884	L'Orient	Alfred Lugrin					
Linde Werdelin		2002			London & Copenhagen		Independent		Morten Linde; Jorn Werdelin
Longines		1832	Saint-Imier	Auguste Agassiz	Saint-Imier	340	Subsidiary	The Swatch Group	Matthias Breschan (President)
Louis Erard		1929		Louis Erard and André Perret	Le Noirmont		Privately held company		Alain Spinedi, Manuel Emch
Luminox		1989		Barry Cohen	San Rafael, California		Private	Mondaine	
Manufacture Modules Technologies		2015			Geneva		SARL		Philippe Fraboulet, CEO
Manufacture Royale		1770	Ferney-Voltaire	Voltaire	Vallorbe		Privately held company		
Mathey-Tissot		1886	Les Ponts-de-Martel	Edmond Mathey-Tissot	Geneva				
Maurice de Mauriac		1997			Zürich				
Maurice Lacroix		1975	Saignelégier		Zürich	220			
Maitres du Temps		2005			La Chaux-de-Fonds		Watchmaker		Steven M. Holtzman
Mido (watch)		1918	Biel/Bienne	George G. Schaeren	Le Locle		Member of the Swatch group	The Swatch Group	Franz Linder, President
Minerva		1858	Villeret	Charles Robert					
Mondaine		1951	Solothurn	Erwin Bernheim					
Montres Corum Sàrl		1955	La Chaux-de-Fonds	Gaston Ries, Simone Ries and René Bannwart	La Chaux-de-Fonds				Management Committee
Mouawad		1890	Beirut	David Mouawad	Dubai, Geneva	500	Private		Robert Mouawad, Fred Mouawad, Alain Mouawad, Pascal Mouawad and Jimmy Mouawad
Movado		1881	La Chaux-de-Fonds	Achille Ditesheim	Paramus, New Jersey, U.S.	1,457	Public		Efraim Grinberg (Chairman & CEO), Sallie A. DeMarsilis (CFO)
Nivada		1879	Grenchen	Jacob Schneider					
Ochs und junior		2006		Ludwig Oechslin; Kurt König	La Chaux-de-Fonds				
Ollech & Wajs		1956		Albert J. Wajs; Joseph Ollech	Zürich				
Omega SA		1848	La Chaux-de-Fonds	Louis Brandt	Biel/Bienne		Subsidiary	The Swatch Group	Raynald Aeschlimann (President)
Orfina		1922	Grenchen	Roland Rüefli	Grenchen		Private	Schifferle family	Umberto Maglioli
Oris		1904	Hölstein	Paul Cattin; Georges Christian	Hölstein	140	Private company		Ulrich W. Herzog, Chairman Claudine Gertiser-Herzog, Co-CEO Rolf Studer, Co-CEO
Parmigiani Fleurier		1996	Fleurier	Michel Parmigiani	Fleurier		Privately held company	Sandoz Family Foundation	Guido Terreni (CEO)
Patek Philippe		1839	Geneva	Antoni Patek, Franciszek Czapek, Adrien Philippe	Plan-les-Ouates		Private (Société Anonyme)	Stern family	Philippe Stern (Honorary President); Thierry Stern (President); Claude Peny (CEO); Laurent Bernasconi (General Manager)
Patria (watchmaker)		1892	La Chaux-de-Fonds	Louis Paul; César Brandt	Bienne				
Perrelet SA		1777		Abraham-Louis Perrelet	Biel/Bienne		Private	Festina Group	Miguel Rodriguez, President
Philippe Dufour		1992		Philippe Dufour	La Sentier		Watchmaking		
Piaget SA		1874	La Côte-aux-Fées	Georges Edouard Piaget	Geneva		Subsidiary	Richemont	Georges Edouard Piaget (Founder) Yves Piaget (President); Chabi Nouri (Chief Executive Officer)
Purnell (company)		2017		Maurizio Mazzocchi (CEO)	Geneva		Private		
Rado (watchmaker)		1917	Lengnau	Fritz Schlup Ernst Schlup Werner Schlup					
Raymond Weil		1976		Raymond Weil	Geneva	230			Elie Bernheim (CEO); Olivier Bernheim (President); Raymond Weil (Founder)
Revue Thommen		1853	Waldenburg	Gédéon Thommen Louis Tschopp	Baar, Switzerland				
Richard Mille		2001		Richard Mille; Dominique Guenat	Les Breuleux	350	Private	RICHARD MILLE Group	Richard Mille, (Chairman/CEO)
Richemont		1988	Geneva	Johann Rupert	Bellevue	34,000	Public	Compagnie Financière Rupert (Rupert family) (9.1% equity, 50% voting power)	Johann Rupert (Chairman); Jérôme Lambert (Group CEO)
Roamer of Switzerland		1888	Solothurn	Fritz Meyer	Wallbach, Aargau		Private	Chungnam Group of Companies	Christian Frommherz (CEO)
Rodania		1930	Grenchen	Baumgartner family					
Roger Dubuis		1995		Roger Dubuis & Carlos Dias	Geneva			Richemont International SA	
Rolex		1905	London	Hans Wilsdorf, Alfred Davis	Geneva	30,000	Private	Hans Wilsdorf Foundation	Jean-Frédéric Dufour (CEO)
Romain Gauthier		2002		Romain Gauthier	Le Sentier and Vallée de Joux				Romain Gauthier
Ronda (watchmaker)		1944	Lausen	William Mosset	Lausen	1,400			
Rotary Watches		1895	La Chaux-de-Fonds	Moise Dreyfuss	Elm Yard, 13-16 Elm Street, United Kingdom		Privately held company	Dreyfuss Group Ltd.	
Sandoz (watch company)			Tavannes	Henri Sandoz					
Schwarz Etienne		1902		Paul Arthur Schwarz and Olga Etienne	La Chaux-de-Fonds		Privately held company		
Solvil et Titus		1892		Paul Ditisheim	Hong Kong, Hong Kong				Paul Bernard Vogel (former owner); Joseph Chong Chun Wong (Chairman)
Sowind Group					La Chaux-de-Fonds, Le Locle				Patrick Pruniaux
Speake-Marin		2002	Bursins	Peter Speake-Marin	Geneva		Swiss watch brand		Christelle Rosnoblet (CEO)
Squale Watches		1959	Neuchâtel	Charles von Büren	Chiasso				Andrea Maggi, Massimo Maggi
Swatch		1983			Biel		Subsidiary	The Swatch Group	Nick Hayek Jr. (chairman, president)
TAG Heuer		1860	Saint-Imier	Edouard Heuer	La Chaux-de-Fonds		Wholly owned subsidiary	LVMH	Frédéric Arnault, CEO
Technos (watches)		1924	Welschenrohr	Joseph Gunzinger					
Tissot		1853	Le Locle	Charles-Félicien Tissot, Charles-Emile Tissot	Le Locle	250	Subsidiary	The Swatch Group	Sylvain Dolla (CEO); Georges Nicolas Hayek Jr. (chairman of the board)
Titoni		1919	Grenchen	Fritz Schluep	Grenchen	60	Private		Daniel Schluep (CEO)
Tudor Watches		1926	Geneva	Hans Wilsdorf	Geneva	194	Subsidiary	Montres Rolex SA	
Ulysse Nardin		1846	Le Locle	Ulysse Nardin	Le Locle		Subsidiary	Sowind Group	Patrick Pruniaux (CEO)
Universal Genève		1894	Le Locle, Neuchâtel	Numa-Emile Descombes, Ulysse Georges Perret, Louis Edouard Berthoud	Geneva		Privately held company (1894-1989); Public (HKEX) (1989–present)		Vincent Lapaire (CEO)
Vacheron Constantin		1755	Geneva	Jean-Marc Vacheron	Plan-les-Ouates	1,200	Subsidiary	Richemont (since 1996)	Louis Ferla (CEO)
Valbray		2009		Côme de Valbray and Olga Corsini	Romanel sur Morges		Private company		
Vanguart (watches)		2021	Switzerland	Thierry Fisher, Jeremy Frelechox, Axel Leuenberger, Mehmet Korutürk	La Chaux-de-Fonds		Private		
Victorinox		1884		Karl Elsener	Ibach	1,850	Aktiengesellschaft	Victorinox Foundation, Carl and Elise Elsener-Gut Foundation	Carl Elsener Jr. (President, CEO & Chairman)
Wenger		1893		Paul Boéchat	Delémont	150	Société anonyme	Victorinox AG	
West End Watch Co.		1886		Arnold Amstutz and Constant Droz	Leytron (Valais)		Private company		Jérôme Monnat Jr., current CEO
Zanuti		1887		Albert Favre Zanuti	Geneva		Private		
Zenith (watchmaker)		1865	Le Locle	Georges Favre-Jacot	Le Locle		Wholly owned subsidiary	LVMH	Julien Tornare (current CEO)
Zeno-Watch Basel		1868		Jules Godat	Basel	28	Private	Huber Family	Felix W. Huber

== See also ==
- List of watch manufacturers
- List of German watch manufacturers
- List of watchmakers
