= Adriatica =

Swiss watchmaker

Adriatica PR&A Watch Sagl
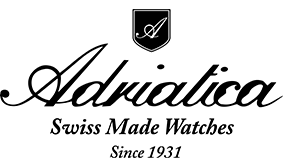
- Type: Private
- Industry: Watchmaking
- Founded: 1931; 95 years ago in, Switzerland
- Headquarters: Minusio, Switzerland
- Products: Watches
- Website: adriaticawatches.ch

Adria and Adriatica are parent Swiss watch brands manufacturing for Eastern European markets.

== Origin ==
The name originates from the Etruscan city of Atria (or Adria) that also gave its name at a much earlier period to the Adriatic Sea. It is believed that the name dates from 1931 or earlier.

== History ==
The history of Adria and Adriatica as watch trademarks is closely associated with the Belle Époque period through the Montilier Watch Co, established in 1852 in Montilier, close to Morat/Murten, at the foot of the Watch Valley, Switzerland. The brands were dormant from the start of World War II until 1949.

From 1962 two associated watch companies, established in Biel/Bienne and Basel, took over the manufacturing and marketing of Adria and Adriatica watch in partnership, designing mainly classical round pink gold-plated ladies’ and some gentlemen's models, and a special model called "Adriatica World Champion". Both brands, especially Adriatica, flourished in the Scandinavian countries, and also, especially, in Finland. Adriatica watches started being increasingly imported discreetly into Poland by seafaring people and being distributed there and in many of the non-communist countries, becoming established in the Eastern part of Europe.

In 1989, foreseeing the opening of trade, a family who owned the company as of 2013—took over the brands and developed them as manufacturers and distributors. Adriatica watches have always been Swiss made. Since 1998 they have been manufactured by their own company, PR & A Watch Sagl, in Dongio, in the watchmaking area of Ticino, the Italian-speaking part of Switzerland. Adriatica is a full member of the Federation of the Swiss Watch Industry FH.

== See also ==
- Cabot Watch Company
