= Patria =

Patria may refer to:

== Entertainment ==
- Patria (novel), a 2016 novel by Spanish writer Fernando Aramburu
- Patria (TV series), a 2020 limited television series, based on the novel
- Patria (serial), a 1917 American serial film

== Music ==
- "Pátria", the national anthem of East Timor
- Patria (theatre), a cycle of theatrical works by composer R. Murray Schafer

== Organizations ==
- National Pro Patria Party, El Salvadoran political party from 1931 to 1944
- Pro Patria Union, Estonian political party from 1995 to 2006
- Patria (company), a Finnish defence and aviation company
- Patria (watchmaker), Swiss watchmaker

== Military ==
- Patria AMV, a Finnish armored modular vehicle made by Patria
- Patria Pasi, a Finnish armored personnel carrier made by Patria
- Patria submachine gun, an Argentine submachine gun

== Ships ==
- SS Patria (1884), a Norwegian steamship
- SS Patria (1913), a French-built civilian ocean liner
  - Sinking in 1940, see Patria disaster
- ARA Patria, a light cruiser that served in the Argentine Navy between 1894 and 1927

== Other uses ==
- Homeland (from Latin patria, "fatherland")
- 1347 Patria, asteroid
- Patria (newspaper), a Cuban newspaper
- Patria, the Mexican name of the NDV-HXP-S COVID-19 vaccine

== See also ==
- Aurora Pro Patria 1919, an Italian association football club, based in Busto Arsizio, Lombardy
