= Watch Shop =

UK watch retailer

WatchShop
- Type: Subsidiary
- Industry: Retail
- Founded: 25 July 2007 in Reading United Kingdom
- Headquarters: Reading, Berkshire, United Kingdom
- Area served: United Kingdom
- Products: Watches, Jewellery, Sunglasses
- Parent: Aurum Holdings
- Website: https://www.watchshop.com

WatchShop is a UK online watch retailer. Established in 2007, it was acquired by the UK's largest luxury jeweller, Aurum Holdings Ltd., in 2014. It carries high-street and designer watches and jewellery from brands including Raymond Weil, Coach, and Frédérique Constant.

== History ==
The Watch Shop was initially registered under the name of SDK Jewellers Ltd., and launched as part of the Reading-based jewellery retailer SDK Jewellers, which was founded in 1991 by Sham Naib.

Naib's son, Kishore Naib, joined the business in 2007 and established the company's website. SDK Jewellers was officially renamed Watch Shop Ltd. in January 2013.

In June 2011, the company launched its first TV ad campaign, which aired across UK digital channels including ITV2, E4, More4 and Sky News.

Three years later, Watch Shop was purchased by Aurum Holdings, the largest luxury jeweller in the United Kingdom.

In April 2017, the company began selling sunglasses from designer brands including Ray-Ban, Nike and Emporio Armani.

=== Philanthropic efforts ===
In March 2011, the company partnered with Casio to raise relief funds for the 2011 Tohoku earthquake and tsunami.

In September 2016, the company worked with Guess watches and the Get In Touch Foundation to raise money for Breast Cancer Awareness.

== Cultural references ==
In 2011, the company supplied The X Factor TalkBack Thames production team with Casio watches.

== Awards ==
Year	Type of award	Awarding body
2018	eCommerce Watch Retailer of the year	Online retail
2017	eCommerce Watch Retailer of the year	Online retail
2016	Pureplay Top50 Ecommerce Retailers	Online retail
2011	Ranked 53 in Sunday Times Fast Track 100	Sales
2010	Ranked 16 in Sunday Times Fast Track 100	Sales
2010	Shopzilla Circle of Excellence Awards	Online retail
