= Orfina =

Orfina–Swiss SA
- Industry: Watch manufacturing
- Founded: 1922
- Founder: Roland Rüefli
- Headquarters: Grenchen, Switzerland
- Products: Watches
- Website: Official website

Orfina is a Swiss watch manufacturing company, best known for its Porsche Design range. Roland Rüefli founded his Grenchen watchmaking factory in 1922, formally establishing his workshop under his own name in 1923. In 1927 the name changed to Uhrenfabrik Jorin (Fabrique d'Horlogerie Jorin) and it changed again in 1929 to Finora. At this point it became an Aktiengesellschaft, a company with shareholders and a board of directors. Roland and his Wife Frieda becoming 50% shareholders and businessman Julius Brandts coming in as the Vice-President and final board member.

In the wake of the chablonnage crisis and the Great Depression, Finora went into liquidation in 1932. Shortly after Rüefli started again under his own name and registered the brand Orfina at the end the year. In 1943 during WW2, the company officially became Montres Orfina (Orfina Watches). This becomes Orfina Uhren AG (Montres Orfina SA) in 1947 after changing the company to an Aktiengesellschaft, allowing his Wife and Sons (Hans and Roland) to join the board. When Rüefli died in 1960, the company remained family-owned when Hans became President.

Immediately after retiring from motor racing in 1970, Umberto Maglioli purchased the watchmaker. The company in 1972 collaborated with Porsche Design, headed by Ferdinand Alexander, to produce the Chronograph One wristwatch. The Quartz crisis meant the production run ended only after a couple of years, however the watch went on to be worn by Mario Andretti and Gianni Agnelli amongst others. 1981 saw a collabration with Pininfarina to make quartz watches.

After Hans Rüefli resigned from the board and the death of Roland Rüefli, Maglioli became the Chairman of the company until its liquidation in 1995. The company was dissolved in 1997. In its current guise it is owned by the Schifferle family, after they restarted the brand in 1998.

== Notable appearances ==
- Sean Connery as James Bond in Never Say Never Again wears an Orfina Military Mark II
- Lewis Collins' character in Who Dares Wins wears a Porsche design Orfina.
- Martin Shaw's character Ray Doyle in The Professionals, episode Blackout wears a black Porsche design Orfina
- Tom Cruise wears an Orfina in Top Gun
- Chuck Norris and Lee Marvin, both wear Orfina watches in The Delta Force
- Brigitte Nielsen wears an Orfina watch during the robbery in Beverly Hills Cop II

== See also ==
- Federation of the Swiss Watch Industry
- List of Swiss watch manufacturers
- Swiss watchmaking industry
