= Squale (disambiguation) =

Squale or Software Quality Enhancement is an open-source platform that helps monitoring software quality for multi-language applications.

Squale may also refer to:

- Squale Watches, a Swiss watch brand
- Wassmer Squale, a glider designed and produced in France in the late 1960s
- Le Squale, a 1991 TV series by Claude Barma

== See also ==
- Moha La Squale (born 1995), French rapper
- Squalene, a compound originally obtained from shark liver oil
- Squalidae or dogfish sharks, a family of sharks in the order Squaliformes
  - Squalus or Spurdog, a genus of dogfish sharks in the family Squalidae
