= HYT =

HYT may refer to:

- HYT (watchmaker), Swiss
- High Year Tenure, in the US Armed Forces
- Hueytown, Alabama, US
- Hyde North railway station, England, station code
- Hytera, formerly HYT, a Chinese radio manufacturer
