= Watch Valley =

Watchmaking region of Switzerland

The "Watch Valley" covers all the Swiss Jura Arc, from Geneva to Basel, and is the primary location of the Swiss watch-making industry.

Beginning in 15th century Geneva and spreading northeast through the Jura Mountains, a majority of the companies related to the Swiss watchmaking industry were first established. Swiss watch companies developed a reputation through their long-established manufacturing practices and techniques.

Some of the watchmakers currently producing in the Watch Valley include Omega, Breitling, Corum, Gallet, Girard-Perregaux, Patek Philippe, Rolex, TAG Heuer, Blancpain, Ulysse Nardin, Chopard, Baume & Mercier, Movado, Tissot, Zodiac, Ebel and others.

Some of the earliest watchmakers to manufacture timepieces in the Watch Valley were Vacheron Constantin (Est. 1755), Breguet (Est. 1775), Blancpain (*Est. 1735), Jaquet Droz (Est. 1738 in La Chaux-de-Fonds), Favre-Leuba (Est. 1737 in Le Locle).

The distance across the Watch Valley; traveling from Geneva to Basel, is approximately 200 kilometers (120 mi).

== UNESCO World Heritage Sites ==
Both Le Locle and its geographical twin town La Chaux-de-Fonds have now been recognised as a UNESCO World Heritage Site, for their horological and related cultural past.

== See also ==
- Federation of the Swiss Watch Industry FH
- Canton of Vaud
- Canton of Berne
- Canton of Jura
- Basel-Country
- Canton of Neuchâtel
- Quartz crisis
