= Sascha Moeri =

Swiss-German businessman

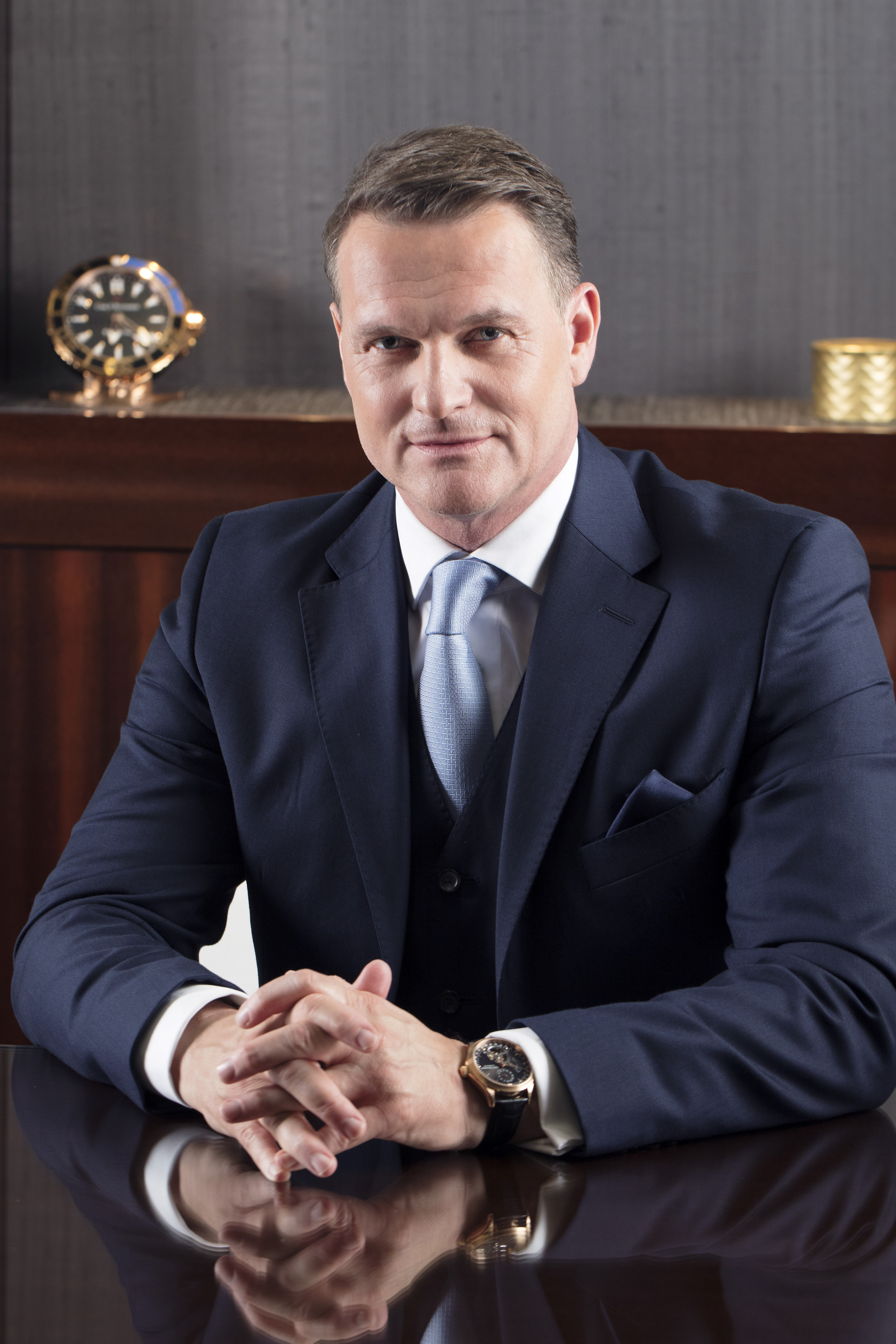
- Sascha Moeri (2019)
- Born: December 6, 1972 (age 53); Bern, Switzerland
- Occupation: Businessman

Sascha Moeri, born December 6, 1972, is a Swiss-German businessman.

== Early life and education ==
Moeri was born on December 6, 1972, in Biel and grew up in the Jura Mountains, the area in Switzerland known as Watch Valley. He graduated from the State University of New York at Albany with a BBA and an MBA in Business Administration.

== Career ==
At 22, Moeri joined The Swatch Group in the accounting department. Eight year later in 2002, He was appointed CEO of Milus Europe and Vice President of Milus (watchmaker) watch company, running the brand for eight years.

In 2010, Moeri became CEO of Swiss watch manufacturer Carl F. Bucherer. He conferred with engineers at the factory in Lengnau, Bern on the movements of the watches and with watchmakers on the five watch lines. By 2013 the production line had increased from 6000 watches to 20,000 pieces. The sales quintupled up to 30,000 pieces in 2019.

Moeri expanded into the US and Asian market, developing relationships with Hollywood and Asian celebrities to represent the brand. In 2014, Keanu Reeves, Ian McShane, and Willem Dafoe appeared in the film John Wick wearing the Manero line. Moeri continued working with the filmmakers incorporating watches into the storyline and actors in the John Wick Chapters, including Ruby Rose, Ian McShane, Bridget Moynahan, John Leguizamo, Laurence Fishburne, Common (rapper), and Joe Montegna.

In 2016 Moeri announced Li Bingbing as Global Brand Ambassador.

In 2017, in the film “Atomic Blonde” a secret list of undercover agents was hidden in a Bucherer watch that passed from one hand to another. The film's director, David Leitch, was a brand ambassador, Charlize Theron and James McAvoy wore the watch in the movie.

In 2018, Moeri established a storefront for Carl F. Bucherer on JD.com. At Baselworld in 2020 during the pandemic, he presented a new way of display, with activities and workshops to explore the watchmaking world.
