= William Baume =

- Born: 1885; Les Bois, Switzerland
- Died: 1956 (aged 70–71); Geneva, Switzerland
- Occupation: co-founder of Baume et Mercier

William Baume (1885–1956) was a Swiss watchmaker who established the Baume & Mercier company in Geneva in 1918 with his partner, Paul Mercier.

== Early life and family ==
William Baume was born into a notable family of watchmakers in the village of Les Bois in the Swiss Jura. His grandfather, Louis Victor Baume, and his great-uncle, Célestin Baume had founded the Frères Baume watch dealership in Les Bois in 1830. It was to become one of Switzerland’s major watch manufacturers in the 19th century, with branches in London, Geneva and Philadelphia. The Baume watch brand won distinctions at the universal expositions between 1860 and 1900, including a number of gold medals and Grand Prix for its watches. In 1892, its tourbillon chronometer set an absolute timekeeping record at the Kew Observatory trials that stood for 10 years.

== Management of Baume company ==
William Baume, who took over the management of the Baume company in Les Bois in 1910, represented the third generation after his grandfather and father. He had previously completed his watchmaking apprenticeship with Mathey-Tissot at Les Ponts-de-Martel, about 30 kilometers from Les Bois between Le Locle and Neuchâtel. Mathey-Tissot, established in 1886, was specialised in complicated watches, especially minute-repeaters and precision chronographs. It was thus with this specialist background that William Baume joined the family firm in 1909, working for a year with his father until he was entrusted with the management of the company in 1910. William Baume had then just turned 25. Meanwhile the London branch of Frères Baume, run by William’s uncle, Arthur Baume, was playing a leading role in the affairs of the business. After a family row, William Baume left Les Bois in 1918, shortly after the end of World War I. He settled in Geneva with the intention of starting a watch company.

== Partnership with Paul Mercier ==
In Geneva he came across his friend, Paul Mercier, whom he had met in 1912 as marketing manager of Haas of Geneva, one of the big names in Swiss watchmaking.

The two men joined forces to found Baume & Mercier in Geneva in 1918. Paul Mercier looked after the business side, while William Baume supervised the technical and watchmaking aspects. Their complementary talents ensured the quick success of the business, which relied on William Baume’s experience and the reputation of the Baume firm.

As an accomplished watchmaker, William Baume was instrumental in qualifying Baume & Mercier watches in 1919 for the Poinçon de Genève, an award for Geneva watchmaking.

William Baume’s watchmaking competence and Paul Mercier’s business acumen enabled Baume & Mercier to prosper during the economic crises of the late 1920s. In 1935, William Baume retired from the company for health reasons, and his sons had no interest in the business. Paul Mercier, retired two years later, selling his stake to the new partner, Ernesto Ponti, a businessman from the Piedmont who had acquired a stake in Baume & Mercier in 1934. William Baume died in Geneva in 1956.
