= Juvenia =

Juvenia Montres SA
- Company type: Subsidiary
- Industry: Watch manufacturing
- Founded: Saint-Imier, Switzerland (1860); 1959: Entry of the brand into the Heuroplan group, alongside Movado, Cyma Watches, Eska and Nappey
- Founder: Jacques Didisheim-Goldschmidt
- Headquarters: La Chaux-de-Fonds, Switzerland
- Products: Watches
- Parent: Asia Commercial Holdings Ltd.
- Website: www.juvenia.ch

Juvenia is a luxury Swiss watch manufacturer located in La Chaux-de-Fonds, Switzerland. It is one of the few Swiss watch companies to have manufactured watches without interruption since its creation. The brand is currently owned by Hong Kong group Asia Commercial Holdings Ltd.

== History ==
Juvenia was founded in 1860 by Jacques Didisheim-Goldschmidt in Saint-Imier, Switzerland. Shortly after he relocated to La Chaux-de-Fonds, expecting better opportunities. Jacques' son, Bernard, later succeeded his father.

In the 1880s, Juvenia produced one of the first ladies wristwatches. In 1914, Juvenia manufactured, at the time, the smallest movement constructed on a single level.

Juvenia is known for its extraordinary, avant-garde, case designs, unusual time indications and architectural inspiration.

In 1988, Juvenia was acquired by Asia Commercial Holdings Ltd. With such a long-standing record for timepieces innovation, Juvenia continues to produce fine watches with innovative characteristics and function. In particular, its first Sextant watch was born in the 1940s, featuring a "handless" display with a "graduated limb" indicating hours, a "compass" hand indicating minutes and a "Dauphine" sweep second hand recording seconds. This watch is admired by Johnny Depp who was seen wearing the antique on the cover of Esquire Magazine twice. Last year, JUVENIA officially announced the launch of the third edition of Sextant. Compared with Sextant II, the case diameter of Sextant III is enlarged from 34mm to 40mm, with date indication at 3 o’clock. The transparent case back offers a glimpse of the mechanical automatic movement.

== Watch models ==
A selection:

- Mystère – 1940
- Excentrique – Curved case equipped with a quartz movement
- Retro Automatic
- Arithmo – wristwatch, pocket- watch or desk clock (1945)
- Trigone – large triangular hands (1950s)
- Slimatic
- Sextant (1940s)
- Sport
- Macho
