= Maurice Lacroix =

Swiss luxury watch manufacturer

Maurice Lacroix SA

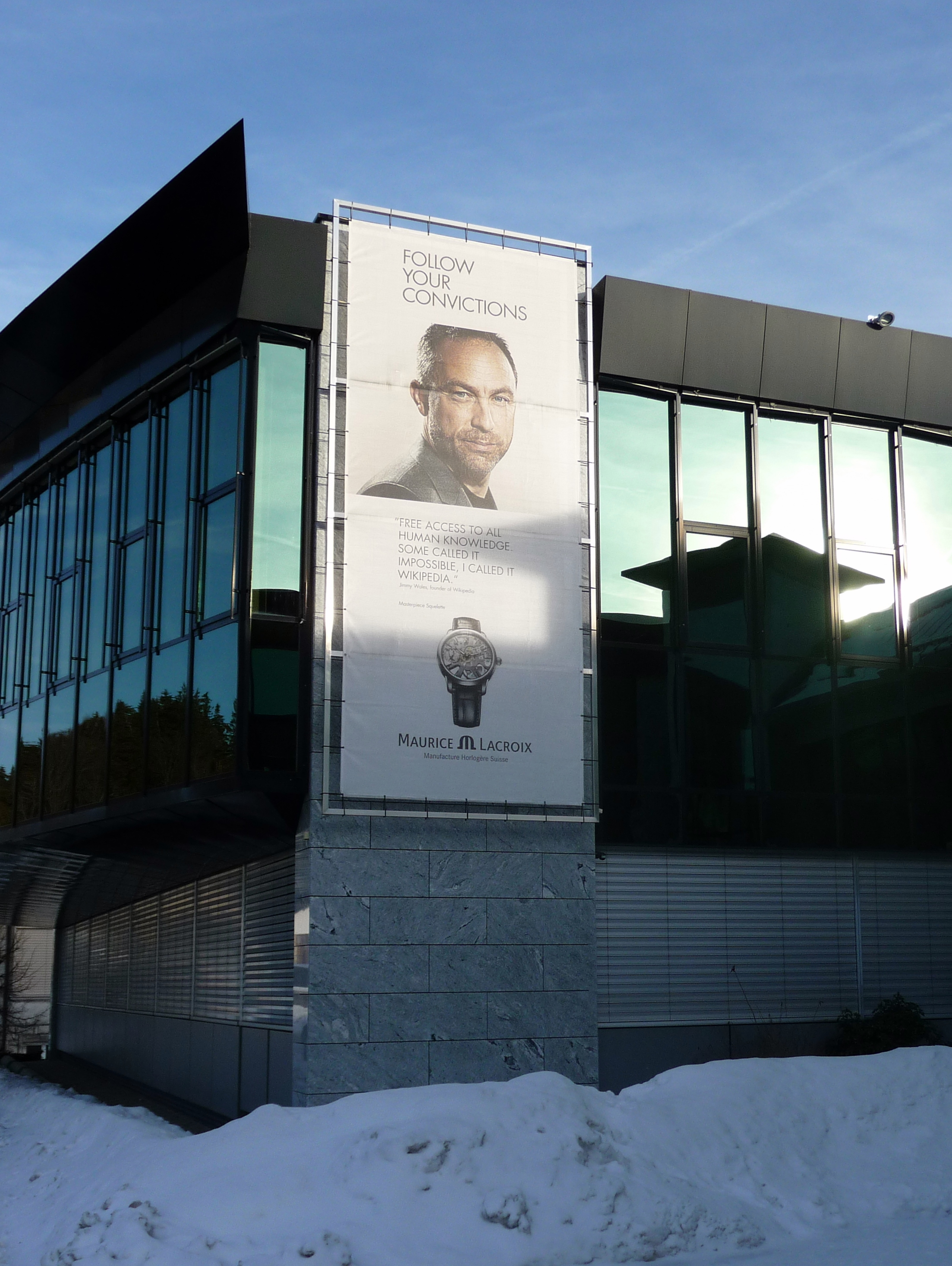
- Maurice Lacroix headquarters and manufacture in Saignelégier, Jura, featuring an advertising banner of Wikipedia founder Jimmy Wales from the brand's 2010 ambassador campaign.
- Type: Subsidiary
- Industry: Watchmaking
- Founded: 1975; 51 years ago
- Founder: Peter Brunner; Desco von Schulthess AG
- Headquarters: Saignelégier, Switzerland; 47.2587608°N 6.9968618°E
- Area served: Worldwide
- Key people: Stéphane Waser – Managing Director (CEO)
- Products: Luxury mechanical and quartz wristwatches
- Production output: Approx. 120,000 watches/year (c. 50,000 mechanical).
- Revenue: CHF 99.8 million (2013).
- Number of employees: Approx. 200 – 250
- Parent: Medinova AG (Zürich)
- Website: www.mauricelacroix.com

Maurice Lacroix is a Swiss luxury watch manufacturer with production sites in Saignelégier and Montfaucon in the Jura and corporate headquarters in Zurich. The brand was created in 1975 by the Zurich trading company Desco von Schulthess AG and developed from private-label assembly into a vertically integrated watch manufacture. Maurice Lacroix produces both quartz and mechanical watches and is known for its Masterpiece line and the commercially successful Aikon collection. The company is a subsidiary of Medinova AG for certain legal/branch registrations and has been held as a majority interest within the DKSH corporate group since 2011 (see Ownership).

== Lead and positioning ==
Maurice Lacroix positions itself as a Swiss manufacture combining in-house case production and movement finishing with accessible mechanical complexity. Industry and company profiles place the brand in the mid-tier segment of Swiss luxury watches, trading on a combination of mechanical heritage (Masterpiece) and contemporary, design-led lines (Aikon).

== History ==
=== Desco von Schulthess and the brand launch (1961 – 1975) ===
The Zurich trading company Desco von Schulthess (founded 1889) purchased the Tiara assembly workshop in Saignelégier in 1961 to produce private-label watches. In 1975 Desco launched the Maurice Lacroix brand; the name was chosen in honour of a board member who had died at the time of the brand's creation. Early market roll-outs included Austria (1975) and Spain (1976).

=== Expansion and vertical integration (1980s – 1990s) ===
By the 1980s the Saignelégier facility had grown and Maurice Lacroix reduced third-party assembly. In 1989 the company acquired the case-maker Queloz SA in Saignelégier, enabling in-house case manufacture and increased vertical integration.

In 1990 the firm introduced its high-end mechanical line, initially marketed as Les Mécaniques and later rebranded Masterpiece, a collection characterised by complications such as retrograde displays, regulators and exhibition casebacks.

=== Corporate independence and manufacture development (2001 – 2010) ===
In October 2001 Maurice Lacroix S.A. became an independent legal entity separate from Desco von Schulthess. In 2006 the company introduced the ML106 chronograph calibre developed in cooperation with Andreas Strehler, marking a step toward in-house calibre development and higher mechanical complexity.

=== Ownership changes, DKSH and sale rumours (2011 – present) ===
In July 2011 DKSH Holding acquired a majority stake in Maurice Lacroix, integrating the brand into DKSH's distribution network.

The company was put up for sale repeatedly in the 2010s and early 2020s, and reporting in business press documented interest from buyers and DKSH's intent to divest despite profitability. In April 2022 Maurice Lacroix stated it was profitable but remained for sale, according to Bloomberg reporting.

Business case studies and executive-education summaries have examined Maurice Lacroix as an example of brand repositioning and manufacturing strategy; these documents provide detailed chronological corporate information and management commentary.

== Corporate structure ==
Maurice Lacroix is organised under Maurice Lacroix Holding AG and operates manufacture sites in the Jura. Public commercial registries and company-information services show a branch entry "Maurice Lacroix succursale de Medinova" registered under Medinova AG in the Canton of Jura, while DKSH is reported as majority shareholder — these public records document the group's legal and operational structures.

== Manufacture, workforce and production ==
Maurice Lacroix's manufacture includes case production and movement finishing in Saignelégier and Montfaucon; company sources and industry press report a workforce in the low hundreds and annual production around 120,000 watches (c. 50,000 mechanical). These figures are provided in company profiles and independent press coverage and should be presented with date qualification where used.

== Products and collections ==
=== Masterpiece watches ===
The Les Mécaniques / Masterpiece line includes limited edition models based on historic or heritage movements purchased during the height of the quartz crisis and refinished to high standards. The company is also known for its alarm wristwatches, chronographs, and jump-hour Masterpiece watches, which Maurice Lacroix produced using heritage movements. In addition, this line includes watches based on extensively modified ébauches from ETA, Unitas and others that incorporate numerous complications, including retrograde movements, power-reserve indicators and calendar modules.

Maurice Lacroix is also known for its Mémoire 1 timepiece, which the company claims is one of the most complex watches ever made. Its movement is composed of 604 moving parts and it can switch between time and chronograph functions without losing track of either indication.

=== Manufacture movements ===
In 2006 Maurice Lacroix introduced its first full in-house movement, the ML106-based Masterpiece Le Chronographe. Since then the company introduced further manufacture movements, including an automatic movement in 2011. The shift to manufacture movements has been accompanied by a trend toward larger case sizes and a more modern/industrial aesthetic in some collections.

=== Aikon ===
Introduced in the 2010s as a contemporary sport-luxury line, the Aikon watches have an integrated bracelet design, and are available with automatic or quartz movements, and as chronographs and diver models. This line has been important, in that it allows Maurice Lacroix to offer a contemporary design and finishes at a relatively accessible price within the Swiss luxury market.

=== Other ranges ===
Other product families include Pontos, Fiaba, Eliros and Les Classiques, spanning dress and mid-luxury segments.

== Recent releases ==
From the late 2010s into the 2020s Maurice Lacroix released updated Aikon chronographs and diver variants and Masterpiece limited editions. Independent watch press and brand releases document these launches and technical improvements in finishing and movement integration.

== Market position and finance ==
Trade and business reporting place Maurice Lacroix among mid-sized Swiss watch brands; coverage in Swiss business press (Bilanz, NZZ) and international outlets (Bloomberg) emphasizes its manufacture credentials, international retail presence and occasional sale processes by its parent group. The brand has been covered in business education case material analyzing pricing, distribution and repositioning strategies.

== Sponsorships and ambassadors ==
Maurice Lacroix has used ambassadors and collaborations in sports, culture and design as part of its brand marketing.

In 2004 the company signed a three-year partnership with Swiss tennis player Roger Federer, producing special-edition models and involving Federer in promotional events.

In 2010 Maurice Lacroix ran an ambassador programme including cultural and sporting personalities such as Jimmy Wales, Bob Geldof, Ray Stevenson, James Magnussen, Orlando Duque, Jang Dong-gun and Justin Rose.

Maurice Lacroix is the official watch partner of FC Barcelona and the Red Bull Cliff Diving World Series. In 2018 it launched the “Friends of the Brand” programme and signed a sponsorship agreement with the #1 Swiss 3×3 basketball team, Team Lausanne.

In 2019 Maurice Lacroix collaborated with car manufacturer Kia to supply clocks for the Kia K9 sedan.

== Reception ==
Watch press generally praises Maurice Lacroix for delivering mechanical value and good finishing for its price segments. The Masterpiece line is frequently cited in trade reviews for technical interest, and the Aikon is commonly referenced as an effective design-led commercial offering within its price band.

== Selected further reading & case studies ==
- «Maurice Lacroix: Case Study», Swiss Chamber of Commerce / business school course pack (PDF).
- Executive Education (University of Zurich) analysis: Maurice Lacroix brand and repositioning overview.
