= Cecil Purnell =

Swiss luxury watch company

C. Purnell
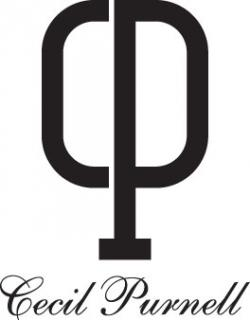
- Company type: Private
- Industry: Watch manufacturing
- Founded: 2006
- Founder: Cecil Purnell
- Headquarters: Geneva, Switzerland
- Key people: Cecil Purnell, Founder; Jonathan Purnell, Co-Founder, Horologist
- Products: Watches
- Website: https://www.cpurnell.com

Cecil Purnell was a Swiss luxury watch company based in Geneva, Switzerland that specialises in the production of high-end tourbillon watches.

== History ==
In 1918, the company's founder and namesake, Cecil Purnell, began his fascination with intricate mechanical horological mechanisms with the tourbillon of Abraham Louis Bréguet. His interest was transmitted to his grandson, Jonathan Purnell.

In 2006, Jonathan Purnell formed an association with watch industry professional Stéphane Valsamides and together they launched Cecil Purnell SA in the Swiss Jura Mountains. After years of development, in 2009, Cecil Purnell launched its first caliber that was developed fully in-house, the CP3000, and transferred the company's operations to Geneva, Switzerland. In 2010, Cecil Purnell became a micro-manufacturer that produces all of its components internally. The watchmaker launched its second complication, the Big Date caliber, in 2011.

Website: https://www.cpurnell.com
