= Cyma Watches =

Swiss manufacturer of luxury wristwatches

Cyma-Sarl, SA
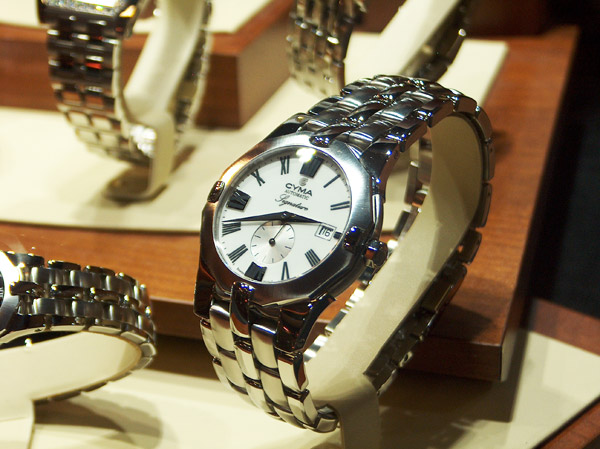
- Company type: Privately held company Public (HKEX)
- Industry: Watchmaking
- Founded: 1862, Switzerland Le Locle; 1959: Entry of the brand into the Heuroplan group, alongside Movado, Cyma, Eska and Nappey
- Founder: Joseph Schwob, Theodore Schwob
- Headquarters: La Chaux-de-Fonds, Switzerland
- Key people: Under care of Universal Genève
- Products: Watches
- Website: www.cyma.ch

Cyma SA is a Swiss manufacturer of luxury wristwatches, founded by brothers Joseph and Theodore Schwob in 1862. By 1908, Cyma was advertising the resilience of their timepieces when exposed to electricity, magnetism and varying temperatures. The company is currently owned by Stelux International, Ltd. a Hong Kong–based holdings firm which invests primarily in fine jewellery and watches, and is overseen by fellow Fédération de L'industrie Horlogère Suisse member Universal Genève.

== History ==
The Schwob brothers named the company cyma, a Latin word meaning "sprout", and the origin of the French cime ("summit"). In early years, the company had a staff of 40 people and 55 machines that together produced about 40 watches a day. However, it was not until 1892 in which the brothers partnered with Frédéric Henri Sandoz, the owner of the watch wholesale company, Henri Sandoz et Cie, that the business expanded. Under Sandoz's leadership, the company became the Cyma Watch Company and built the Cyma factory in La Chaux-de-Fonds, Switzerland in the Jura Mountains, near Le Locle. Both towns had been the center of the Swiss watchmaking industry during the 19th century.

In 1959 the brand was bought by the Heuroplan group, joining Movado, Eska and Nappey.

The company is currently located in Le Locle and is provincially managed by Claude and Françoise Guilgot. On 9 September 2010, Cyma SA and E-Watch organised an event in Yverdon to launch their new brand collection, Myriad.

== Price and value ==
Cyma watches from the 1950s retailed between approximately $400 and $25,000 (figures adjusted to 2010 inflation).
