= Mathey-Tissot =

Swiss watchmaker

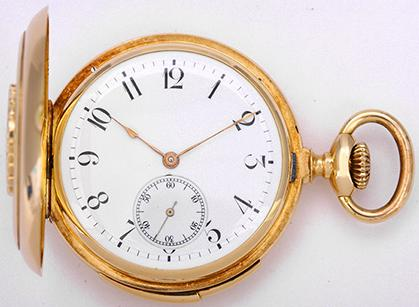
Mathey-Tissot gold minute-repeater pocket watch, c. 1909

Mathey-Tissot (English: /mætˌeɪ tiːˈsoʊ/, French: [mate tiso]) is a Swiss watch brand and manufacturer, originally established in 1886 by Edmond Mathey-Tissot at Les Ponts-de-Martel in the canton of Neuchâtel in Switzerland, now with its headquarters in Geneva and Fribourg.

An independent watchmaker, Mathey-Tissot is not associated with Tissot, another Swiss watchmaking firm.

== History ==
Edmond Mathey-Tissot established his watchmaking business in the village of Les Ponts-de-Martel in 1886. He began by specializing in complications, and especially repeater pocket watches, that is, watches which chime the hour or the hour and quarter-hour (quarter-repeater) or the hour, quarter-hour and minute (minute-repeater). The firm soon proceeded to make chronographs and won a number of prizes.

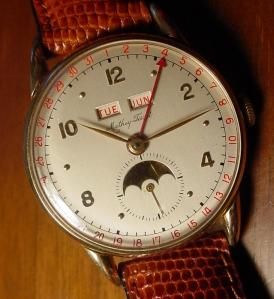
Mathey-Tissot 'Calamatic' gold triple calendar moon phase watch, c. 1947

In 1899, the outbreak of the Second Boer War led to such an expansion in demand for Mathey-Tissot watches that a new factory was built. Among the orders received was one from a nobleman in Scotland, who commissioned 2,500 watches, having decided to present every man in his son's regiment with a repeater watch: in gold for officers, silver for other ranks.

In 1914, Mathey-Tissot was represented at the Kew Observatory Competition by six Observatory Chronometers capable of split-second timing, all six being rated 'Class A' with the comment 'specially good'. The same year, Mathey-Tissot gained the Grand Prix at the Swiss National Exhibition. During the First World War, the company supplied the United States Army's Corps of Engineers with precision chronographs in large quantities, while General Pershing, commanding the United States Expeditionary Force, chose the watch to award to members of his own staff. Both before and after the Second World War, the company continued to supply the U. S. Army and the Royal Navy.

The name 'E. Mathey-Tissot & Co.' was protected by trademark in the United States in 1937.

The firm at one time had good relations with China and made watches of Chinese designs for that market which have been described as "complicated and painstaking pieces... in the realm of superior watchmaking".

In 1969 and 1970, Elvis Presley bought several dozen customized Mathey-Tissot automatic watches for giving to family, friends, and staff. The bezel settings of these bear the name ELVIS PRESLEY in raised letters, with four stars, and they identified the wearers as having a privileged right of access to Presley's concerts and tours.

== Present-day ==
Like most Swiss watchmakers, Mathey-Tissot no longer produces its own watch movements in house. Instead, the company customizes mechanical and quartz watches with movements sourced from others. Its logo is similar to the "peace symbol" of the Campaign for Nuclear Disarmament, but turned upside-down, with the words Mathey-Tissot in manuscript, above the printed words "since 1886".

The name of Mathey-Tissot is registered with the World Intellectual Property Organization, under the company name E. Mathey-Tissot & Co. SA, of Boulevard de Pérolle, Fribourg, Switzerland.

== See also ==
- List of watch manufactures
- Manufacture d'horlogerie
- Federation of the Swiss Watch Industry FH
