= Jowissa =

The Jowissa Watch Ltd. was founded by Josef Wyss in 1951. He started to manufacture watches in his own house in Bettlach (SO), Switzerland, with two fellow employees. In the first years they manufactured watches for other brands. The business expanded factory in 1958. As a consequence, a separate factory was built next to the residence of Mr. Wyss and more employees were recruited.

During the 1970s, Jowissa Watch Ltd. was taken over by the second generation of the Wyss family. Josef's sons Erich, Manfred, and Leander Wyss decided to start manufacturing watches under their own brand "Jowissa", a shortcut of "Josef Wyss AG". At the same time Jowissa moved its headquarters and the factory to a new location in Bettlach.
