= Rodania =

Swiss watch-maker company

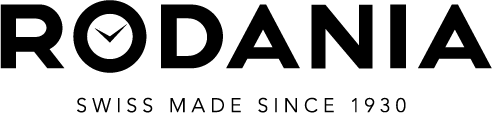
- Genre: Watches
- Founded: 1930
- Founder: Hans Baumgartner
- Website: https://www.rodania.com/

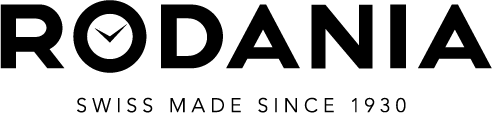
The brand logo of the "Rodania" watch company.

Rodania is a Swiss manufacturer of wristwatches. The company was founded in Grenchen, Switzerland, a city well known for its watch industry. Actually, its international sales and distribution offices are located in Braine l'Alleud, Belgium.

== History ==
The company was founded by the Baumgartner family in 1930, and soon began to grow. The company had an excellent reputation and was famous for its slim lines and pocket watches. In order to support the growth the company opened sales offices in New York, Montreal, Caracas, Madrid and Brussels.

From 1951, the Brussels branch was placed under the supervision of Mr. Manfred Aebi, a young Swiss immigrant who was suffering from polio. Although leading the Belgian branch was meant to be only temporary, his marriage to Simone Verlinden made him stay permanently in the country. The couple had three children - Christiane, Daniël and Belinda - all of whom became employees of Rodania. The family initially held offices in Lombardstraat, in the heart of Brussels, but later moved to a mansion in Wemmel.

The brand was first introduced under the name Rodana. After a legal imbroglia, the brand changed its name in 1952 to Rodania.

The Geometer chronograph in stainless steel was introduced in 1954. Despite its long availability in the catalogue, it was manufactured in low quantities with a total production estimated at less than 1000 pieces. The chronograph is powered by a Valjoux 72 calibre, adjusted to 3 positions. This was a surprisingly rare feature in 1954, as most manufacturers would then encase unadjusted Valjoux 72 movements. Something which showed they really cared. Only Rolex really did that then. The Geometer was produced with either a black or a silver dial.

As for all Swiss watch brands, the invasion of cheaper watches equipped with quartz movements from Japan and the Far East represented a severe threat to the brand, and although the Swiss management fought hard to get a grip on the situation, business began shrinking rapidly. By the mid-nineties the factory in Grenchen was only a fraction of what it had been and bankruptcy was imminent. Having become absolute market leaders in Belgium, the Aebi family could not afford the brand to disappear and came to the rescue. They bought the brand, licenses and all copyrights, thus ensuring the brand's continued existence. Following this operation the Brussels office became the international sales and distribution center.

Under the supervision of the Aebi family, the Rodania brand maintained its position as an important player in the watch industry, and successfully opened a subsidiary in France. They also started exporting the watches again. After the retirement of Manfred and Simone Aebi, the children took over the business from their parents and assumed directorships within the company.

The company wanted to maintain its position in the Benelux but also had bigger international aspirations. The family therefore decided to attract foreign capital by means of Belgo-Dutch investment group BV Capital Partners. The family sold the company to this investment group and is no longer a shareholder. It was then acquired in 2015 by Belgian investor Philip Cracco.

In 2010, Rodania celebrated its 80 years of watchmaking and reintroduced automatic models to its collection.

In 2022, Rodania was acquired by the Vincent Gaye Company. Based in Belgium, this company specializes in the distribution of jewelry and watches and intends to use its expertise in the sector to redeploy the brand.
