= Favre-Leuba =

Swiss watch manufacturer

- Type: Subsidiary
- Industry: Watch manufacturing
- Founded: 1737; 289 years ago
- Founders: Abraham Favre; Frederic Favre; Henry-Louis Favre
- Headquarters: Grenchen, Switzerland
- Area served: Worldwide
- Products: Luxury Watches
- Parent: Ethos Ltd.
- Website: www.favreleuba.com

Favre-Leuba is a Swiss luxury wristwatch manufacturer headquartered in Grenchen, Switzerland, and formerly a pioneer in watch design, manufacturing and distribution. The brand was established in 1737, following the registration of Abraham Favre as a watchmaker. One of his descendants, Henry-Augustus Favre, collaborated with Auguste Leuba, which led to the creation of the brand name Favre-Leuba in 1815. The company was sold in 1985 due to the ongoing quartz crisis, which made mechanical watches less popular.

Favre-Leuba has collaborated and supported numerous mountaineers, as their Bivouac watches feature an altimeter and an aneroid barometer. Favre-Leuba is the second-oldest watch brand in the world, with Blancpain having been founded two years prior. From 2011 to 2023, the brand was owned by Titan Company, the watch manufacturing company of the Tata Group. The brand was later acquired by Silvercity Brands. As of 2024, Favre-Leuba is now owned by Indian watch retailer Ethos Ltd., following a relaunch of the Swiss company.

== History ==
Established in 1737, Favre-Leuba is the second-oldest watch brand in the world, with Blancpain having been founded two years earlier in 1735. An archival document from 13 March 1737 declared Abraham Favre (1702–1790) a watchmaker with his own workshop in Le Locle. In 1792, his son, who was also named Abraham Favre, along with his two sons, Frederic and Henry-Louis, founded the company A. Favre & Fils in Le Locle. Abraham Favre had always concentrated on improving the technology of his watches, their properties at different temperatures, and the materials used in watchmaking to make more reliable and accurate movements. Frederic Favre's 19-year-old son, Henry-August, collaborated with Auguste Leuba, a member of a family of watchmakers and merchants, creating the brand name Favre-Leuba in 1815 and broadening the family business to the world market.

=== Further development and innovations ===
Fritz Favre, who married Adele-Fanny Leuba in 1855, expanded the business across Europe, the Americas and Asia. In 1865, the brand expanded to India, the first Swiss watch company to have established itself in that country. Favre participated in various national and international exhibitions, such as the Great Exhibition and the Exhibition of the Industry of All Nations, which were held in 1851 and 1853, respectively. Henri Favre-Leuba (1865–1961) continued to grow and develop the business by setting up offices and employing representatives across South America, Africa, the Middle East, Far East, and Europe. By the end of World War II, India was the company's most important market due to its office in Mumbai.

Around 1925, Favre-Leuba produced a single-button chronograph and created the original model of the Reverso watch, which was designed to withstand polo games. The company continued to make innovations, such as the first manual-winding in-house caliber FL101 movement in 1955, which was first used in the Sea Chief, Sea King, and Sea Raider watch models. In 1957, the company designed FL103 and 104, two automatic calibers. Five years later, the new FL251 caliber, an extra-flat, twin-barrel with a 50-hour power reserve and a central second hand, was launched, along with the Bivouac, the first mechanical watch with an altimeter and an aneroid barometer. Paul-Émile Victor was among the first people to wear the Bivouac when he expeditioned to Antarctica, and Michel Vaucher and Walter Bonatti used the watch during their summit on the Grandes Jorasses in the Alps. In 1964, the Deep Blue, which is water-resistant up to 200 meters, was launched, followed by the Bathy in 1968, the first mechanical watch that measured the dive time, duration, and diving depth. The same year the Bathy was released, Favre-Leuba added automatic winding to its calibers, making it one of the first companies to produce this combination. In 1967, Favre-Leuba received first prize in the Chronographs and Sports Watches category at Expo 67, the World's Fair held in Montreal. The award was presented by the Federation of the Swiss Watch Industry, with the Favre-Leuba Centurion identified as the winning model.

=== Quartz crisis and aftermath ===
Florian A. Favre and Eric A. Favre, sons of Henry A. Favre, along with Frederic A. Favre, grandson of Fritz-Augustus Favre, represented the eighth generation. They were the Board of Directors of Favre-Leuba until the management of the company passed out of the hands of the family. The industry-wide quartz crisis brought about by the inexpensive quartz movement introduced in 1969 greatly decreased demand for the company's comparatively expensive mechanical watches, forcing the family to sell their company in the 1980s. Afterwards, the company passed through several different owners including Benedom SA and LVMH.

In 2007, Favre-Leuba returned to the watch industry with the launch of The Mercury Collection, which comprises three watches: a Chronograph and a Big Date in rose gold, and a steel Power Reserve. On 16 November 2011, Titan Company, the watch manufacturing company of the Tata Group, acquired the brand Favre-Leuba. After the sale to the Titan Group, the company released the Raider Harpoon in 2016. In 2023, the brand was acquired by Silvercity Brands.

=== Collaborations with athletes ===
Following the creation of the Bivouac in 1962, Favre-Leuba has had a history of collaborating with numerous athletes, especially mountaineers and explorers. In 1964, Italian mountaineer Walter Bonatti used the Bivouac to climb up the north face of Pointe Whymper in the Grandes Jorasses, which was at a nearly vertical slope. Japanese mountaineer Junko Tabei wore a Bivouac during her Everest summit in 1975, becoming the first woman to climb Mount Everest. The company launched the Raider Bivouac 9000 at BaselWorld 2017, making it the only watch to mechanically measure altitudes up to 9000m. The watch was awarded the best watch in the New Star category by WatchStars. The 70-member jury, which comprised watch expert, journalists, and collectors, chose 35 watches and of this voted for the New Star 2018 winner.

In 2017, Favre-Leuba supported many athletes and explorers such as Pen Hadow and Erik de Jong, who led the Arctic Mission. The company also partnered with Satyarup Siddhanta, the youngest mountaineer in the world and the first from India to climb both the Seven Summits and Volcanic Seven Summits. A former ambassador of Favre-Leuba, Sayuri Kinoshita, broke the world record of a constant free immersion at the Vertical Blue competition.

Favre-Leuba has collaborated with professional mountaineers such as Adrian Ballinger, who, along with his team, summited Mount Everest with the Raider Bivouac 9000 in May 2018. The brand has also collaborated with Emily Harrington, who used the same watch in her 2018 expedition, as well as Swiss athletes Ralph Weber, Nicolas Hojac, and Ricardo Feller.

=== Acquisition by Ethos ===
In 2023, the chairman of Favre-Leuba, Patrik Hoffmann, began planning on expanding its global market to India. The company was relaunched in 2024, and it is now owned by Indian watch retailer Ethos Ltd. Twenty-six new watch models were released at Geneva Watch Days 2024, including revivals of previous collections such as the Deep Blue. Hoffman initially chose the United States as Favre-Leuba's main market, but he switched to India due to tariffs in the second Trump administration, which included a 39 per cent levy on Swiss products.
