= Nicolas Hojac =

Swiss mountaineer

Nicolas Hojac (born 13 July 1992) is a Swiss mountaineer. At age 20, he became one of the youngest climbers to have successfully climbed the North Face trilogy.

== Education ==
Hojac grew up in Niederscherli, near Bern, and completed an apprenticeship as an automation technician. He later pursued mechanical engineering studies at the Bern University of Applied Sciences in Burgdorf.

== Career ==
Hojac is considered one of Switzerland's leading mountaineers. At the age of 14, Hojac discovered his passion for the mountains during a language stay in Lower Valais. By the age of 18, he had climbed the north face of the Eiger for the first time, followed by ascents of the north faces of the Matterhorn and the Grandes Jorasses. At 20, he became one of the youngest climbers to have completed the trilogy of the three great north faces of the Alps.

From 2014 to 2016, Hojac was part of the expedition team of the Swiss Alpine Club. The culmination of this three-year training period was an expedition to the Tian Shan Mountains in China, where the team completed several first ascents. This project was documented by Swiss television and later aired as the documentary "Hoch Hinaus - The Expedition Team" on SRF 2.

On November 11, 2015, Hojac, alongside renowned alpinist Ueli Steck, set a new speed record for a rope team on the Eiger North Face, climbing the Heckmair route in just 3 hours and 46 minutes. In the years following, Hojac specialized in speed mountaineering in the Alps and expedition climbing across the globe. He has made first ascents in the Alps, China, Patagonia, and Norway.

In July 2021, Hojac featured in the film The Soloist VR, where he assisted Alex Honnold in free solo climbs across the Alps and Dolomites. The film later won an award at the Cannes Film Festival.

On September 9, 2023, Hojac, along with Adrian Zurbrügg, completed the Schreckmarathon in 18 hours and 52 minutes. They crossed seven peaks—Mättenberg, Ankebälli, Gwächta, Klein Schreckhorn, Nässihorn, Schreckhorn, and Lauteraarhorn—covering a total distance of 42 kilometres (26 mi).

=== Accomplishments and records ===
- 2023: Schreckmarathon in 18 hours and 52 minutes, with Adrian Zurbrügg
- 2022: Swiss Skyline (Eiger, Mönch and Jungfrau) speed ascent in 13h and 8min
- 2021: Speed ascent of the three edges and three north faces of the Drei Zinnen together with Simon Gietl
- 2020: Spaghetti tour 18 x 4000m, Monte Rosa Hut to Klein Matterhorn in 13h 39min together with Adrian Zurbrügg
- 2019: First ascent of the east face of Cerro Cachet, "homenajo a los amigos perdidos", M7+ together with Stephan Siegrist and Lukas Hinterberger
- 2019: Sport climbing routes up to 8c
- 2018: From the lowest point in Switzerland to the highest and back to the valley in 14h 2min (in combination with the paraglider)
- 2017: Speed ascent of the Jungfrau, Mönch and Eiger in one day with the paraglider from valley to valley in 11h 43min
- 2017: First ascent Norway, Breidtinden, "Surf & Turf", AI4, M6, 350m
- 2017: First ascent Norway, Finnkona, "Another day in paradise", AI5, M6, 400m
- 2016: Jungfrau-North face, first ascent "Eis am Stiel" M5+, 550m
- 2016: First ascent of "Deadmen Peak" 5400m, China
- 2016: First ascent of "Red Ball Peak" 4922m, China
- 2015: Eiger North Face, Heckmair, rope team speed record with Ueli Steck in 3h 46min
- 2015: Eiger North Face, combination Metanoia-Japaner together with Ueli Steck
- 2015: Wendenstöcke, "Ben Hur", 7c+, 350m, Rotpoint
- 2015: Breitwangfluh, Flying Circus, M10, 165m, Onsight
- 2014: Verdon, "Dame Cookie", 8a+, 180m Rotpunkt
- 2013: Completion of the Eiger, Matterhorn and Grandes Jorasses North Face trilogy
- 2011: Mönch Lauper route, solo
