= Squale Watches =

Swiss watch brand

Squale SA
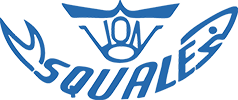
- Industry: Watchmaking
- Founded: 1959; 67 years ago Neuchâtel, Switzerland
- Founder: Charles von Büren
- Headquarters: Chiasso, Switzerland
- Key people: Andrea Maggi
- Website: www.squale.ch

Squale SA (French: [skwal]) is a Swiss watch brand founded in 1959 by Charles von Büren, specializing in professional diving watches. Squale is owned by the Maggi Family, who had previously been distributors of von Büren/Squale watches in Italy.

== History ==
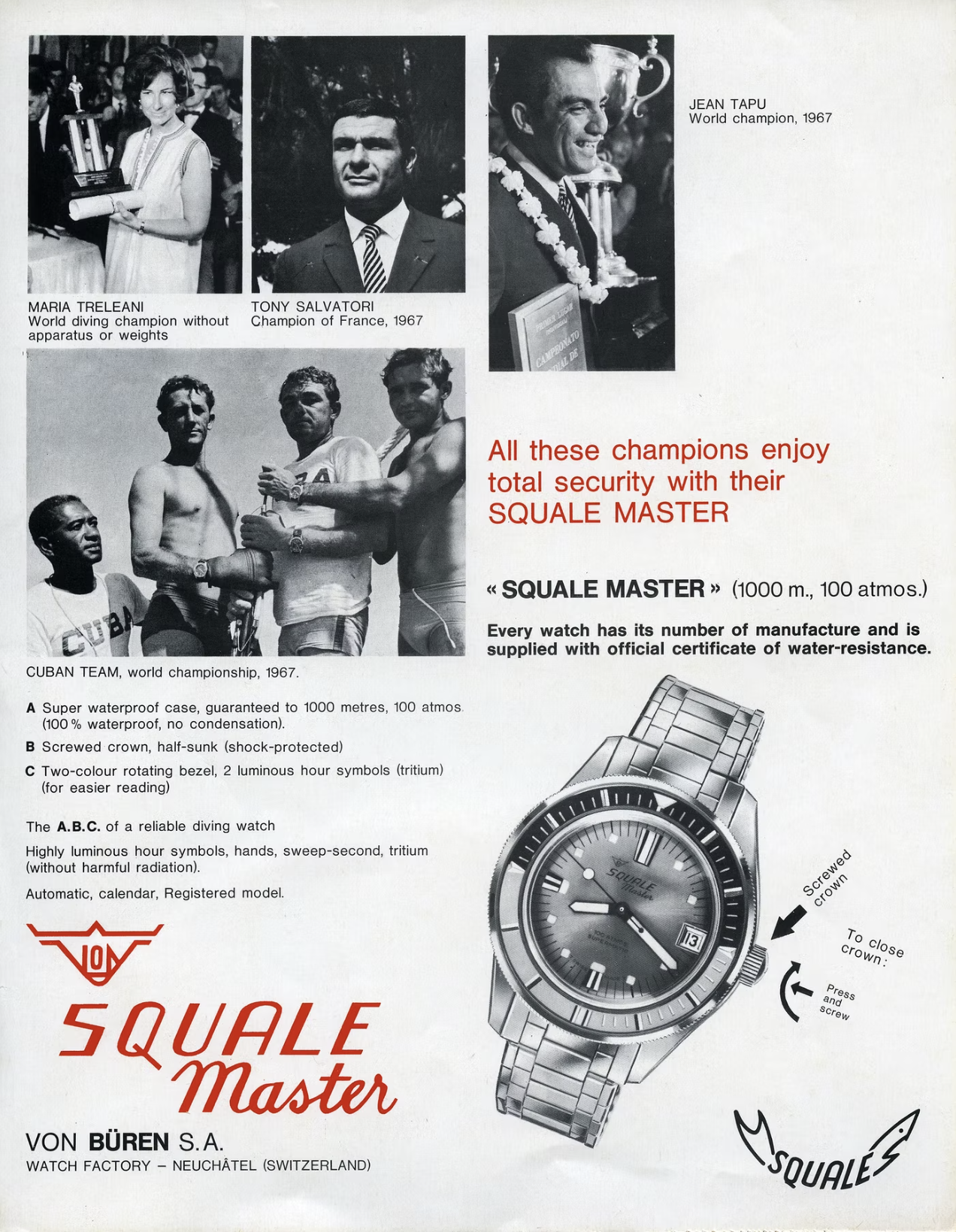
An early Squale advertisement

As early as 1948, Charles von Büren began assembling watches under his name. Years later, in 1959, von Büren registered the Squale trademark in Neuchâtel, Switzerland.

During the 1960s and 1970s, Squale provided cases for Altanus Genève, Arlon, Potens Prima, Prima Flic, Jean Perret Geneva, Ocean Diver / Blandford, Deman Watch, Margi, Berio, Eagle Star Genève, La Spirotechnique, Wertex, Carlson Tavernier Geneva, and Sinn. Cases designed for 500m water resistance with the crown located at the 4 o'clock position were sold to Airin, Dodane, Blancpain, Tag Heuer, Doxa, Zeno, and Auricoste. Squale also supplied the Folgore Parachute Brigade, part of the Italian Air Force, and the Italian Navy's Diving Corps with timepieces during this period.

In 1974, Squale entered the watch market as an independent entity.

In 1989, following the watch industry's "quartz crisis," Squale halted their production of mechanical watches in order to focus on quartz timepieces. This led to the creation of the "Squale Rambo." Like many watch companies at the time, Squale began to fade from the international watch market.

After the retirement of Charles von Büren, the Maggi families and the former Italian distributors of von Büren watches partnered with one another.

The brand relaunched in 2010 with its headquarters in Milan and watchmaking being done in Chiasso, Switzerland.

In 2020, Squale moved its headquarters entirely to Chiasso, Switzerland.

== Name and logo ==
Squale is a French word for shark. The E is silent and it is pronounced "Skwal." In 1946, Charles von Büren created C.Von Büren SA in Neuchâtel, Switzerland. In 1959, after testing the reliability of the watch cases himself on numerous occasion, he registered the Squale trademark. Squale is now based in Chiasso and is in partnership with the Maggi family from Italy.

== Notable owners ==
- Jackie Chan wore a Squale Rambo during the 1987 film Armour of God.
- The 1967 national Cuban Diving Team.
- James Marsden has been seen wearing a Squale 50 Atmos Ref. 1521-026A
- Jacques Mayol broke the world record for breath-hold deep diving on numerous occasions while wearing Squale watches.
- Tony Salvatori, 1967 French champion spearfisher
- Jean Tapu, world champion diver, 1967
- Maria "Jolly" Treleani, world record breaking deep diver (triple world champion of apnea, 1965, 1966 and 1967)

== Watch Models ==
Current models:

- 1521 Collection
- 1545 Collection
- 2001 Collection
- 2002 Collection
- Drass S.A.V.E.R.
- Master Collection
- Matic Collection
- SUB-39 Collection
- SUB-37 Legend
- Super Squale Collection
- T-183 Collection

Previous models:

- Squale Rambo
- Tiger Collection
