= Christian Jacques =

Swiss watch brand

- Industry: Watch manufacturing
- Founded: 1988 by Christian Bach & Jacques Geeraerts
- Headquarters: Basel, Switzerland
- Products: Wristwatches
- Website: www.christian-jacques.com

Christian Jacques is a Swiss brand of watches based in Basel (Switzerland). Christian Jacques is also one of the last independent brands in the Swiss watch industry.

== History ==
Founded in 1988 by Christian Bach and Jacques Geeraerts, the brand Christian Jacques has expanded significantly since 1995.

Christian Jacques produces timepieces in Switzerland, under the Swiss Made label. Their watches are available on many markets such as Switzerland, the European Union, Russia, Ukraine, Azerbaijan, the United Arab Emirates, Qatar, the Arab states of the Persian Gulf. Hong Kong, People's Republic of China, Macao and Singapore more recently.

== Watch Models ==
Their range goes from stainless steel quartz models to exclusive limited editions in solid rose gold (18k) with automatic Valjoux movements, and other refined timepieces with set diamonds, high-tech ceramics, carbon fibers and other noble materials.

Christian Jacques releases one or two new models per year, on top of its already short series, limited editions and various models and versions with own original designs.

Men collection:

- Aviator
- Cubus
- Explorator
- Magister
- Magnus
- Oceanus
- Virtus

Ladies collection:

- Ceramica
- Ignis
- Stella

Limited Edition:

- Eos / 50 pcs
- Ceramagna / 20 pcs
