= Hanowa =

Swiss watch brand

Hanowa AG
- Company type: Public
- Industry: Watch manufacturing
- Founded: 1963, in Biel/Bienne
- Founder: Hans Noll; Elisabeth Noll-Wirz
- Headquarters: Möhlin, Switzerland
- Area served: Worldwide
- Key people: Paris C. Brown (CEO)
- Products: Wristwatches
- Services: Timing systems
- Parent: ILG - International Luxury Group
- Website: www.hanowa.ch

Hanowa and Swiss Military – Hanowa are brands of Hanowa Aktiengesellschaft (AG)/Ltd. Möhlin, Switzerland, which designs and makes timepieces, particularly wristwatches. The company's name is an acronym for HAns NOll WAtches, a clear reference to the founder of the company. The hallmark on the watches is an octagon containing a Swiss flag.

== History ==
The company was established in 1963 by Hans Noll and his wife Elisabeth Wirz, two years after taking over a watch factory sales management in Biel, Switzerland. In 1990, a second brand, Swiss Military—Hanowa, was established. While Hanowa was founded in Biel, Swiss Military—Hanowa is based in Möhlin. Hong Kong–based Fortune Concept Ltd. became the company to distribute the brand Swiss Military—Hanowa in Asia.

Since 2015 Hanowa is an official licensee of the Swiss Confederation, which allows the company to commercialize their product using the "Swiss Military" name which is owned by the Swiss government. As of 2018, Hanowa AG is led by CEO Paris C. Brown. The company distributes its watches in over 60 countries.
