= Raymond Weil =

Swiss luxury watchmaker

Raymond Weil Genève SA
- Type: Private
- Industry: Watchmaking
- Founded: 1976; 50 years ago
- Founder: Raymond Weil
- Headquarters: Geneva, Switzerland
- Area served: Worldwide
- Key people: Elie Bernheim (CEO); Olivier Bernheim (President)
- Products: Wristwatches
- Website: raymond-weil.com

Raymond Weil Genève SA (French pronunciation: [ʁemɔ̃ vɛːj]) is a Swiss luxury watchmaker founded in 1976 in Geneva by Raymond Weil and Simone Bédat. Simone Bedat and her son left the company in 1996 to form Bedat & Co.

Weil led the company until his retirement in 2002; he died in 2014. Weil's grandson, Elie Bernheim, has been the CEO since 2014.

== History ==
Weil initially sold his designs from a foldout bridge table in a stall in Geneva. The line included both the traditional spring-powered and cog-and-gear mechanical watches, as well as quartz-powered ones. He marketed the watches internationally towards lower-end luxury watch buyers.

In July 2018, the company moved its UK head office into St Peter’s Square in Manchester.

In 2023, the brand experienced a resurgence, with its latest model, the Millesime Small Seconds, winning the Challenge Prize at the Grand Prix de l’Horlogerie de Genève (GPHG) Awards, often referred to as the "Oscars" of the watchmaking world.

== See also ==
- Sellita
- Favre-Leuba
