= Chronoswiss =

Swiss watch manufacturer

Chronoswiss AG
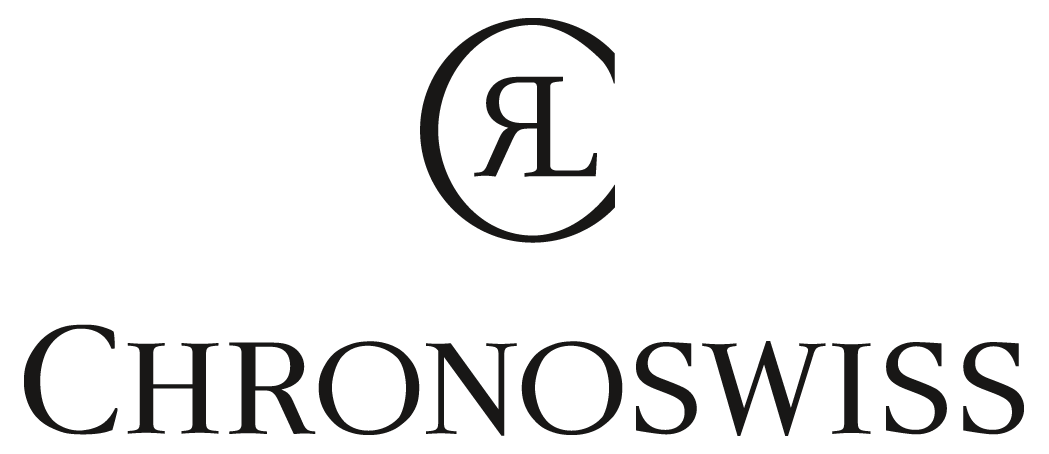
- Type: Private
- Industry: Watchmaking; licensing
- Predecessor: Chronoswiss AG
- Founded: München, Germany (1983)
- Founder: Gerd Rüdiger Lang
- Headquarters: Lucerne, Switzerland
- Area served: Worldwide
- Key people: Oliver Ebstein
- Products: Mechanical watches
- Number of employees: 30
- Website: chronoswiss.com

Chronoswiss is a Swiss watch manufacturer based in Lucerne. The company was founded by Gerd R. Lang in 1983 to make mechanical timepieces. Prior to founding Chronoswiss, Lang had gained significant experience in manufacturing movements for other major brands. The watches use bought-in movements. Chronoswiss produces about 7,000 watches per year. All watches are hand-finished. While many of the movements used in Chronoswiss watches are based on the Enicar 165 movement, the Chronoswiss versions feature significant improvements, both technical and aesthetic.

As a brand valued mostly by collectors, Chronoswiss watches generally sell at the low end of their price range at auctions.

In 2012, Swiss entrepreneur Oliver Ebstein, and his wife Eva bought and took over the management of Chronoswiss. The headquarters are located at Lucerne, Switzerland, and open to visitors.

Gallery

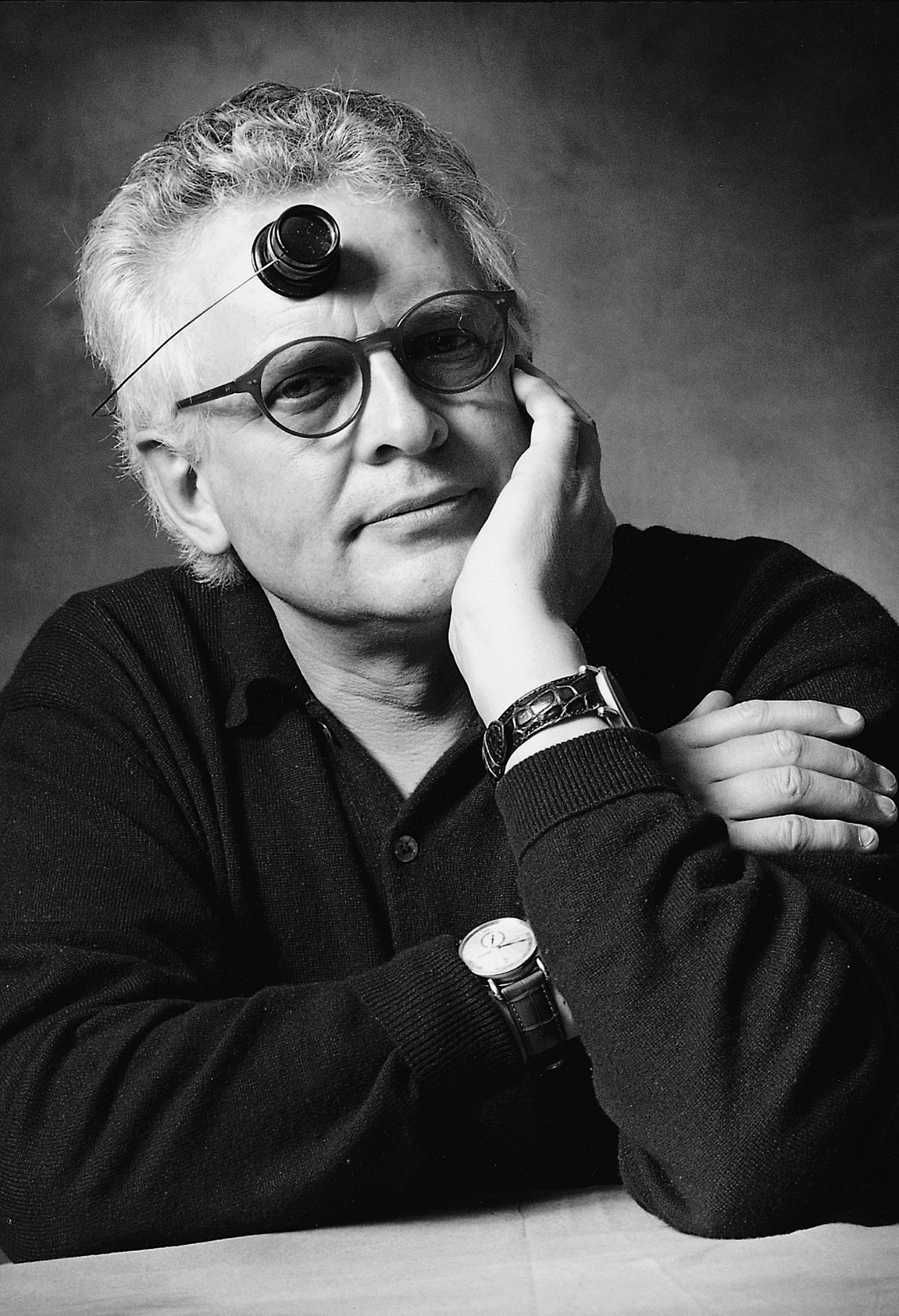
Gerd R. Lang in 1998

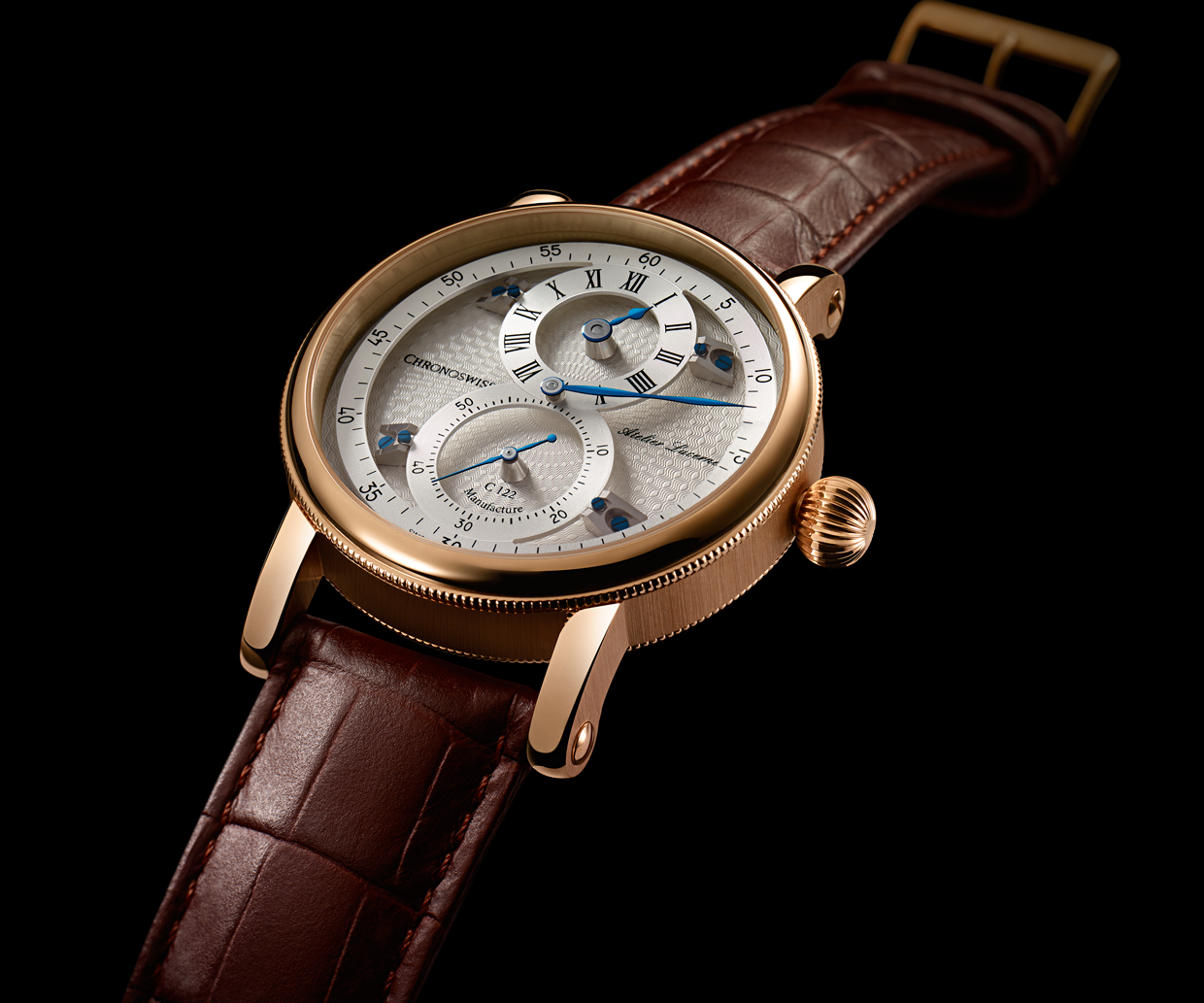
In 2016, Chronoswiss presented the concept of the "Flying Regulator" with its characteristic 3 D dial construction

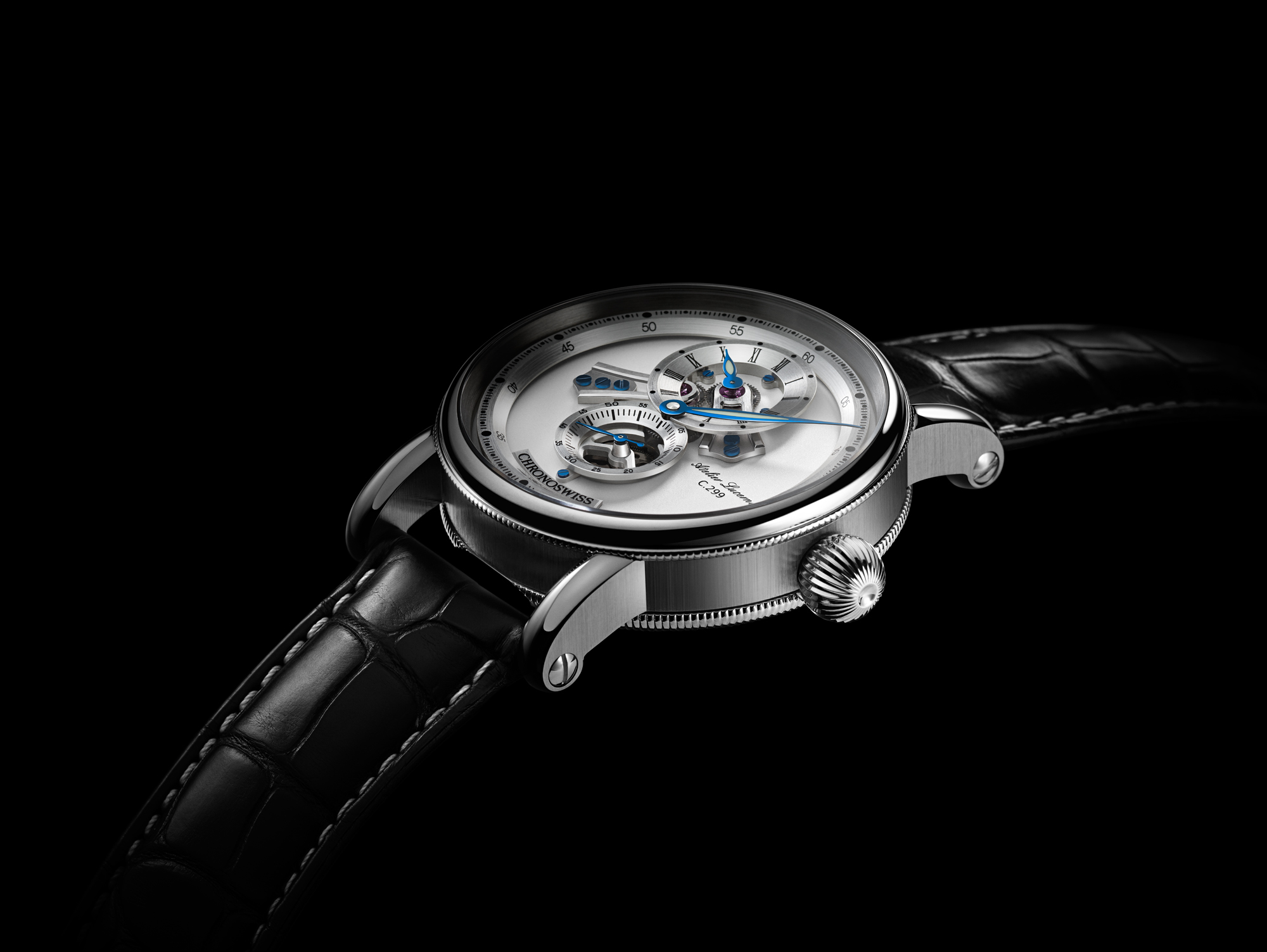
Flying Regulator Open Gear
