= Bedat & Co =

Swiss watch brand

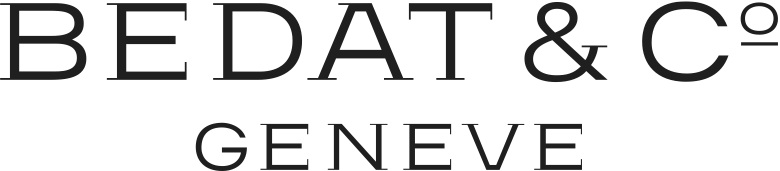
- Type: Private Limited Company
- Industry: Luxury Watch Manufacturing
- Founded: 1996; 30 years ago
- Founder: Simone Bédat Christian Bédat
- Headquarters: Geneva, Switzerland
- Products: Wristwatches
- Website: www.bedat.com

Bedat & Co is a Swiss watch brand, specialising in women's watches. The company was founded by Simone Bédat and her son Christian Bédat.

Bedat & Co is owned by Luxury Concepts, a Malaysian firm.

== History ==
Simone Bédat and her son Christian Bédat departed from the luxury Swiss watch brand Raymond Weil to create their own brand, Bedat, in 1996. The first collection of timepieces, the N°3, N°7., and Ref. 304, were presented in 1997 during BaselWorld.

In 2000, Gucci Group acquired 85% of Bedat & Co with Christian Bédat as the chairman. Simone Bedat helped her son Pro bono and was never an employee of the company. The watches in 2000 cost on average $5,000. In 2005, Gucci became sole owner of Bedat & Co after purchasing the remaining 15% of the company.

In 2006, Simone and Christian Bédat left the company. In 2008, the brand launched its first stand-alone boutique in Kuala Lumpur, officiated by Sultanah Nur Zahirah, the Raja Permaisuri Agong.

In 2009, Malaysia-based company Luxury Concepts acquired Bedat & Co and kept it a Swiss watch brand with global distribution. In 2010, Bedat & Co worked again with the designer Dino Modolo for the latest collection.
