= Richmont Graduate University =

US private Christian university

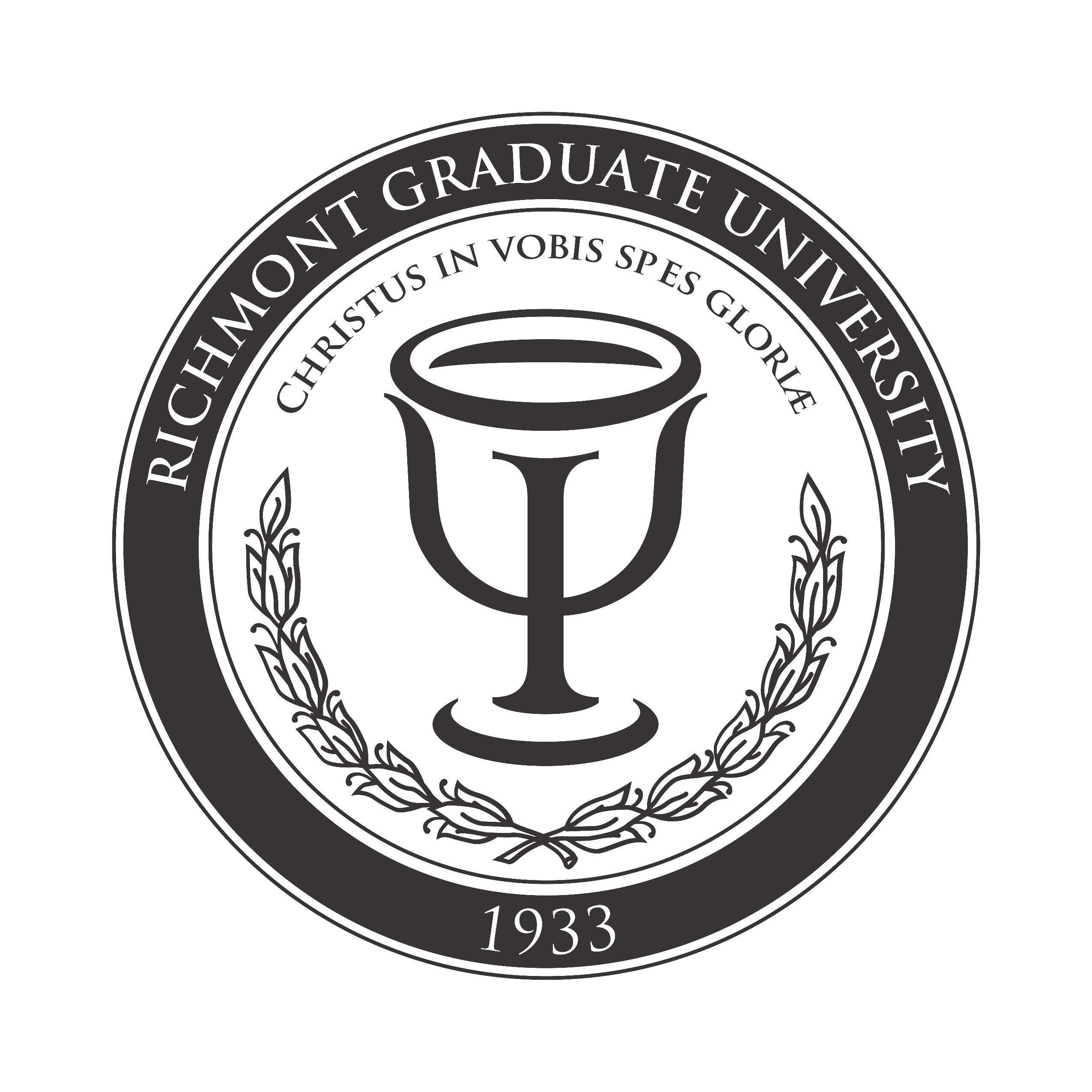
- Former names: Psychological Studies Institute, Chattanooga Bible Institute
- Motto: Christus In Vobis Spes Gloriae
- Motto in English: Christ In You The Hope Of Glory
- Type: Private, Graduate School
- Established: 1933
- Parent institution: Chattanooga Bible Institute and Psycholocial Studies Institute
- Religious affiliation: Non-denominational
- President: Timothy W. Quinnan
- Postgraduates: 280
- Location: Chattanooga, Tennessee and Atlanta, Georgia, US
- Website: www.richmont.edu

Richmont Graduate University is a private Christian university with campuses in Chattanooga, Tennessee, and Atlanta, Georgia, United States. It offers Master's degrees and it does so through its School of Counseling and School of Ministry. Richmont's most popular programs include its Master of Arts in Clinical Mental Health Counseling (CACREP accredited) and its Master of Arts in Ministry.

Richmont Graduate University also offers community counseling services through its network of ten counseling centers located in Atlanta, Georgia and Chattanooga, Tennessee.

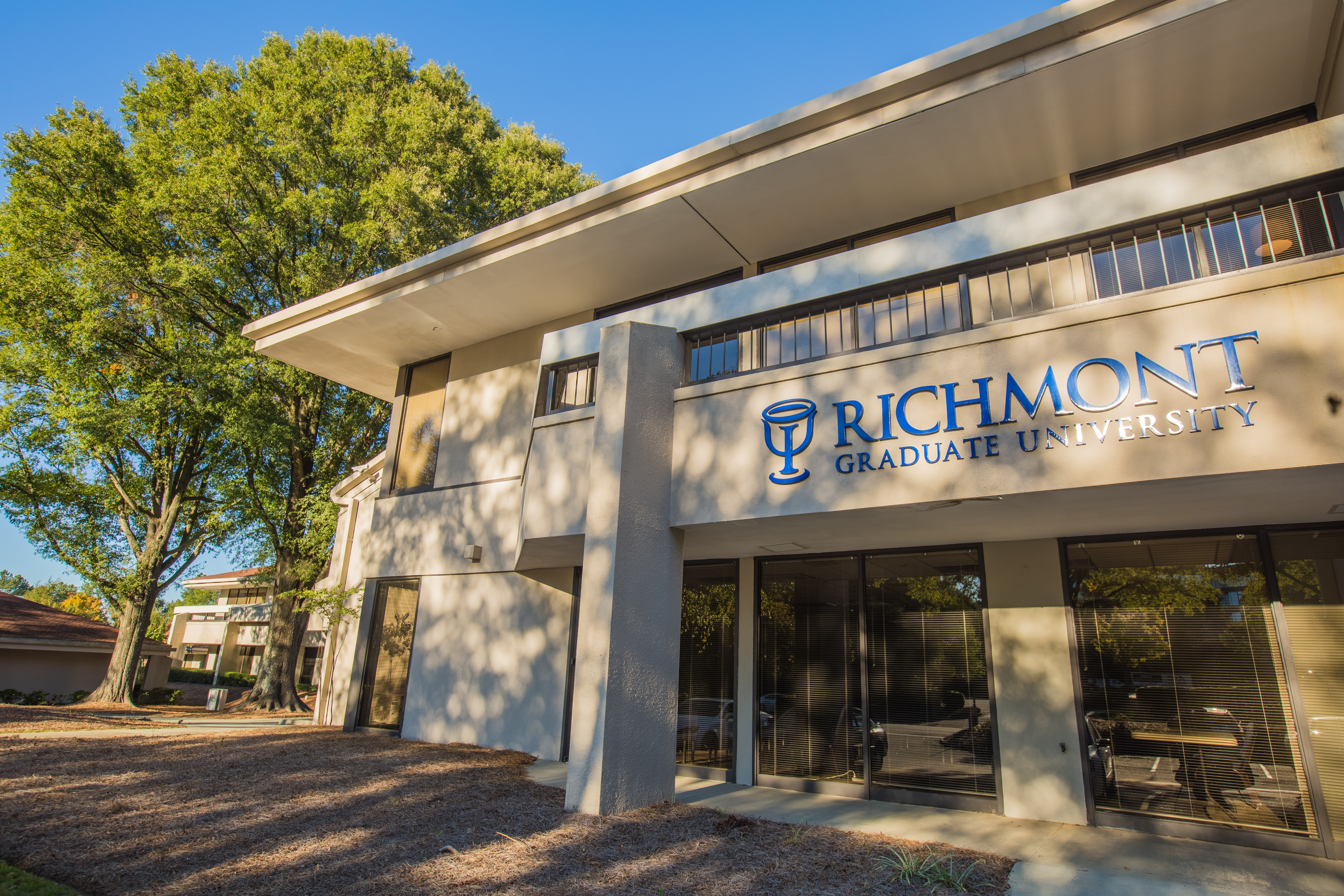
Richmont Graduate University, Atlanta Campus

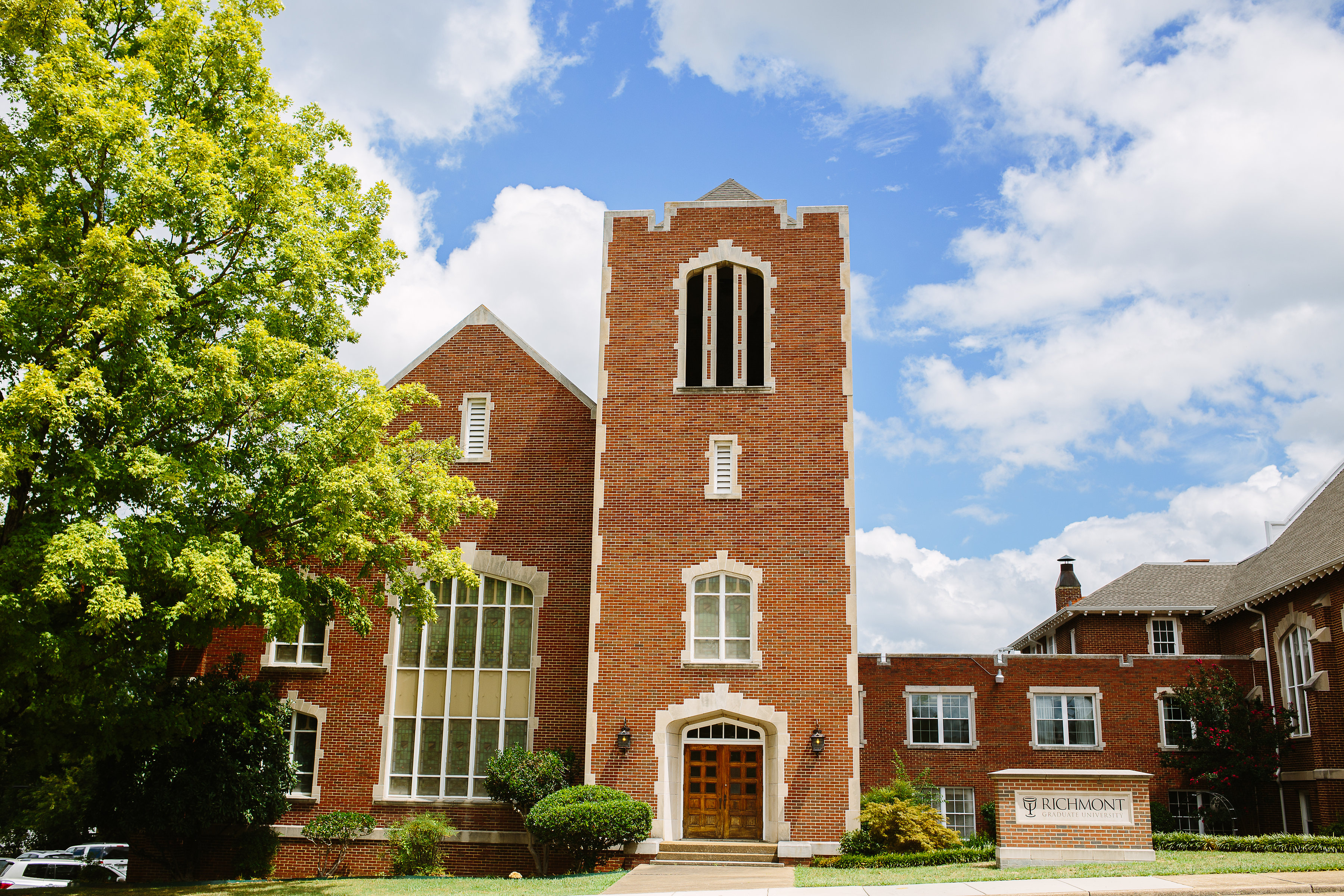
Richmont Graduate University, Chattanooga Campus

== History ==
Richmont was formalized in 2000 when the Chattanooga Bible Institute (CBI, est. 1933) merged with the Psychological Studies Institute (PSI, est. 1973) in 2003. Only three years after the merger, Richmont received accreditation from the Southern Association of Colleges and Schools Commission on Colleges (SACSCOC). Each year, approximately 70 new counselors and ministers graduate from Richmont. In 2016 Richmont's Clinical Mental Health Program received accreditation from the Council on Accrediting Counseling Related Education Programs (CACREP).

=== Presidents ===
- Donald G Miles (1979–1978)*
- Edward G Groesbeck (1978–1980)*
- Stephen Youngblood (1980–1981)*
- Paul Mauger (1981–1984)*
- James L Powell (1984–1992)*
- Donald S Aultman (1992–1998)*
- Gary W Moon (1998–2000)*
- Henry A Henegar (2000–2002)*
- C Jeffrey Terrell (2003–2012)
- Robert G "Bob" Rodgers (2013–2016)
- Timothy W Quinnan (2017–present)

* denotes president of Psychological Studies Institute

== Academics ==
=== Graduate Degrees ===
Richmont students can pursue master's degrees in: Clinical Mental Health Counseling (CACREP accredited), Ministry, Spiritual Formation and Direction, and Psychological Studies. Counseling students also have the option of pursuing a graduate certificate in marriage and family therapy, addictions, child and adolescent therapy, sex therapy, spirituality and counseling, and trauma counseling. Richmont offers day, evening, and weekend intensive courses as well as several online options for study.

Prior to graduation, counseling students are required to complete an official practicum and internship. Like a medical residency, insured student interns begin practicing as therapists while under licensed supervision. Students complete their internships through Richmont's network of nine Community Counseling Centers. Students also provide outplacement professional counseling services to local nonprofits located in 18+ counties throughout metro Atlanta.

=== Accreditation ===
Richmont Graduate University is accredited by the Southern Association of Colleges and Schools Commission on Colleges to award the master's degree. Richmont Graduate University is authorized by the Georgia Nonpublic Postsecondary Education Commission and the Tennessee Higher Education Commission. This authorization is renewed annually based on an evaluation of minimum standards concerning the quality of education, ethical business practices, health and safety, and fiscal responsibility.

Richmont Graduate University's Master of Arts in Clinical Mental Health Counseling (MACMHC) program is accredited by the Council for Accreditation of Counseling and Related Educational Programs.

== Counseling services ==
Richmont hosts ten Community Counseling Centers throughout the Southeast to provide mental health services for clients including the Henegar Counseling Center in Chattanooga, Tennessee and the Hope Counseling Centers in Atlanta, Georgia. Each Richmont Counseling Center utilizes licensed mental health professionals, masters' level clinicians, and insured counseling interns. Staff members are ethnically and linguistically diverse. All licensed team members carry full client caseloads offering individual and group therapy. Some of the most utilized counseling services include: child and adolescent therapy, Trauma-Focused Cognitive-Behavioral Therapy (TF-CBT), DBT, depression/anxiety counseling, grief/loss counseling, marital counseling, posttraumatic stress disorder counseling, self-esteem/body image counseling, etc.

The university also partners with more than 60 agencies throughout metro Atlanta who utilize Richmont interns to offer on-site counseling services to their constituents. Some of Richmont's existing partners include: Atlanta Center for Eating Disorders, Atlanta Mission, CitySide Healthcare, City of Refuge, Devereux Georgia Treatment Network, Good Samaritan Health Center, MARR Men's Center, Peachford Behavioral Health, Ridgeview Institute, Wellspring Living, and more.

== Richmont Institute of Trauma and Recovery ==
The Richmont Institute of Trauma and Recovery was formed in 2016 and offers training and resources to professionals seeking specialized training in trauma, clinicians and first responders experiencing compassion fatigue, and help for individuals who have been victims of traumatization. The Richmont Institute of Trauma and Recovery offers a Graduate Certificate in Trauma through Richmont Graduate University and also offers training and certification through the Green Cross Academy of Traumatology.

Richmont Trauma Response Teams are trained and available to meet acute trauma disasters locally, nationally, and globally. Richmont Trauma teams have been dispatched to assist with traumatic events, natural disasters, and training under served populations. Recent trauma trips include Greece (refugee crisis), Charlottesville (race riots), Houston (Hurricane Harvey), Puerto Rico (Hurricane Maria), and Uganda (trauma counseling training).

== Memberships ==
Richmont Graduate University is a member of the Evangelical Council for Financial Accountability. ECFA is committed to helping Christ-centered organizations earn the public's trust through developing and maintaining standards of accountability that convey God-honoring ethical practices.
