= Damiani Group =

Italian luxury jewelry corporate group

Coordinates: 45.008618°N 8.638025°E

Damiani S.p.A.
- Type: Joint-stock company
- Traded as: BIT: DMN
- Industry: Jewellers
- Founded: 1924; 102 years ago, in Valenza, Italy
- Founder: Enrico Grassi Damiani
- Headquarters: Valenza, Italy
- Number of locations: 52 directly operated stores (30 June 2013)
- Area served: World wide
- Key people: Guido Grassi Damiani, CEO
- Products: Jewelry
- Total equity: 104,779,284 (2014)
- Number of employees: 567 (2014)
- Parent: Leading Jewels S.A.
- Subsidiaries: Rocca S.p.A.(2008)
- Website: www.damiani.com

Damiani S.p.A (or Damiani Group) is an Italian luxury jewelry corporate group that designs, manufactures, distributes and sells jewelry and luxury watches. It was founded in Italy in 1924. The company uses celebrity endorsements to market its products. In the early 2000s the company had a dispute with Brad Pitt and Jennifer Aniston regarding the use of their names and wedding ring designs. The dispute was settled for $50 million and the couple helped Damiani create and market a line of products. Damiani expanded across Asia and the US. It went public in 2007 and its most well-known jewelry product brands are Calderoni, Salvini, Alfieri & St. John and Bliss.

== History ==
Damiani was founded in 1924 by Enrico Grassi Damiani, in Valenza, Italy. It became popular among affluent Italians. Damiani's son led the company from 1960-1990. It started selling products on the US market in 2001 and introduced a $2.5 million ad campaign the following year.

Damiani experienced negative press after Brad Pitt and Jennifer Aniston filed a lawsuit. They said Damiani was selling reproductions of the ring custom-designed by Brad Pitt and made exclusively for their wedding in violation of their agreement with Damiani. Damiani said they never made that agreement and that the rings were merely chosen from a collection of wedding rings. A settlement was reached for $50 million in January 2002. As part of the settlement, Mr Pitt designed a ring for Damiani, which Aniston would model in its advertisements for it.

By 2003 it had 25 stores which each sold a single brand of products, in Italy, Asia and the US.

In 2007, Damiani announced an initial public offering, which valued the company at €150.8 million (USD215.4 million) (in 2007 exchange rates). Rocca S.p.A., an Italian jewelry and watch retailer, was purchased by Damiani for €7 million (US$9.81 million) in 2008

In 2010, Damiani had a net loss of €18.2 million (USD25.6 million). The company's estimated total sales (in 2010/2011) were €150 million. In 2010, Birks & Mayors agreed to distribute all Damiani Group's brands, for five years, in the United States. In 2012, Damiani entered into a partnership with MingFung/Hengdeli Group to distribute its watches and jewelry in China. Also, in 2012, Damiani received permission by the Government of India to invest in the Indian jewelry market.

As of November 2012, Damiani had an annual revenue of €151.6 million (USD193.3 million). In the fiscal year ending March 2013, Damiani S.P.A. had sales of €137.82 million (USD185.75 million) Currently, Damiani is run by the third generation of the Damiani family, that has been on the board of directors since 1996.

In 2012, the company became the first jeweler to obtain the authorization to hold a 51% controlling interest in an Indian-based entity, Damiani India. In November 2013, Damiani raised funds for the Italian Red Cross to support people affected by the storms in Sardinia by donating 20 percent of certain sales in Damiani’s flagship stores in Italy and watch retailer Rocca.

The President Guido Damiani received the America Award of the Italy-USA Foundation in 2013.

In December 2018, Leading Jewels, the holding company of Damianis, announced it will buy Casa Damiani's shares for 11.8 million euros total, in order to delist it from the Milan bourse. The same year, the brand announced a partnership with the Rossoneri becoming AC Milan's "luxury partner".

In January 2019, the company launched a takeover bid for delisting from the Stock Exchange: since its debut it has lost more than 75% of its value.

In March 2019 the company returns to being family-owned after having exceeded 96% of ownership of the shares with an offer of € 0.855 per share and the consequent delisting after the bidder has exercised the right to purchase.

=== Centenary celebration ===
On March 14, 2024 the company celebrates 100 years since its foundation, with a special gala with Sophia Loren and Jessica Chastain at the Alcione Theater in Milan. Alessandra Mastronardi, Bebe Vio and Matteo Bocelli, son of Andrea Bocelli, are also present among the guests. From 19 March 2024 to 28 April 2024, an exhibition 100x100 Italiani has been scheduled at the Gallerie d'Italia in Milan where it will exhibit 100 exclusive pieces for the centenary celebration.

== Brands ==
Damiani designs and markets jewelry and watches, as well as jewels and unique pieces. The company's major market is in Italy. It is sold in other major markets worldwide through subsidiaries and boutiques. It has won 18 consecutive Diamonds International Awards.

All Damiani suppliers are part of a restricted circle of selected organizations respecting UN regulations on the certification and origin of conflict-free diamonds. There are 35 retail boutiques and 19 other franchises such as jewelry stores.

The main brands of Damiani are:

- Salvini
- Alfieri & St. John
- Bliss (which is distributed, in Japan, by BGioielli Ltd.)
- Calderoni

== Marketing ==
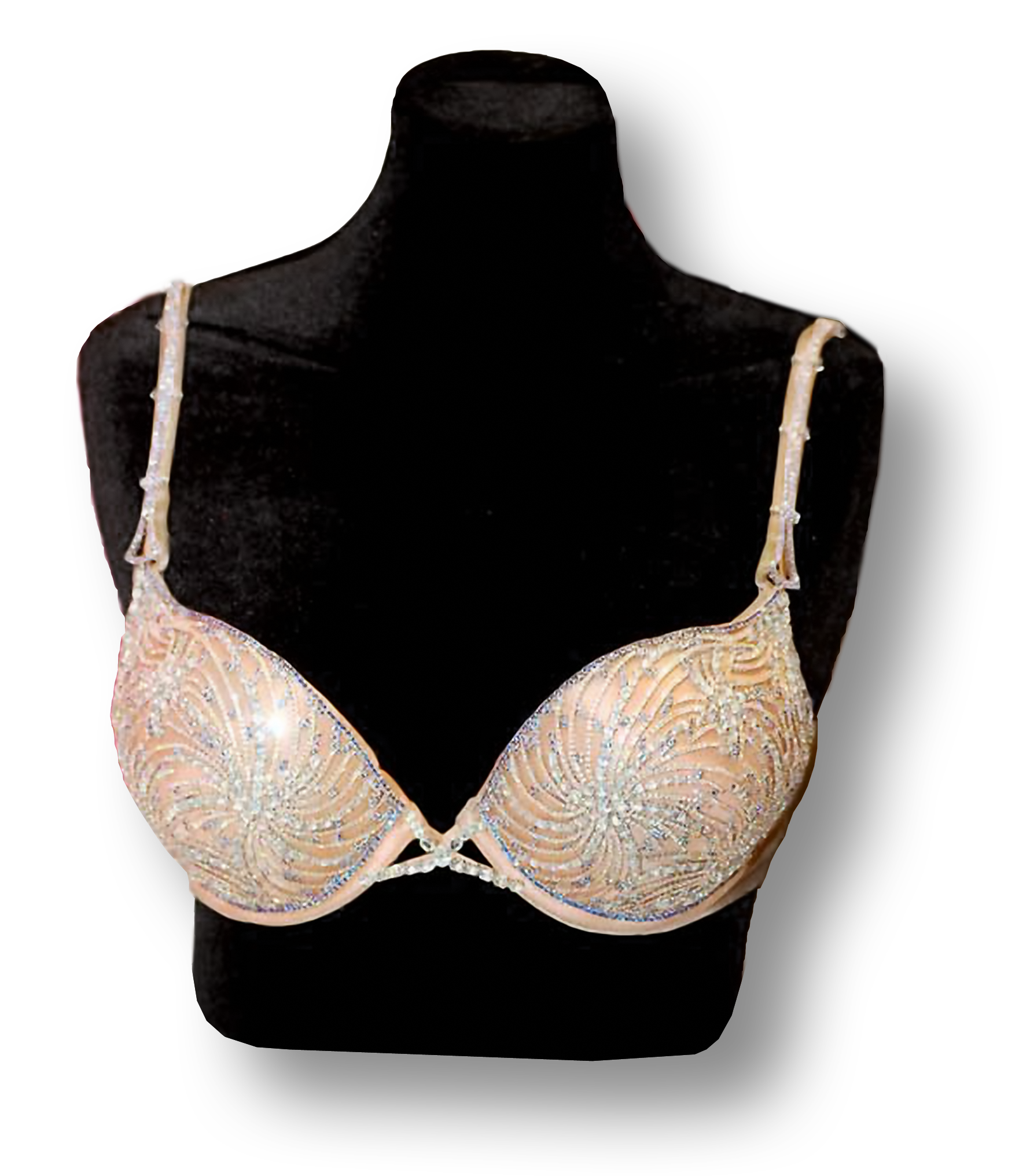
A $2 million Fantasy Bra designed by Damiani

Damiani collaborates with celebrities like Isabella Rossellini, Brad Pitt and Jennifer Aniston to promote their products. Gwyneth Paltrow was featured in its ads in 2004.

Damiani created the "Aro Necklace, which Aro, a leader of the Volturi ruling vampire clan," in the Twilight movie, The Twilight Saga: Breaking Dawn – Part 2, gives to Bella Swan. It also created the 2009 Harlequin Fantasy Bra, worn by model Marisa Miller during the Victoria’s Secret Fashion Show. The bra has an 18k gold frame with 2,355 colorless and cognac diamonds, with a focal point of a 16-carat, champagne-color, heart-shape diamond, for a total of nearly 150 carats total weight.

Damiani has a tradition of collaborating with celebrities to create unique, high-profile pieces. For example, Giorgio Damiani, inspired by the film Burlesque starring Christina Aguilera and Cher, worked with designer Christina Bagnari to create a special collection. One of the standout designs, a bracelet inspired by the film's costumes, featured a clasp that mimics the closure of a corset. This bracelet was worn by Sharon Stone during a press event for the reopening of Damiani's Milan boutique.
