= Baume et Mercier =

Swiss luxury watchmaker

Baume & Mercier
- Type: Subsidiary
- Industry: Watchmaking
- Founded: 1830 (as Frères Baume); 1918 (as Baume & Mercier)
- Headquarters: Geneva, Switzerland
- Key people: Michael Guenoun (CEO)
- Products: Watches; jewellery
- Parent: Damiani Group
- Website: baume-et-mercier.com

Baume & Mercier (French pronunciation: [bɔm ˈe mer-sjej]) is a Swiss luxury watchmaker with origins dating back to 1830. It was a subsidiary of the Swiss luxury conglomerate Richemont until Richemont sold Baume & Mercier to Italy’s Damiani Group in 2026.

== History ==
Baume & Mercier was originally founded as "Frères Baume" in 1830 by brothers Louis-Victor and Célestin Baume, who opened a watch dealership in Les Bois, a village in the Swiss Jura. The business established a branch in London in 1851 under the name "Baume Brothers", which led to expansion throughout the British Empire. By the late 19th century, the firm had an international reputation, with its timepieces setting accuracy records and winning a number of timekeeping competitions.

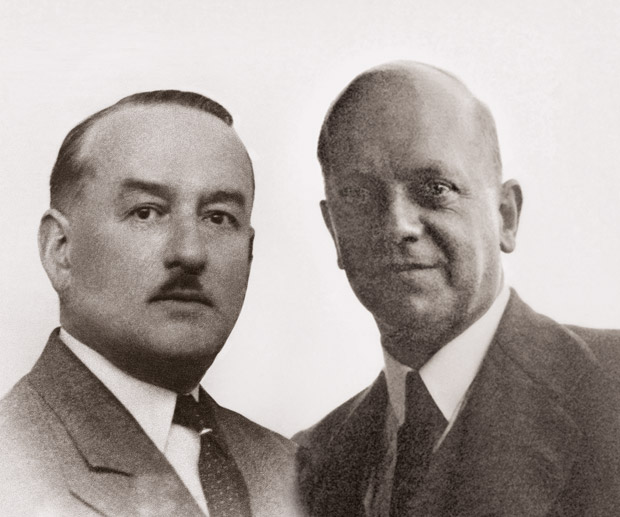
Paul Mercier and William Baume

In 1918, company director William Baume partnered with Paul Mercier to found "Baume & Mercier" in Geneva. The company became specialized in manufacturing wristwatches, particularly models in unconventional shapes. In 1919, Baume & Mercier was awarded the Geneva Seal, the highest international distinction of the time for watchmaking excellence.

During the Roaring Twenties, the brand embraced women's emancipation. In the 1940s, Baume & Mercier launched a number of modern watch collections, most notably the 2 Register Chronograph. Early examples of this model with the double-caseback are rare and highly sought after, often fetching more than double the price of a later model.

In the 1970s, Baume & Mercier introduced shaped timepieces such as the Galaxie and Stardust models. In 1973, Baume & Mercier presented the Riviera, one of the world's first steel sports watches.

=== Recent history ===
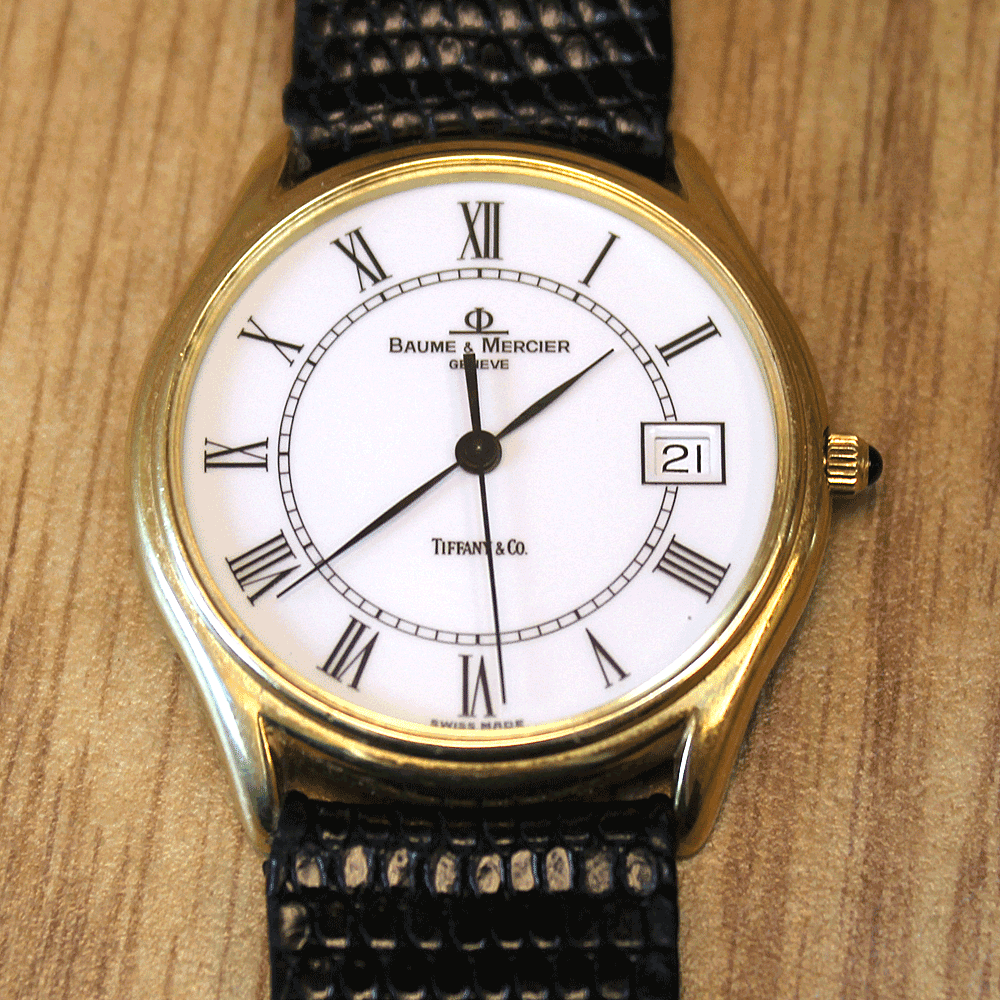
Baume & Mercier ref. 95248 Classima Tiffany & Co. 18k Men's quartz watch

In 1988, the Swiss watchmaker joined the Richemont group. Currently, the brand offers the Clifton, Classima and Hampton collections for both men and women, the Capeland collection for men, and the Linea and Promesse collections for women. In 2015, Baume & Mercier bolstered its sports watch offerings by entering into a partnership with the celebrated American race carmaker Carroll Shelby International. In 2016 the company sold "Shelby Cobra" models, named for the sports car, in its Capeland and Clifton collections.

==== Baume ====
The short-lived, downmarket Baume brand was launched on May 15, 2018. Baume watches were sold exclusively online and assembled in Amsterdam. The brand used Ronda and Miyota movements.

== Pricing ==
With an average selling price of between US$2,000 and US$7,000, Baume & Mercier watches are in the lower-range of the luxury watch market.

In 2016, Baume & Mercier began to present more affordable offerings under US$1,000 with the launch of its "My Classima" models, a sub-collection of its Classima collection of classic dress watches.

Baumatic movement

== Baumatic Movement ==
Baume & Mercier released their own proprietary movement, known as the "Baumatic Movement". Developed by Richemont’s Manufacture Horlogère ValFleurier, this movement is leading class for its price. This automatic calibre features the innovative Powerscape escapement and Twinspir silicon hairspring, enhancing both energy efficiency and resistance to magnetism. Furthermore, it includes a 120 hour power reserve and an accuracy of -4/+6 seconds-per-day. The movement also includes silicon components and optimized lubricants which minimize friction and wear; reducing the need for frequent servicing.

== See also ==
- Swiss watch brands
- Watch manufacturing companies of Switzerland
