= Catorex =

Swiss watch maker

Cattin & Cie SA, Montres CATOREX
- Type: Private
- Industry: Watchmaking
- Founded: 1858
- Founder: Constant Cattin
- Headquarters: Les Breuleux, Switzerland
- Area served: Worldwide
- Products: Watches
- Owner: Guy Albert Cattin

Cattin & Cie SA, Montres CATOREX is a Swiss watch manufacturer founded in 1858 by Constant Cattin, in Les Breuleux, Switzerland.

== History ==
In the early 19th century, farmer Georges Ignace Cattin (born 1785) started manufacturing pocket watches with Cabinotiers in the canton of Jura, Switzerland. Cattin became the first of six generations of watchmakers. His son, Constant Cattin (born in 1818), founded Cattin & Cie SA in 1858 in Les Breuleux, where the company is based today.

The company was then owned by Numa Cattin (born in 1861) Armand and Maurice Cattin (born in 1885 and 1887 respectively), and Guy Cattin (born in 1932). Guy Albert Cattin is the current owner of Cattin & Cie SA.

CATOREX was created and registered as a trademark in 1957 by Guy Cattin. In 1979, CATOREX developed the smallest ever skeleton watch and, in 1985, the world's smallest pendant watch. The company has since extended its product range to include clothing, bags, glasses, and jewellery.
