= Zeno-Watch Basel =

Swiss watchmaker

ZENO-WATCH BASEL Patrik-Philipp Huber SA
- Type: Private
- Industry: Luxury goods, Watch manufacturer
- Founded: 1868
- Founder: Jules Godat
- Headquarters: Basel, Switzerland
- Key people: Felix W. Huber
- Products: Watches
- Owner: Huber Family
- Number of employees: 26
- Website: www.zeno-watch.ch

Zeno Nostalgia

Zeno-Watch is a Swiss watchmaker established in 1868, though the Zeno name has been in use only since 1922. They are an entry-level Swiss brand, using an ETA movement for their mechanical watches. Specializing in aviation watches, they are one of the few independent Swiss watch manufacturers still in operation. Their factory is based in Basel, Switzerland.

The company is legally registered as Zeno-Watch Patrik-Philipp Huber SA and remains under the ownership and management of the Huber family, with Felix W. Huber having led the company since the mid-1960s and Patrik-Philipp Huber involved in management

== History ==
=== Beginnings ===
Zeno's history began in 1868 with watchmaker Jules Godat, the founder of a small pocket watch manufacturing company (Godat & Co.) in La Chaux-de-Fonds, in the heart of the Swiss watchmaking industry. He produced fine pocket watches featuring solid silver cases and lady pendant watches in very small quantities. He built a small factory, which was taken over in 1920 by A. Eigeldinger & Fils.

Eigeldinger specialized in creating wrist watches for the army. They produced watches in stainless steel, silver, gold and platinum, with mechanical movements up to 43 mm. Their registered brands were Zeno, Strand and Solvex. In 1922 André-Charles Eigeldinger, the son of the owner, registered the watch brand ZENO. The name (short form of Zenodopolus) goes back to the two Greek philosophers Zeno and means “gift of Zeus” or “divine gift”.

=== The first Zeno watches ===
The first Zeno watches were made in 1922 with each piece marked with a Swiss cross on the back of the casing. In 1949, Zeno watches were exhibited for the first time at the Swiss Watch Fair in Basel.

In 1966, Dr. Peter Atteslander and Eric Enggist bought the rights to Zeno and later sold them to Mr. Felix W. Huber in 1973. Mr. Huber had worked for the company since 1964.

Zeno's workshops gained attention in 1969 with the futuristic "Spacemen" model and the production of the vacuum diving watch called the "Compressor.". Around that time they took over several well-known Swiss watch factories.

=== Current products ===
The best-known watches produced by Zeno are in the "Pilot Classic" collection. Today's model is similar to the Zeno Pilot Basic 1965 original. The range includes mechanical watches, quartz technology wrist watches with analog displays, collectors' wristwatches, pocket watches and sport chronographs in various materials. Since 1999, Zeno has expanded its Pilot watch family of products. They have produced a range of pilot watches in new sizes, together with COSC certificated chronometers. Zeno also makes diving watches used by the Swiss Army for their frogmen, with models rated for up to 300 meters (1000 feet) of depth.
