= Cabot Watch Company =

Swiss watch brand

- Type: Subsidiary
- Industry: Watchmaking
- Founded: 1972
- Founder: Ray Mellor
- Website: https://www.cwcwatch.com/

Cabot Watch Company (CWC) is a producer of Swiss Made timepieces for the British military as well as consumers worldwide.

== History ==
CWC was founded by Ray Mellor, who served in the Merchant Navy during the Battle of the Atlantic in World War II. Following the war, he worked in the watch industry as director of UK subsidiaries of Certina, Zenith and Hamilton. During his tenure with Hamilton, he served as the managing director of the watchmaker's UK business, responsible for Hamilton's contracts with the British Armed Forces.

However they chose to close the UK operation and Mellor founded CWC in 1972 to continue supplying the British Ministry of Defence.

He named the business after the 15th century explorer as he worked in Bristol before the war and his son went to Bristol university where he decided to call the company Cabot Watch Company after John Cabot an intrepid explorer which he felt was fitting as he was starting a new exploration into uncharted waters.

In 1996, CWC was sold to Silvermans Ltd., a London-based retailer of military equipment and surplus goods.

== Models ==
Initial models included the General Service Watch, and pilot's chronograph. In 1980, a dive watch was built to Ministry of Defence specifications which featured a rotating bezel with a fully-graduated insert, and automatic ETA movement.

== Patrons ==
The company is a supplier to the British military currently supplying Black Divers watches to Royal Marines, Royal Navy, Royal Navy Submarines and other special units.

CWC chronographs were previously issued to BBC correspondents. One such model is still frequently worn by Jeremy Bowen, the International Editor of BBC News.
