= Patria (watchmaker) =

Swiss luxury watchmaker

Patria Watch Co or simply Patria (French pronunciation: [pætˌriːˈʌ]), is a Swiss luxury watchmaker based in Bienne, Switzerland, founded in 1892 by Louis Brandt et Frère. Patria manufactured military trench watches which were used extensively in The First World War between 1914 and 1918 and manufactured premium watches to this day in Switzerland. Patria shares a common founder, Louis Brandt et Frère with Omega SA.

Patria began making watches again in the last decade, these watches being manufactured and produced in Switzerland, Patria is considered a premium watch brand

== Company History ==
=== Louis Brandt & Fils: The Precursor to Patria ===
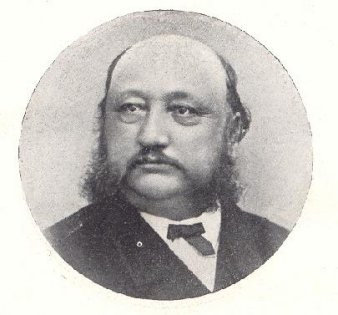
A portrait of Louis Brandt.

In 1848, the watchmaker Louis Brandt, who was just 23 years old at the time, opened a factory for the production of key wound pocket watches in La Chaux-de-Fonds, Switzerland. Following considerable success, he formed the company 'Louis Brandt & Fils' with his eldest son Louis Paul in 1877. Following Louis Brandt's death in 1879, his sons Louis Paul and César took over the family business, inspired by their father's passion for watchmaking. In the same year, they moved the company headquarters to Bienne where it is still located to this day. In 1885, the Brandt Brothers developed their first series-produced calibre, the "Labrador" which would give them commercial success and the means to register new brands and explore new markets.

=== Foundation of Patria ===
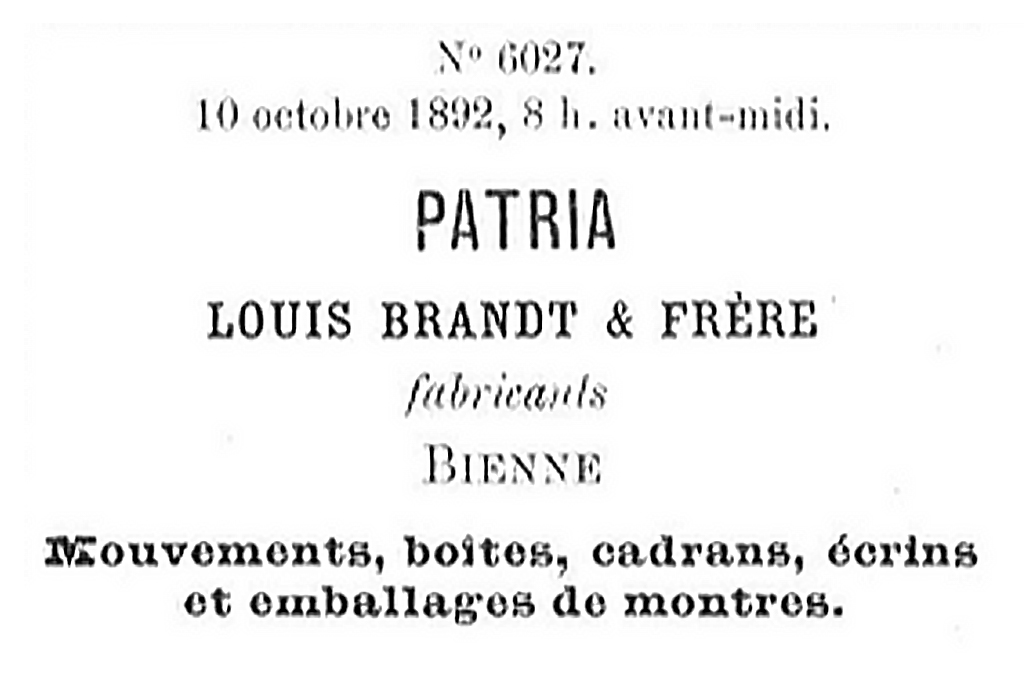
The original trademark publication for Patria in 1892 from Le Bureau Fédéral à Berne

On October 10, 1892 Louis Brand & Fils, run by Louis Paul and César Brandt registered the name 'Patria' with the description, "Mouvements, boites, cadrans, ecrins et emballages de montres". Translated to English, this means "Movements, cases, dials, watch boxes and watch packaging. The name 'Patria' is from the latin word for "Fatherland" or "Homeland", cognate with Ancient Greek πατριά (patriá, “generation, ancestry, descent, tribe, family”) and πατρίς (patrís, "place of one's ancestors").

=== The Wristwatch Emerges from War ===
The importance of wristwatches in battle had already been established following the First Boer War in 1880 and the Third Anglo-Burmese War in 1885. It wasn't until the Second Boer War in 1899 however, that watch companies including Patria began mass-producing purpose-built wristwatches for use in battle. The advantage of a wristwatch over a pocket watch was that the user only required one hand to operate it; a very valuable thing whilst holding a weapon. Prior to this change in cultural attitude, wristwatches were referred to as 'wristlets' and were normally only worn by women.

=== The First Patria Wristwatches ===
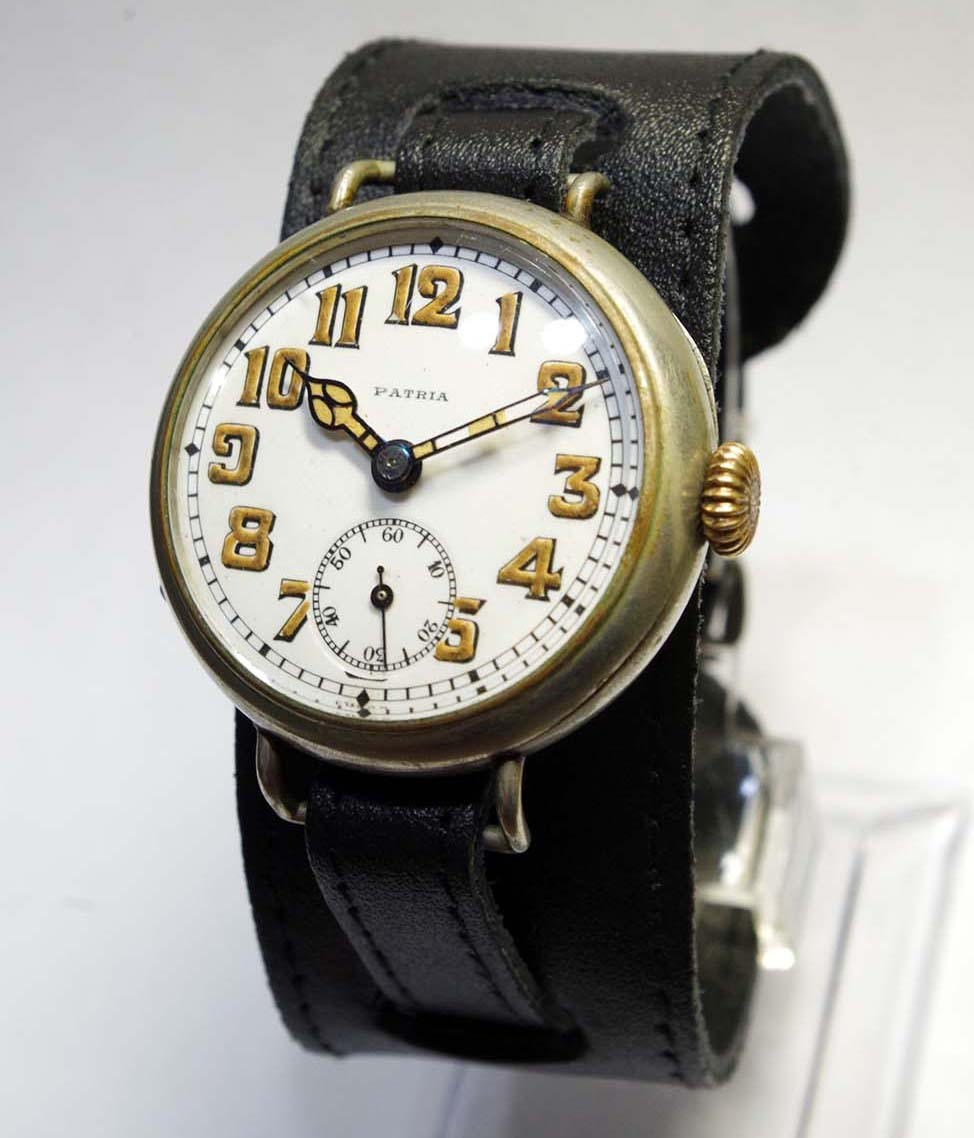
Patria Military Trench Watch from circa 1905 on leather bund strap

At the beginning of the 20th Century, Patria began producing a wristwatch that would later be known as the Military Trench Watch. The Military Trench Watch featured a 36mm diameter case made from sterling silver or nickel silver and a white or black porcelain dial. It also featured large numerals filled with the radioactive substance, radium; a material that glows under low light, providing visibility at all times. The watch featured a nickel-plated in-house 13 ligne calibre, engraved 'Patria Watch Co, Swiss'.

=== Wristwatches for Women ===
Patria manufactured ladies' watches in the early 1900s through to the 1930s, ranging from modest steel case construction to more extravagant silver and 18k gold pieces with decadent engravings and craftsmanship.

=== Patria in the trenches ===
When the First World War broke out in 1914, a tactic known as the creeping artillery barrage was frequently used. This involved artillery fire moving forward in stages just ahead of the advancing infantry and required perfect timing to avoid friendly fire. As a result of this, a quarter of all soldiers were wearing wristwatches by 1916. In 1917, the War Office began issuing wristwatches to all soldiers. A great number of the watches issued to the men fighting in the trenches were Patria trench watches.
