= HYT (watchmaker) =

HYT Watches
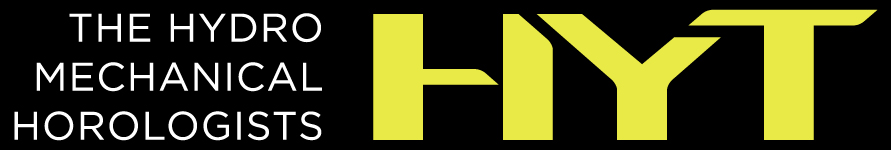
- Industry: Watchmaking
- Founded: 2012
- Founder: Lucien Vuillamoz (Inventor), Patrick Berdoz (Chairman)
- Headquarters: Neuchâtel, Switzerland
- Products: H1, H2, H3, H4, Skull, H0
- Number of employees: 11
- Subsidiaries: Preciflex
- Website: www.hytwatches.com

HYT is a watchmaking company based in Neuchâtel, Switzerland. It is the only watchmaking company to display time with fluids.

HYT was launched in 2012 when it introduced its first hybrid timepiece, the H1, during BaselWorld. They won three awards the same year:

- Best Innovative Watch 2012 – Grand Prix d'Horlogerie de Genève;
- Best concept watch of the year – SIAR in Mexico;
- Best concept watch of the year – Watch World Award in India.

HYT filed for bankruptcy in March 2021. Kairos Technology Switzerland SA purchased HYT's assets later that year.

Vahé Vartzbed was CEO of HYT from July 2024 until November 2025. He previously worked as general manager, and was involved with the brand's strategic operations.
