= Federation of the Swiss Watch Industry =

Swiss trade association

- Federation Logo
- Abbreviation: FH
- Formation: 19 November 1982; 43 years ago
- Location: Biel/Bienne, Switzerland
- Chairman: Jean-Daniel Pasche
- Website: www.fhs.swiss

The Federation of the Swiss Watch Industry (FH) is the Swiss watch industry's leading trade association, headquartered in Biel/Bienne, Switzerland. The Federation is a private, professional and non-profit association.

The Federation of the Swiss Watch Industry was established on 19 November 1982 as the result of the merger of the Swiss Federation of Watch Manufacturers’ Associations (founded in 1876) and the Swiss Chamber of Watchmaking (founded in 1924). It currently gathers more than 500 members representing more than 90% of all Swiss watch manufacturers (watches, clocks, movements, components, etc.).

== History ==
On 14 May 1876, the Intercantonal Association of Jura Industries was founded in Switzerland. In 1900, it became the Swiss Chamber of Watchmaking and Allied Industries, extending the focus to include jewellery, gold & silver work, and music boxes. The Swiss Federation of Clock and Watch Manufacturers’ Associations (FH) was established in 1924 by delegates from Bern, Biel/Bienne, Fleurier, Geneva, La Chaux-de-Fonds, Le Locle, Porrentruy, Tramelan, and German-speaking Switzerland. On 19 November 1982, the two organizations merged to become the Federation of the Swiss Watch Industry (FH). The headquarters were in Biel/Bienne.

== Functions ==
On one hand, the FH provides its members with a large series of services in the fields of legal, economic and commercial issues, representing the sector as a whole, both in Switzerland and abroad. On the other hand, it acts as a privileged counterparts for the authorities, the media and the public in general, coordinating policymaking within the industry.

== See also ==
- Watchmaker
- Chronometer watch
- Clockmaker
- Counterfeit watch

== Publications ==
- Illustrated Professional Dictionary of Horology
