= Ditisheim =

The Ditisheims are a prominent dynasty of Swiss Jewish industrialists. Immigrating first to Hégenheim, France, then to La Chaux-de-Fonds, Switzerland in 1858 to escape religious persecution, Jacques Ditisheim and his descendants were instrumental in the development of the Swiss watchmaking industry. The Ditisheims have links with other prominent industrialist families of Swiss watchmaking, including the Gallets, Eberhards, Vogels and Blums, forming a close inner circle which led the country's industry during the 19th and 20th centuries.

== Notable members ==
Notable members of the Ditisheim family:

- Maurice Ditisheim, founder of the Vulcain manufacture
- Achilles Ditisheim, founder of the Movado manufacture
- Paul Ditisheim, founder of the Solvil et Titus manufacture

== Ditisheims' manufactures ==
- Vulcain (watch company) (1858)
- Movado (1881)
- Solvil et Titus (1892)
