= George-Emile Eberhard =

Georges Eberhard (1865–1926) was a Swiss watchmaker and industrialist who founded Eberhard & Co.

== Biography ==
=== Early life ===
Georges-Lucien Eberhard was born in 1865 in Saint-Imier, the son of a prominent Bernese family tracing its origins back to the 10th century. The Eberhard family had been instrumental in the early development of the Swiss watchmaking industry.

Georges's father initiated him to the art of watch making. Eberhard was only 22 when he moved to La Chaux-de-Fonds, the historic birthplace of the watch-making industry, where he founded its own factory, Eberhard & Co.

=== Eberhard & Co ===
Eberhard's watch-making genius and sense of business turned his factory into one of the largest Swiss watch manufacturers by 1909. Symbolic of its success was the group's new headquarters inaugurated that year. The buildings take an entire block at the very center of rue Leopold Robert, La Chaux-de-Fonds's main avenue. The five-story building was reminiscent of the 19th century Paris works of Georges-Eugène Haussmann, designed in the distinctive Beaux Arts style with a round tower topped by an impressive eagle sculpture that has become one of the city's most well known landmarks, and its highest construction until the 1960s.

In 1919, Eberhard passed the company's executive leadership to his sons, Georges and Maurice.

=== Later life ===
In his later life, Eberhard became the patriarch of one of the wealthiest and most prominent industrialist family of Switzerland. By the time of his death, his children and grandchildren had married into several of the elite industrialist families of the Swiss watchmaking industry, the Blums, Vogels and Ditisheims, and thus were in an ownership position of many of the largest brands of the industry: Eberhard & Co., Ebel, Movado, Vulcain, Solvil et Titus or Paul Ditisheim.

== Name ==
Published sources are inconsistent about Eberhard's given names. Eberhard & Co.'s official history pages identify the founder as Georges-Lucien Eberhard, while their user manuals state that the company was founded by Georges-Emile Eberhard. In another Eberhard & Co. article, the company distinguishes between founder Georges-Lucien Eberhard and his heir Georges-Émile. Independent coverage is also mixed.
