= Paul Vogel =

Paul Vogel may refer to:

- Paul Bernard Vogel (1899–1972), Swiss watch manufacturing industrialist
- Paul C. Vogel (1899–1975), American Oscar-winning cinematographer
- Paul Vogel (American football) (born 1961), American linebacker for Houston Oilers
