= Eberhard & Co. =

Swiss luxury watch company

Eberhard & Co
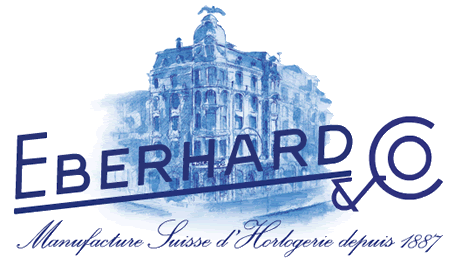
- Founded: 1887, La Chaux-de-Fonds
- Founder: George-Emile Eberhard
- Headquarters: La Chaux-de-Fonds, Switzerland
- Key people: Barbara Monti, CEO, Mario Peserico, Managing Director
- Products: Watches
- Website: eberhard-co-watches.ch

Eberhard & Co is a Swiss luxury watch company, founded in 1887 in La Chaux-de-Fonds, Neuchâtel, Switzerland by Swiss watch making industrialist Georges Eberhard.

== History ==
=== 1887-1900: Early history ===
The Eberhard & Co manufacture was founded on 1887 in La Chaux-de-Fonds, the historic birthplace of the Swiss watchmaking industry by George-Emile Eberhard. Eberhard was the son of a prominent Bernese family tracing its origins back to the 10th century, which was involved in the development of the Swiss watchmaking industry. His father early initiated him to the art of watch making and Eberhard was only 22 when he founded the company.

=== 1900–1947 ===
In 1907, the company has become one of the largest Swiss watch manufacture and inaugurated its new headquarters which takes an entire block at the very center of rue Leopold Robert, La Chaux-de-Fonds's main avenue. The five-story building was reminiscent of the 19th century Paris works of Georges-Eugène Haussmann, designed in the distinctive Beaux Arts style with a round tower topped by a large eagle sculpture, and has become one of the city's well-known landmarks and its highest structure until the 1960s. In 1919, Eberhard's sons, Georges and Maurice took over the company. In 1926 George-Emile Eberhard died and in 1942 his eldest son Georges Eberhard died after which Maurice Eberhard directed the company alone.

=== 1947–1987 ===
After the end of World War II, the manufacture resumed its activities and, in 1947, made its first woman's watch, starting its jewelry collections. Europa Star described André Montandon as Maurice Eberhard's "right-hand man" and stated that, after Montandon and Eberhard’s daughter M.-C. Montandon died in a 1962 car accident in Italy, Eberhard decided to sell the company. The sale was completed in 1972, after which Charles Brandt took over general management of the company, assisted by Walter Stoll. In 1978, Eberhard & Co. S.A transferred its registered office to Bienne.

=== 1987–present ===
Since 1996, the manufacture has decided to focus on luxury king-size wristwatches and launched a new Grande Taille (Super Size) collection. True to its history of technical challenges, Eberhard & Co launched in 1997 the 8 days "a manually winding mechanical watch that needs to be rewound every eight days only" thanks to a special winding device and, in 2001, it launched the Chrono 4 "the first chronograph in the history of watchmaking whose counters are arranged in one row". In 2017 Eberhard & Co. celebrated its 130th anniversary of uninterrupted watch production. A book entitled "The Art of Defying Time" was published for the occasion.
