= Solvil et Titus =

Hong Kong watch company founded in Switzerland

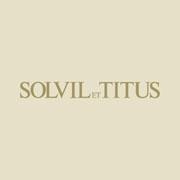
- Industry: Accessories
- Founded: 1892; 134 years ago
- Founder: Paul Ditisheim
- Headquarters: Hong Kong, Hong Kong
- Key people: Paul Bernard Vogel (former owner); Joseph Chong Chun Wong (Chairman)
- Products: Watches, jewellery, electronic systems for timekeeping
- Website: www.solvil-et-titus.com/hk/en/

Solvil et Titus (or Solvil & Titus) is a formerly Swiss, now Hong-Kong watch company and brand, founded in 1887 in La Chaux-de-Fonds, Neuchâtel, Switzerland by Paul Ditisheim and developed by Paul Bernard Vogel.

== History ==
=== Founding ===
Paul Ditisheim, son of the famous Ditisheim family, was born into the small social circle of industrialist families that led the Swiss watch industry of the time. He studied at the Horological School of in La Chaux-de-Fonds, the historic birthplace of the watch-making industry, and received his diploma at the age of 13. He then trained with several of the major watch makers and worked at his family's Vulcain watch company until 1892 when he founded his own brands: Solvil (whose items were often signed Paul Ditisheim) and Titus (whose items were generally marked separately, but both brands are also under the Solvil et Titus company).

Ditisheim was instrumental in developing the new generation of chronometers, improving them through his studies on the impact of atmospheric pressure and magnetic fields. He invented the affix balance. Thanks to his inventions, he was able to make the most precise chronometers ever made at that time. By 1903, his watches had won awards in the Kew and Neuchâtel Observatories contests. In 1912, he won the world's chronometric record of the Royal Kew Observatory. He also worked closely with Physics Nobel prize winner Charles-Edouard Guillaume and has been considered to be the father of modern chronometers. According to Professor M. Andrade of the Besançon Astronomical Observatory, Solvil et Titus Ditisheim's devices "constitute the most important progress of modern chronometry".

=== Split ===
In 1930, Paul Ditisheim handed over the Solvil et Titus and Paul Ditisheim brands to wealthy Swiss entrepreneur and captain of industry Paul Bernard Vogel. Vogel, heir to a prestigious family of industrialist and married to the heiress of the prominent Eberhard family, was also a member of the Swiss watch industry's elite. Vogel moved the company's headquarters to Geneva where he started expanding it. Vogel was one of the most prominent members of Geneva's high society, he was the chairman of the Salon Montres et Bijoux (the Watch and Jewelry's Fair), the most prestigious association of Swiss watch manufacturers and jewelers of the time and used the various social events he organized to advertise his company's collections.

By the 1950s Vogel, feeling the shift in consumer's habits, decided to divide its brands into two. On the one hand, the company kept producing the luxury watches it was famous for. On the other hand, it started producing lower-cost watches that fitted properly the emerging mass consumption markets. Thanks to this new orientation, Solvil et Titus was instrumental in the development of mechanical and electronic watches. In 1968, Vogel took the lead of the newly founded Société des Gardes-Temps SA, a conglomerate of low cost watch manufacturers which was the world's third largest watchmaking company of the time and had a true international dimension (it acquired the American Waltham Watch Company and signed a licensing agreement in 1973 with Elgin Watch – then Swiss watchmaking's biggest foreign investment.

Vogel created an international distribution system and consequently decided to expand Solvil et Titus activities overseas. In the 1970s, surfing on the Asian Tigers economic boom, he sent his son, Paul Vogel, to grow the family business operations in the Asian market. Based in Hong Kong, Paul succeeded into making Solvil et Titus one of the most popular brands in Eastern Asia.

=== Hong Kong ===
In the late 1970s, Paul Vogel who inherited the company from his father came back to Europe and decided to sell the Solvil et Titus brand. The European activities became part of Swiss Ebel while the Asian activities and all the watch brands themselves were sold to Hong Kong entrepreneur Joseph Wong and are now part of Stelux Holdings.
