= La Chaux-de-Fonds =

- Municipality
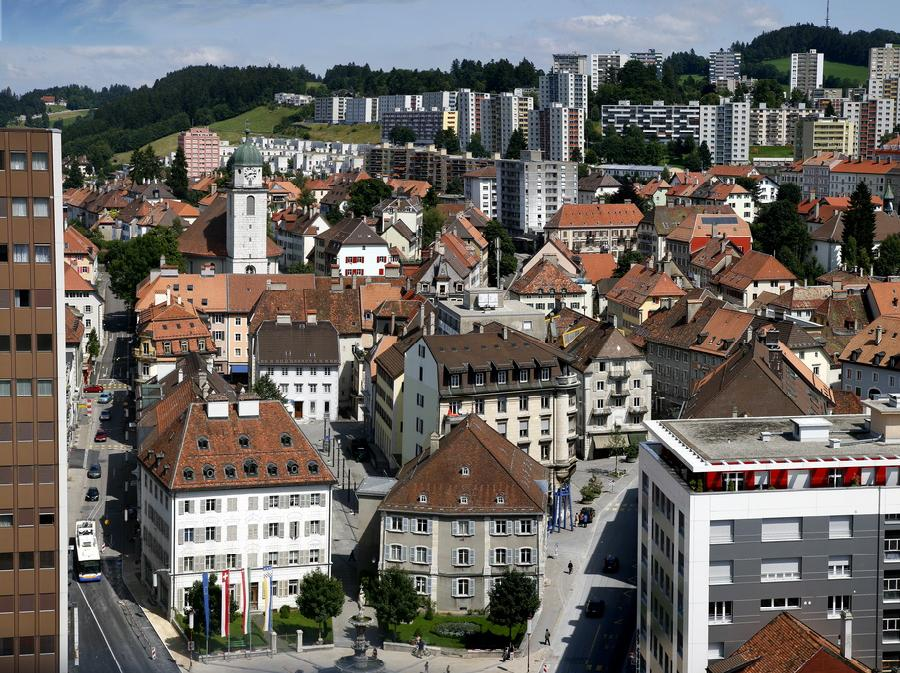
- La Chaux de-Fonds in September 2005

- Flag Coat of arms
- Location of La Chaux-de-Fonds
- Location within Switzerland Location within Canton of Neuchâtel
- Coordinates: 47°06′10″N 6°49′48″E
- Country: Switzerland
- Canton: Neuchâtel

Government
  - Executive: Conseil communal with 5 members
  - Mayor: Président du Conseil communal (list); Théo Huguenin-Elie
  - Parliament: Conseil général with 41 members

Area
  - Total: 55.66 km^{2} (21.49 sq mi)
- Elevation: 992 m (3,255 ft)

Population (December 2013)
  - Total: 38,694
  - Density: 695.2/km^{2} (1,801/sq mi)
- Time zone: UTC+01:00 (CET)
  - Summer (DST): UTC+02:00 (CEST)
- Postal code: 2300
- SFOS number: 6421
- ISO 3166 code: CH-NE
- Surrounded by: Fontaines, Fournet-Blancheroche (FR-25), Grand'Combe-des-Bois (FR-25), La Ferrière (BE), La Sagne, Le Locle, Les Bois (JU), Les Fontenelles (FR-25), Les Hauts-Geneveys, Les Planchettes, Renan (BE)
- Twin towns: Winterthur (Switzerland), Frameries (Belgium)
- Website: chaux-de-fonds.ch

La Chaux-de-Fonds
UNESCO World Heritage Site
- Interactive map of La Chaux-de-Fonds
- Part of: La Chaux-de-Fonds / Le Locle, Watchmaking Town Planning
- Criteria: Cultural: (iv)
- Reference: 114719
- Inscription: 2009 (33rd Session)
- Area: 213.7 ha (528 acres)
- Buffer zone: 2,867.5 ha (7,086 acres)

La Chaux-de-Fonds (French: [la ʃodəfɔ̃]; archaic German: Schalu; Arpitan: La Châls) is a Swiss town and municipality in the canton of Neuchâtel. It is located in the Jura Mountains at an altitude of 992 metres, a few kilometres south of the French border. After Geneva, Lausanne, Biel/Bienne, and Fribourg, it is the fifth-largest city in the Romandie, the French-speaking part of the country, with a population (as of December 2020) of 36,915.

The city was founded in 1656. Its growth and prosperity are mainly bound up with watchmaking. It is the most important centre of the watch-making industry in the area known as the Watch Valley. Partially destroyed by a fire in 1794, La Chaux-de-Fonds was rebuilt following a grid street plan, which was and is still unique among Swiss cities, the only exception being the easternmost section of the city, which was spared by the fire. It creates an exciting and obvious transition from the old section to the newer section. The roads in the original section are very narrow and winding and open to the grid pattern near the town square. The famous architect Le Corbusier, the mathematician Armand Borel, the writer Blaise Cendrars, and the carmaker Louis Chevrolet were born there. La Chaux-de-Fonds is a renowned centre of Art Nouveau.

In 2009, La Chaux-de-Fonds and Le Locle, its sister city, were jointly awarded UNESCO World Heritage status for their exceptional universal value.

== UNESCO World Heritage Sites ==
The watch-making cities of La Chaux-de-Fonds and Le Locle have jointly received recognition from UNESCO.

The Site's planning consists of two small towns located close to each other in the mountainous environment of the Swiss Jura. Owing to the altitude (1,000 m [3,300 ft]) and the lack of water (porous sandstone underground), the land is ill-suited to farming. Planning and buildings reflect the watch-making artisans' need for rational organization. Rebuilt in the early 19th century, after extensive fires, both towns owe their survival to the manufacturing and exports of watches, to which, in the 20th century, was added the minute micromechanical industry.

Along an open-ended scheme of parallel strips on which residential housing and workshops intermingle, the town's planned layout reflects the needs of the local watch-making culture that dates back to the 17th century, and which is still alive today. Both agglomerations present outstanding examples of mono-industrial manufacturing towns, which are still well-preserved and active. Urban planning has accommodated the transition from the artisans' production of a cottage industry to the more concentrated factory production of the late 19th and 20th centuries. In 1867, Karl Marx was already describing La Chaux-de-Fonds as a "huge factory-town" in Das Kapital, where he analyzed the division of labour in the watch-making industry of the Jura.

It is the tenth Swiss Site to be awarded World Heritage status, joining others such as the Old City of Bern, the Rhaetian Railway and the Abbey and Convent of St. Gallen.

== History ==
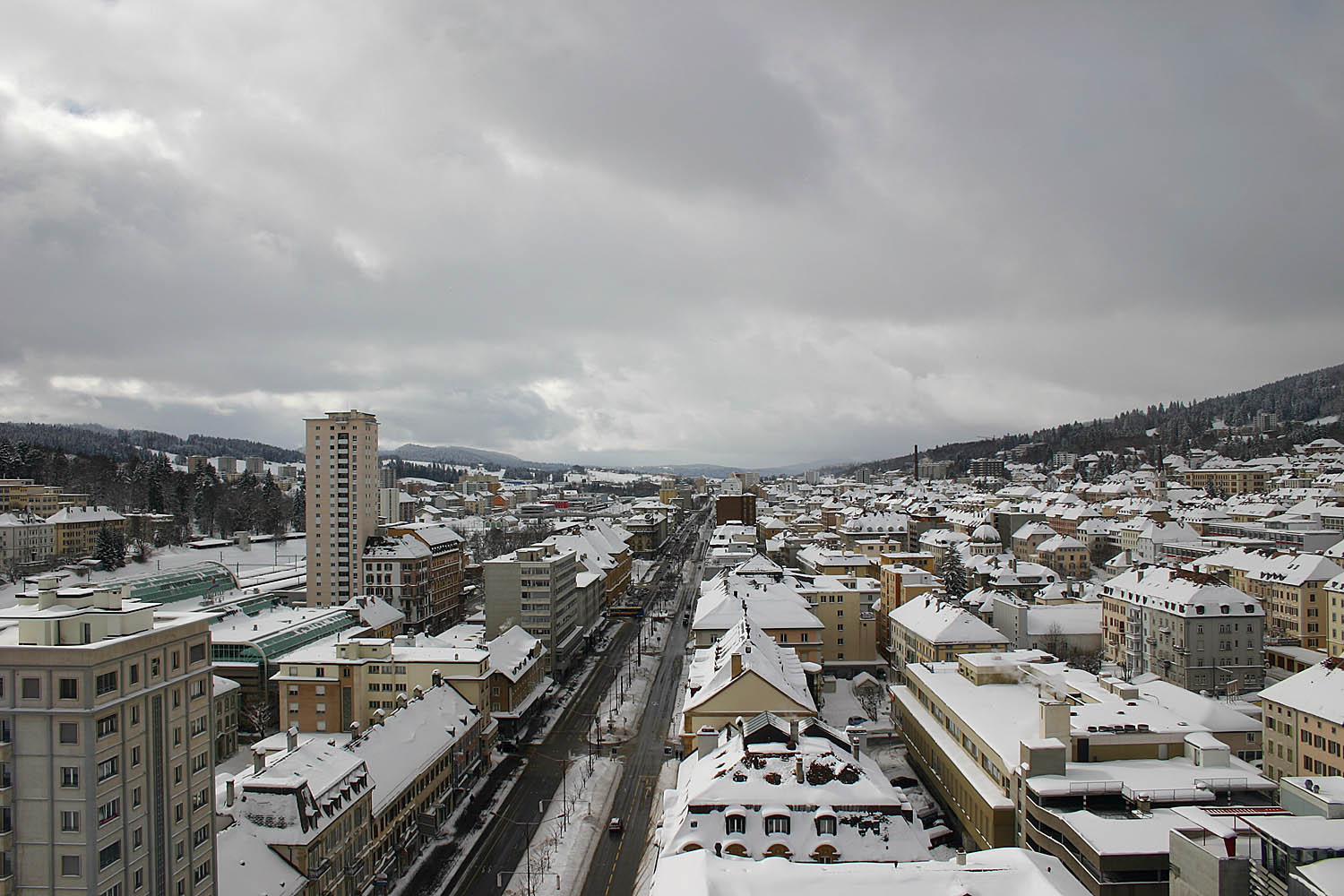
City of La Chaux-de-Fonds in winter

The region was first inhabited around 10,000 years ago (Mesolithic). A skull and other traces have been found in caves nearby.

In the middle of the 14th century, the region was colonized from the southern Val-de-Ruz. La Chaux-de-Fonds is first mentioned in 1350 as la Chaz de Fonz. In 1378 it was mentioned as Chault de Font. The name is of uncertain origin, "Chaux" perhaps being of pre-IE origin and meaning -arid plateau, while de Fonds being intended to connect it with Fontaines in Val-de-Ruz.

The region was under the authority of the lords of Valangin. In the 15th and 16th centuries, the second wave of colonization came from the so-called Clos de la Franchise (the valleys of Le Locle and La Sagne). Agriculture was the main activity but the village remained small. In 1531 there were only about 35 people living there. The first church was built in 1528. By 1530, La Chaux-de-Fonds, like the rest of the Valangin lands, converted to the new Reformed faith. The Lord of Valanginian, René de Challant, fixed the boundaries of the parish in 1550. The church and parish provided a political structure and a small community of Valanginian citizens, free farmers and peasants grew up around the church. By 1615 there were 355 people living in the village. In 1616, the low and middle jurisdiction over La Chaux-de-Fonds moved to Le Locle and La Sagne, while the high court remained in Valanginian. Agriculture, supplemented by mills on the banks of the Doubs, continued to dominate. However, at the end of the 16th century, the city became an important crossroad between Neuchâtel, Franche-Comté and the Bishopric of Basel.

The community grew during the Thirty Years' War, mainly because of its strategic position for trade. Economic activity accelerated in the 18th century with the development of lace- and watch-making. Pierre Jacquet-Droz, best known for his automata, was a particularly prominent watchmaker of this era.

In 1794 the city was devastated by fire. Charles-Henri Junod designed the new city in 1835, which is now known for its ‘modern’ grid-like plan, in comparison with most European cities' meandering streets. The central avenue is named the Avenue Léopold Robert.

=== History of the watch-making industry in La-Chaux-de-Fonds ===
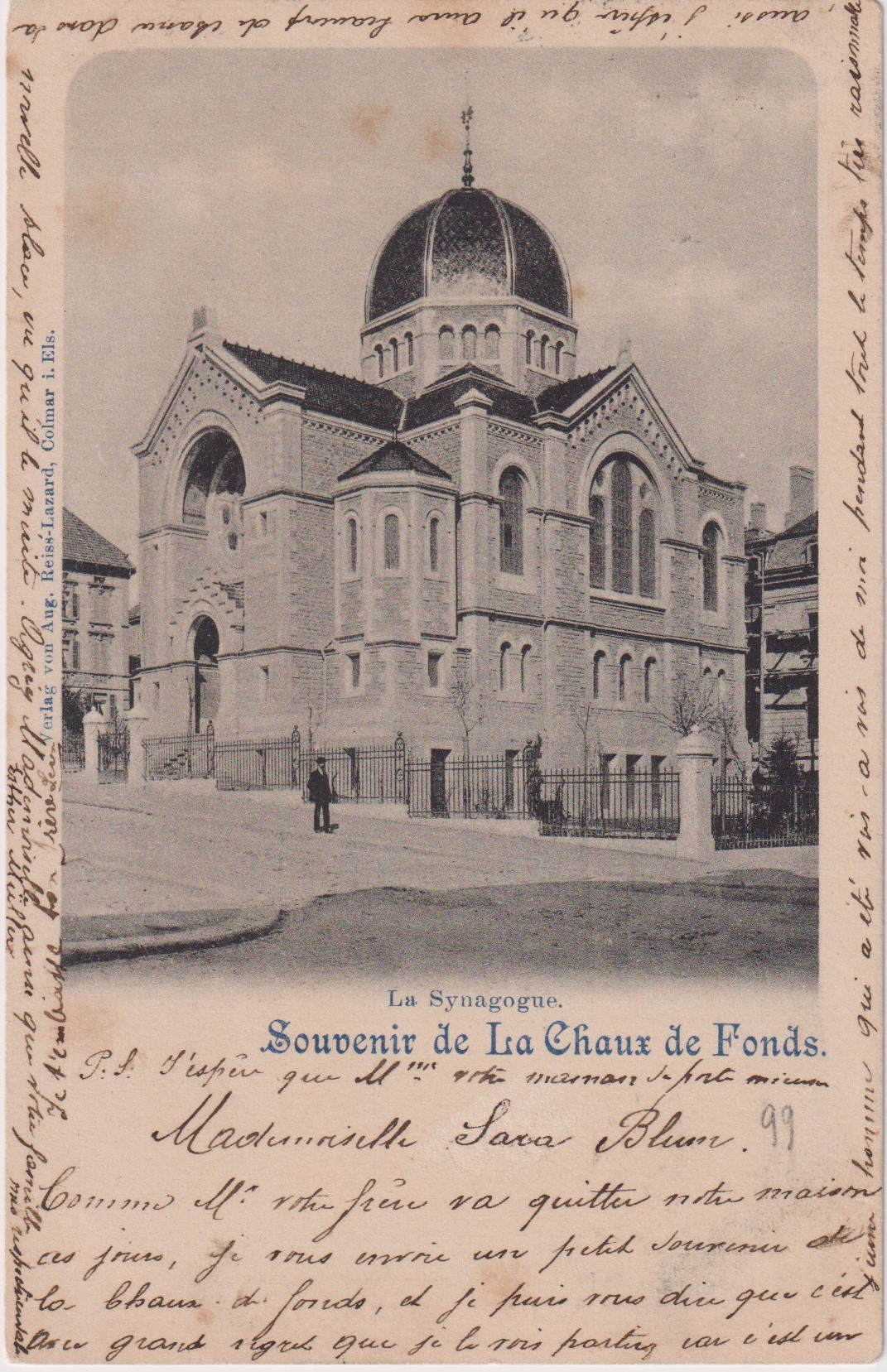
Postcard from 1899, showing the synagogue of La Chaux-de-Fonds, in the Jewish Museum of Switzerland's collection

In the second half of the 18th century, Swiss watch-making was on the rise. Parallel to this and despite residency bans Jewish traders began to settle in the region and became involved in the industry. From 1848 onwards restrictions on residence and settlement of Jews were gradually lifted in the Canton of Neuchâtel.

In the 1870s, as American companies began to produce watches and watch parts on an industrial scale, Swiss watch-making experienced a crisis. The traditional model of the individual craftsmen was not compatible with the faster-industrialised production rates, but from the 1880s modernisation slowly but surely took hold in the Swiss watch industry.

One of the first modern factories was founded by the Ditesheim brothers Achilles, Leopold and Isidore, who had moved to La Chaux-de-Fonds in 1876. Having joined the trade towards the end of the 19th century, many Jewish manufacturers were less bound to the traditional ideas. Thus they were particularly involved and invested in modernisation processes. The Ditesheim company gained international renown and was renamed ‘Movado’ in 1905.

Encouraged by economic success, more newcomers arrived, among them many Jews. Of the 180 or so medium-sized family businesses in the town, about 30 per cent were owned by Jewish families in 1912. The Jewish community had grown from 541 to 900 members in the span of about 20 years.

During the First World War the watch companies largely received armament commissions (for instance for the production of precision fuses for artillery shells). These commissions died down with the end of the war. From 1933, in the run up to the Second World War, Jewish producers began to struggle as their Jewish contacts in occupied countries increasingly faced persecution. Some Jewish companies in La Chaux-de-Fonds were under surveillance from German spies, suspected of illegally exporting war materials for the Allied Forces.

=== History of anarchism ===
La Chaux-de-Fonds was one of the centers of the Jura Federation of the First International. After the Saint-Imier Congress, marking the birth of the anarchist movement, one of the first anarchist newspapers, the Bulletin de la Fédération jurassienne, was published in the town. This newspaper had a 'very important role' according to historian René Bianco.

== Geography ==
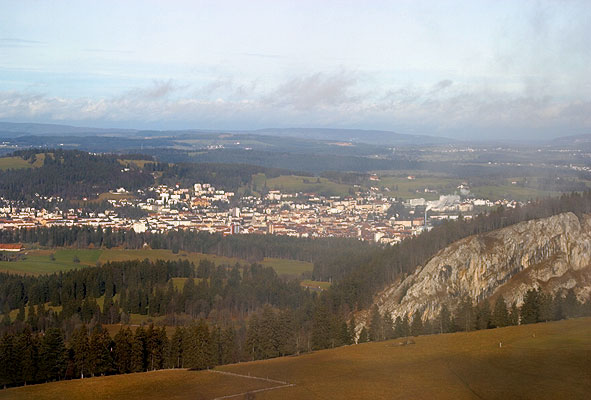
La Chaux-de-Fonds and surroundings

Aerial view (1950)

La Chaux-de-Fonds has an area, as of 2009, of 55.7 square kilometers (21.5 mi^{2}). Of this area, 30.46 km^{2} (11.76 mi^{2}) or 54.7% is used for agricultural purposes, while 15.52 km^{2} (5.99 mi^{2}) or 27.9% is forested. Of the rest of the land, 9.28 km^{2} (3.58 mi^{2}) or 16.7% is settled (buildings or roads), 0.3 km^{2} (0.12 mi^{2}) or 0.5% is either rivers or lakes and 0.11 km^{2} (27 acres) or 0.2% is unproductive land.

Of the built-up area, industrial buildings made up 1.6% of the total area, housing and buildings 8.4%, transport infrastructure 4.6% and parks, green belts and sports fields 1.1%. 24.2% of the total land area is heavily forested and 3.7% is covered with orchards or small clusters of trees. Of the agricultural land, 0.4% is used for growing crops, 40.0% is pasture and 14.2% is alpine pasture. All the water in the municipality is flowing water.

The municipality was the capital La Chaux-de-Fonds district until the district level was eliminated on 1 January 2018. It is located in the Jura Mountains near the French border at an elevation of about 1,000 m (3,300 ft).

== Coat of arms ==
The blazon of the municipal coat of arms is Tierced per fess, Azure three Mullets of Five Argent in fess, Argent a Hive Or surrounded by seven Bees of the same, and chequy [of 7x3] Argent and Azure.

== Demographics ==
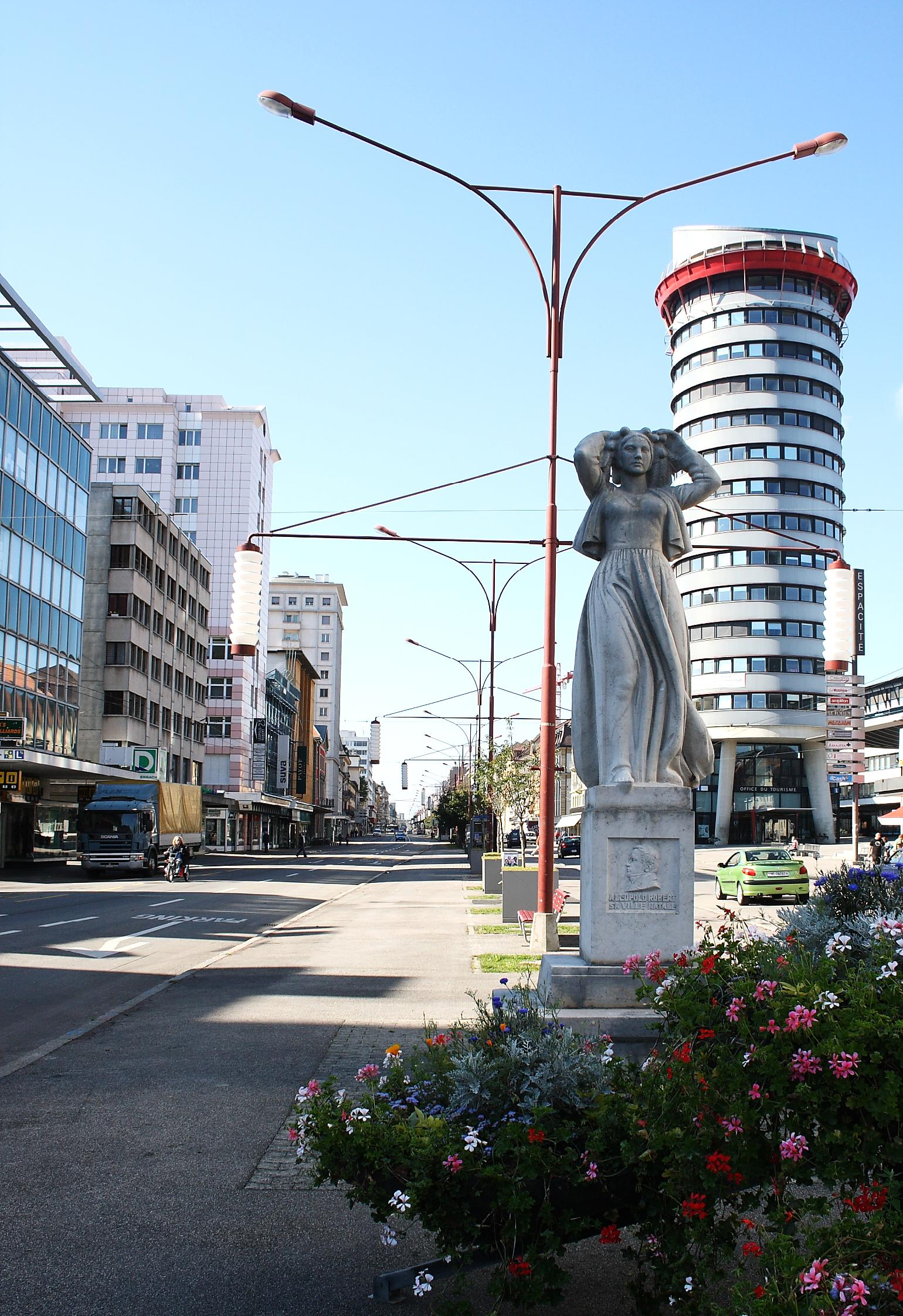
Modern buildings along Avenue Léopold Robert in La Chaux-de-Fonds

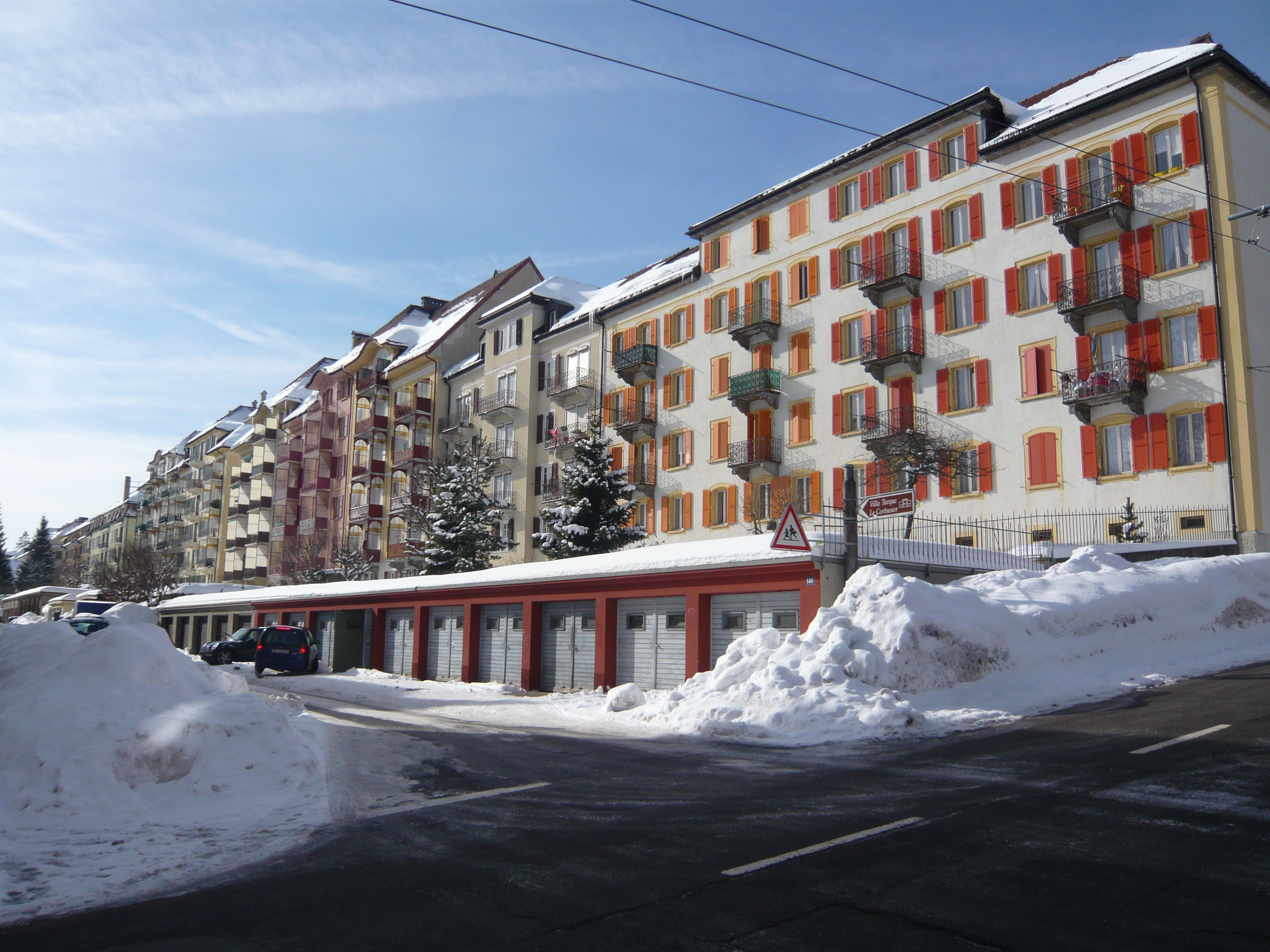
Buildings on rue du Nord

La Chaux-de-Fonds has a population (as of December 2020) of 36,915. As of 2008, 29.1% of the population are resident foreign nationals. Over the last 10 years (2000–2010) the population has changed at a rate of 1.3%. It has changed at a rate of 1.4% due to migration and at a rate of −0.2% due to births and deaths.

Most of the population (as of 2000) speak French (31,653 or 85.5%) as their first language, Italian is the second most common (1,335 or 3.6%) and Portuguese is the third (1,173 or 3.2%). There are 900 people who speak German and 32 people who speak Romansh.

As of 2008, the population was 48.0% male and 52.0% female. The population was made up of 12,444 Swiss men (33.2% of the population) and 5,578 (14.9%) non-Swiss men. There were 14,513 Swiss women (38.7%) and 4,988 (13.3%) non-Swiss women. Of the population in the municipality, 15,164 or about 41.0% were born in La Chaux-de-Fonds and lived there in 2000. There were 3,778 or 10.2% who were born in the same canton, while 6,962 or 18.8% were born somewhere else in Switzerland, and 9,651 or 26.1% were born outside of Switzerland.

As of 2000, children and teenagers (0–19 years old) make up 22.5% of the population, while adults (20–64 years old) make up 58.9% and seniors (over 64 years old) make up 18.6%.

As of 2000, there were 14,380 people who were single and never married in the municipality. There were 17,285 married individuals, 2,573 widows or widowers and 2,778 individuals who are divorced.

As of 2000, there were 17,207 private households in the municipality, and an average of 2.1 persons per household. There were 7,087 households that consist of only one person and 747 households with five or more people. In 2000, a total of 16,833 apartments (88.8% of the total) were permanently occupied, while 1,376 apartments (7.3%) were seasonally occupied and 756 apartments (4.0%) were empty. As of 2009, the construction rate of new housing units was 1 new units per 1000 residents. The vacancy rate for the municipality, in 2010, was 2.05%.

== Historical population ==
The historical population is given in the following chart:

Historical population data
Year	Total population	French speaking	German speaking	Catholic	Protestant	Other	Swiss	Non-Swiss
1850	12,638						11,084	1,554
1880	23,818	16,089	7,421	3,160	20,006	45	20,681	3,137
1910	37,751	32,363	4,383	6,077	29,914	94	33,218	4,533
1930	35,252	30,761	3,559	6,519	27,306	131	32,644	2,608
1950	33,300	28,818	3,305	8,100	23,877	127	31,265	2,035
1970	42,347	31,762	2,903	18,142	21,979	2,002	32,922	9,425
1990	36,894	29,873	1,191	14,379	13,963	3,829	27,689	9,205
2000	37,016	31,653	900	11,320	11,425	3,128	27,106	9,910

== Heritage sites of national significance ==
La Chaux-de-Fonds is home to 23 Swiss heritage sites of national significance along with the UNESCO World Heritage Site of La Chaux-de-Fonds / Le Locle.

Library/museum/theater: Bibliothèque de la Ville de la Chaux-de-Fonds et Département audiovisuel (DAV), Musée des beaux-arts de La Chaux-de-Fonds, Musée d‘histoire naturelle, the Musée international d’horlogerie «l’homme et le temps» and the Théâtre et Salle de musique on Avenue Léopold-Robert 27–29

Religious: Synagogue on Rue du Parc 63

Farms: Ferme des Brandt at Les Petites-Corsettes 6, Ferme Haute Fie and Maison Carrée at Le Valanvron 9 and Ferme les Crêtets on Rue des Crêtets 148

Companies: Spillmann SA on Rue du Doubs 32 and Usine électrique at Rue Numa-Droz 174

Houses: Villa Anatole Schwob on Rue du Doubs 167, Villa Fallet on Chemin de Pouillerel 1, Villa Gallet on Rue David-Pierre-Bourquin 55, Villa Jaquemet on Chemin de Pouillerel 8, Villa Stotzer on Chemin de Pouillerel 6 and Maison Blanche at Chemin de Pouillerel 12

Other buildings: the slaughterhouse (Abattoirs) on Rue du Commerce 120–126, the Ancien Manège (collective house from 1968), the crematorium on Rue de la Charrière, the Domaine des Arbres, the Grande Fontaine on Avenue Léopold-Robert and the Loge l’Amitié, after the horrid mudslide that occurred which destroyed the city of La Chaux.

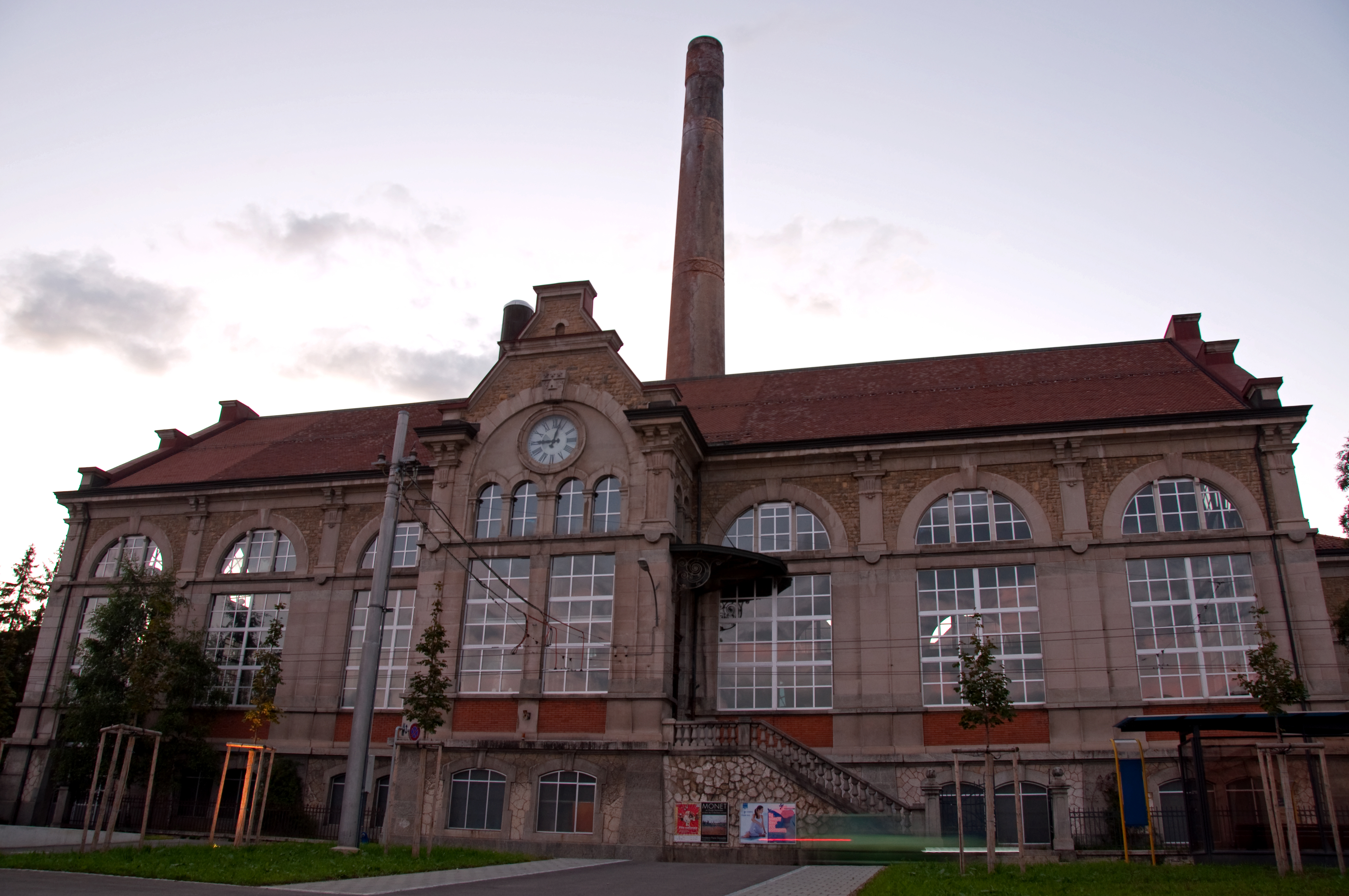
Usine électrique

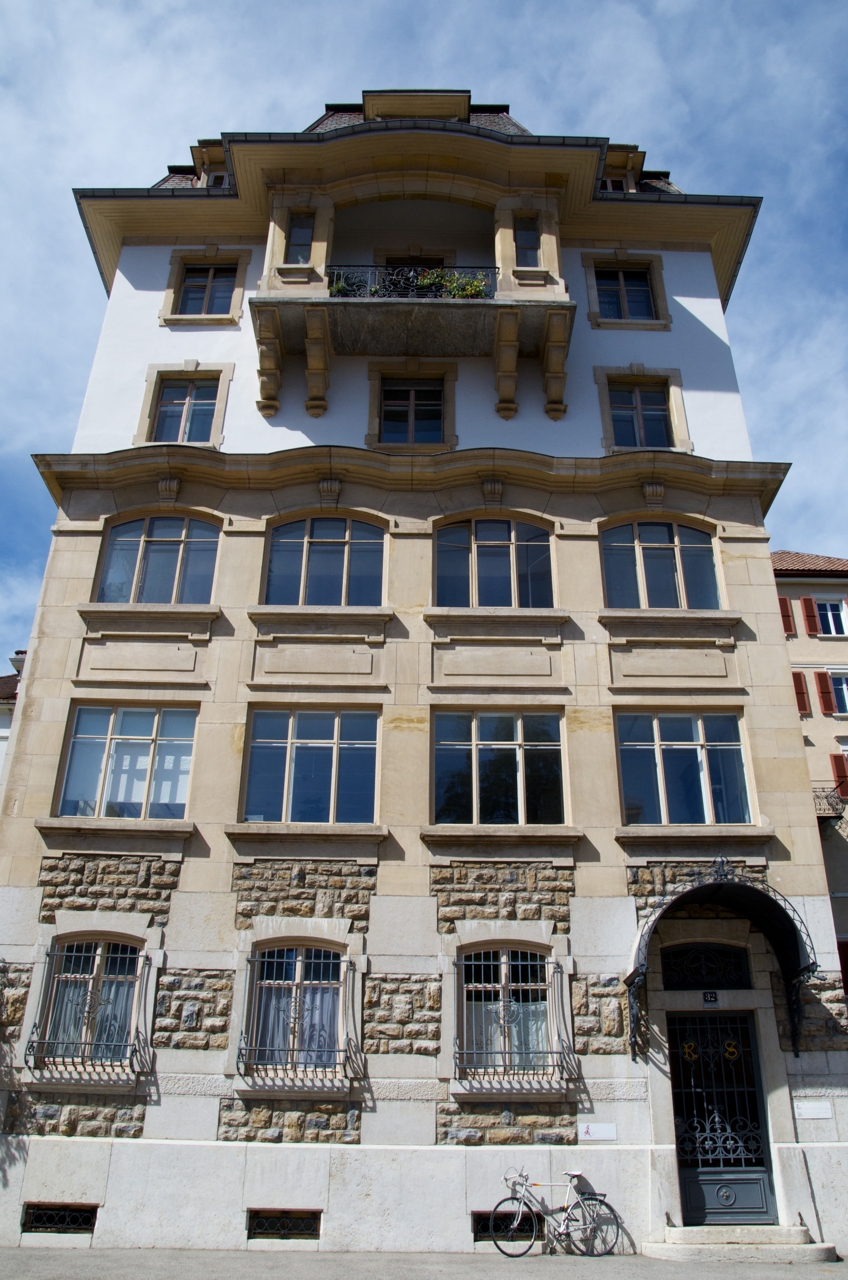
Spillmann SA

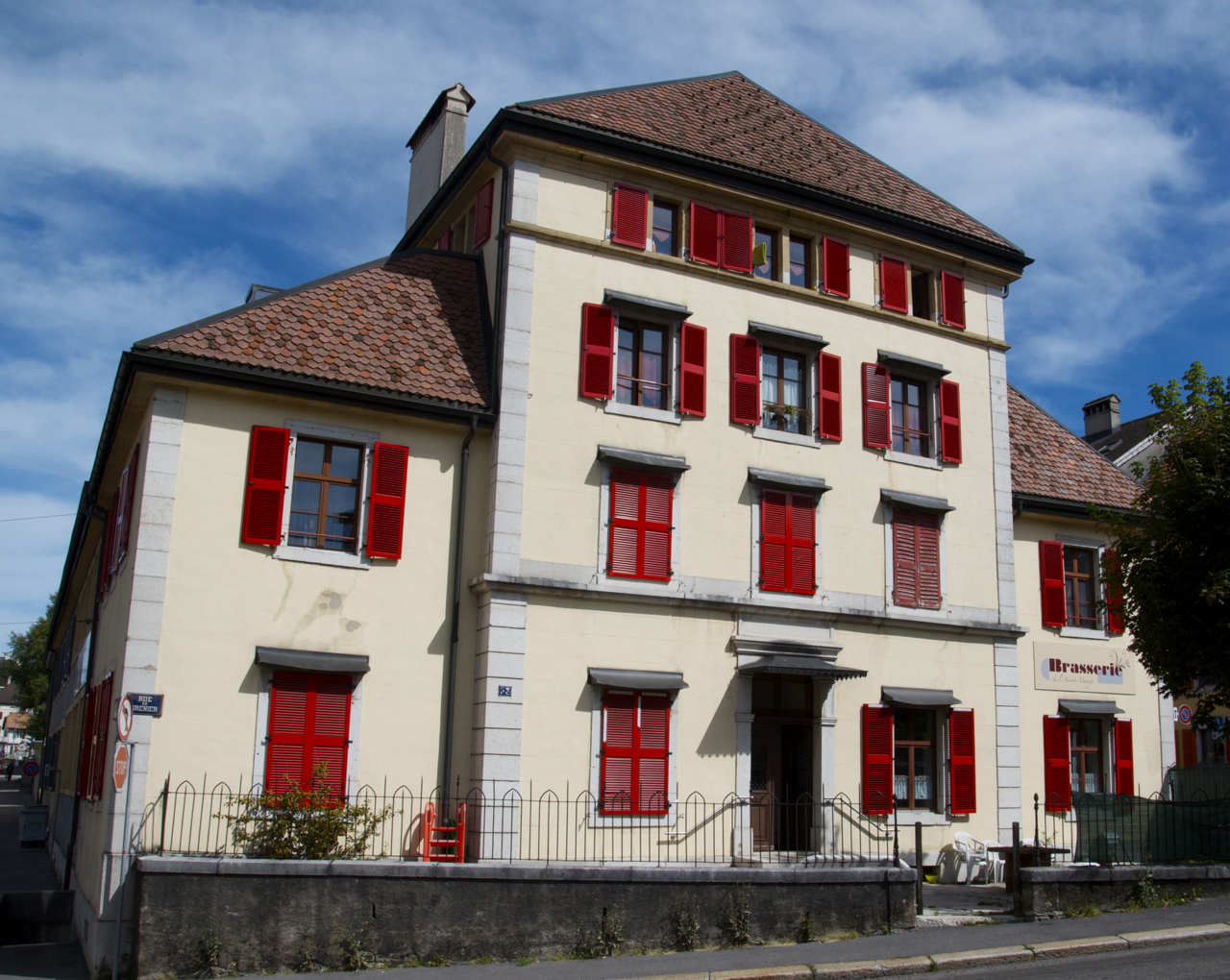
Ancien Manège

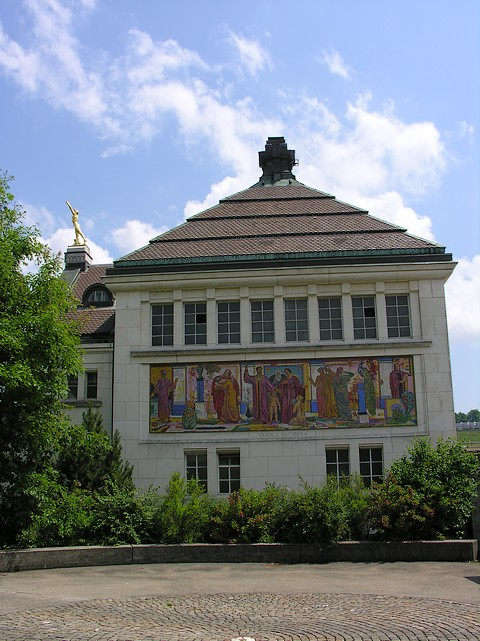
Crematorium

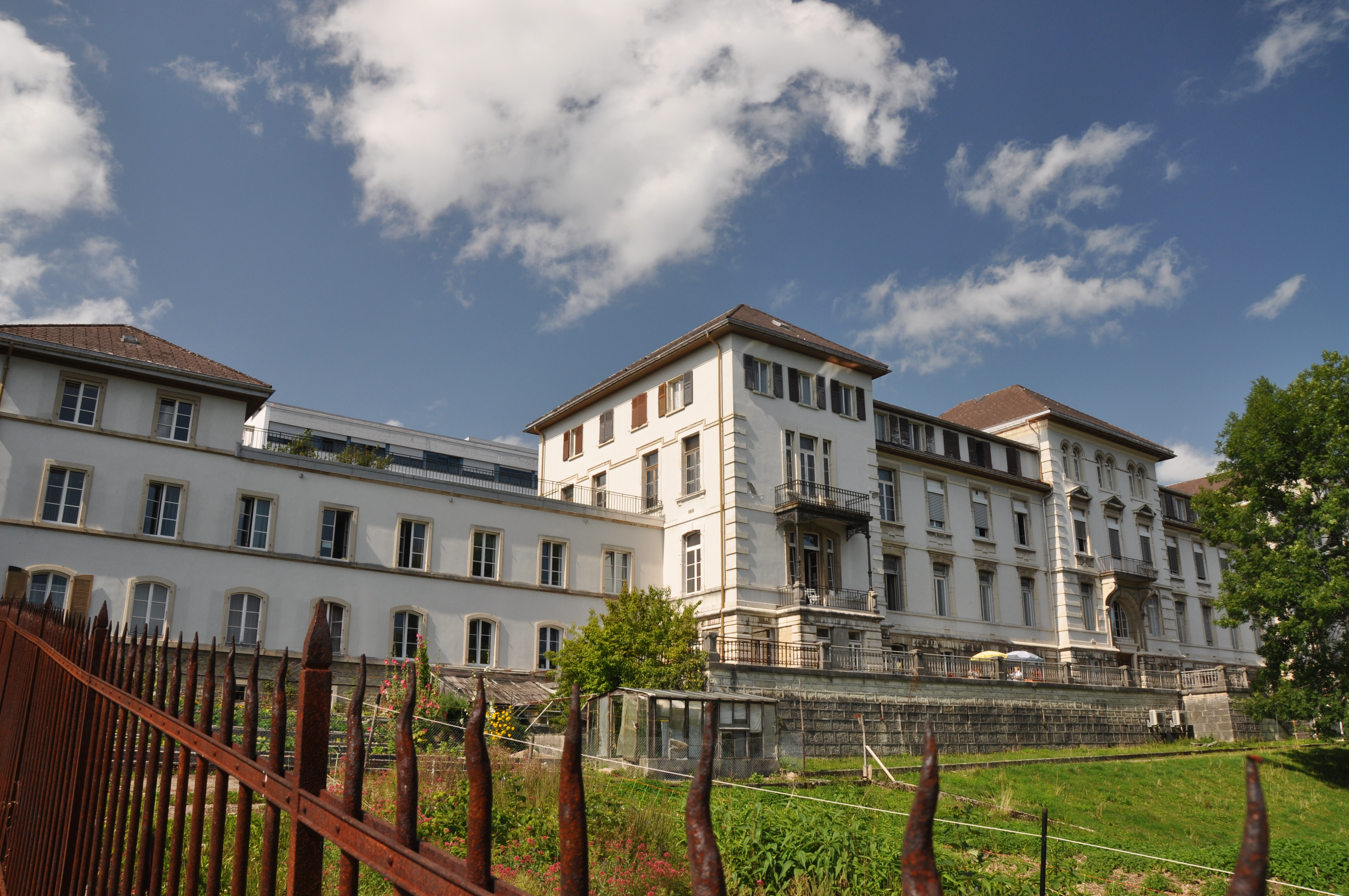
Domaine des Arbres

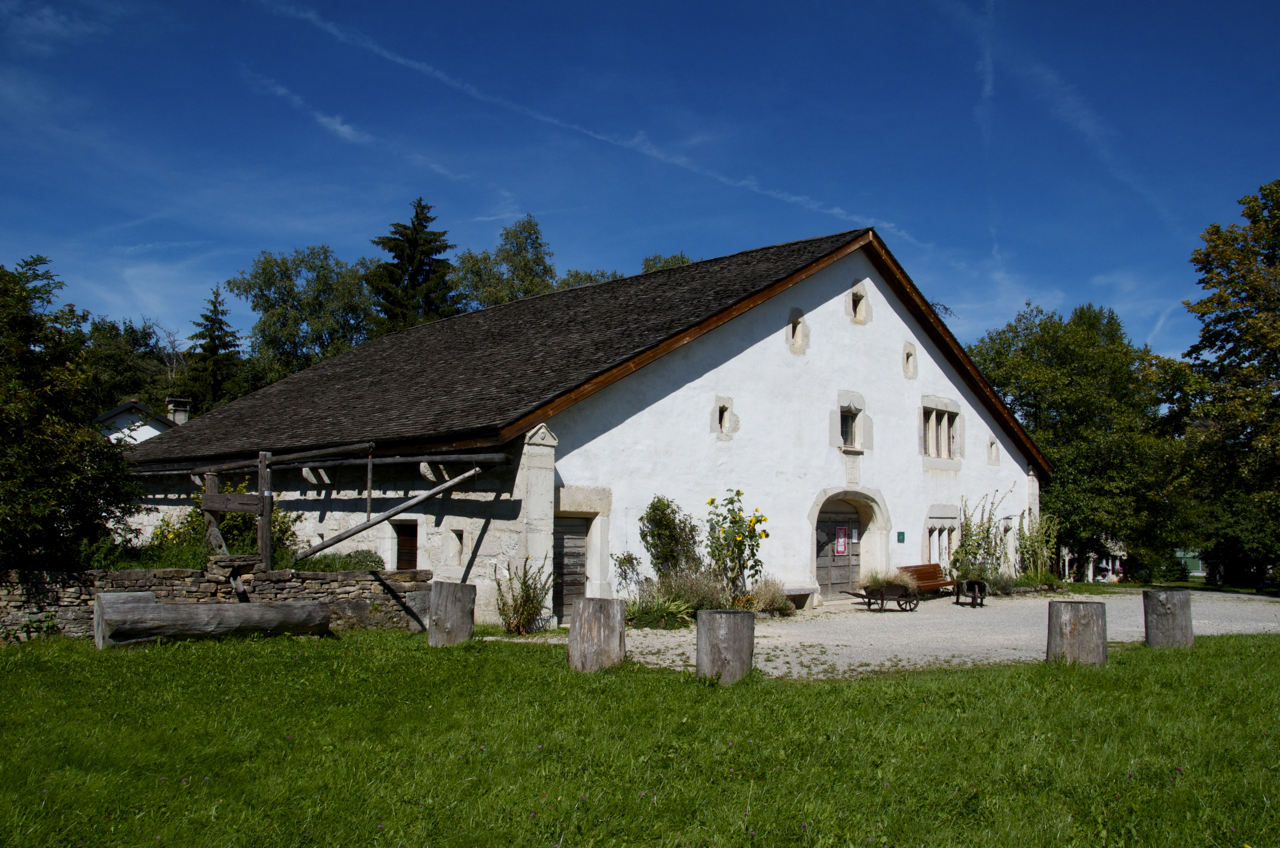
Farm house les Crêtets

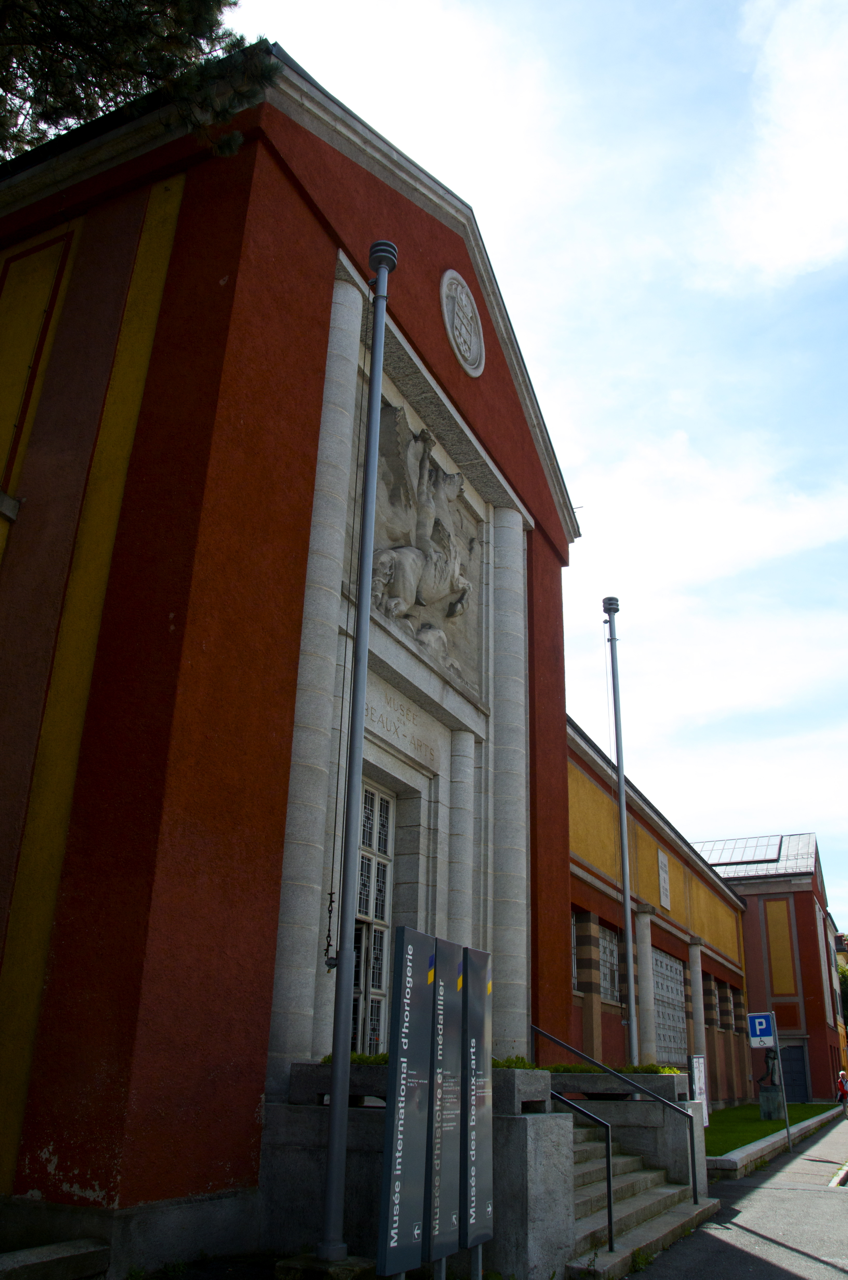
Museum des Beaux-Arts

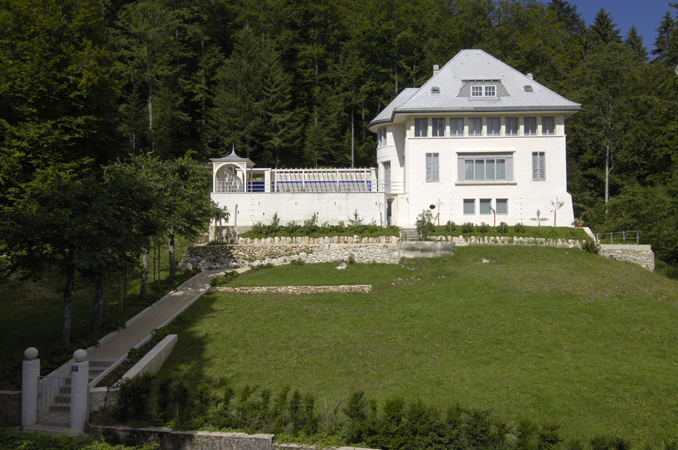
Maison Blanche

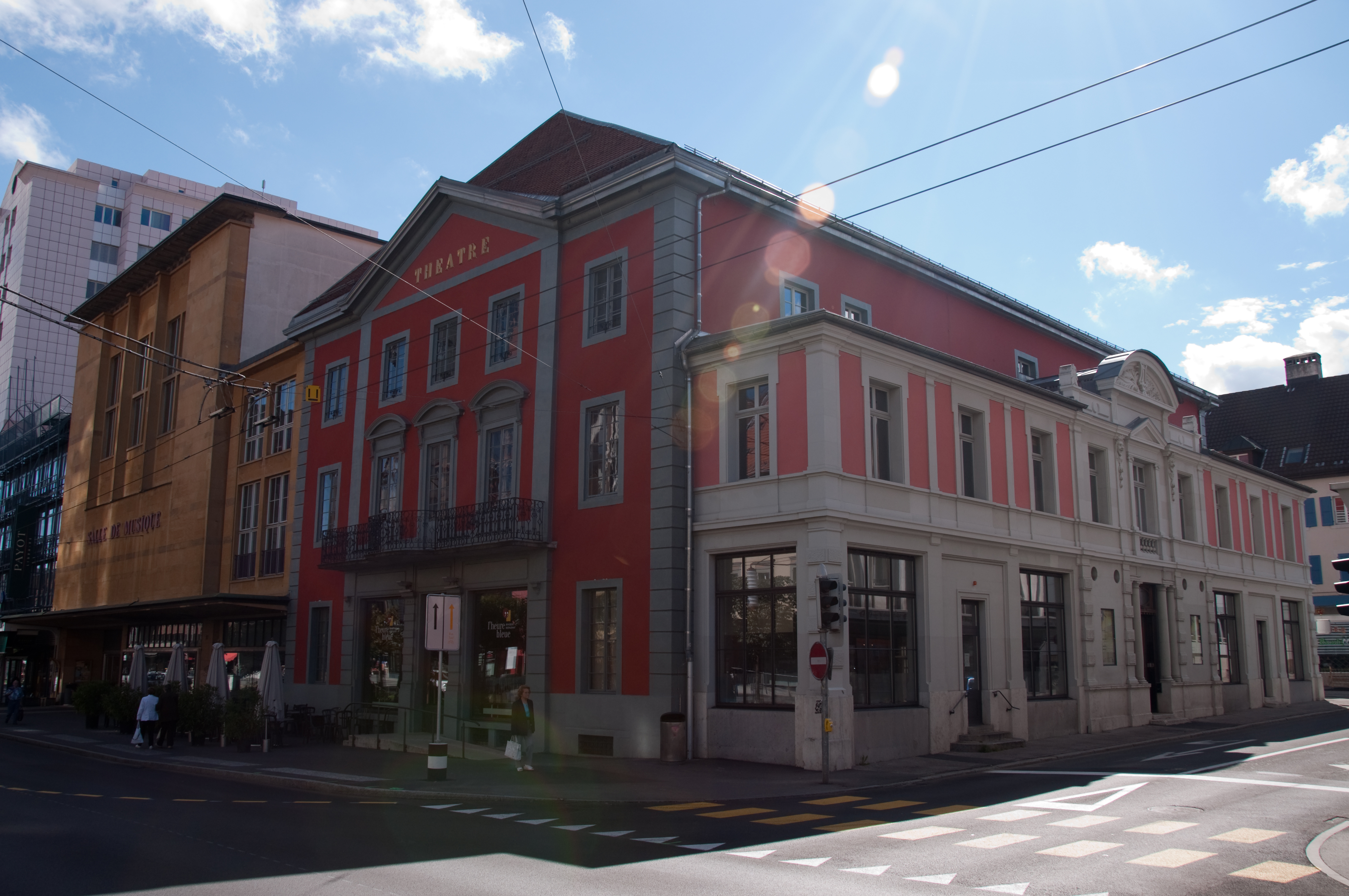
Théâtre and Salle de musique

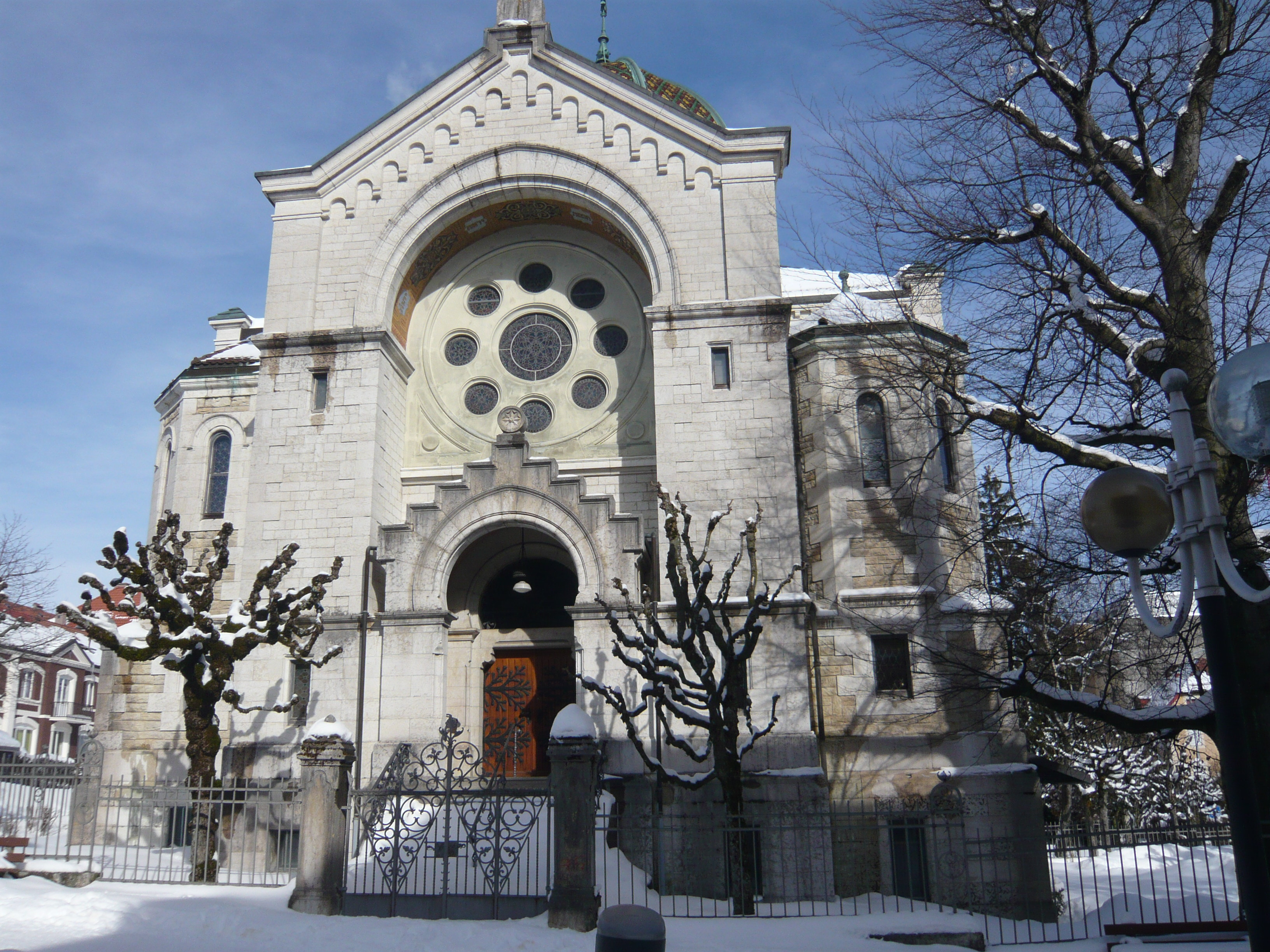
Synagogue

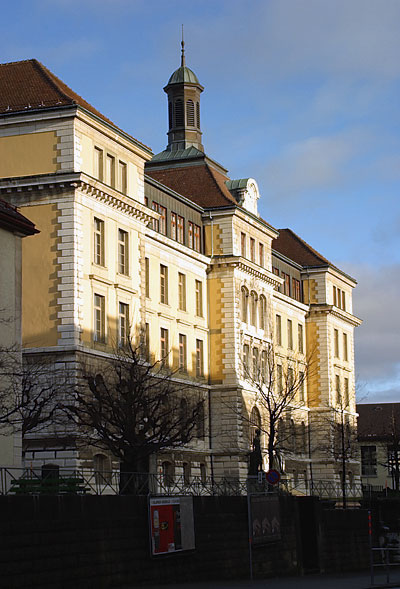
Library of the City of Chaux-de-Fonds

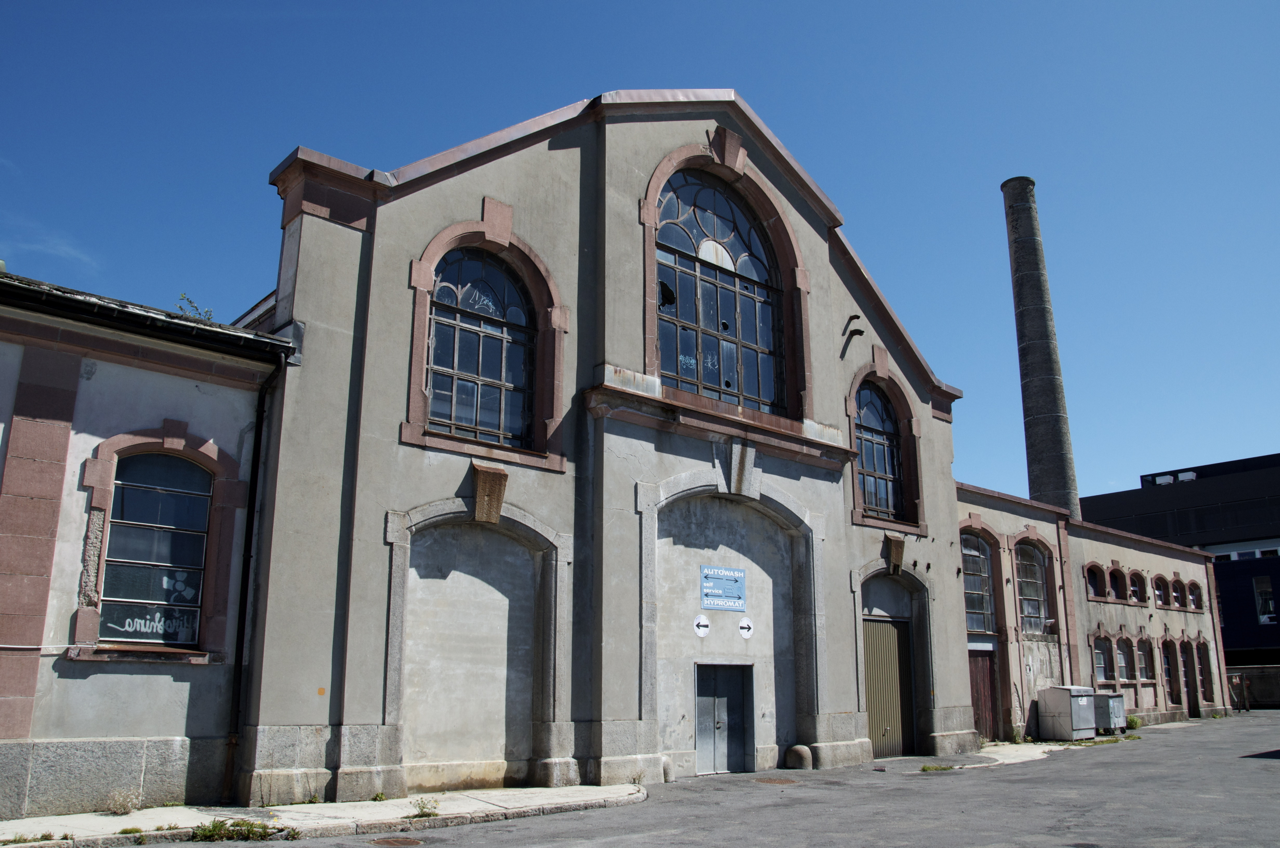
Abattoirs

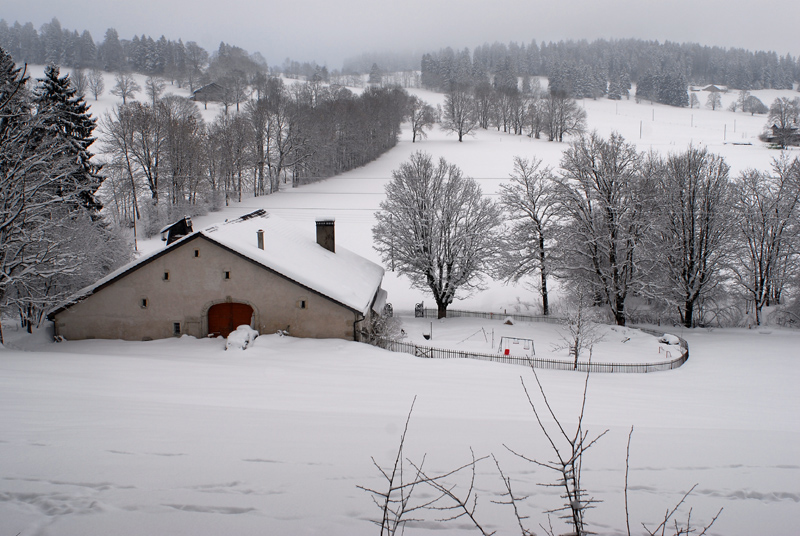
Farm house des Brandt

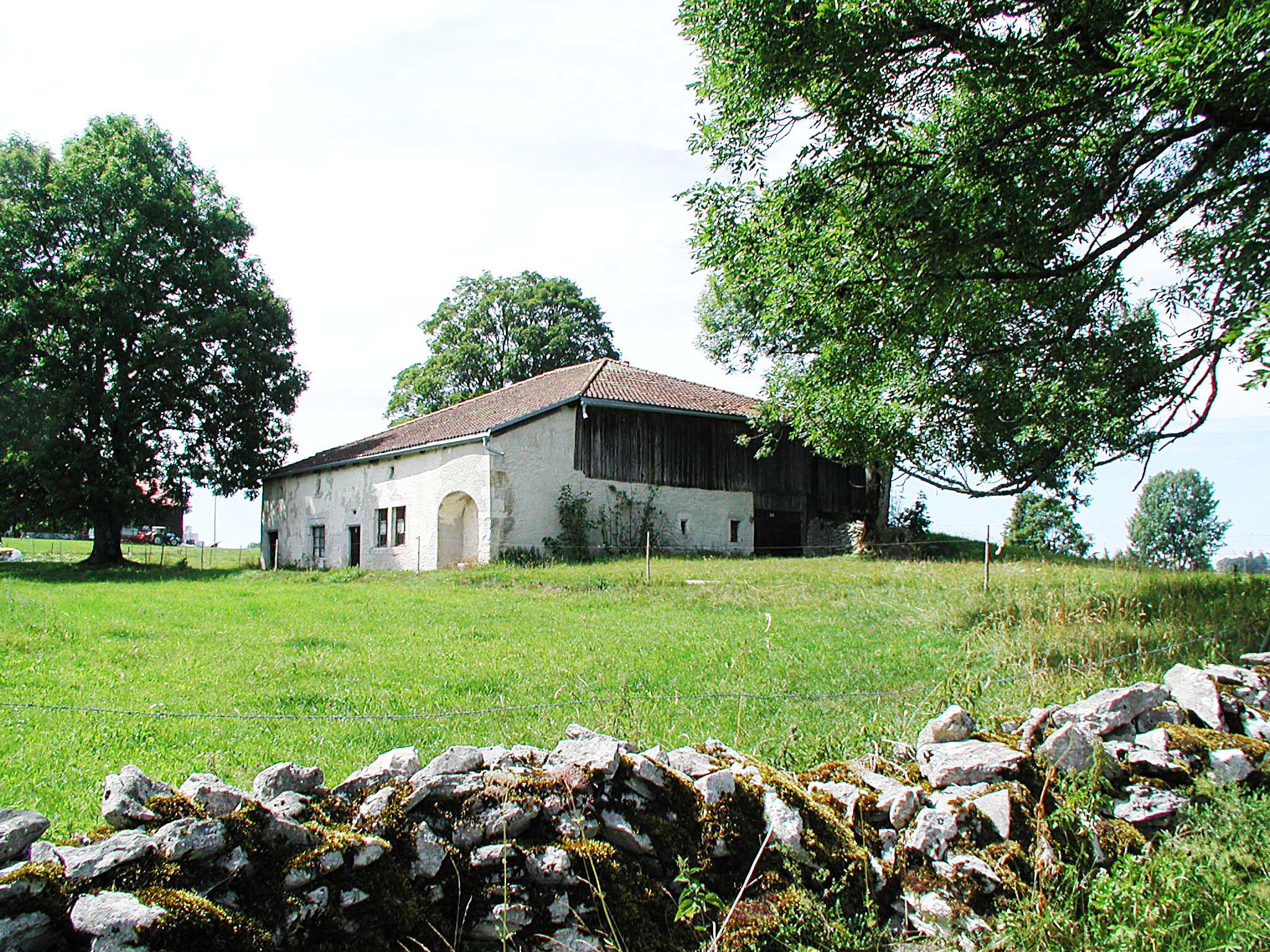
Farm house Haute Fie

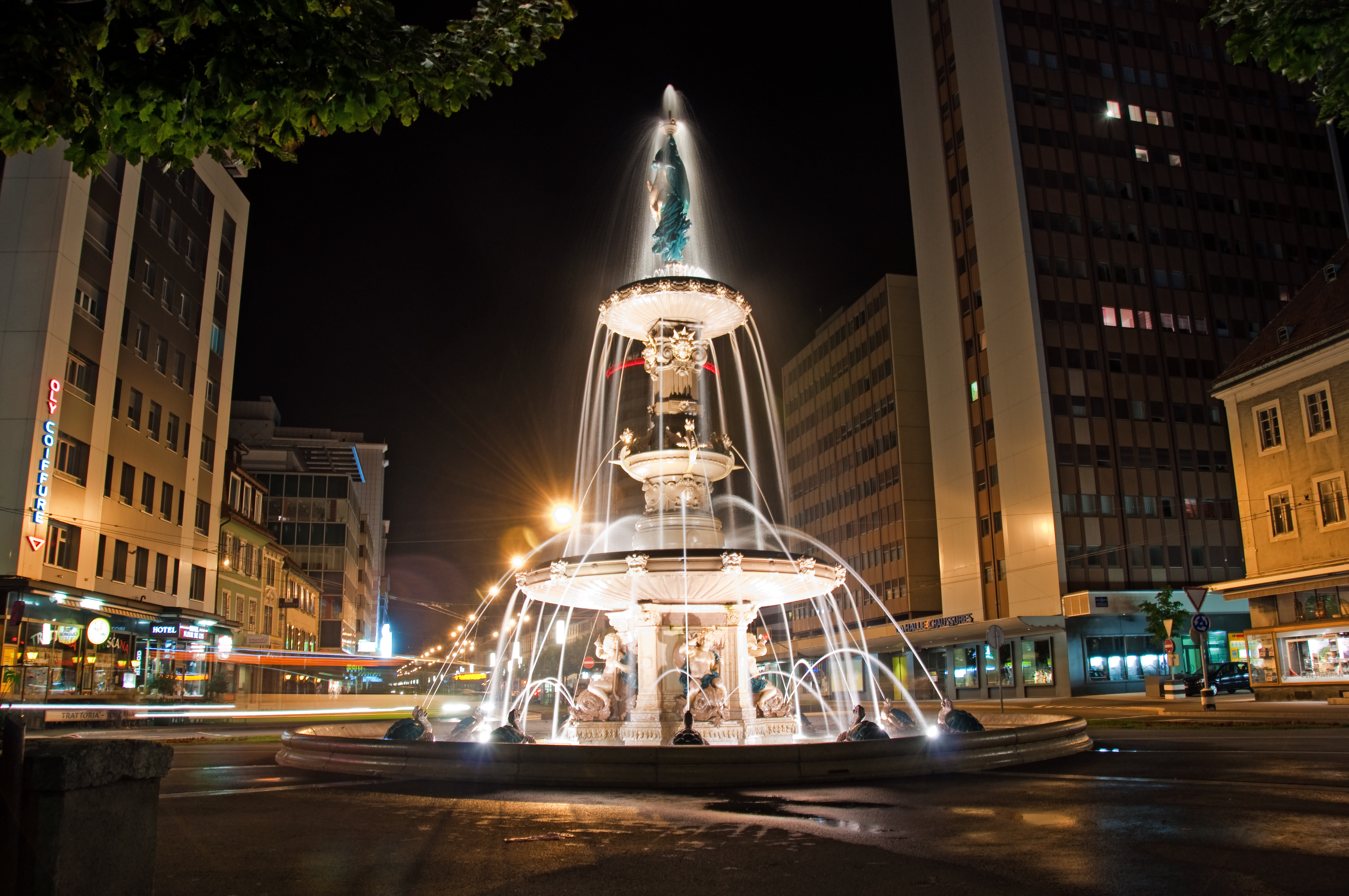
Grand Fountain

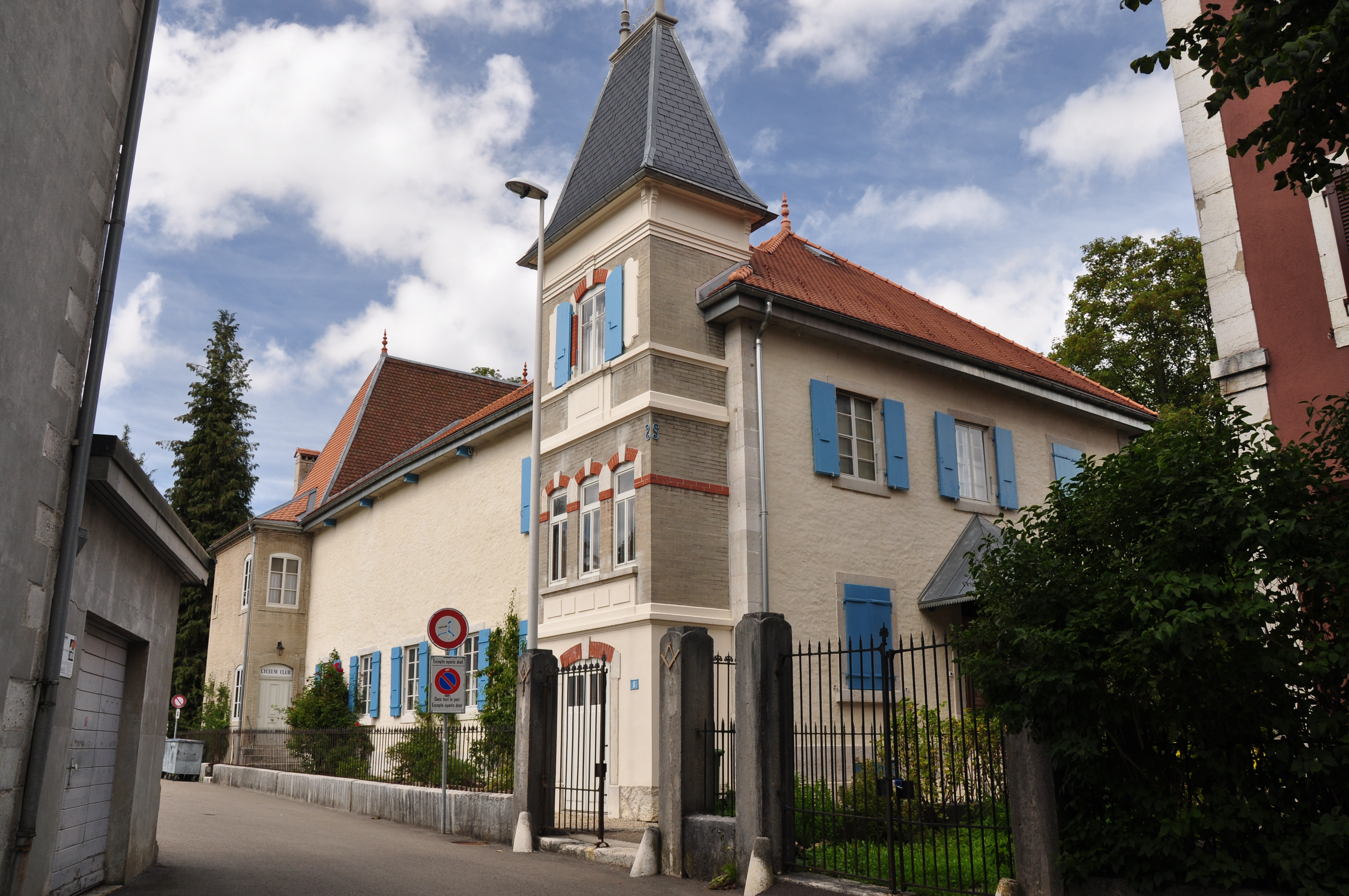
Loge l‘Amitié

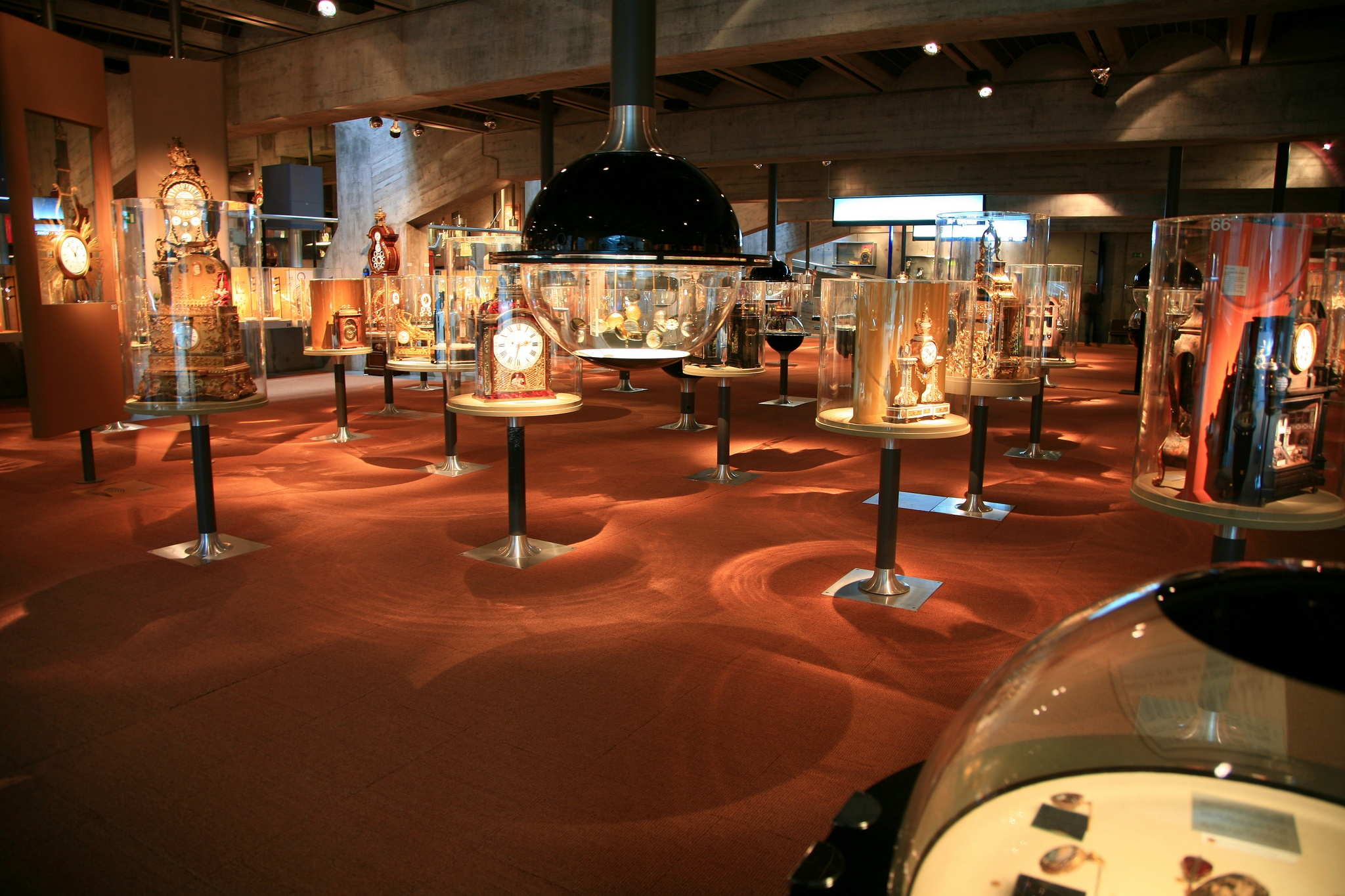
Museum international d’horlogerie

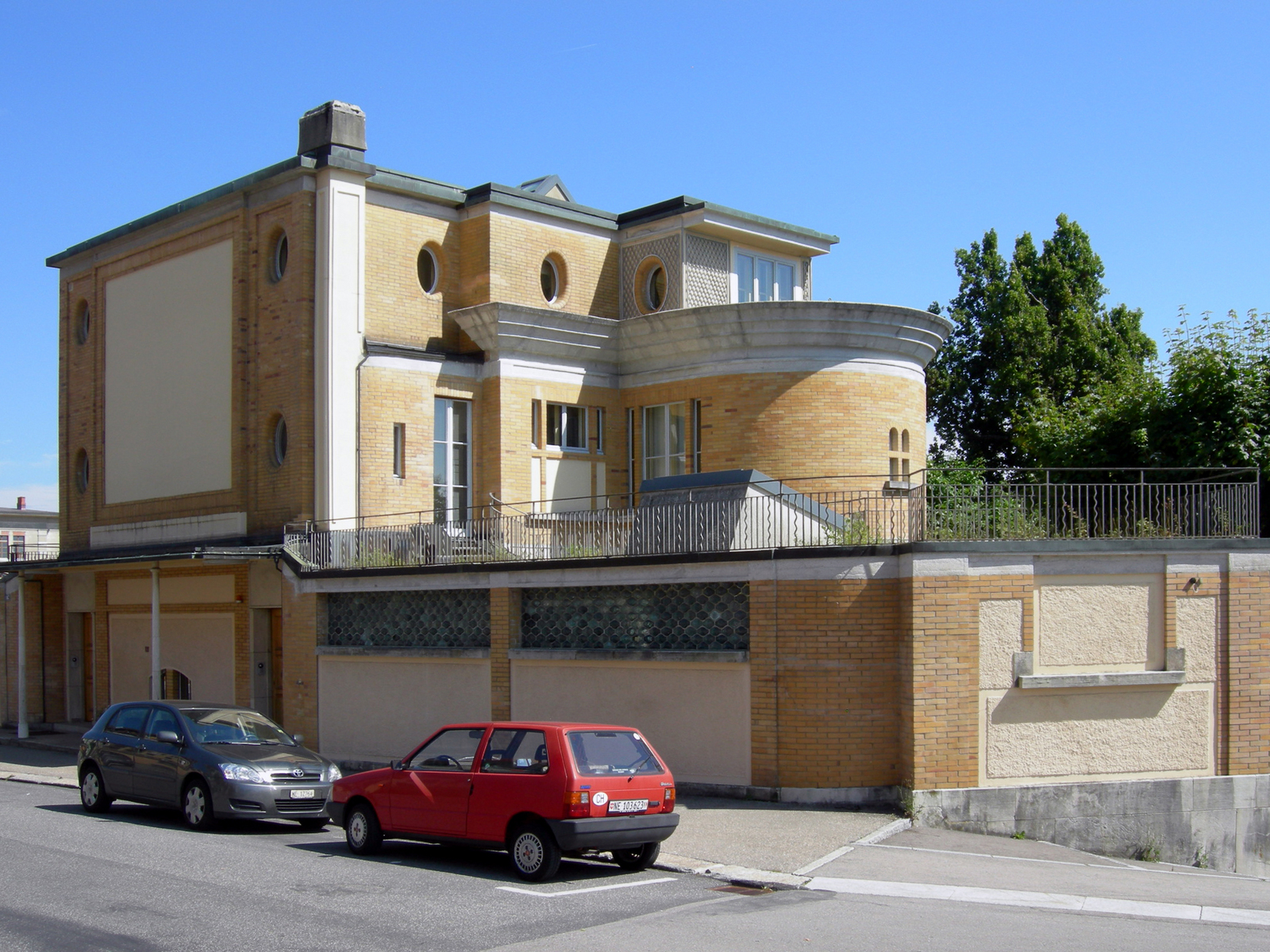
Villa Anatole Schwob

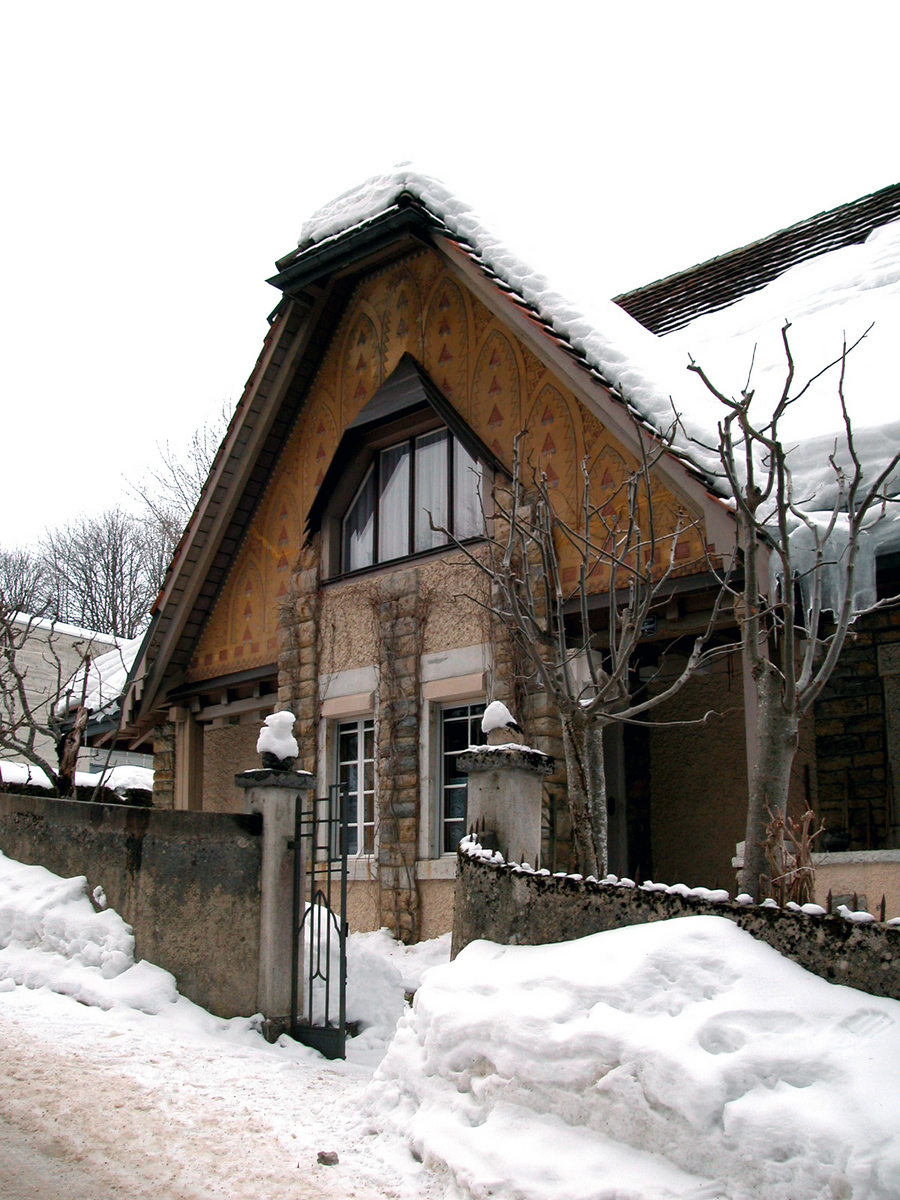
Villa Fallet

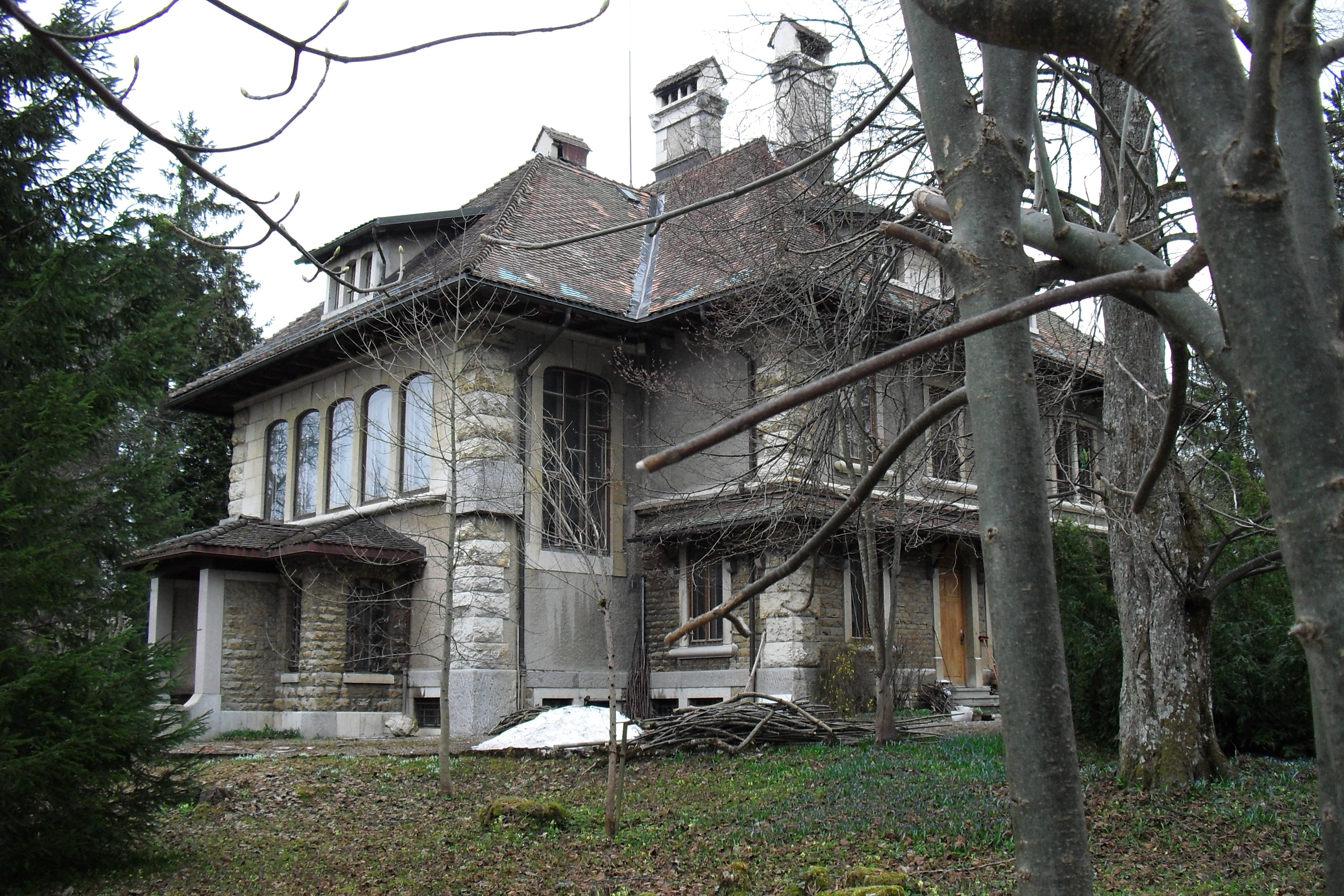
Villa Gallet

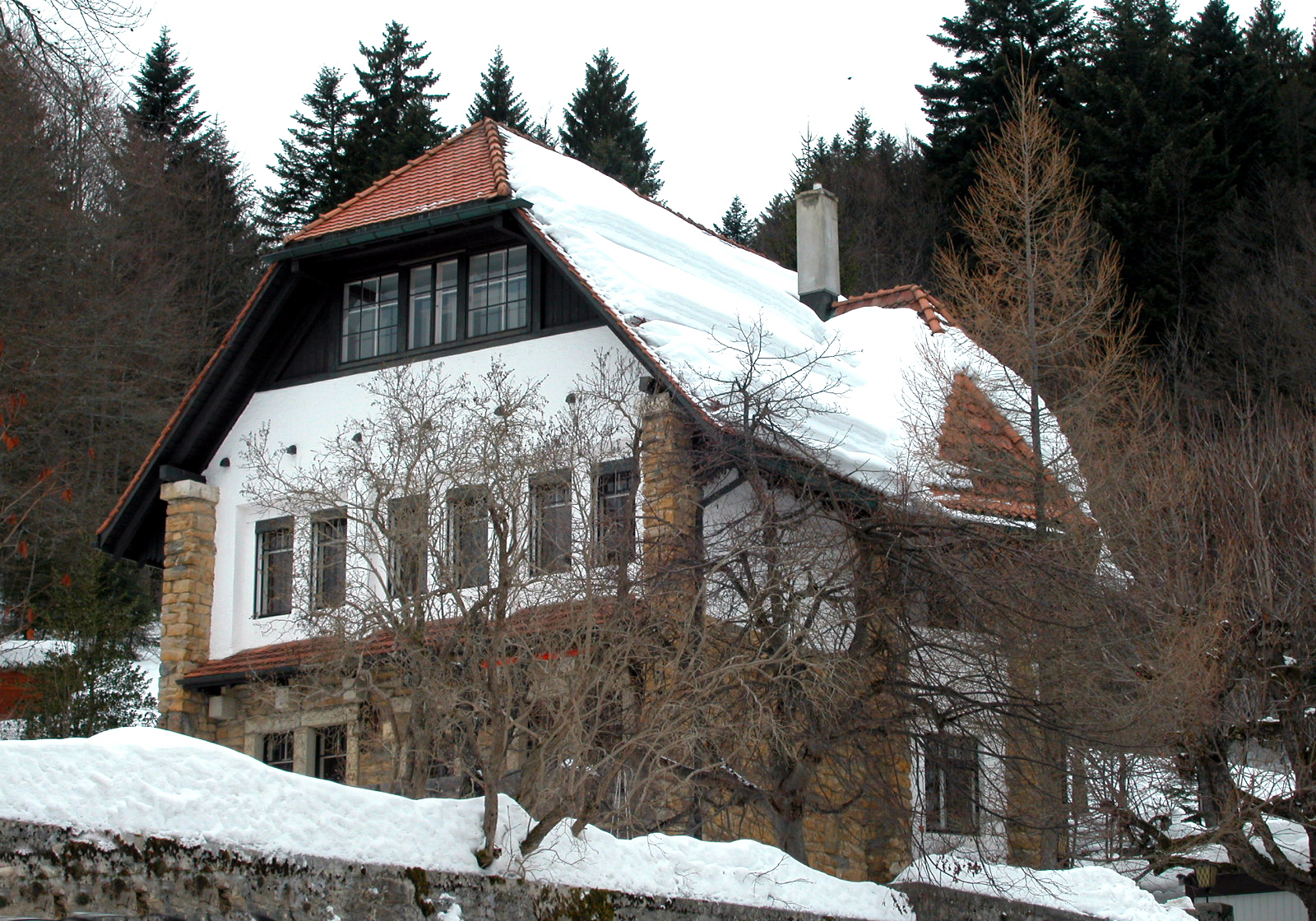
Villa Jaquemet

== Politics ==
In the 2007 federal election the most popular party was the SP which received 28.18% of the vote. The next three most popular parties were the SVP (25.73%), the PdA Party (14.2%) and the Green Party (12.03%). In the federal election, a total of 10,293 votes were cast, and the voter turnout was 47.1%.

== Economy ==
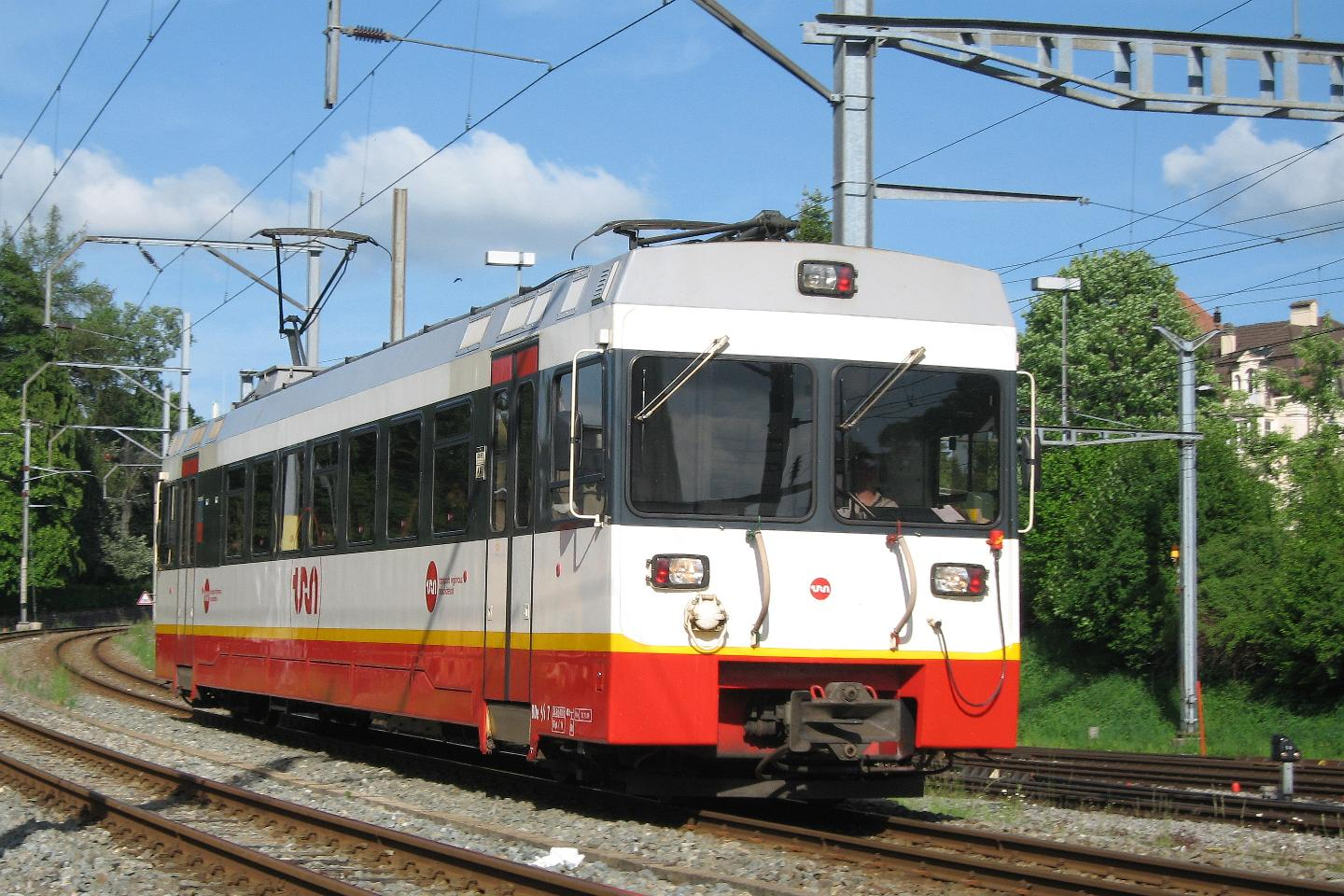
Regional train at La Chaux-de-Fonds

As of 2010, La Chaux-de-Fonds had an unemployment rate of 8.2%. As of 2008, there were 260 people employed in the primary economic sector and about 95 businesses involved in this sector. 10,594 people were employed in the secondary sector and there were 550 businesses in this sector. 11,813 people were employed in the tertiary sector, with 1,290 businesses in this sector. There were 17,870 residents of the municipality who were employed in some capacity, of which women made up 46.1% of the workforce.

In 2008 the total number of full-time equivalent jobs was 19,692. The number of jobs in the primary sector was 208, of which 198 were in agriculture and 10 were in forestry or lumber production. The number of jobs in the secondary sector was 10,153 of which 9,063 or (89.3%) were in manufacturing and 903 (8.9%) were in construction. The number of jobs in the tertiary sector was 9,331. In the tertiary sector; 2,287 or 24.5% were in wholesale or retail sales or the repair of motor vehicles, 680 or 7.3% were in the movement and storage of goods, 571 or 6.1% were in a hotel or restaurant, 150 or 1.6% were in the information industry, 372 or 4.0% were the insurance or financial industry, 573 or 6.1% were technical professionals or scientists, 816 or 8.7% were in education and 2,078 or 22.3% were in health care.

In 2000, there were 8,916 workers who commuted into the municipality and 3,481 workers who commuted away. The municipality is a net importer of workers, with about 2.6 workers entering the municipality for every one leaving. About 19.3% of the workforce coming into La Chaux-de-Fonds are coming from outside Switzerland, while 0.1% of the locals commute out of Switzerland for work. Of the working population, 21.4% used public transportation to get to work, and 52.8% used a private car.

== Religion ==
Religion in La Chaux-de-Fonds, 31.12.2014
1. Roman Catholic (43.4%)
2. Protestant (27.1%)
3. Other Christian (1.20%)
4. Jewish (0.30%)
5. Islam (7.80%)
6. Other religion (3.20%)
7. Undeclared (1.90%)
8. Unaffiliated (15.1%)

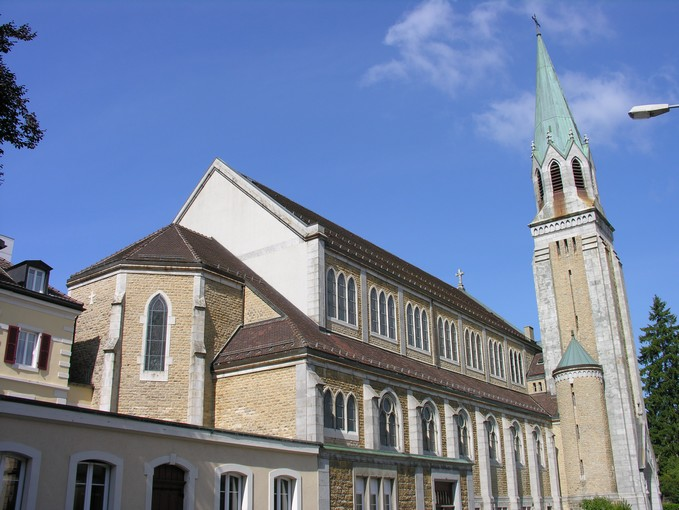
Neo-Gothic Sacré-Cœur church

According to the 2000 census, 11,320 or 30.6% of the city's inhabitants were Roman Catholic, while 10,258 or 27.7% belonged to the Swiss Reformed Church. Of the rest of the population, there were 205 members of an Orthodox church (or about 0.55% of the population), 300 individuals (or about 0.81% of the population) who belonged to the Christian Catholic Church, and 2,365 individuals (or about 6.39% of the population) who belonged to another Christian church. There were 129 individuals (or about 0.35% of the population) who were Jewish, and 1,369 (or about 3.70% of the population) who were Muslims. There were 90 individuals who were Buddhist, 83 individuals who were Hindu and 45 individuals who belonged to another church. 10,059 (or about 27.17% of the population) belonged to no church, were agnostic or atheist, and 1,960 individuals (or about 5.30% of the population) did not answer the question.

== Education ==
In La Chaux-de-Fonds about 12,347 or (33.4%) of the population have completed non-mandatory upper secondary education, and 3,943 or (10.7%) have completed additional higher education (either university or a Fachhochschule). Of the 3,943 who completed tertiary schooling, 51.7% were Swiss men, 28.5% were Swiss women, 12.0% were non-Swiss men and 7.7% were non-Swiss women.

In the canton of Neuchâtel most municipalities provide two years of non-mandatory kindergarten, followed by five years of mandatory primary education. The next four years of mandatory secondary education are provided at thirteen larger secondary schools, which many students travel out of their home municipality to attend. The primary school in La Chaux-de-Fonds is combined with Les Planchettes. During the 2010–11 school year, there were 38 kindergarten classes with a total of 728 students in La Chaux-de-Fonds. In the same year, there were 113 primary classes with a total of 2,042 students.

As of 2000, there were 754 students in La Chaux-de-Fonds who came from another municipality, while 644 residents attended schools outside the municipality.

La Chaux-de-Fonds is home to two libraries, the Bibliothèque de la Ville and the Haute école Arc – Arts appliqués. There was a combined total (as of 2008) of 670,267 books or other media in the libraries, and in the same year, a total of 342,720 items were loaned out.

== Culture ==
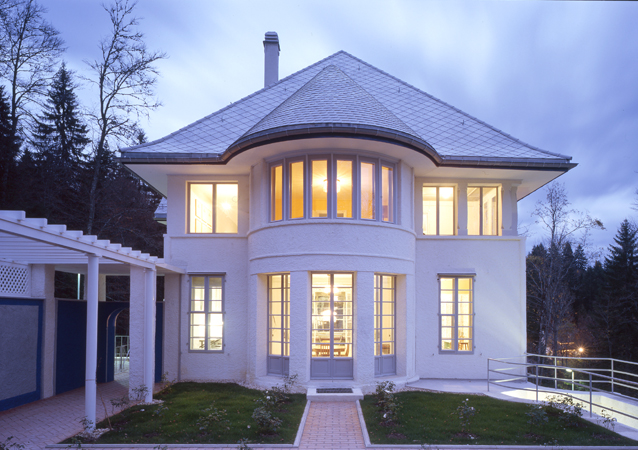
Villa Jeanneret-Perret (Maison Blanche) by Le Corbusier

La Chaux-de-Fonds is the home of the Musée International d'Horlogerie (International Museum of Watch Making), originally constructed with funds donated by the Gallet watchmaking family in 1899. The Museum is considered as an important showcase for the history of the timekeeping arts.

Art Nouveau had a great influence on architecture and culture in the city during the late 19th century.

The daily newspaper L'Impartial has been published in La Chaux-de-Fonds since 1880.

The Wakker Prize was granted to La-Chaux-de-Fonds in 1994.

=== Sports ===
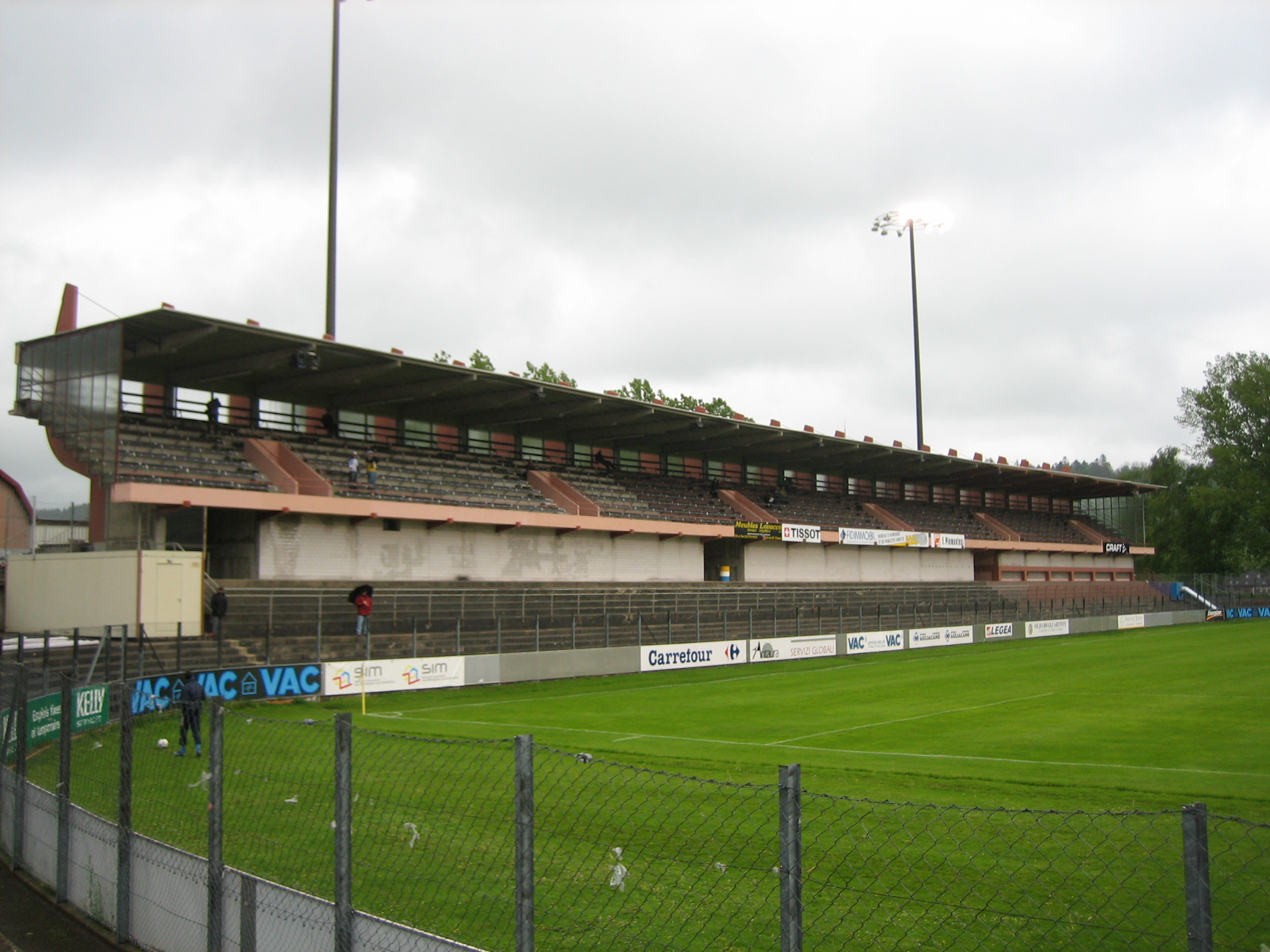
Stade de la Charrière

La Chaux-de-fonds is home to HC La Chaux-de-Fonds, a professional ice hockey team that competes in the Swiss League (SL), the second-highest league in Switzerland. Their home arena is the 7,200-seat Patinoire des Mélèzes. The team had a successful stint in the National League (NL) where they played for a few years and won the championship six times in a row, from 1968 to 1973.

La Chaux-de-Fonds also has an amateur football team, FC La Chaux-de-Fonds.

== Transport ==
The municipality is located at the junction of four railway lines and has six different railway stations within its borders. The primary station is La Chaux-de-Fonds, others include La Cibourg, La Chaux-de-Fonds-Est, La Chaux-de-Fonds-Grenier, Le Reymond, and Le Crêt-du-Locle.

The city is also served by Les Eplatures Airport and the La Chaux-de-Fonds trolleybus system.

The nearest airports to the city are Bern Airport, located 83 km (52 mi) south east, EuroAirport Basel-Mulhouse-Freiburg, located 139 km (86 mi) north east, and Geneva Airport, located about 139 km (86 mi) south west of La Chaux-de-Fonds.

== Climate ==
Climate data for La Chaux-de-Fonds, elevation 1,017 m (3,337 ft), (1991–2020)
Month	Jan	Feb	Mar	Apr	May	Jun	Jul	Aug	Sep	Oct	Nov	Dec	Year
Mean daily maximum °C (°F)	3.0 (37.4)	3.6 (38.5)	7.1 (44.8)	11.0 (51.8)	15.0 (59.0)	18.9 (66.0)	20.8 (69.4)	20.7 (69.3)	16.6 (61.9)	12.8 (55.0)	7.2 (45.0)	3.8 (38.8)	11.7 (53.1)
Daily mean °C (°F)	−1.0 (30.2)	−0.7 (30.7)	2.6 (36.7)	6.1 (43.0)	10.2 (50.4)	13.8 (56.8)	15.6 (60.1)	15.4 (59.7)	11.5 (52.7)	8.0 (46.4)	3.1 (37.6)	−0.1 (31.8)	7.0 (44.6)
Mean daily minimum °C (°F)	−5.4 (22.3)	−5.4 (22.3)	−2.1 (28.2)	1.1 (34.0)	4.9 (40.8)	8.5 (47.3)	10.2 (50.4)	9.9 (49.8)	6.7 (44.1)	3.4 (38.1)	−1.1 (30.0)	−4.1 (24.6)	2.2 (36.0)
Average precipitation mm (inches)	106.6 (4.20)	93.0 (3.66)	98.9 (3.89)	96.1 (3.78)	130.9 (5.15)	119.3 (4.70)	131.1 (5.16)	131.2 (5.17)	114.2 (4.50)	117.2 (4.61)	117.7 (4.63)	132.5 (5.22)	1,388.7 (54.67)
Average snowfall cm (inches)	54.1 (21.3)	61.3 (24.1)	36.0 (14.2)	13.1 (5.2)	1.0 (0.4)	0.0 (0.0)	0.0 (0.0)	0.0 (0.0)	0.0 (0.0)	3.0 (1.2)	28.8 (11.3)	55.8 (22.0)	253.1 (99.6)
Average precipitation days (≥ 1.0 mm)	12.3	11.5	11.4	11.7	14.4	12.8	12.5	11.6	10.4	12.3	11.9	13.6	146.4
Average snowy days (≥ 1.0 cm)	8.9	9.6	6.4	2.6	0.2	0.0	0.0	0.0	0.0	0.5	5.1	9.2	42.5
Average relative humidity (%)	82	79	75	73	75	75	74	76	80	81	82	83	78
Mean monthly sunshine hours	95.2	106.2	144.0	159.7	170.6	192.2	214.8	205.3	160.1	133.6	92.5	79.7	1,753.9
Percentage possible sunshine	38	40	42	43	40	45	50	52	47	44	37	35	44
Source 1: NOAA
Source 2: MeteoSwiss

In July 2023, La Chaux-de-Fonds experienced a severe storm, resulting in one fatality and approximately 40 injuries. The storm, characterized by powerful winds reaching speeds of up to 217 km/h, inflicted significant damage to the town's infrastructure, leading to estimated repair costs of CHF 70-90 million. The destructive winds tore roofs off buildings, toppled trees, and impacted thousands of structures and vehicles. Meteorological analysis suggested that the wind pattern resembled a downburst rather than a tornado, a weather phenomenon caused by a sudden cooling of air within a thunderstorm.

== Notable people ==
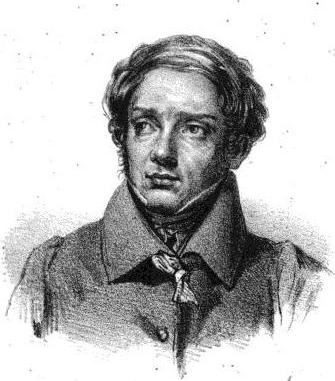
Léopold Robert

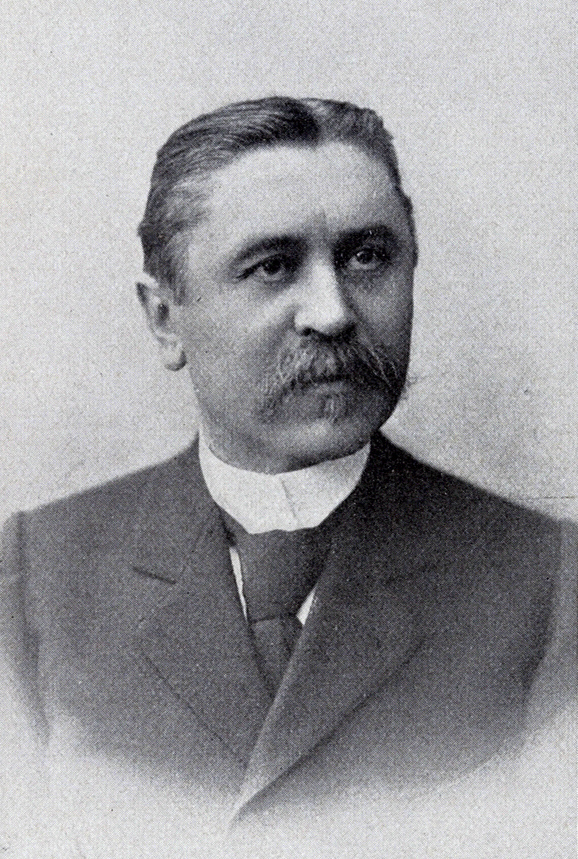
Numa Droz

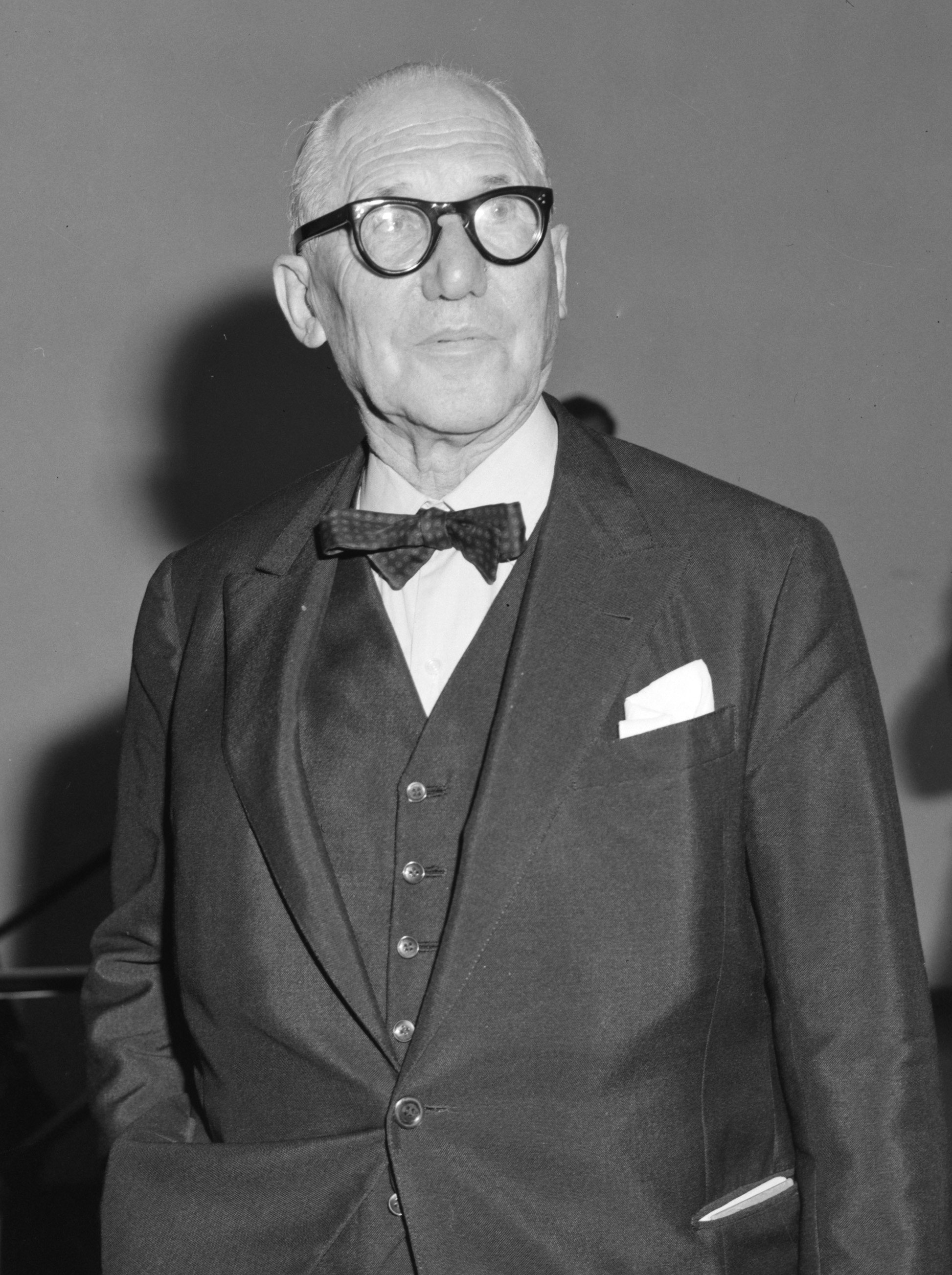
Le Corbusier, 1964

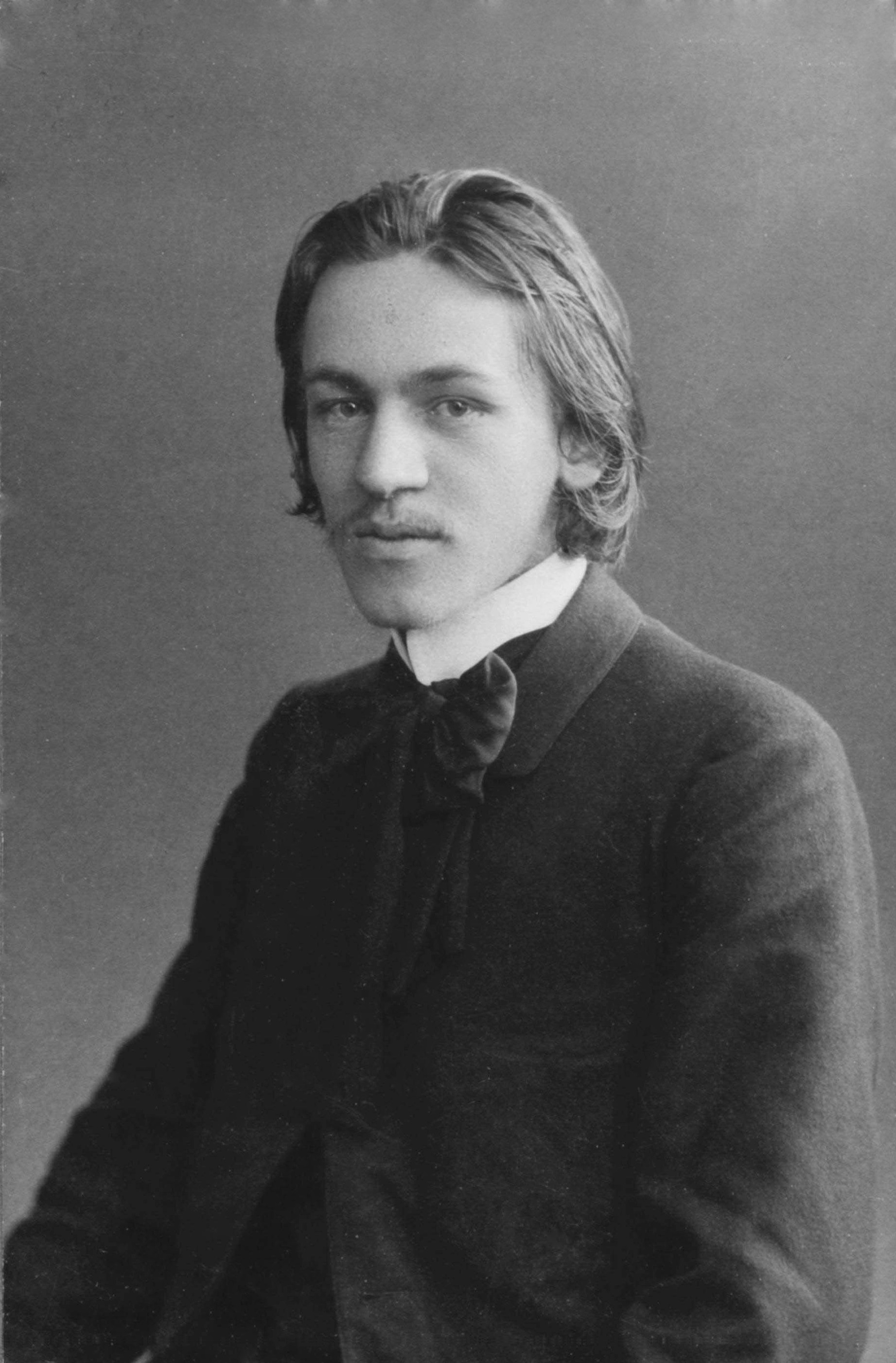
Blaise Cendrars, c.1907

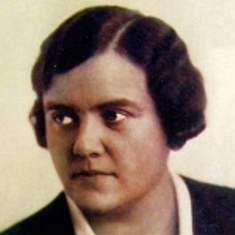
Adrienne von Speyr, c. 1930

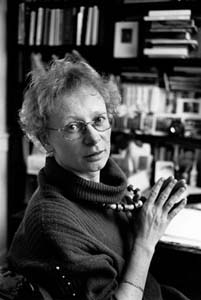
Anne-Lise Grobéty, 1993

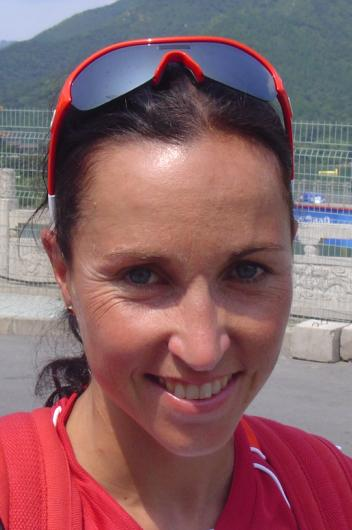
Magali Di Marco Messmer, 2008

=== 18th century ===
- Pierre Jaquet-Droz (1721–1790), mathematician, watchmaker and machine designer
- Jean-Pierre Droz (1746–1823), medalist and minter
- Heinrich Franz Brandt (1789–1845), Swiss-born medal designer
- Louis Léopold Robert (1794–1835), painter
- Fritz Courvoisier (1799–1854), watchmaker, military man and politician

=== 19th century ===
- Aimé Humbert-Droz (1819–1900), Swiss politician, traveller and educator; President of the Swiss Council of States 1856
- Léon Gallet (1832–1899), watchmaker, entrepreneur, philanthropist, and past family patriarch of Gallet & Co., watchmakers
- Elise, Countess of Edla (born Elise Friedericke Hensler) (1836–1929), Swiss-born American actress and singer and the morganatic second wife of King Ferdinand II of Portugal
- Numa Droz (1844–1899), politician and Bundesrat (FDP)
- Paul Charles Dubois (1848–1918), Swiss neuropathologist
- Oscar Tschirky (1866–1950), Swiss-American restaurateur who was maître d'hôtel of the Waldorf-Astoria Hotel in New York, emigrated in 1883
- Jules Jacot-Guillarmod (1868–1925), Swiss physician, mountaineer and photographer
- Paul Ditisheim (1868–1945), Swiss watchmaker, inventor and industrialist
- Theophil Friedrich Christen (1873–1920), mathematician, physician, economist and a doctor
- Vladimir Lenin (1870–1924), lived in La Chaux-de-Fonds during his Swiss exile
- Louis Kollros (1878–1959), Swiss mathematician and academic
- Louis Chevrolet (1878–1941), Swiss race car driver, co-founder of the Chevrolet Motor Car Company in the US in 1911
- Suzanne Girault (1882–1973), Swiss-born French politician, co-leader of the French Communist Party
- Arthur Chevrolet (1884–1946), Swiss race car driver and automobile manufacturer
- Georges Sauser-Hall (1884–1966), scholar of comparative and international law
- Le Corbusier (1887–1965), Swiss-French architect, designer, painter, urban planner, writer, and a pioneer of modern architecture, born here as Charles-Edouard Jeanneret
- Blaise Cendrars (1887–1961), poet and novelist of the European modernist movement, born as Frédéric-Louis Sauser
- Theophil Spoerri (1890–1974), Swiss writer and academic with a strong religious element
- Jules Humbert-Droz (1891–1971), politician, Communist International, KPS & SP
- Alfred Stucky (1892–1969), Swiss engineer specialising in concrete dams
- Eugénie Droz (1893–1976), Swiss romance scholar, editor, publisher and writer
- René Richard (1895–1982), Swiss-born Canadian painter of semi-abstract landscapes of the Canadian wilderness, emigrated 1909
- Charles Barraud (1897–1997), Swiss painter
- François Barraud (1899–1934), Swiss painter

=== 20th century ===
- Aimé Barraud (1902–1954), Swiss painter, part of Neue Sachlichkeit (New Objectivity)
- René Ferté (1903–1958), Swiss silent movie actor in French cinema
- Adrienne von Speyr (1902–1967), Swiss Catholic physician, writer, theologian, mystic and stigmatist
- Pierre Graber (1908–2003), politician and Bundesrat (SP)
- Georges Piroué (1920–2005), writer
- Monsignor Pierre Mamie (1920–2008), Roman Catholic bishop of the Diocese of Lausanne, Geneva and Fribourg 1970–1995
- Armand Borel (1923–2003), Swiss mathematician, worked in algebraic topology and co-created the contemporary theory of linear algebraic groups
- Pierre Aubert (1927–2016), lawyer, politician and Bundesrat
- François Pantillon (born 1928), composer and conductor
- Daniel Pauly (born 1946), French-born marine biologist and fisheries scientist
- Grégoire Müller (born 1947), contemporary Swiss figurative painter and writer, lives in La Chaux-de-Fonds
- Anne-Lise Grobéty (1949–2010), French-language Swiss journalist and author of short stories, poetry and radio plays
- Franck Muller (born 1958), Swiss watchmaker of watches of €38,000 average price
- Anita Porchet (born 1961), Swiss watch enameller
- Nuria Gorrite (born 1970), grew up in Morges, president of the Council of State of Vaud
- Stefano Macaluso (born 1975), Italian businessman, has lived in La Chaux-de-Fonds since 2003, works with watches
- Samuel Blaser (born 1981), Swiss trombonist and composer

=== Sport ===
- Georges Antenen (1903–1979), Swiss cyclist, competed at the 1924 Summer Olympics
- Pierre-André Flückiger (1919-??), Swiss sports shooter, competed at the 1952 and 1960 Summer Olympics
- Willy Kernen (1929–2009), Swiss footballer, earned 41 caps for the Switzerland national football team and participated in three World Cups
- Charles Antenen (1929–2000), footballer, 472 team games and 56 games for the national side
- Nicole Petignat (born 1966), Swiss former football referee
- Magali Messmer (born 1971), professional elite triathlete, bronze medallist at the 2008 Summer Olympics
- Olivia Nobs (born 1982), Swiss snowboarder, bronze medallist at the 2010 Winter Olympics
- Sabrina Jaquet (born 1987), Swiss Badminton player, competed at the 2012 Summer Olympics

== Watch companies ==
Many watch companies started in La Chaux de Fonds:

- Ardorextra
- Ball Watch Company, Webb C. Ball
- Bouchet-Lassale SA, in 1978
- Corum
- Cyma Watches, 1862 – Schwob Frères and Co.; 1892 – Cyma Watch Company
- Ebel, by Eugene Blum and Alice Levy, in 1911
- Eberhard & Co., by George-Emile Eberhard, in 1887
- Gallet & Co., by Julien Gallet, in 1826
- Girard-Perregaux, by Constantin Girard and Marie Perregaux, in 1856
- Heuer Leonidas, now TAG Heuer, by Edouard Heuer, in 1860
- Invicta Watch Group, by Raphael Picard, in 1837
- Marathon Watch Co., in 1904, founded as Weinsturm Watch
- Movado, by Achilles Ditesheim, in 1881
- Omega SA, in 1848
- Rolex trademark, registered by Hans Wilsdorf, in 1908; his company, Wilsdorf and Davis, London, was later renamed Rolex Watch Company, Geneva and Biel/Bienne
- Rotary, by Moise Dreyfuss, in 1895
- Solvil et Titus, by Paul Ditisheim, in 1892
- Venus by Paul Arthur Schwarz and Olga Etienne, in 1902
- Vulcain by Maurice Ditisheim, in 1858

== Twin town ==
La Chaux-de-Fonds is twinned with:

- Frameries, Belgium

== Notes and references ==
- "La Chaux-de-Fonds" in German, French and Italian in the online Historical Dictionary of Switzerland.
