= Paul Ditisheim =

Swiss watchmaker (1868–1945)

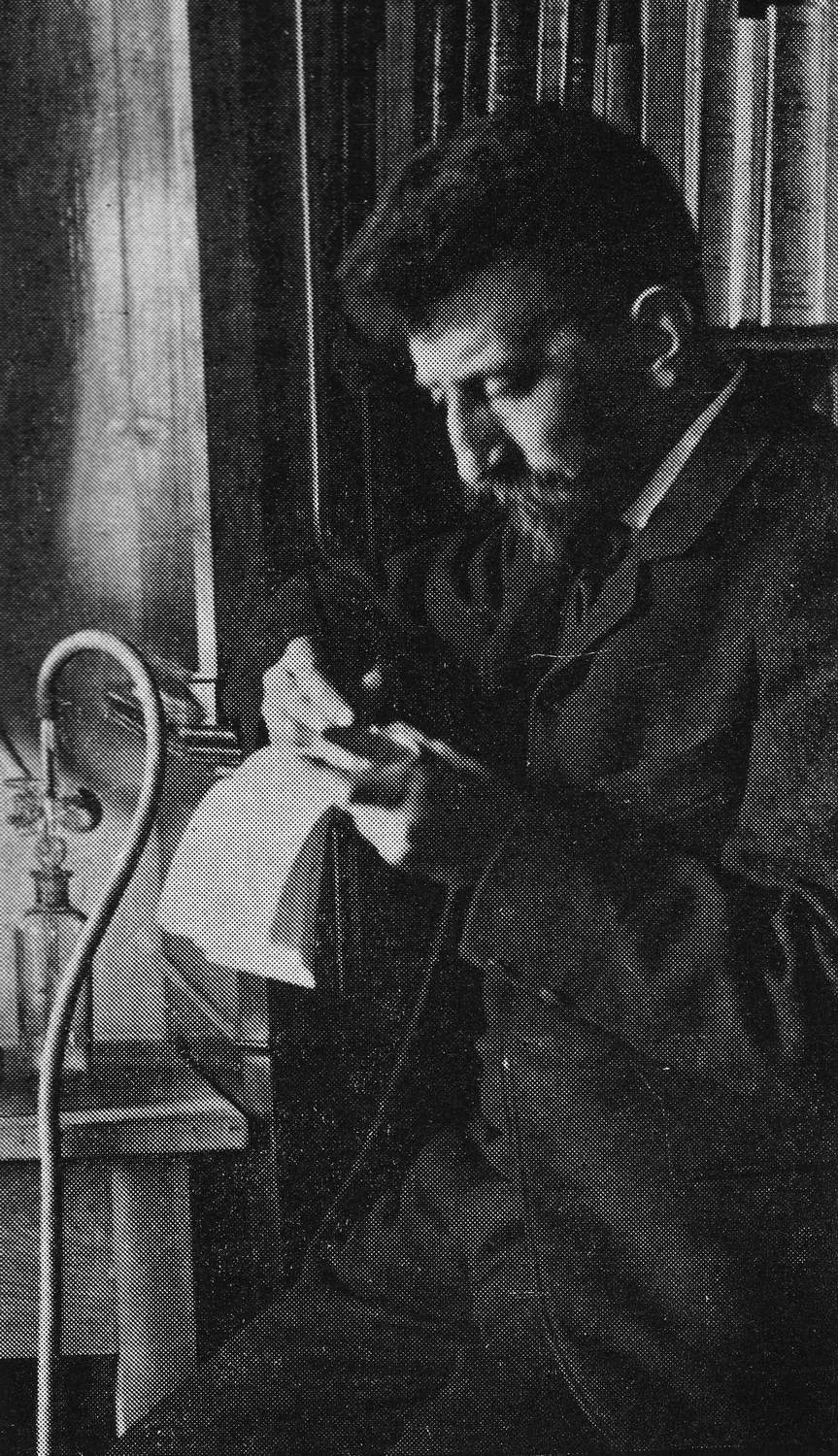
Paul Ditisheim

Paul Ditisheim (1868–1945) was a Swiss watchmaker, inventor and industrialist.

== Early years ==
Paul Ditisheim was born into a wealthy family in 1868 in La Chaux-de-Fonds, Switzerland. The Ditisheims belonged to a group of industrialist families that were part of the Swiss watch industry at the time. His father, Gaspard, and uncle, Maurice Ditisheim (or Ditesheim), were the founders of the watch company Vulcain, which was one of the many watch companies started by Jewish families in the region.

Ditisheim studied at the Ecole Industrielle and the Horological School of La Chaux-de-Fonds. He worked for his family’s company, Vulcain, until 1892 when he founded his own company, Solvil et Titus.

== Innovation and success ==
Paul Ditisheim developed a new generation of chronometers, improving them through his studies on the impact of atmospheric pressure and magnetic fields. He invented the affix balance. By 1903, his watches had won awards in the Kew and Neuchâtel Observatories contests. In 1912, he won the World’s Chronometric Record of the Royal Kew Observatory.

== Later life ==
In the 1920s, Paul Ditisheim handed over the Solvil et Titus and Paul Ditisheim brands to Swiss entrepreneur and captain of industry, Paul Bernard Vogel. Vogel, heir to a family of industrialists and married to the heiress of the prominent Eberard family, was also a member of the Swiss watch industry’s elite. Vogel moved the company headquarters to Geneva, which increased the company's size and led to the expansion of the business throughout the world.

In 1925, after selling his company, Ditisheim left La Chaux-de-Fonds and moved to Paris, where he collaborated with an earth oils chemist to research and develop watch and clock oils. Paul Ditisheim was still in Paris when France was invaded by the Germans during World War II. Persecuted for being Jewish, he fled to Nice, where he lived until a year before his death.

He died in Geneva, Switzerland in 1945 at the age of 76.
