= Paul Bernard Vogel =

Swiss industrialist

Paul Bernard Vogel was a Swiss industrialist who owned the Solvil et Titus watch manufacture.

== Business life ==
In 1930, Vogel acquired the Solvil et Titus and Paul Ditisheim brands from their founder Paul Ditisheim.

Vogel moved the company's headquarters to Geneva where he became the chairman of the Salon Montres et Bijoux (the Watch and Jewelry's Fair), the most prestigious association of Swiss watch manufacturers and jewelers of the time.

By the 1950s Vogel, feeling the shift in consumer's habits, decided to divide its brands into two. For one brand, the company kept producing the luxury watches for which it was famous. For the other brand, it started producing lower-cost watches that fit the emerging mass consumption markets. Thanks to this new orientation, Solvil et Titus was instrumental in the development of mechanical and electronic watches.

In 1968, Vogel took the lead of the newly founded Societe des Gardes-Temps SA, a conglomerate of low cost watch manufacturers which was the world's third largest watchmaking company of the time and had a true international dimension (it acquired the American Waltham Watch Company and signed a licensing agreement in 1973 with Elgin Watch – then Swiss watchmaking's biggest foreign investment.

Vogel had foreseen the necessities of broadening the market for watches and of creating an international distribution system and consequently decided to expand Solvil et Titus activities overseas. In the 1970s, surfing on the Asian Tigers economic boom, he sent his son, Paul Vogel, to grow the family business operations in the Asian market. The operation was successful and Solvil became one of the most popular brand in Eastern Asia.

== Private life ==
Born in La Chaux-de-Fonds, the historic birthplace of watchmaking industry, the son of a prestigious family of industrialists, he married Suzanne Eberhard, the heiress of the prominent Eberhard family. The couple was part of the small social circle of industrialist families that led the Swiss watch industry of the time and they both were prominent members of Geneva's high society. The Vogels were renowned for the various social events they organized.

Paul Bernard was a collector and sponsor of the arts. His extensive art collection comprised works of such foremost artists as Picasso, Matisse, Kees van Dongen, Vuillard, Degas or Caillebotte.

Another of Vogel's passions was orchids. He travelled the world to bring orchid seeds back to Geneva where he cultivated them in a complex of climate-specialised greenhouses in the garden of his lakeside mansion, Le Breuil, in Versoix, Geneva. The orchids were sold in a luxury flower shop named after the estates that still exist today.
