= Mondaine =

Swiss watch manufacturer

Mondaine Watch Ltd.
- Type: Private
- Industry: Watchmaking
- Founded: 1951; 75 years ago in Pfäffikon, Zürich
- Founder: Erwin Bernheim
- Headquarters: Pfäffikon, Switzerland
- Area served: Worldwide
- Key people: Niels Møller (CEO)
- Products: Watches & clocks
- Subsidiaries: Luminox, M-WATCH, Pierre Cardin
- Website: mondaine.com

Mondaine Watch Ltd. is a Swiss family-owned watchmaker and manufacturer based in Pfäffikon, Switzerland. It was founded in 1951 by Swiss businessman Erwin Bernheim. The company is best known for a line of watches based on the Swiss railway clock designed by Hans Hilfiker. They have produced these watches since 1986, with them being the exclusive licensee for the Swiss Federal Railways' (SBB) clock face design.

== History ==
=== Foundation and early years ===
Mondaine was founded by Erwin Bernheim in 1951, following the takeover of 1928 establishment Neuchatel Watch.

=== Swiss railway clock licence ===
In 1986, Mondaine gained the commercial licence to the Swiss railway clockface from SBB. The production of watches based on this design became the company's most recognisable product line.

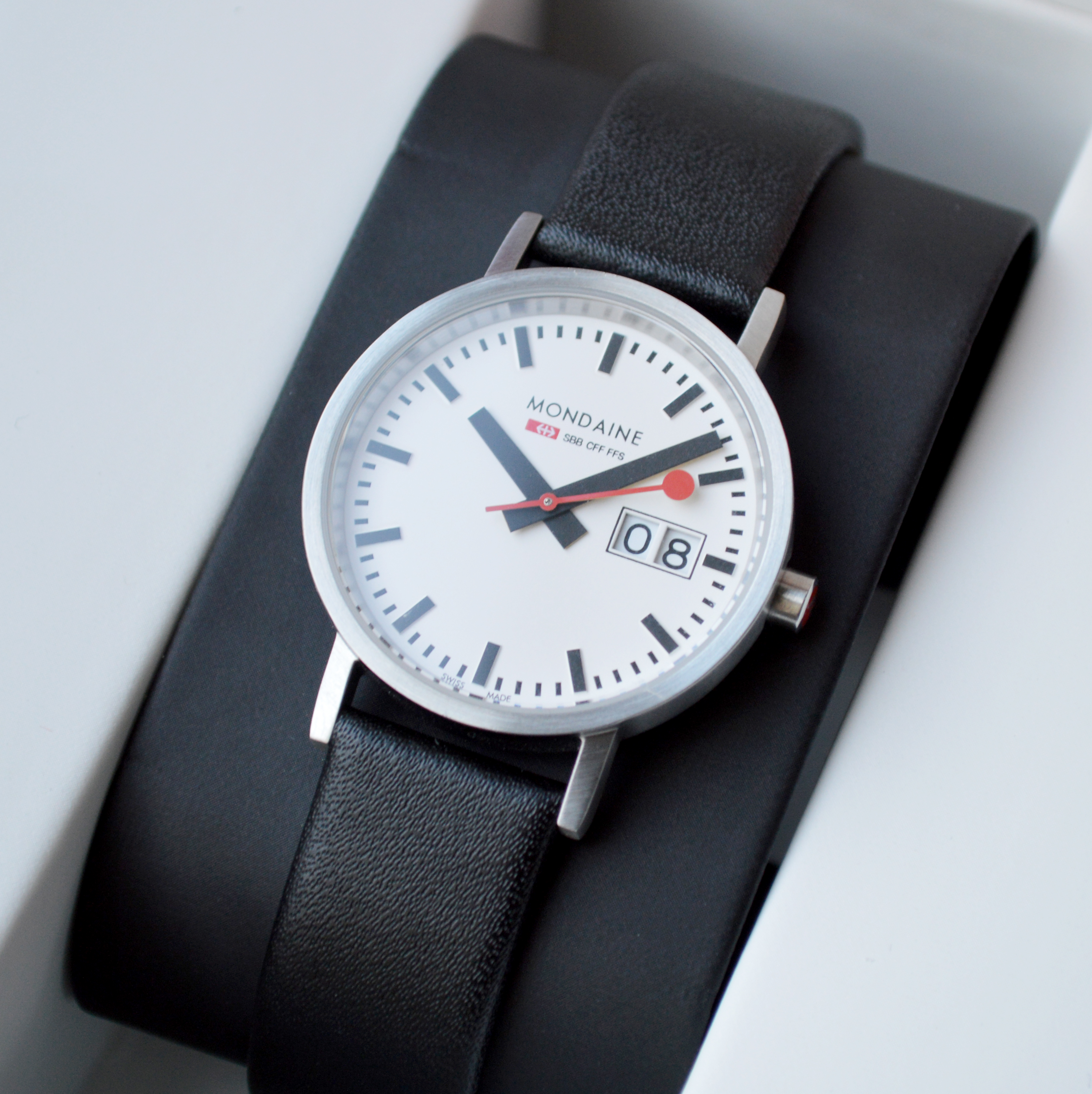
The Mondaine Classic 33mm Automatic watch (ref. 30008)

=== Recent developments ===
Mondaine stopped using the 58 second marker design in 2001, switching to the traditional 60 second markers.

In 2013, a redesigned model was launched under the name stop2go. In keeping with how the movement itself works, the crown is shaped like a rocker switch that you flip back and forth instead of winding.

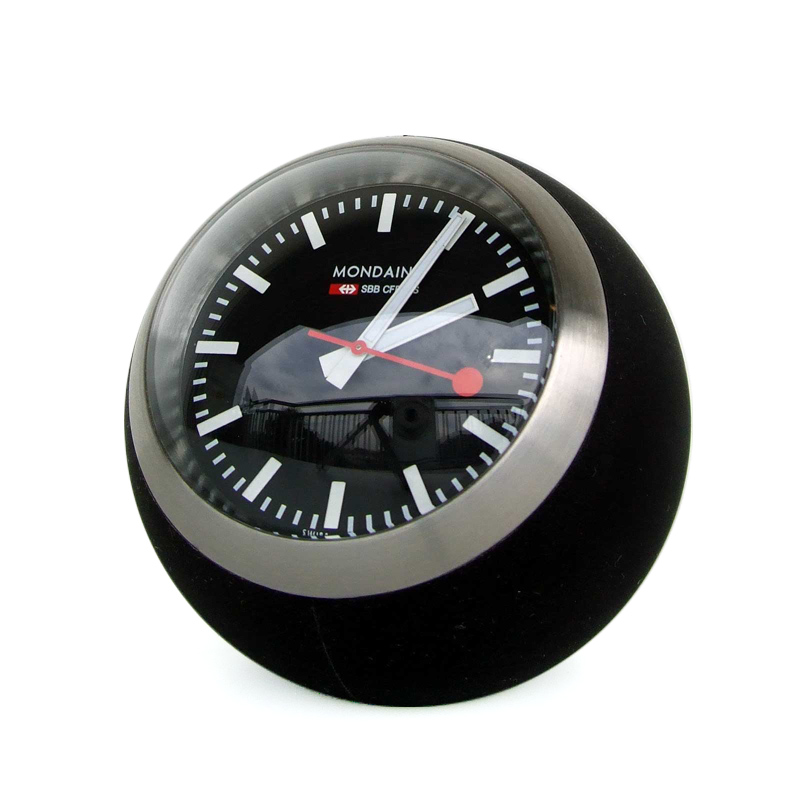
The Mondaine Globe Clock (ref. 30335)

== Design ==
The watchface design that Mondaine has become best known for is the SBB's Swiss railway clock design, as created by engineer Hans Hilfiker alongside with Swiss watchmakers Moser-Baer. The watches were unlike others as the face spread 58 seconds over the 360 degrees (rather than the usual 60 seconds), the second hand comes to a complete stop at the 12 numeral for two seconds, giving the illusion that time has stopped. This however was changed in 2001 when Mondaine returned to the traditional 60 second format. Then, the minute hand advances one step and the second hand starts a new cycle. The red second hand in the shape of the baton used by train dispatch staff was added in 1953 and was the last alteration to bring the design to the way it looks today.
