= Station building =

Main building of a passenger railway station

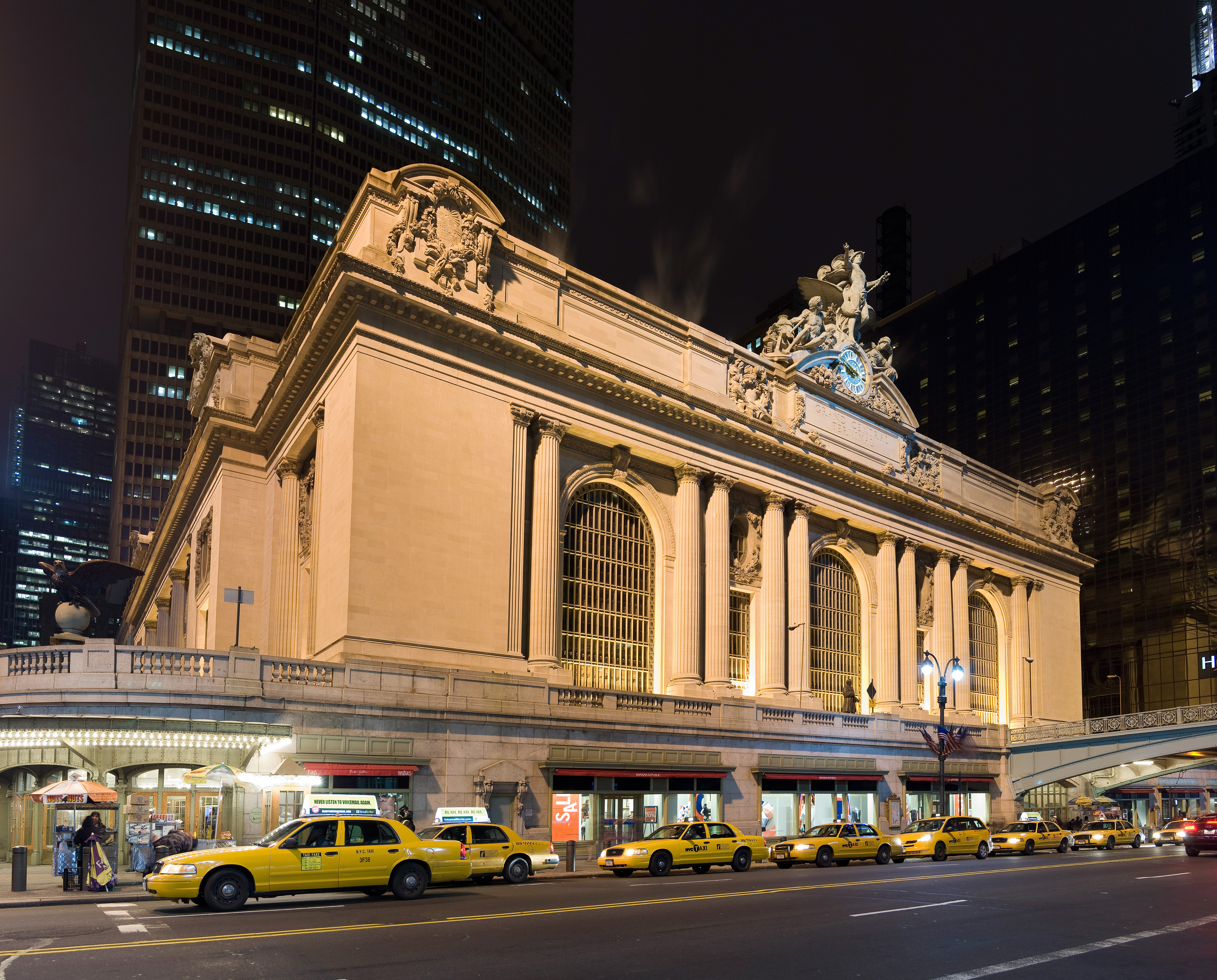
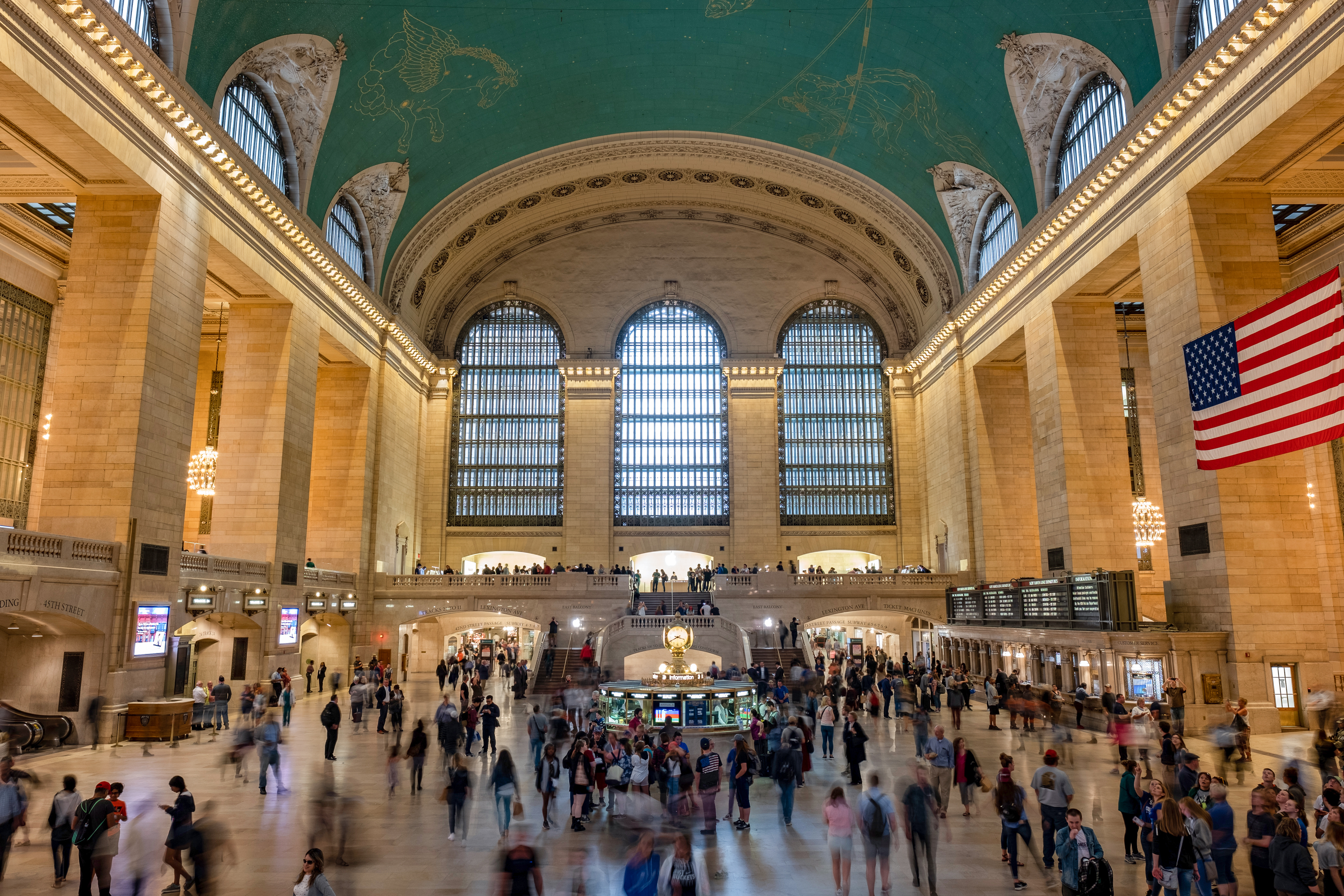
The station building (left) of New York City's Grand Central Terminal includes spaces like its Main Concourse (right).

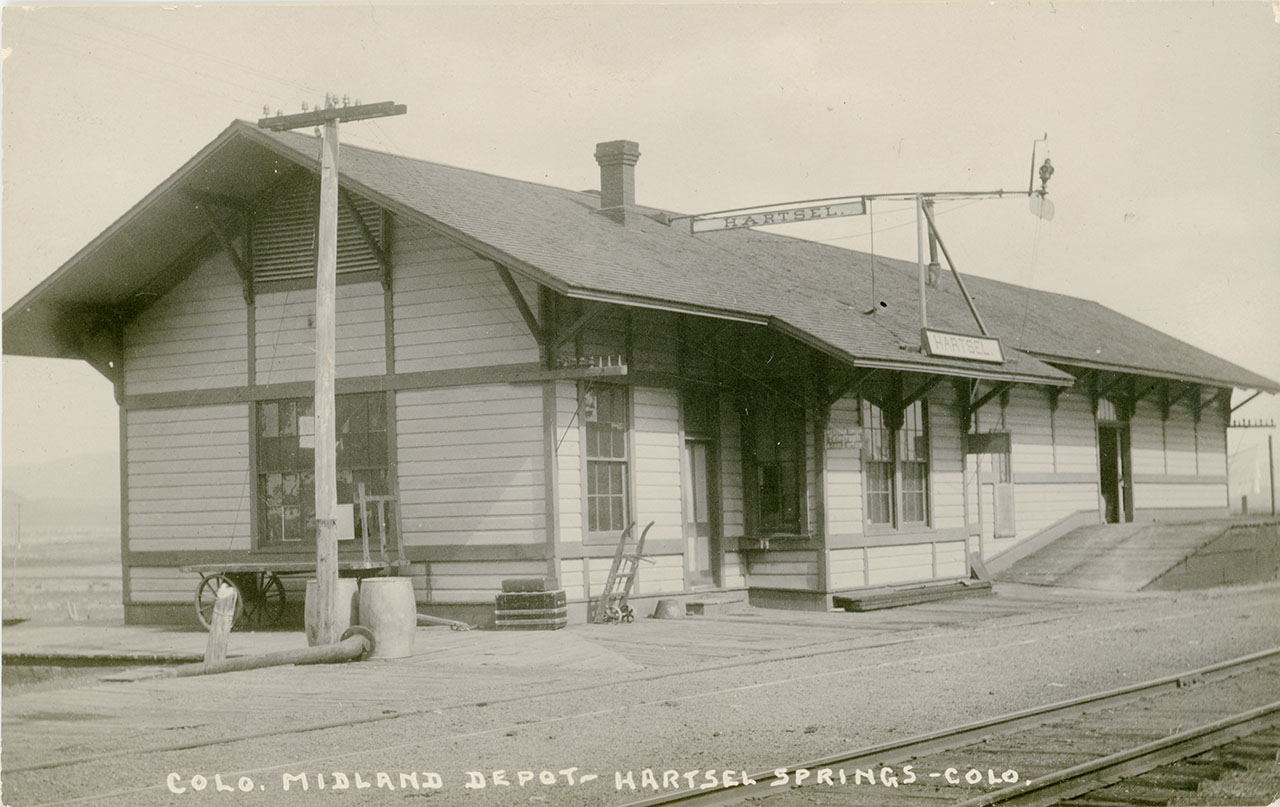
Train depot in Hartsel, Colorado

A station building, also known as a head house, is the main building of a passenger railway station. It is typically used principally to provide services to passengers. A station building is a component of a station, which can include tracks, platforms, an overpass or underpass, and a train shed.

Normally, a station building will be of adequate size for the type of service that is to be performed. It may range from a simple single-storey building with limited services to passengers to a large building with many indoor spaces providing many services. Some station buildings are of monumental proportions and styles. Both in the past and in recent times, especially when constructed for a modern high-speed rail network, a station building may even be a true masterpiece of architecture.

A typical railway station building will have a side entrance hall off the road or square where the station is located. Near the entrance will be a ticket counter, ticket machines, or both. There will also be one or more waiting rooms, often divided by class, and equipped with seats and luggage stands. From the waiting rooms, there will usually be direct access to rail passenger services. Medium- to large-size station buildings will often also have offices for rail staff involved in the management and operation of trains. Smaller or more rural stations will have no station building at all.

== Elements ==
=== Creation of the form ===
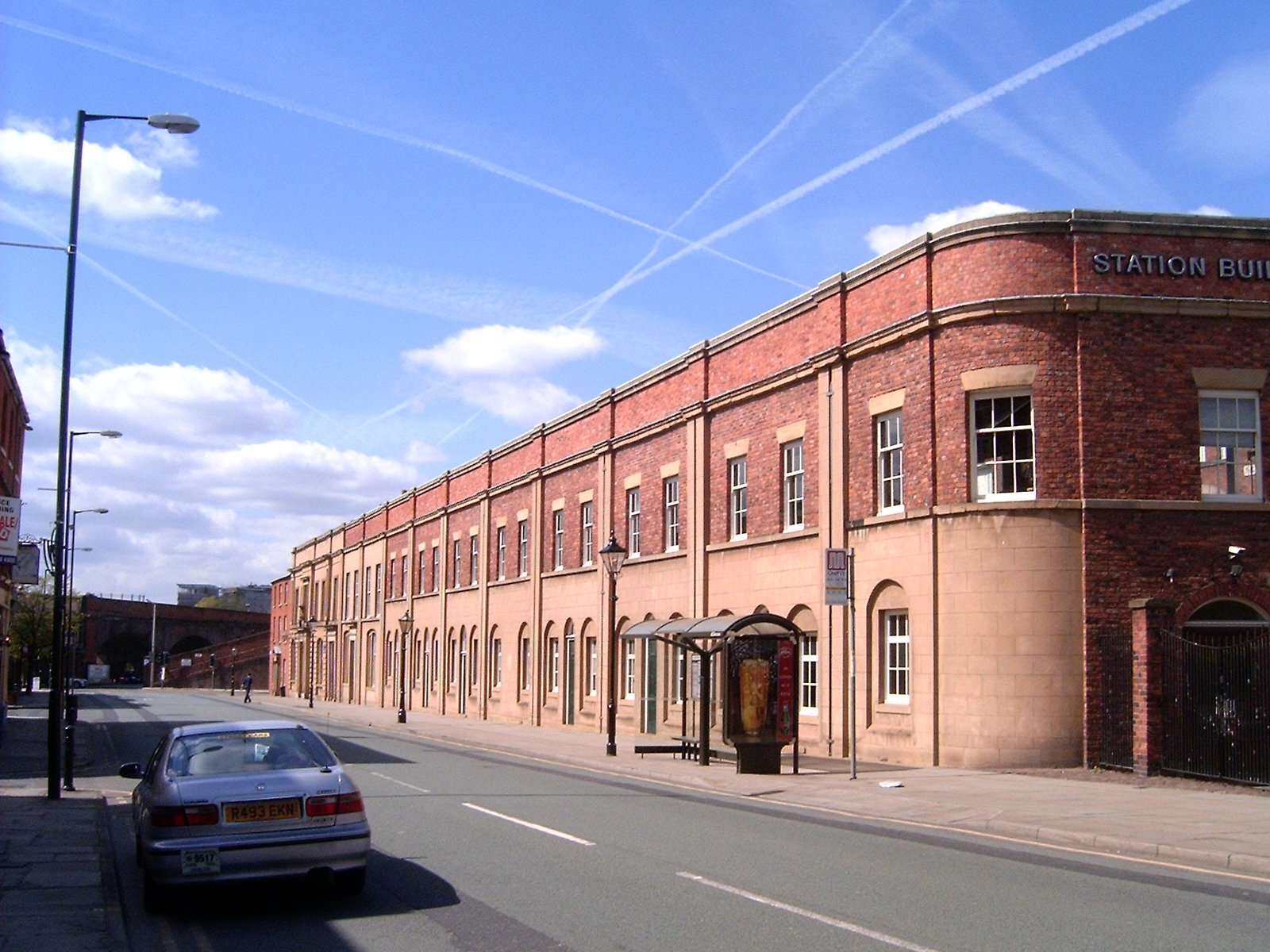
Manchester Liverpool Road railway station, opened 1830, is the oldest surviving rail terminal.

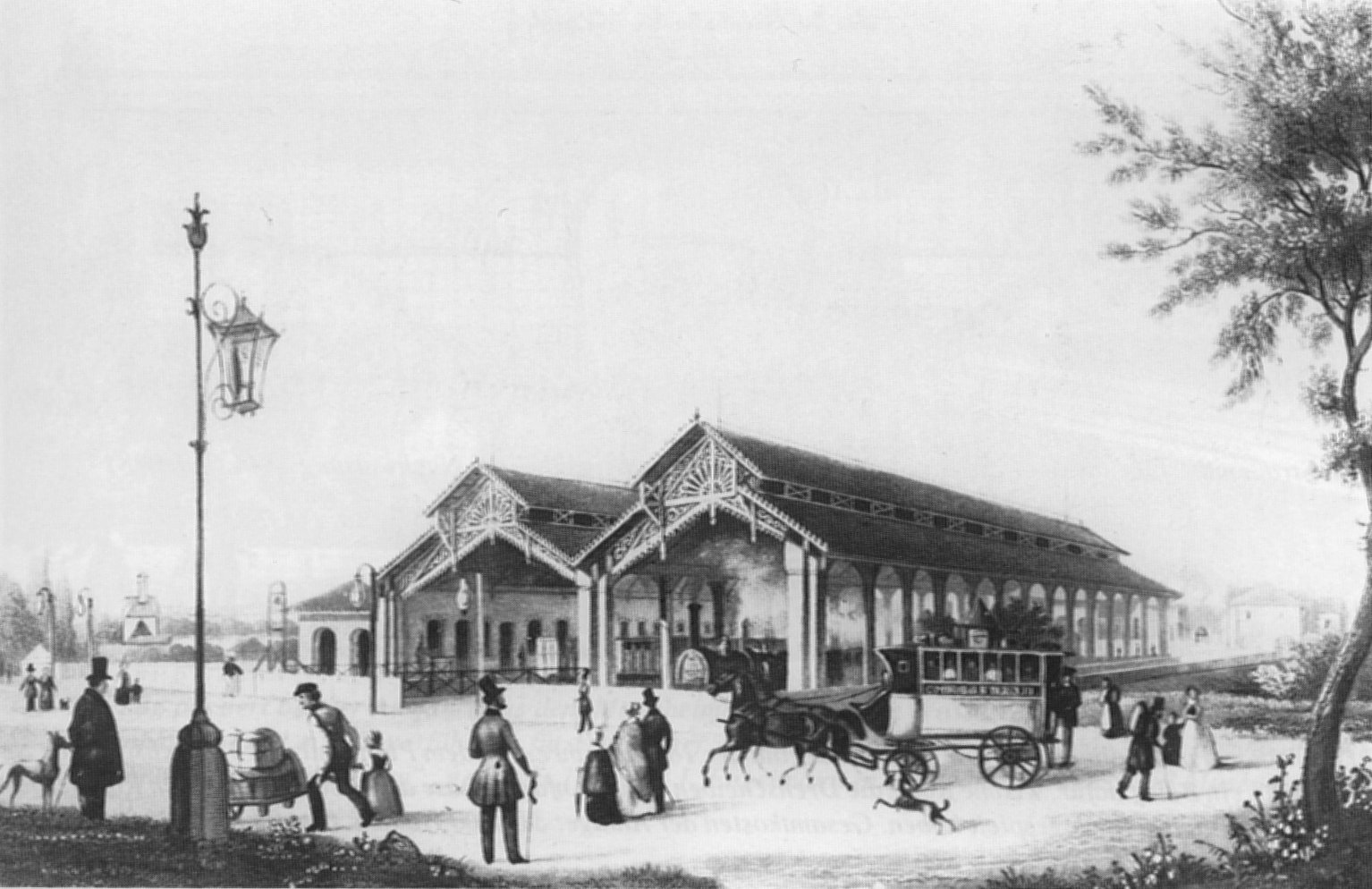
Station in Mannheim, Germany, open from 1840 to 1879

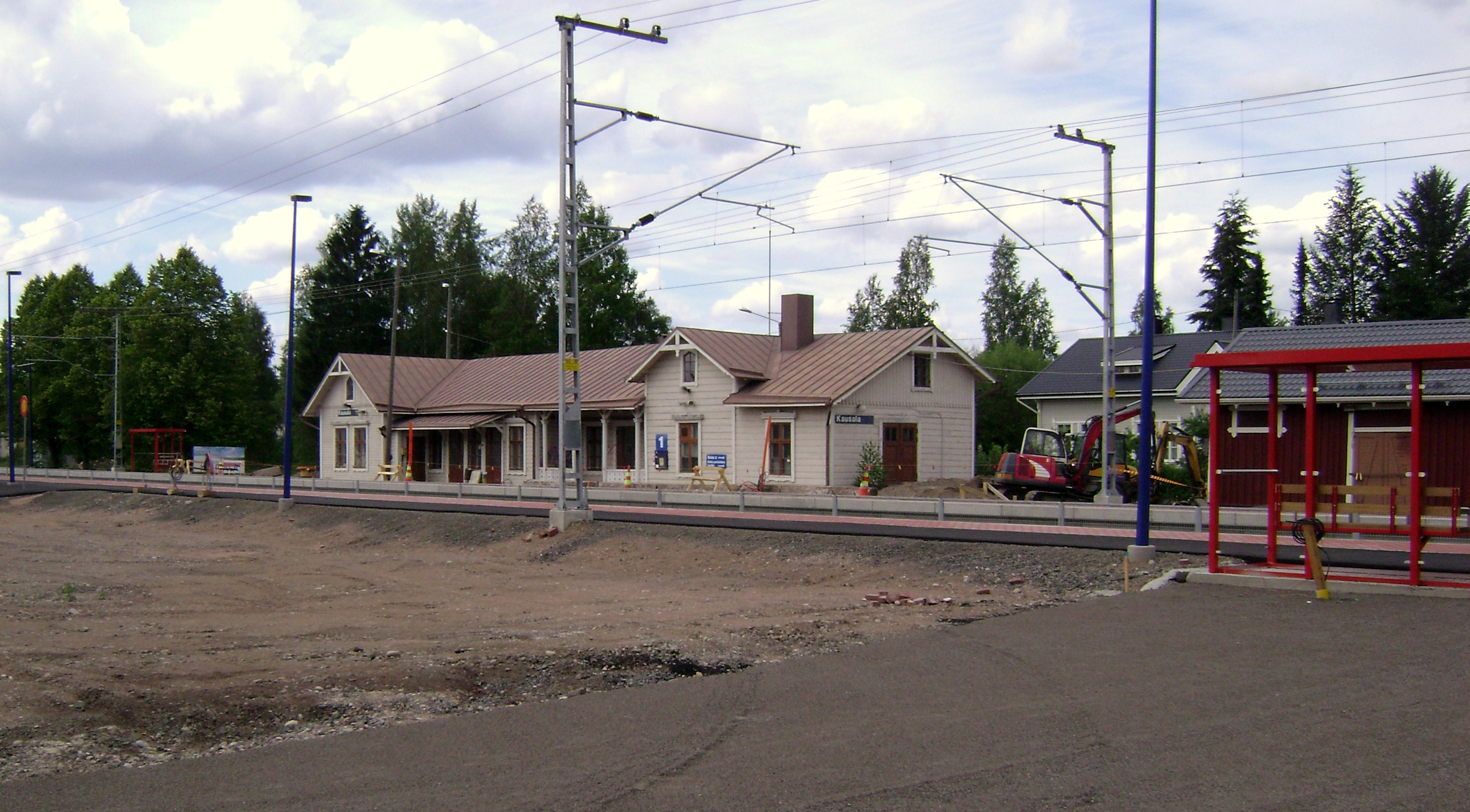
Kausala Railway Station along the Lahti–Kouvola railway in Kausala, Finland

Several decades were needed to find a formula for station building architecture that would be easily recognizable in the urban space, like that of churches and town halls. The first station buildings gave no special emphasis to their function, as they were essentially a variation on the house or office building. That makes it, for example, difficult to identify the function of the station building in the original Manchester terminus of the Liverpool and Manchester Railway or in the two railway stations in Vienna shown below, but they have been given the characteristics of a public building. Often, the earliest station buildings were so modest that the main visible element of the station was the train shed, such as for the first station in Mannheim, Germany.

Some early station building design teams tried to develop representative characteristics. Initially, this was by use of traditional architectural symbols, primarily related to the form of a "gate", such as a portico, a triumphal arch or Propylaea. But none of them (except perhaps the triumphal arch) have proved to be particularly suitable for expression of specific railway station functions. One of the early ideas was to form the station building porticos to highlight the driveway and enlarge the scale of the dominant element of the facade. This motif is already present in the Newcastle Central station building (1850), then eagerly used in other stations in the UK. It became an even more prominent motif in the twentieth century, shaping the facade of the great railway station Milano Centrale.

In British railway stations, where – thanks to constant movement of trains – the exchange of passengers takes place rapidly, the practice is not to have large station buildings. To some extent, the railway hotel buildings (or sometimes railway board offices) serve part of the station's function. These structures do not reveal, however, many features of railway stations. The one feature that can be found in many of them worldwide is a canopy over the driveway, usually made of iron (e.g. part of the former London Victoria LBSCR station).

Among the attributes of the station, it is difficult to identify an element more appropriate than the station clock. Not everyone carried a wristwatch, so it was a necessity. It can be placed not only inside the station building, but also as a distinctive feature of the building's facade.

In countries not confined to the classical architectural tradition, station building designers soon began to use the theme of the clock tower, taken over from the town hall or church. This theme sometimes served more utilitarian purposes – there were also some water towers. The clock tower became particularly popular around the start of the 20th century. Along with a covered driveway, it may be a distinguishing characteristic of railway station buildings.

Over time, growing volumes of traffic prompted the construction of railway stations of increasing scale. More and more stations also satisfied the ambitions of the city, railway boards, and countries whose railways have had to shape an appropriate image of the country.

Around the start of the 20th century, a trend towards the deliberate use of architectural forms which gave large and high spaces, often modeled on classical forms from the Roman Empire.

=== Other elements of station architecture ===
Station components in England and Germany

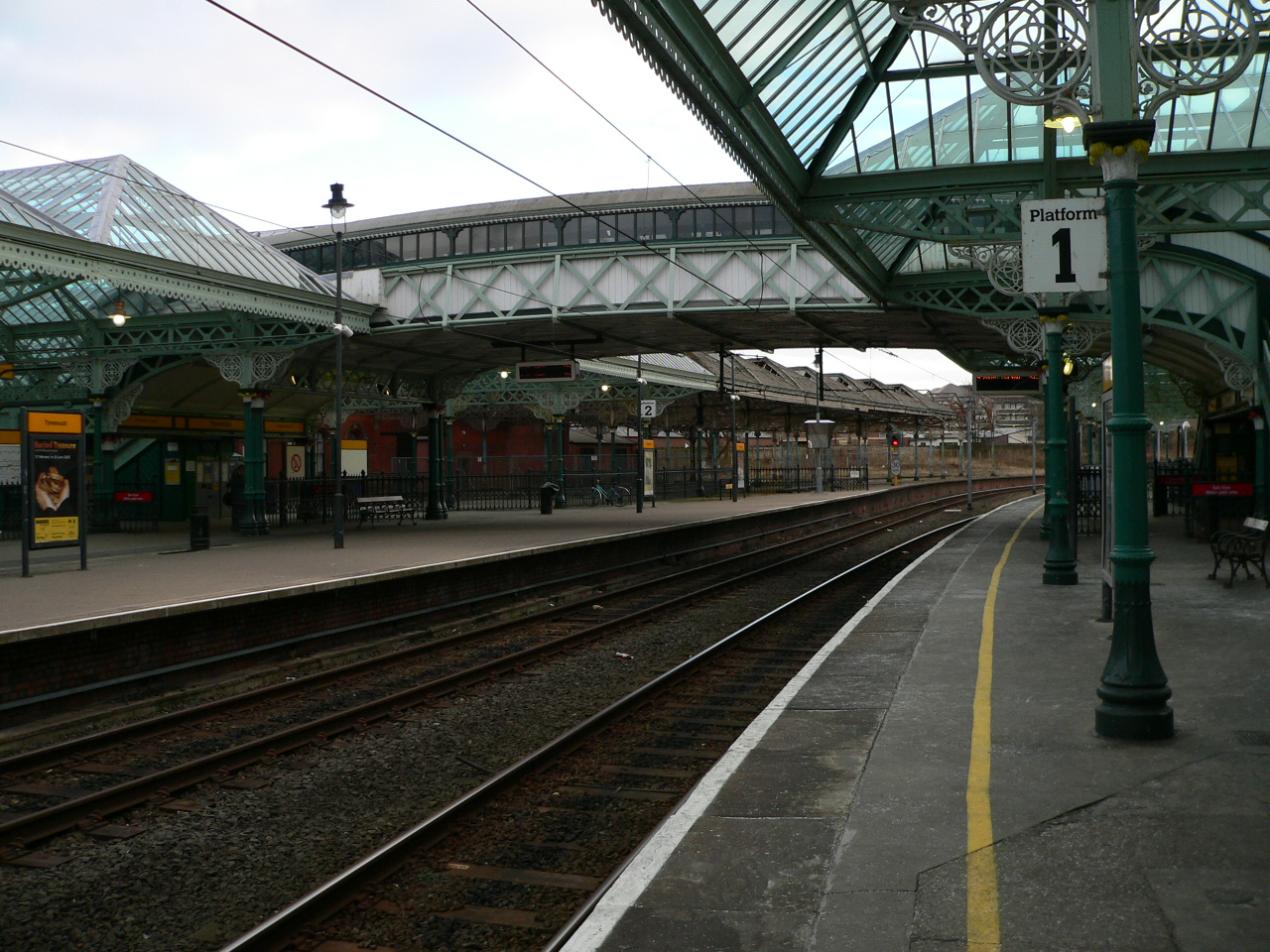
Platforms and canopies

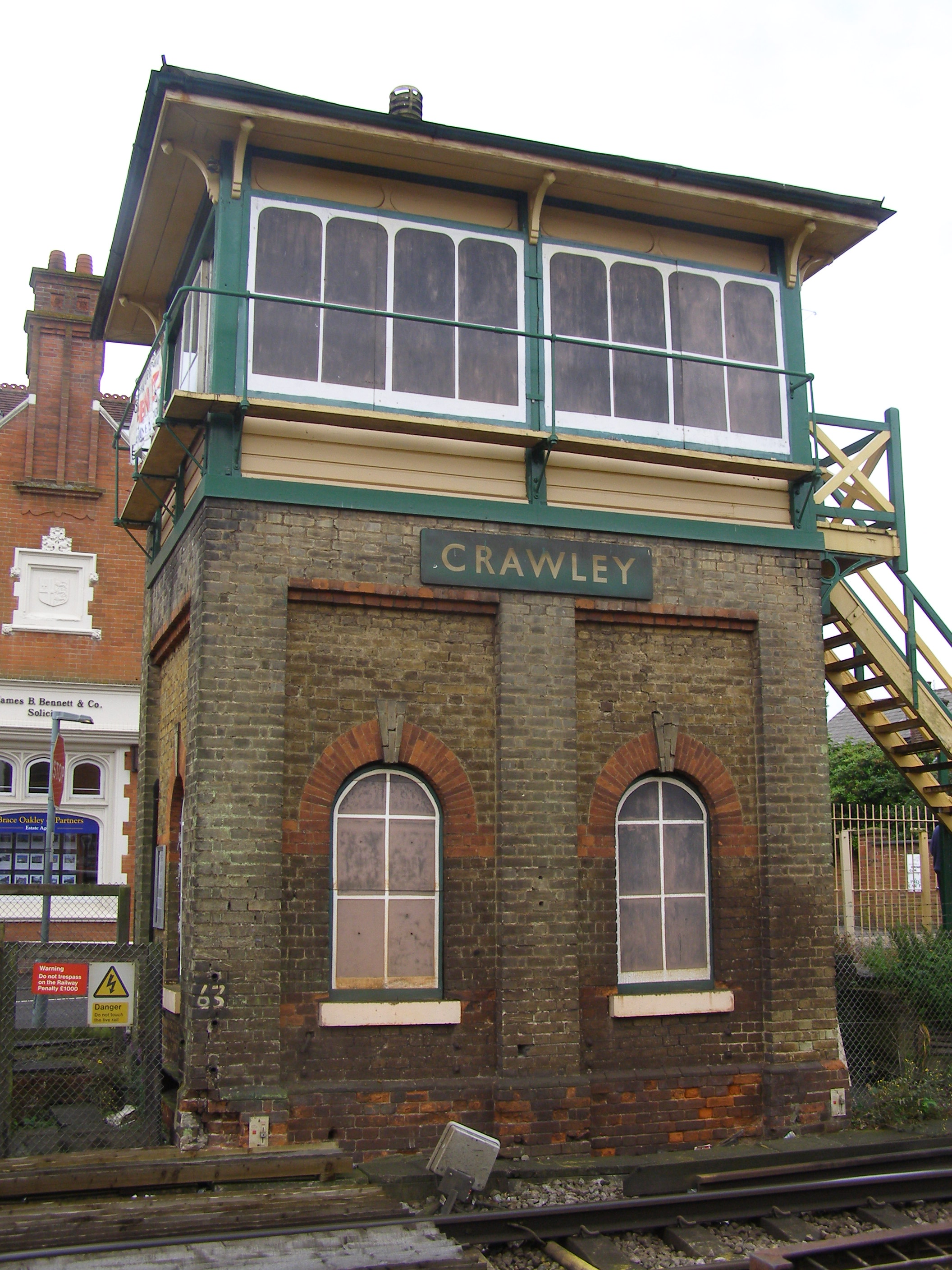
Signal box

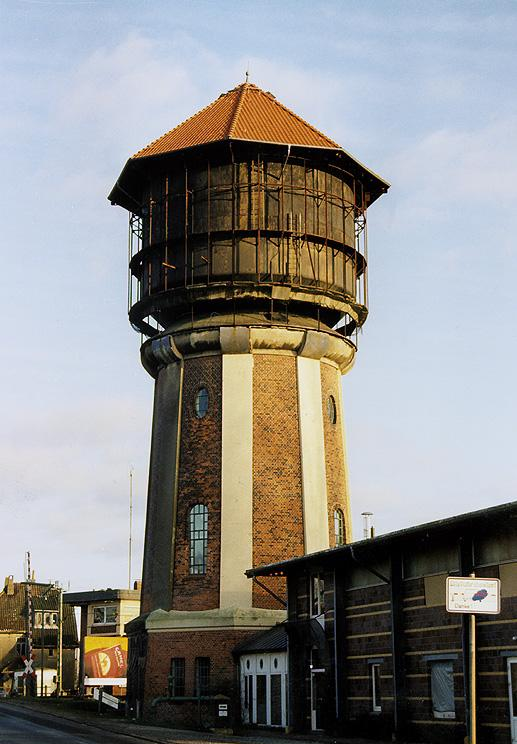
Water tower

Railway station architecture is not just the architecture of the station building. It includes the design of separate platforms and canopies, or the train shed (i.e. an overall canopy for the platforms and tracks), if any. Also, shelters can impart the characteristic face of the station and be more than a utilitarian form of construction.

Architects also create railway station towers, and buildings and equipment associated with the movement of trains: control rooms, and even signals, sometimes grouped together on the platforms over the tracks. The continued existence of these objects, especially the control room, is sometimes at risk when traffic safety technologies are updated.

== See also ==
- Airport terminal
