= Hilfiker =

Hilfiker is a surname. Notable people with the surname include:

- Andreas Hilfiker (1969), Swiss footballer
- Hans Hilfiker (1901–1993), Swiss engineer and designer
