= Swiss railway clock =

Clock design at train stations in Switzerland

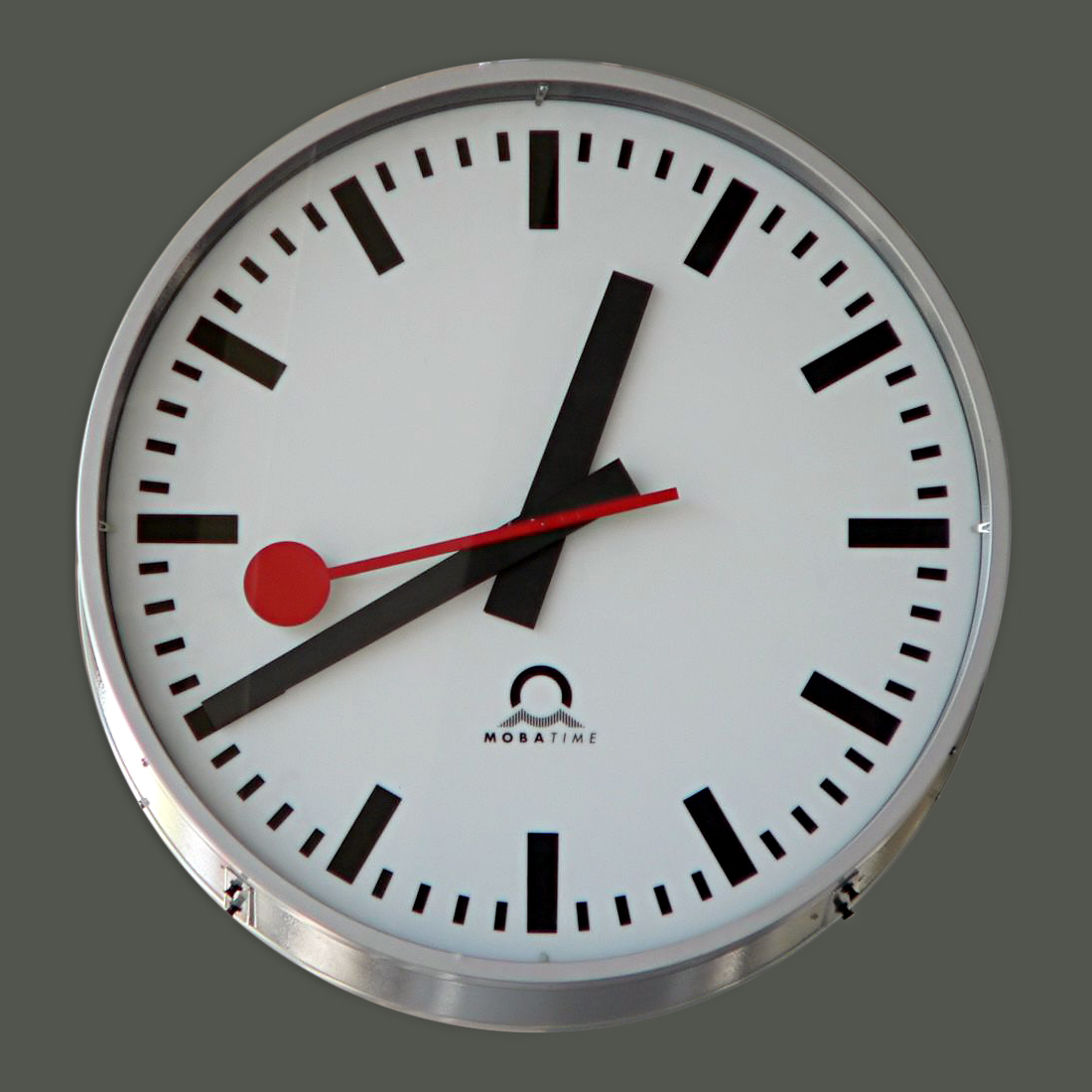
- A Swiss railway clock at Zürich HB
- Manufacturer: Moser-Baer / Mobatime
- Type: Electric clock
- Display: Analogue
- Introduced: 1944
- Movement: Synchronous motor

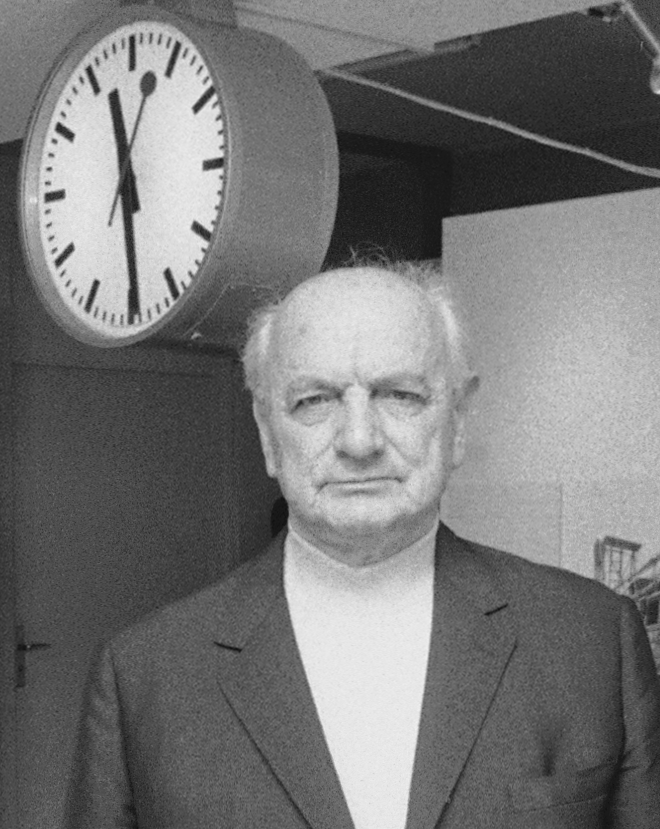
Hans Hilfiker, who developed the Swiss railway clock

The Swiss railway clock was designed in 1944 by Hans Hilfiker, a Swiss engineer and Swiss Federal Railways (SBB) employee, together with Moser-Baer, a Swiss clock manufacturer, for use by the SBB as a station clock. In 1953, Hilfiker added a red second hand in the shape of the baton used by train dispatch staff, giving the clock its current appearance.

== Technology ==
Virtual clock

The clock owes its technology to the particular requirements of operating a railway. First, railway timetables do not list seconds; trains in Switzerland always leave the station on the full minute. Secondly, all the clocks at a railway station have to run synchronously in order to show reliable time for both passengers and railway personnel anywhere on or around the station.

The station clocks in Switzerland are synchronised by receiving an electrical impulse from a central master clock at each full minute, advancing the minute hand by one minute. The second hand is driven by an electrical motor independent of the master clock. It takes only about 58.5 seconds to circle the face; then the hand pauses briefly at the top of the clock. It starts a new rotation as soon as it receives the next minute impulse from the master clock. This movement is emulated in some of the licensed timepieces made by Mondaine.

== Cultural impact ==
Since the introduction of the distinctive red second hand in 1953, the clock has become a Swiss national icon. It is included among examples of 20th-century design by both the Design Museum in London and the Museum of Modern Art in New York City.

The clock face design has been used in a line of Mondaine watches since 1986.

The clock face design is also licensed for use on certain Apple devices, such as iPads and iPhones. Apple initially used the clock design without permission in iOS 6. Although the exact details of the licensing agreement are confidential, it was reported that Apple ultimately paid Swiss national rail operator SBB about CHF 20M (about US$22.4M as of January 2014) to license the use of the clock design. Apple later removed the design from its operating system with iOS 7.

== Adoptions by other railways ==
A clock at Aarau railway station in Switzerland

In August 2020, Ñuñoa Station in the Santiago Metro had a Swiss railway clock installed on it.

The British Section of the Kowloon–Canton Railway (renamed the KCR East Rail in the late 1990s) in Kowloon and the New Territories, Hong Kong has used the Swiss railway clock since the 1980s on platforms and concourses with its logo on the clock. The same clock was also installed in stations along the KCR West Rail and the KCR Ma On Shan Rail opened in 2003 and 2004 respectively. With their operation leased as a service concession by its owner and then operator Kowloon–Canton Railway Corporation to the MTR Corporation Limited in 2008, the logo was covered by the new operator. As of September 2022, the new operator has been found retiring station clocks and discarding them as scrap metal.
