= Road foreman of engines =

Road foreman of engines, in the United States, is the traditional title of the person in charge of and the supervisor of, a locomotive engineer. An engineer who wishes to enter the management ranks on a railroad becomes a road foreman of engines. Their job is the overall supervision and to instruct, discipline, train and evaluate, the performance and skill of a railroad engineer. They are essentially an engineer's boss.

== Background ==
In the United States, engineers are licensed by the Federal Railroad Administration for their craft. Railroads had to designate who can supervise an engineer. Only a person who is an FRA-certified locomotive engineer can instruct and supervise an engineer in his craft. Therefore, the road foremen were designated as "designated supervisor of locomotive engineers" (DSLE).

Road foremen also have the responsibility of analyzing data from locomotive event recorders. This is done in post-accident investigation and for random review of a locomotive engineer's performance.

== See also ==
- Railroad track foreman
- List of railway industry occupations
