= Luminox =

Swiss-made watch brand

- Company type: Private
- Industry: Watch manufacturing
- Founded: 1989; 37 years ago
- Founder: Barry Cohen
- Headquarters: San Rafael, California, United States
- Products: Watches
- Parent: Mondaine
- Website: www.luminox.com

Luminox is a Swiss-made watch brand owned by Mondaine and based in San Rafael, California, United States. Luminox watches contain tritium inserts, providing long-term luminescence.

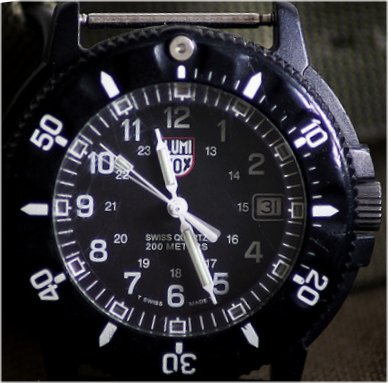
Luminox SEAL watch

== Luminox history ==
Luminox Watch Company is a U.S. company founded in 1989 and headquartered in Pfaffikon, Switzerland. Luminox also makes branded watches for various military groups with custom insignias and designs. Among these are the Heliswiss team, US Coast Guard, US Air Force, and a variety of other special forces and EMS teams worldwide.

The brand has since expanded into over 30 countries. Among the more popular watch models are those designed using visual elements of the fighter jets made by Lockheed Martin. To date, Luminox has designed watches taking cues from the SR-71 Blackbird, the F-117 Nighthawk, the F-16 Fighting Falcon, and the F-22 Raptor.

In 2006, a fifty-percent stake in the Luminox company was purchased by the Swiss brand Mondaine, giving Mondaine increased access to the American market, and Luminox increased access to the European and Asian markets. In 2016, Mondaine Watch Ltd. took over the remaining half of Luminox to become sole owner.

== Notable technology ==
Luminox watches are advertised to possess "always visible technology." The watch hands and markers contain tritium inserts which provide long-term luminescence, as opposed to phosphorescent markers used in other watches, which must be charged by a light source.

The tritium in a gaseous tritium light source undergoes beta decay, releasing electrons which cause the phosphor layer to fluoresce. During manufacture, a length of borosilicate glass tube which has had the inside surface coated with a phosphor-containing compound is filled with the radioactive tritium. The tube is then fused with a CO_{2} laser at the desired length. Borosilicate glass is used for its strength and resistance to breakage. In the tube, the tritium gives off a steady stream of electrons due to beta decay. These particles excite the phosphor, causing it to emit a low, steady glow.

== Products ==
Luminox offers four lines of water resistant watches, labeled "Sea", "Air", "Land" and "Space". There are reported cases of counterfeit watches in circulation for the Luminox brand. The fake Luminox watches are reported to be shinier than originals and have wrong font numbers on the dial.
