= Station clock =

Clock for railway passengers and staff

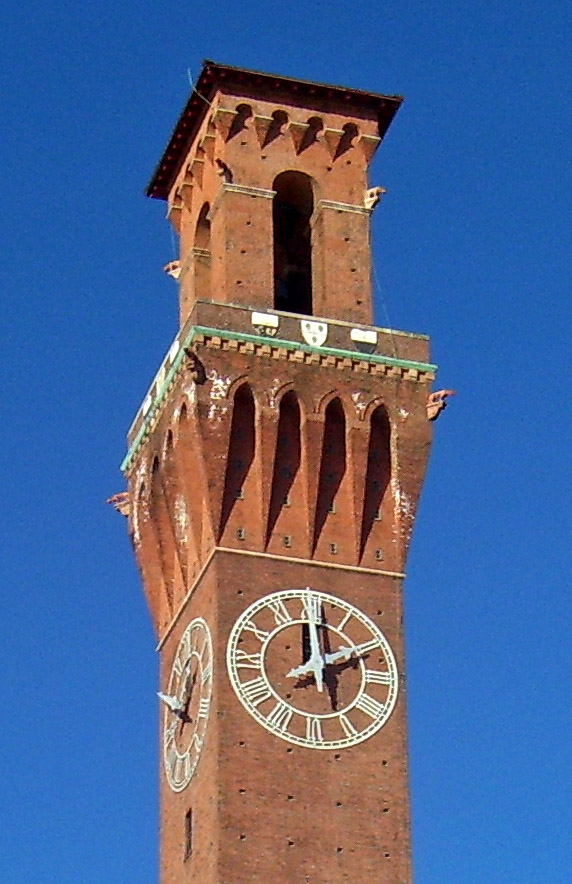
Clock tower with station clock, Waterbury Union Station, Waterbury, Connecticut, USA.

A station clock is a clock at a railway station that provides a standard indication of time to both passengers and railway staff.

A railway station will often have several station clocks. They can be found in a clock tower, in the booking hall or office, on the concourse, inside a train shed, on or facing the station platforms, or elsewhere.

== Design ==
The design of station clocks in Europe was formerly quite diverse. Today, the majority of them are derived from the Swiss railway clock designed by Hans Hilfiker, a Swiss engineer, in 1944 when he was an employee of the Swiss Federal Railways. In 1953, Hilfiker added a red second hand to its design in the shape of a railway guard's signaling disc. The technical implementation of the railway clock, the central synchronization by a master clock, was engineered together with Mobatime, a clock manufacturer still producing the Swiss railway clock as well as the German railway clock besides many others.

Modern European station standard station clock designs have a white clock face that is illuminated in the dark, bar shaped black coloured marks or scales, but no numbers, at the periphery of the clock face dial, and bar-shaped hour and minute hands, also coloured black. The second hand on these standard designs is a thin bar, thickened or fitted with a disc at the peripheral end, and often coloured red. Such clock designs are easily legible from a distance.

== Examples ==
Older European station clocks

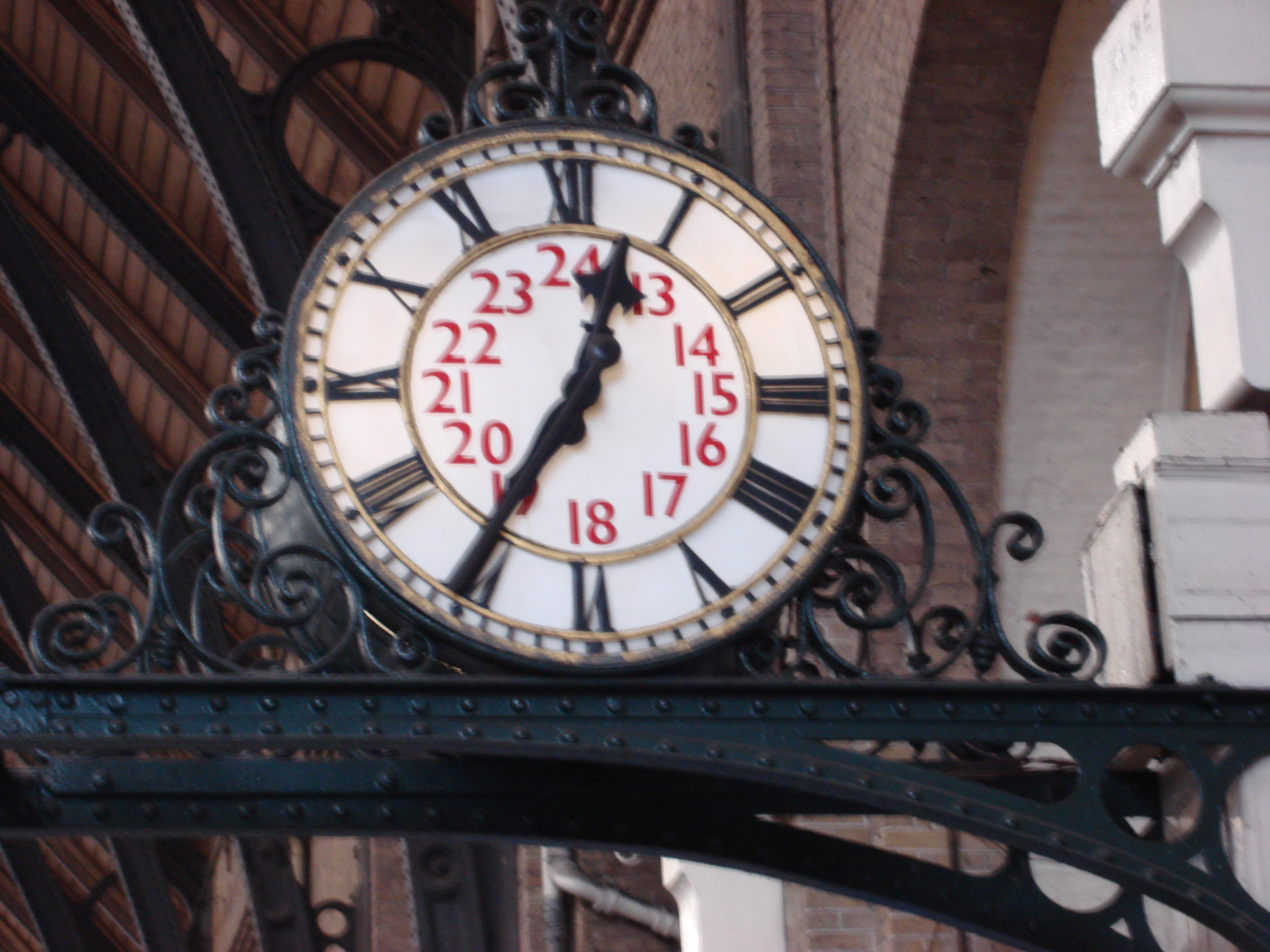
King's Cross, London

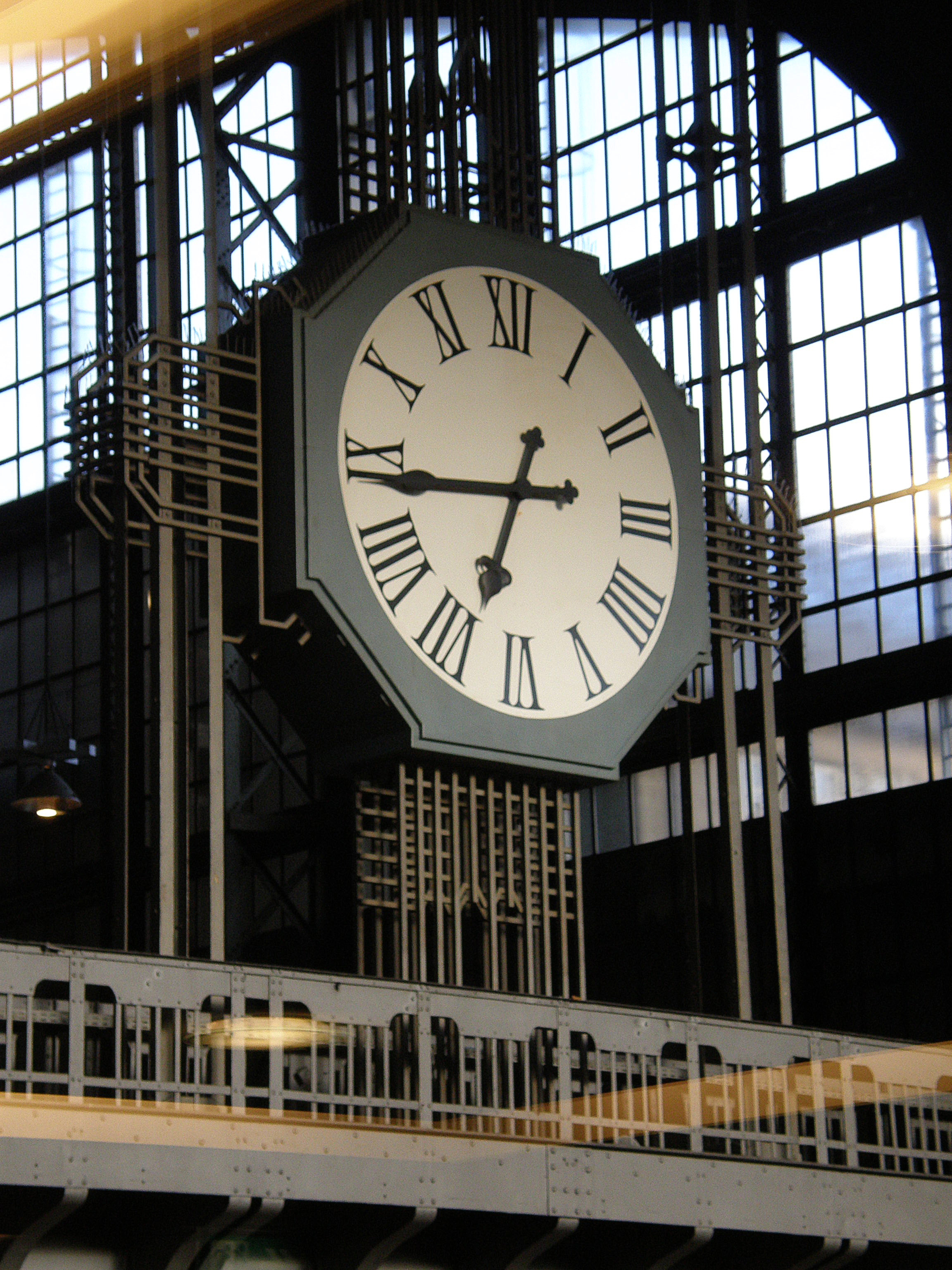
Hamburg Hauptbahnhof

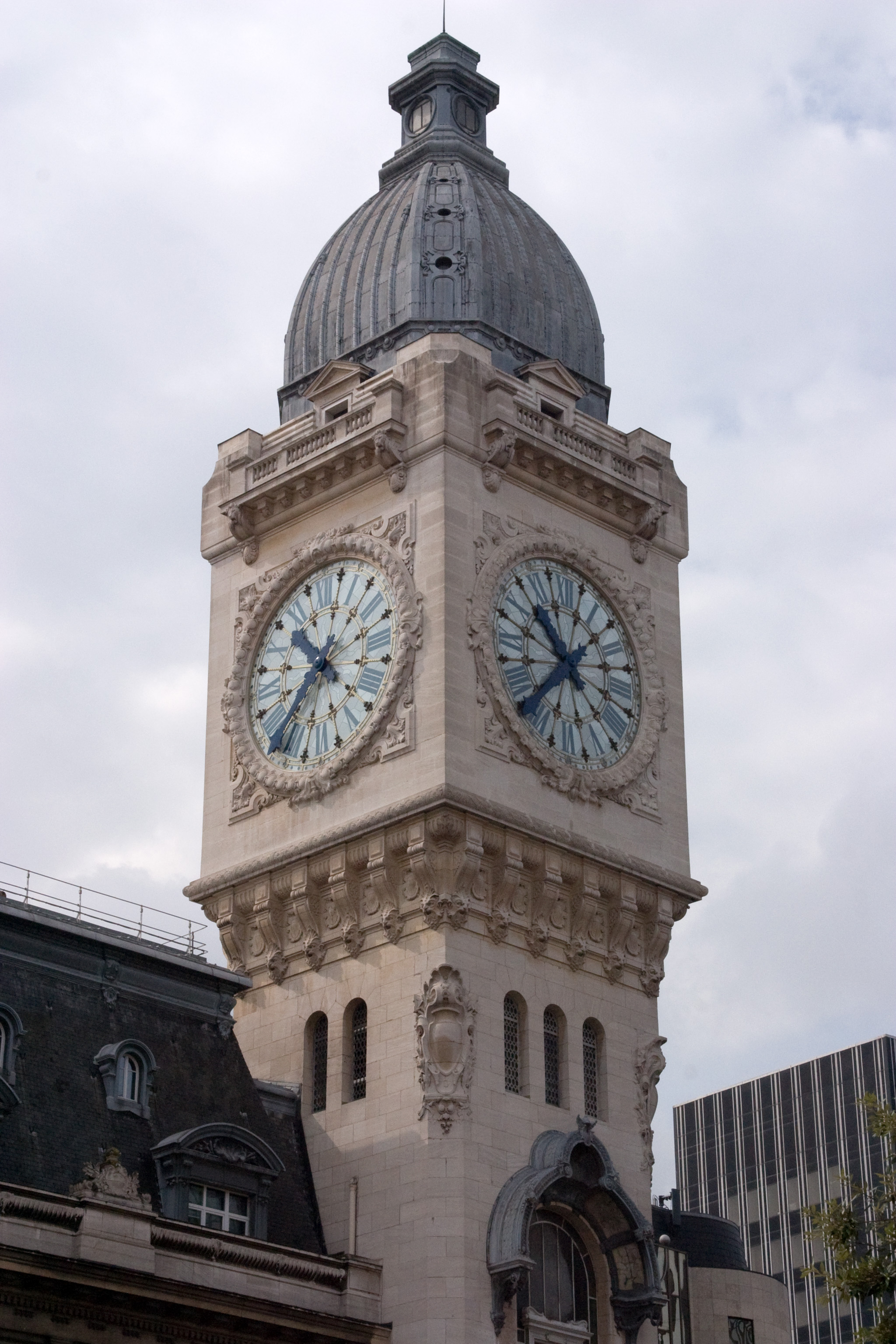
Gare de Lyon, Paris

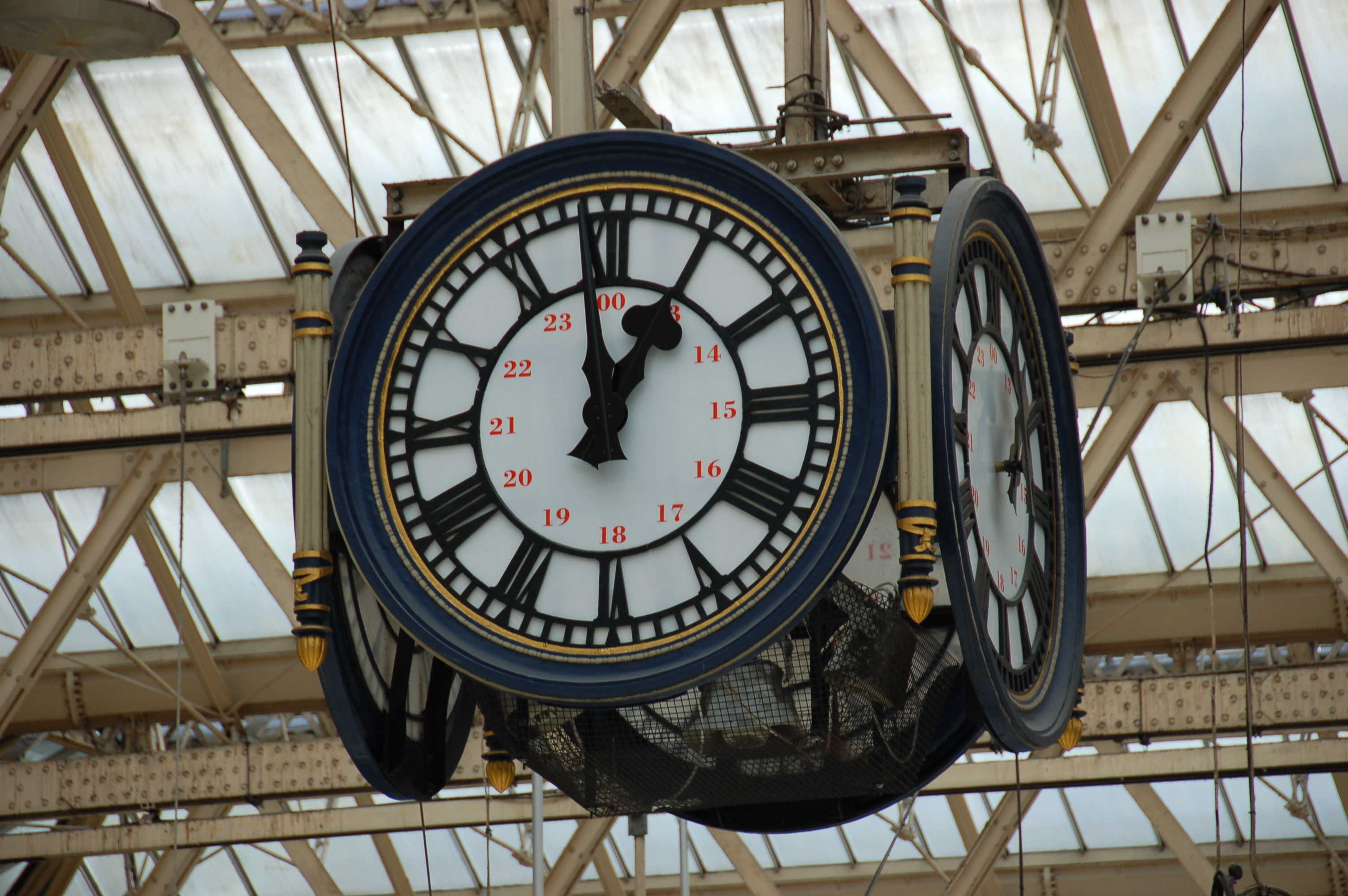
Waterloo, London
Modern European station clocks

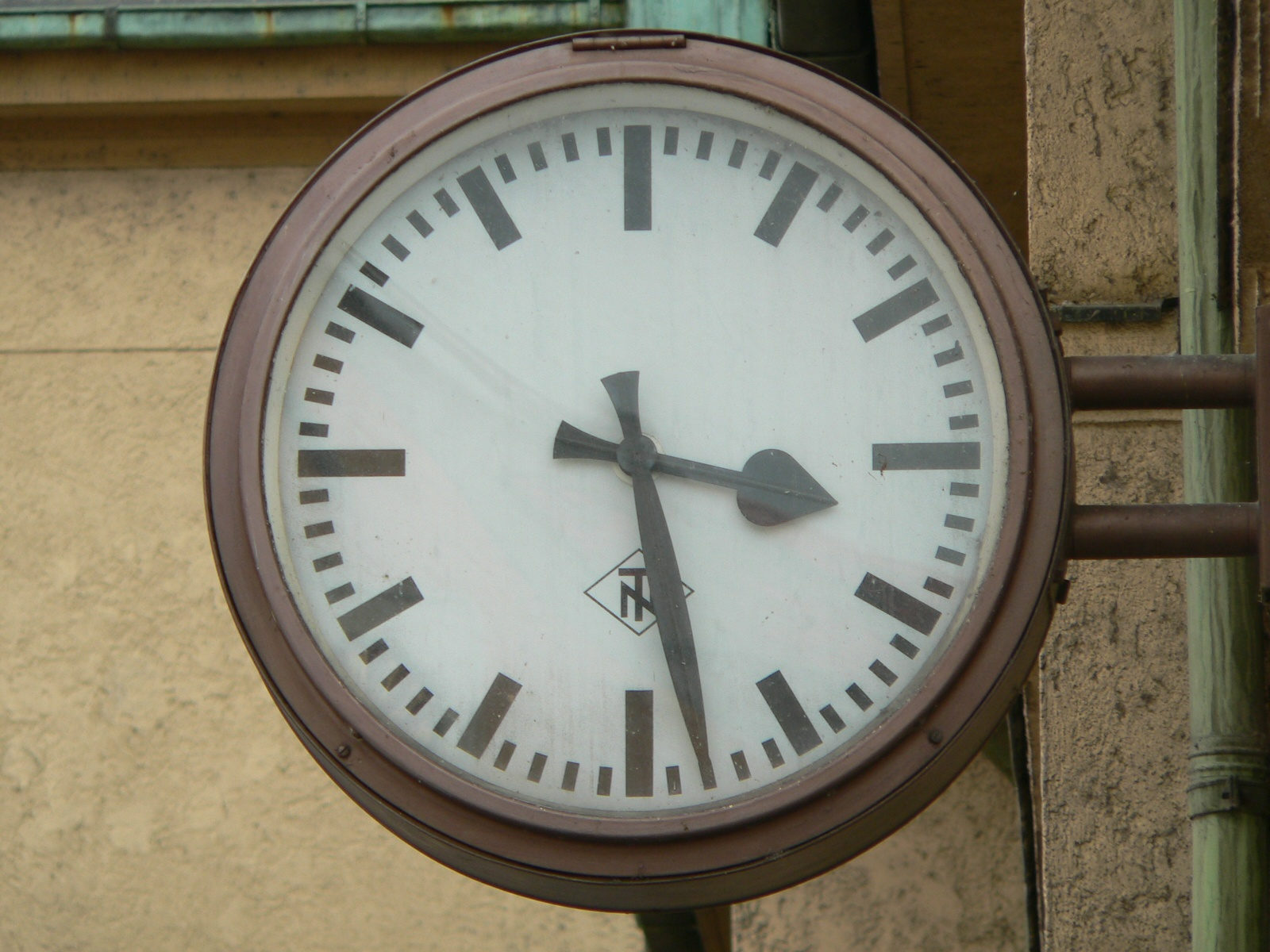
Round face, with curved pointers.

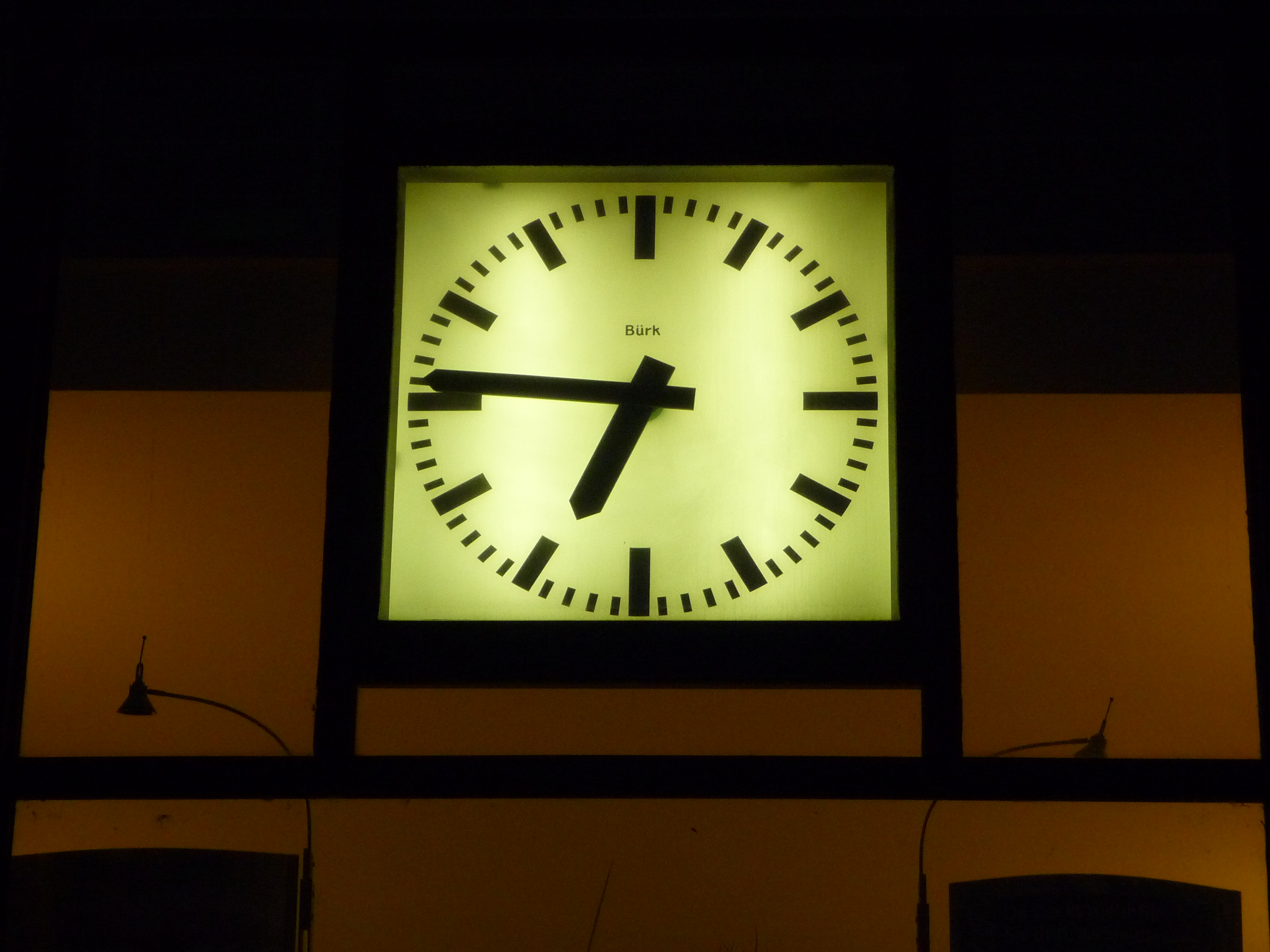
Square face, with straight edged pointers.

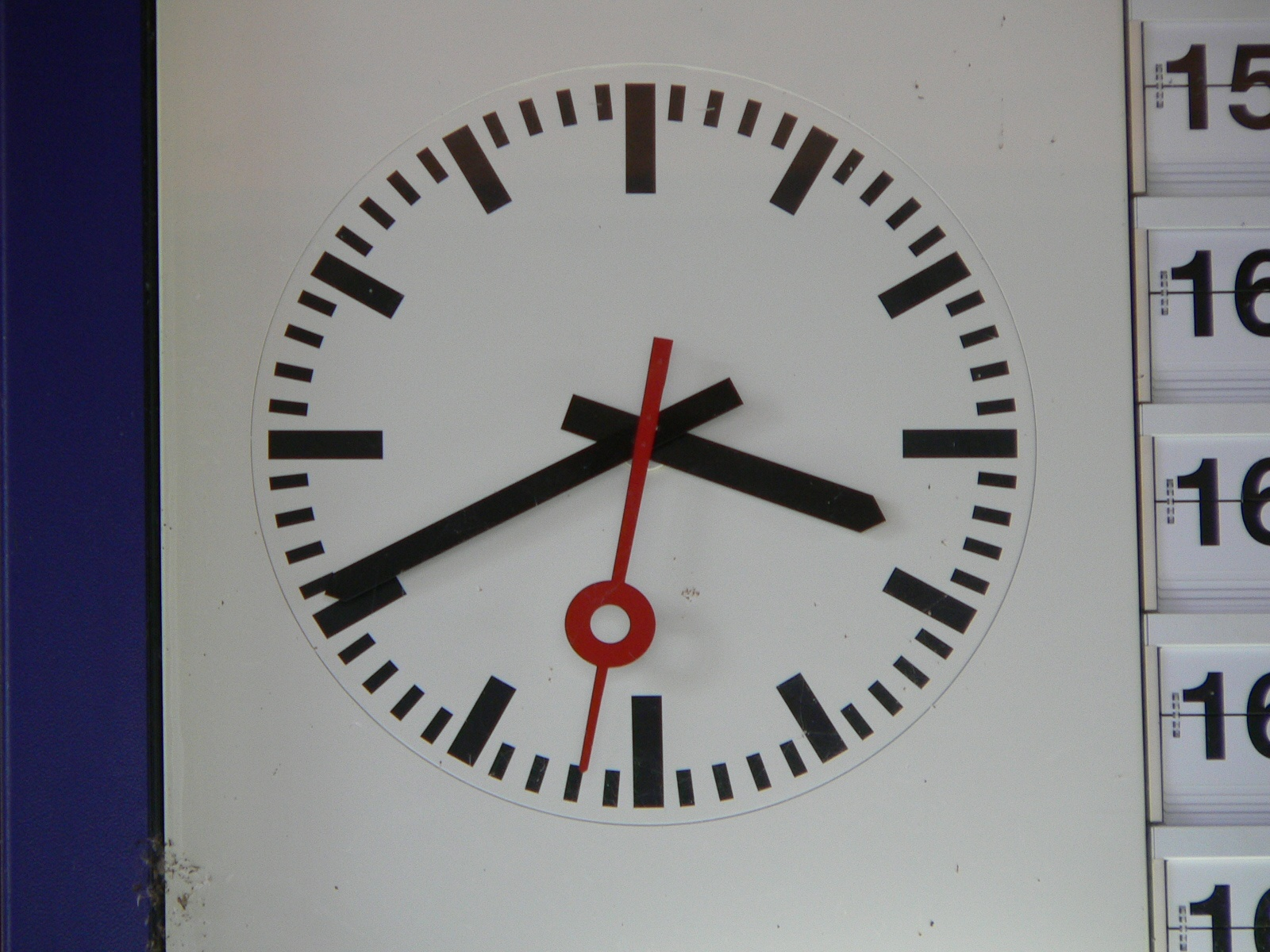
Modern German station clock next to split-flap display board.

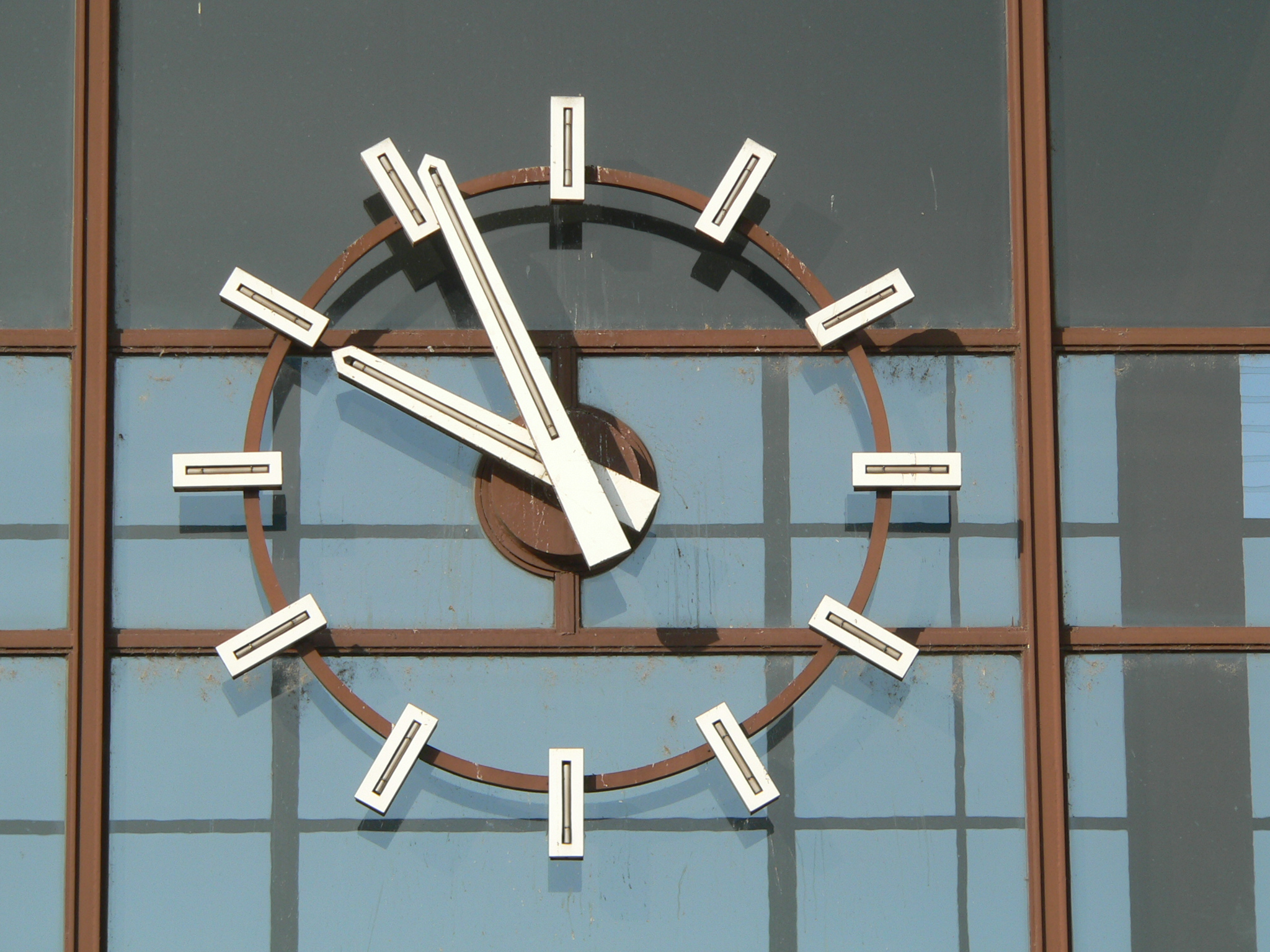
Customised design (Heidelberg Hbf)

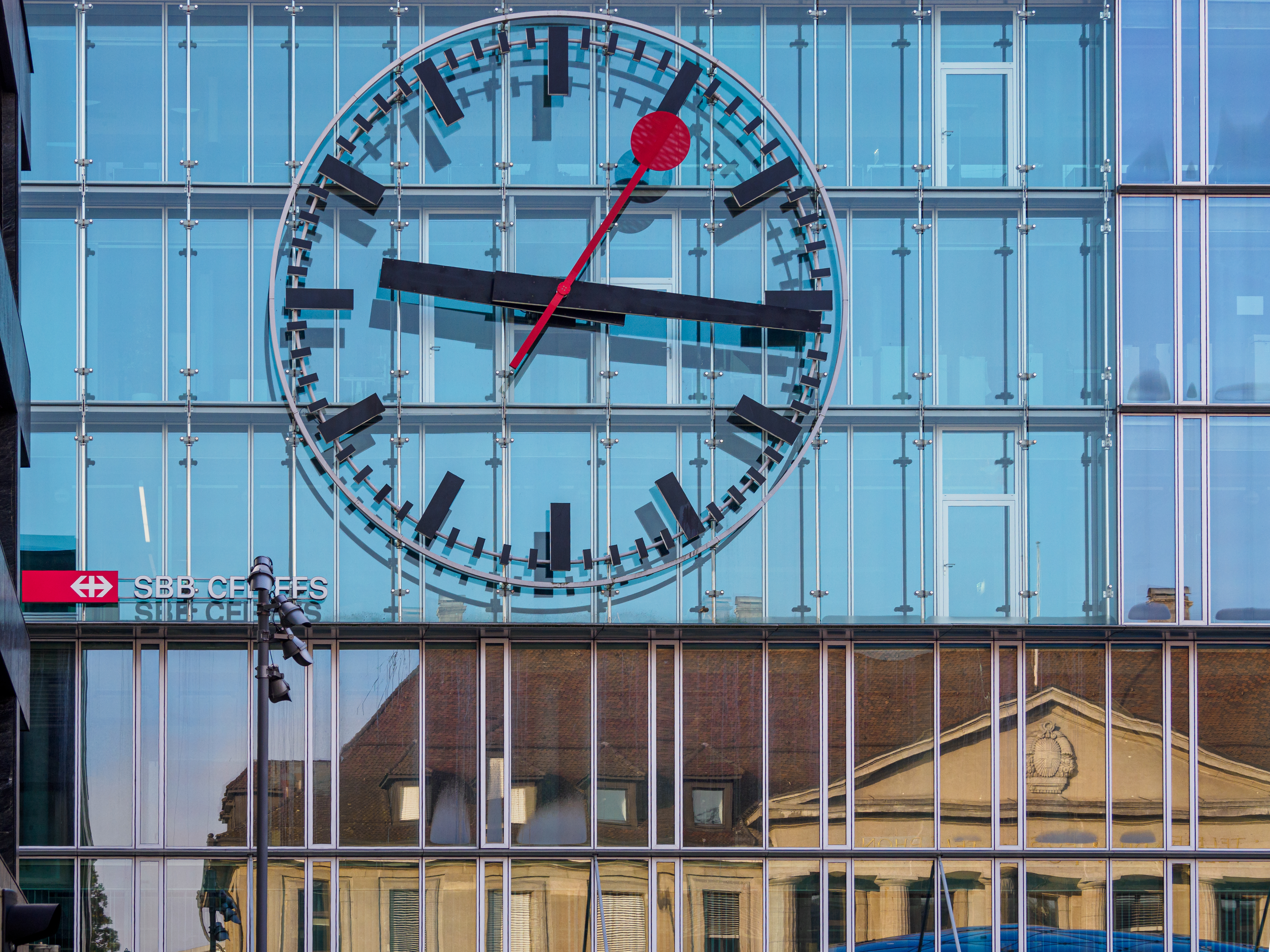
Aarau station clock with a 9 m diameter
Modern European standard station clock designs

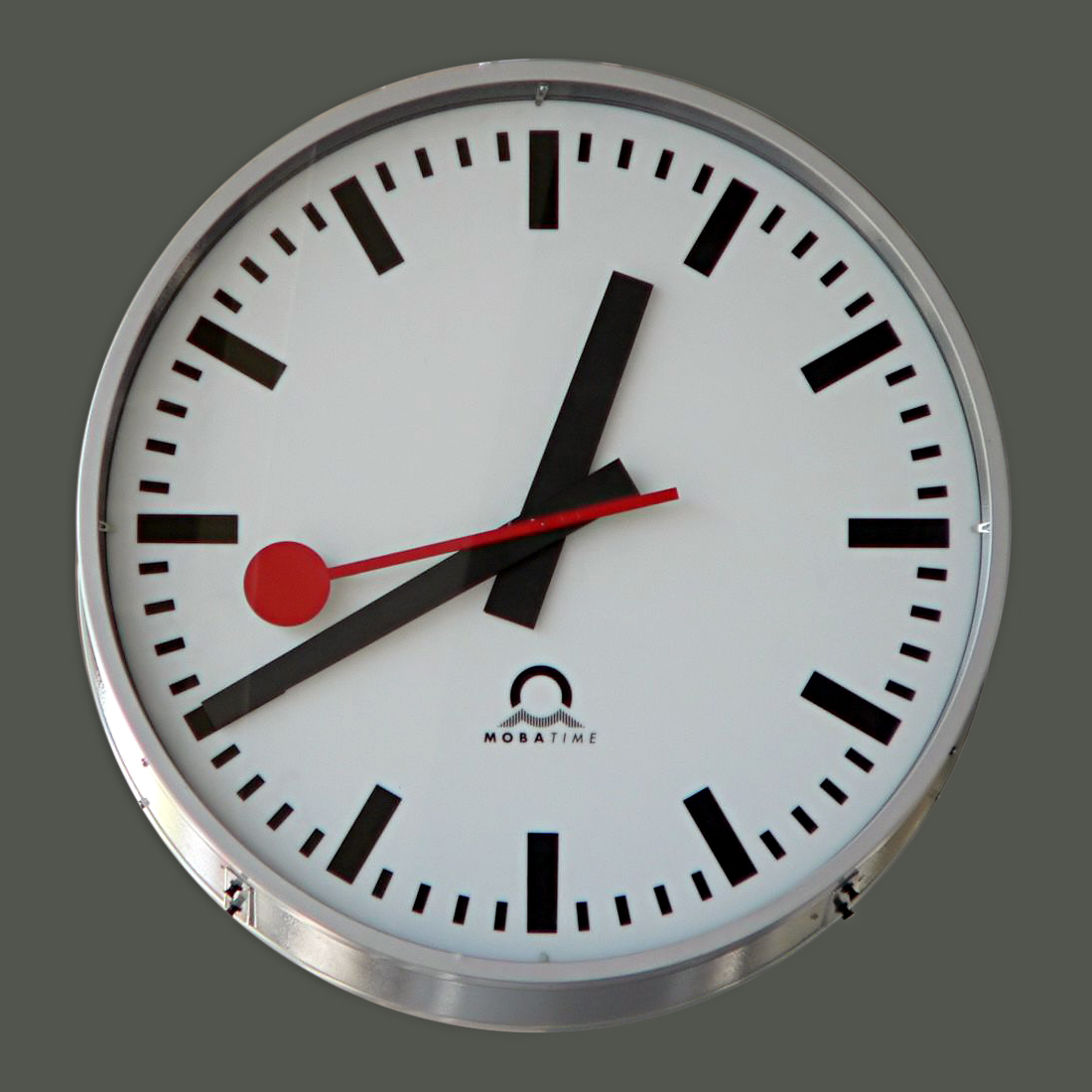
Swiss railway clock, the "mother" of the modern railway clocks

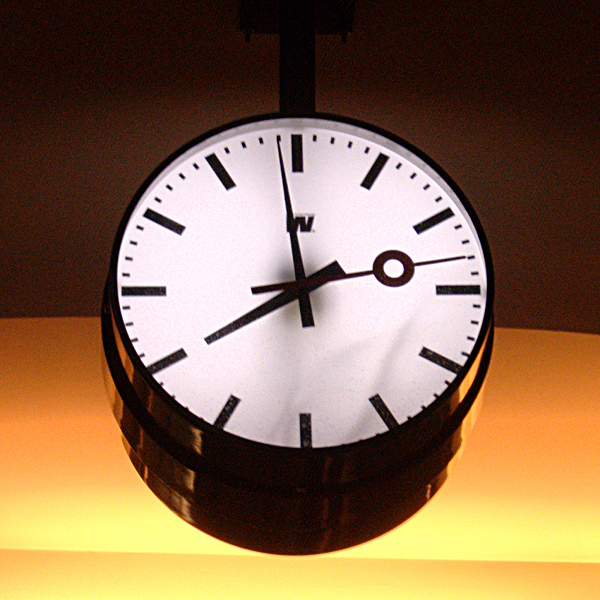
Belgium

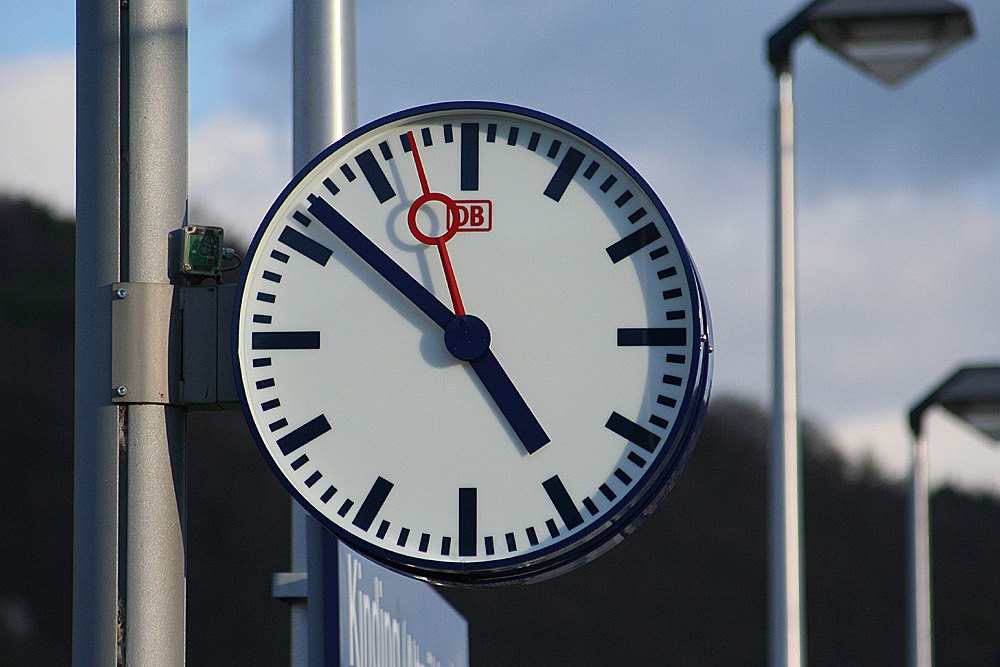
Classic German DB station clock

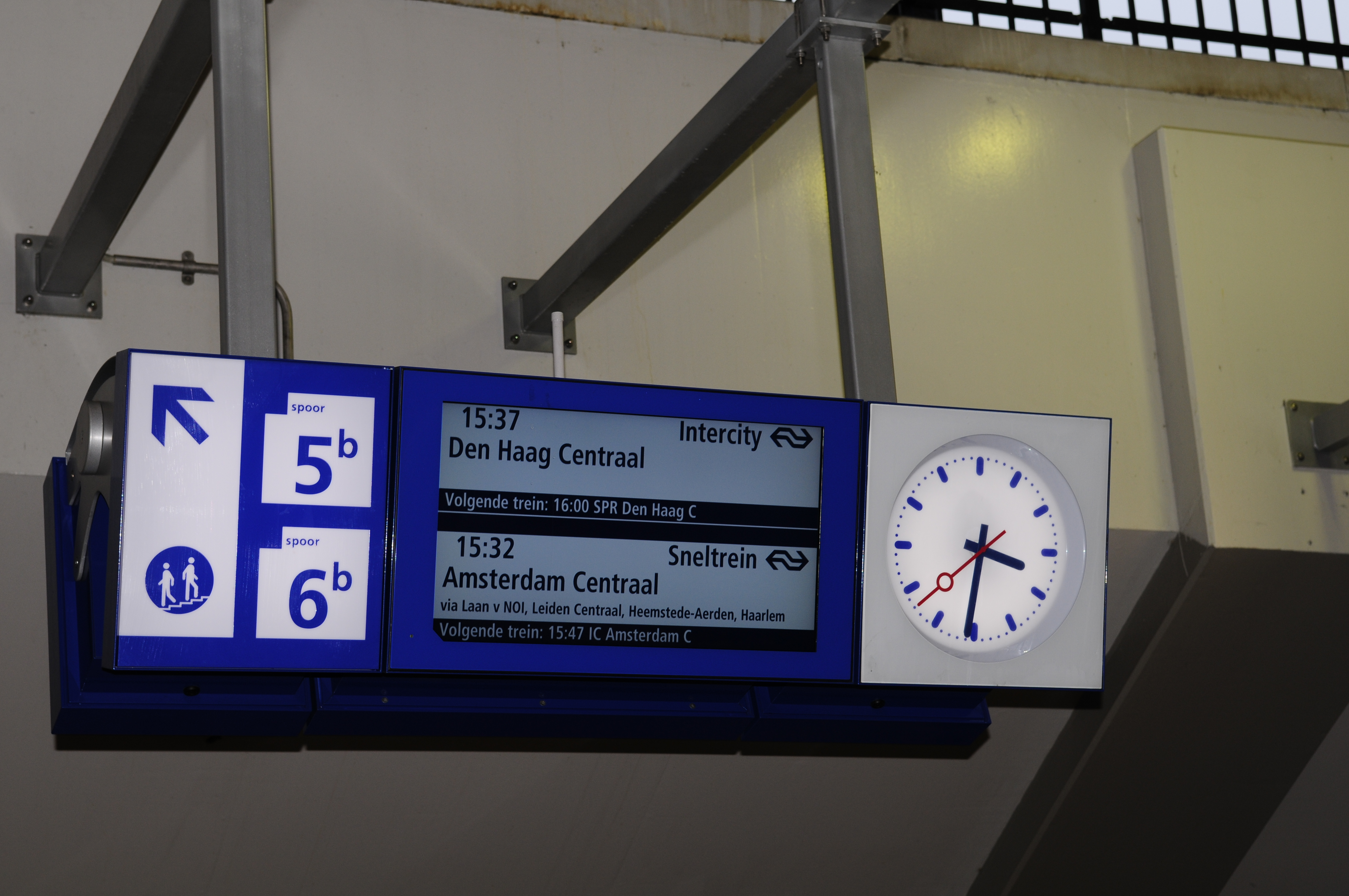
Dutch NS station clock

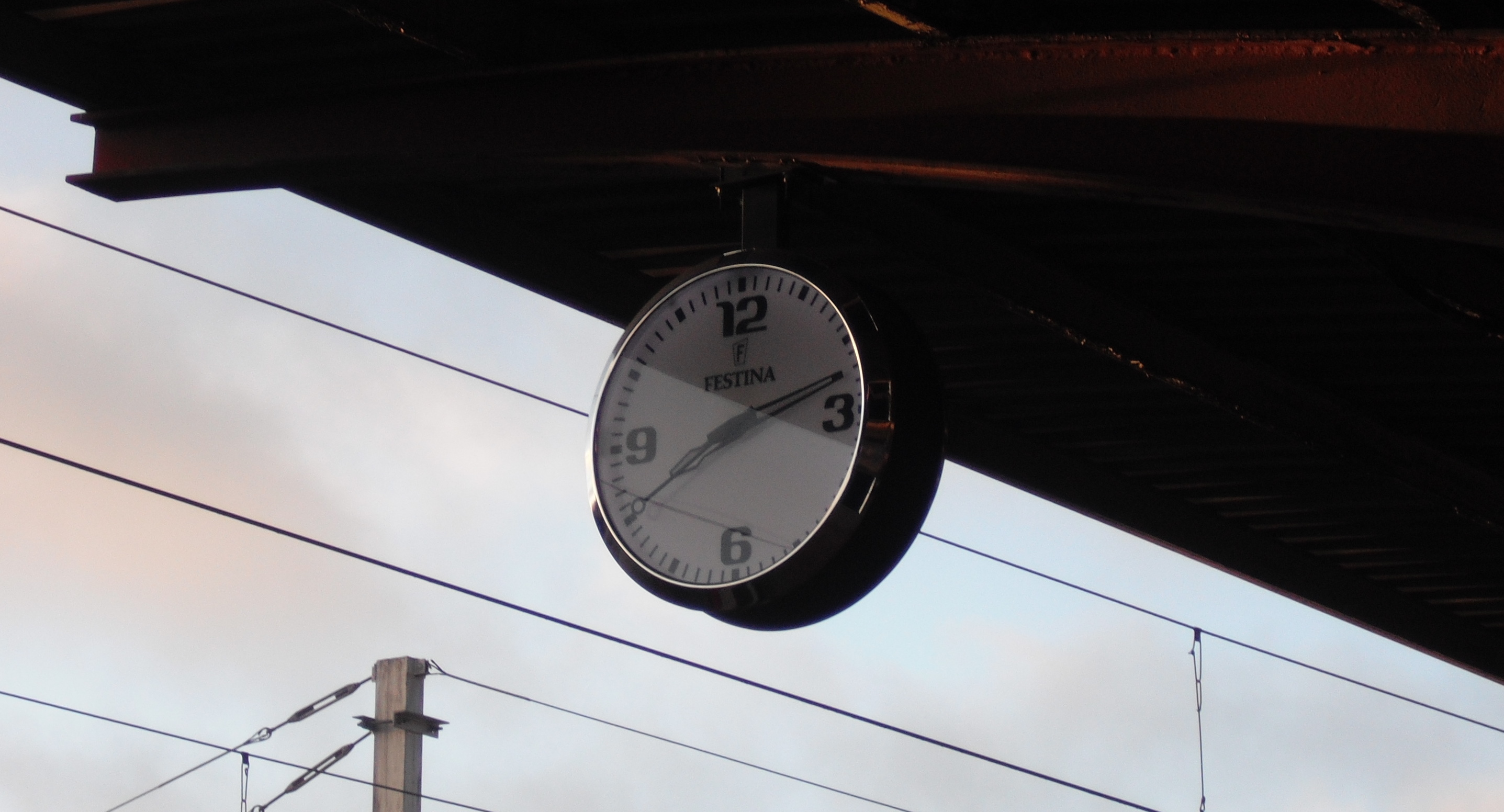
Spanish Renfe station clock

== See also ==
- Electric clock
- Railway time
- Standard time
