= List of railway industry occupations =

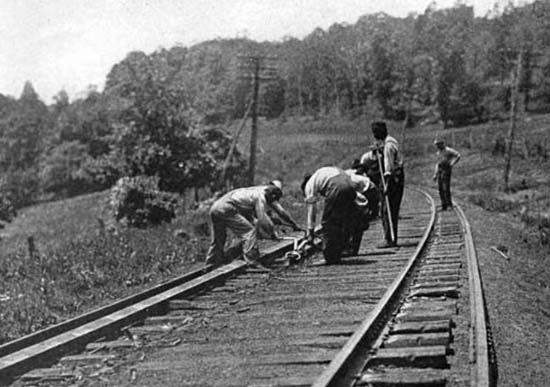
A railroad section gang — including common workers sometimes called gandy dancers — responsible for maintenance of a particular section of railway. One man is holding a bar, while others are using rail tongs to position a rail. Photo published in 1917

This is a list of railway industry occupations, but it also includes transient functional job titles according to activity.

== By sector ==
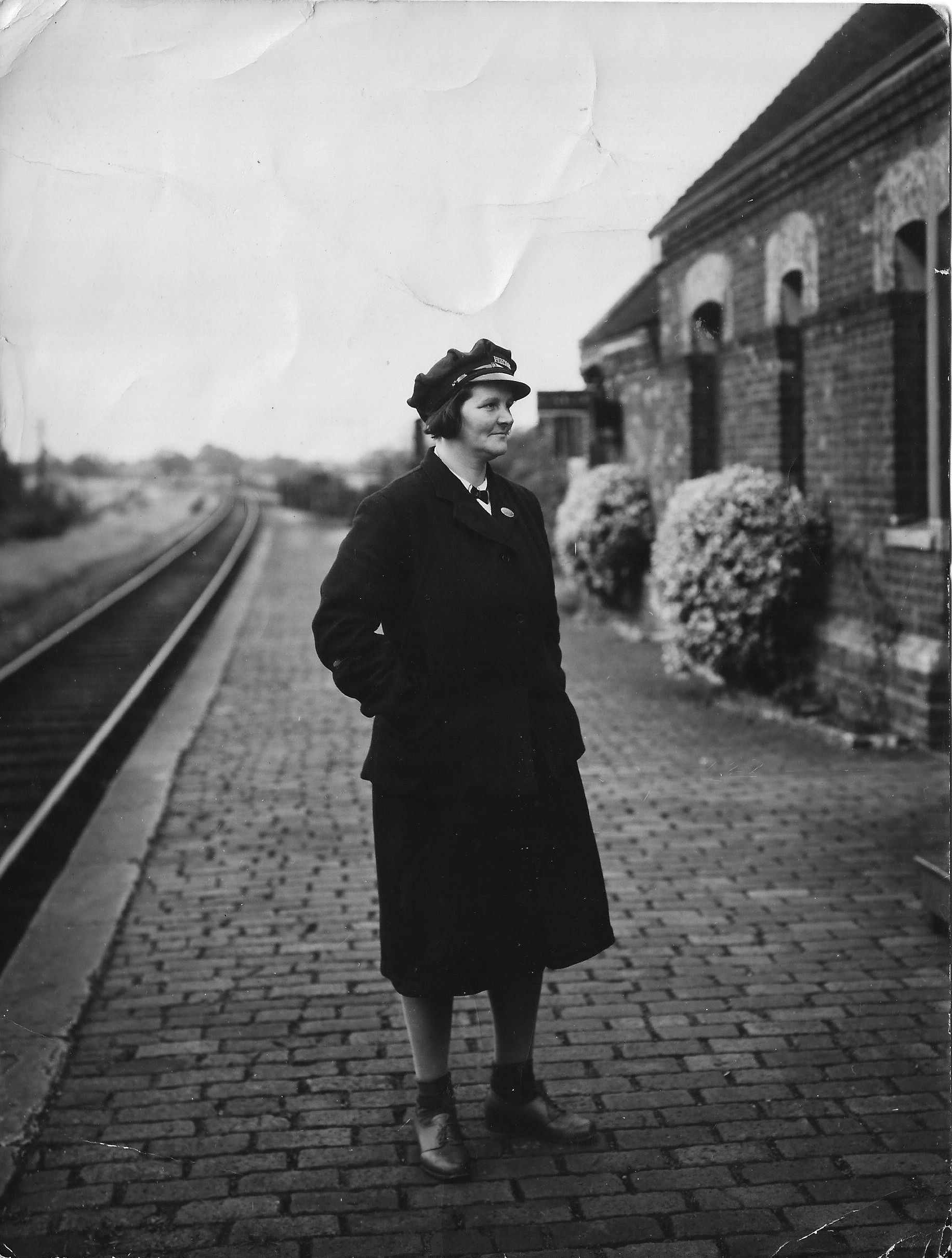
Station mistress at Padbury railway station

=== Engineering ===
- Chief Mechanical Engineer
- Locomotive Superintendent (Chief Mechanical Engineer)
- Manager (Guard)

=== Station ===
- Station agent
- Senior Station Superintendent
- Station Superintendent
- Deputy Station Superintendent
- Selected Station Master
- Senior Station Master
- Junior Station master
- Deputy Station Master
- Assistant Station Master
- Pointsman
- Porter

=== Revenue ===
- Ticket controller
- Revenue Protection Inspector
- Ticket inspector

=== Operations ===
- Train dispatcher
- Dispatcher
- Freight Conductor
- Signalman

=== Management ===
- Road foreman of engines

=== Maintenance of way ===
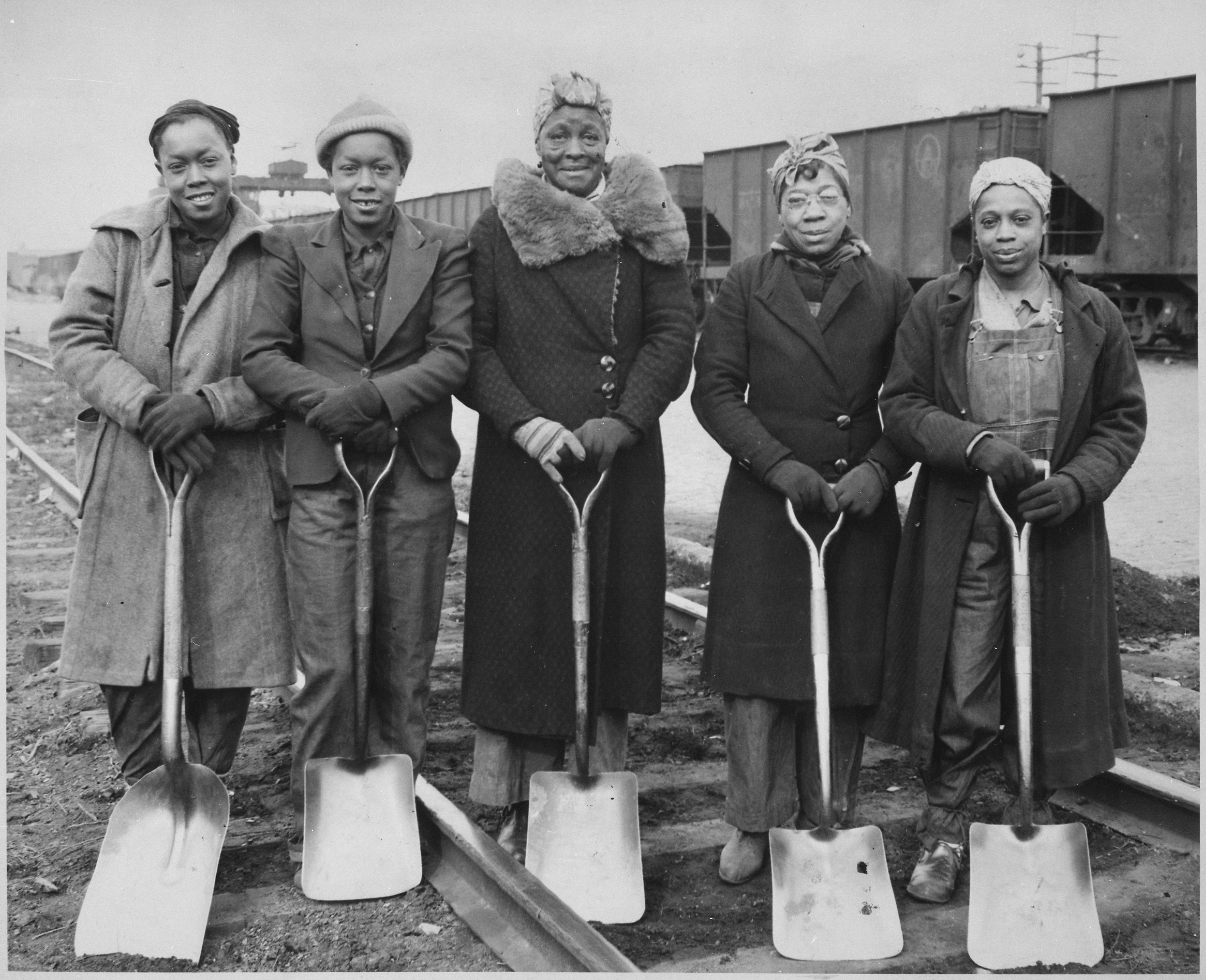
Trackwomen, 1943. Baltimore & Ohio Railroad Company

- Bridge inspector
- Gandy dancer
- Length runner
- Railway lubricator
- Section gangs
- Signal maintainer
- Track inspector
- Traquero
- Platelayer
- Navvy (navigator)
- Track foreman
- Structure Maintainer
- Lighting Maintainer
- Escalator and Elevator Maintainer
- Electronic Equipment Maintainer
- Telephone Maintainer
- Turnstiles Maintainer
- Mechanical Maintainer Group "C"
- Mechanical Maintainer Group "B"
- Power Maintainer

== Alphabetical ==
=== B ===
- Boilerman
- Brakeman
- Bridge inspector
- Bridge tender

=== C ===
- Chief Mechanical Engineer
- Chief fireman
- Conductor
- Carmen

=== D ===
- Dispatcher
- Train dispatching

=== E ===
- Engine driver

=== F ===
- Fettler: Railway Maintenance Worker
- Fireman
- Flagman
- Freight Conductor

=== G ===
- Ganger
- Geoff
- Geotechnical Engineer

=== L ===
- Length runner
- Locomotive Superintendent (Chief Mechanical Engineer)
- Locomotive engineer

=== P ===
- Platelayer
- Porter

=== R ===
- Railroad engineer (engine driver)
- Railway lubricator
- Redcap Boy
- Revenue Protection Inspector
- Road foreman of engines

=== S ===
- Section gang
- Secondman
- Signal maintainer
- Signalman
- Station agent
- Station master

=== T ===
- Track foreman

== See also ==
- Rail transport operations
- Lists of occupations
