= Freight conductor =

A freight conductor is a person who is employed by a railroad. The freight conductor is the lead employee assigned to a freight train, and is responsible for the smooth operation of the assignment, which includes reviewing schedules and maintaining communication with the train's crew members.

== Freight conductors specialties ==
(1) Yard Foreman - A yard foreman, is a freight conductor that has been assigned to a yard job. Yard jobs are divided into 2 categories; Switcher and Industry Switcher.

Yard Foreman Switcher - A Yard foreman assigned to a yard switcher crew is responsible for sorting inbound trains. This is done by pulling out a single track and placing the rail cars from that track into other assigned tracks, as directed by the Yardmaster.

Switch/local Conductor - A switch/local conductor is responsible for servicing local industry customers close to their assigned rail yard. This is done by gathering rail cars from one or more tracks within the yard, as assigned by the Yardmaster, then transporting those rail cars to the assigned industries; and placing them in their designated "spots". The Industry switcher is also responsible for "pulling" the cars that the customer has "Ordered Out", and returning them to the rail yard for classification and placement in an outbound train.

(2) Remote Control Foreman - A remote control yard foreman, has the same duties as a "Yard Foreman". The difference is that he or she also controls the movement of a remote control locomotive with an operator control unit. Typically the remote control engine is unoccupied. Its movements are protected by a remote control zone that the remote control foreman has control of.

(3) The road conductor is responsible for the safe and efficient movement of trains from one railway platform to another, generally located in another city or state. The Road foreman is the employee in charge of the assignment and is responsible to ensure that all safety guidelines are met, as well as ensuring that all of the rail cars within the train are "Set Out" at the appropriate stop; often referred to as a "Terminal".

== About the occupation ==
The average rate of pay for a freight conductor is approximately $30.00 per hour in USA. The average pay is over four times that of the $7.25 nationwide Minimum Wage level of the United States. Freight conductors are limited to no more than 12 hours on duty by the Federal Railroad Administration, which is the federal agency assigned to monitor railroad activity, and ensure compliance with all federal, state, and local regulations regarding the movement of freight over rail. Freight conductors in USA typically work 45 to 60 hours per week over the course of 6 days.

Upon employment that individual will continue with his or her education by completing an average of 12 to 14 weeks of on the job training. During this training the newly hired freight conductor will learn the layout of his or her assigned territory, and all yards contained within that territory or terminal. Upon completion of training he or she will be tested for the depth of their newly acquired skills, and must be certified by their employer as a "Qualified" freight conductor.

== Finland ==
In the Finnish state railways, there are only yard freight conductors. Road trains typically have a one-man crew, or 2 engineers. The rate of pay consist of a monthly flat payment, extra pay for night/weekend work, and possible overtime paid by the hours. The average earnings for freight conductor is 20,000-35,000 euros a year. Time on duty is limited to no more than 10 hours per shift. Typically freight conductors work about 40 hours a week, 3-5 starts. About 80% work scheduled assignments
