= Eileen O'Donnell =

Irish model

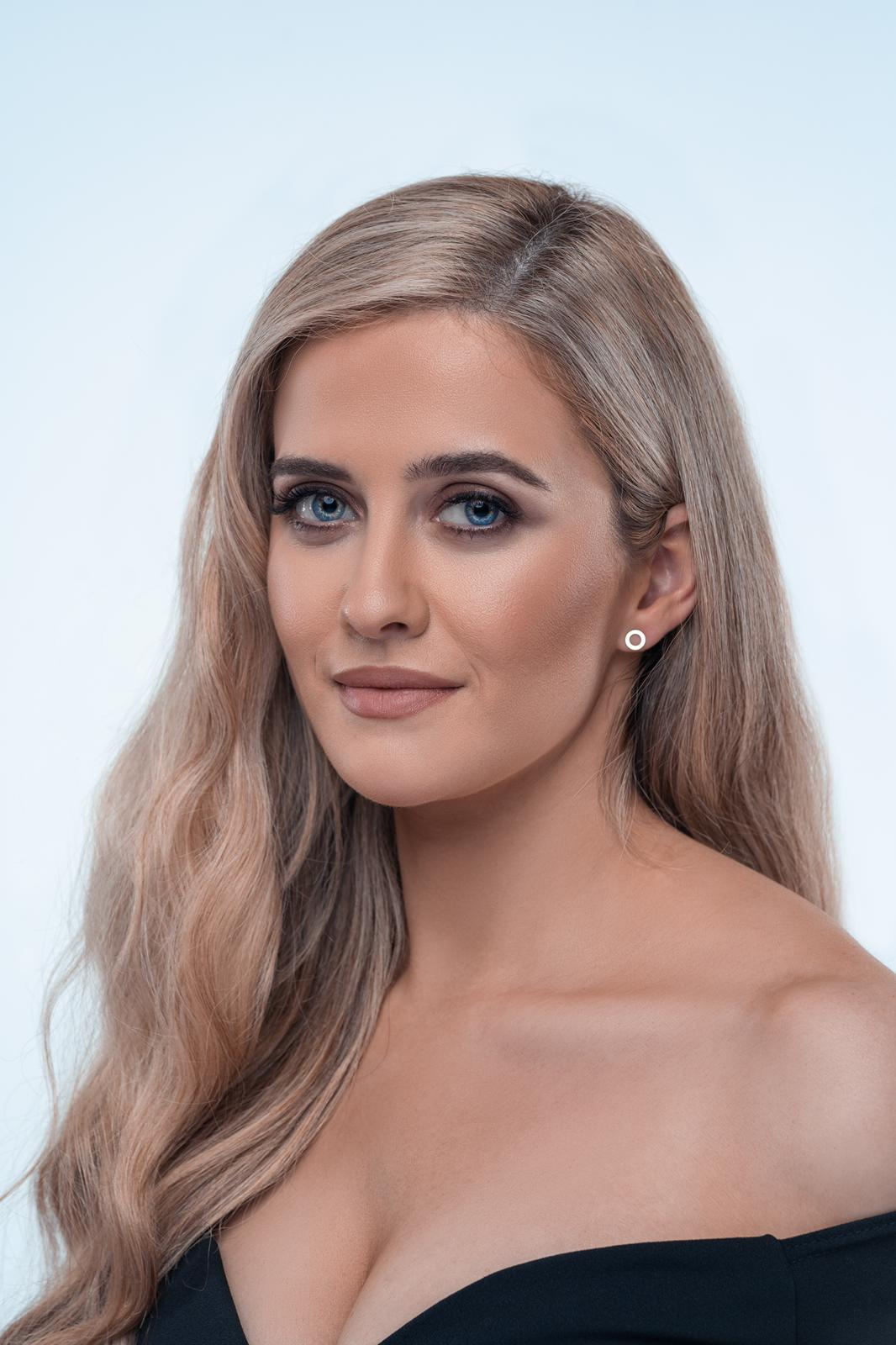
- O'Donnell in 2020
- Born: Eileen Mary O'Donnell; 1 July 1993 (age 33); Derry, Northern Ireland
- Education: Ulster University (BSc)
- Occupation: Model
- Height: 1.65 m (5 ft 5 in)
- Beauty pageant titleholder
- Title: Miss Bikini Ireland 2017; Miss Earth Ireland 2020
- Agency: VAVA influence
- Years active: 2011–present
- Hair color: Dark brown
- Eye color: Green
- Major competitions: Miss Bikini Ireland 2017 (Winner); Miss Earth Ireland 2020 (Winner); Miss Earth 2020 (Unplaced)
- Website: Official website

Eileen Mary O'Donnell (born 1 July 1993), known professionally as Eileen O'Donnell, is an Irish model and beauty pageant titleholder. O'Donnell started her career in 2011 and has since modelled in the categories of fashion, skincare and swimwear. She has gone on to collaborate with numerous notable brands including Pretty Little Thing, GymKing, MVMT Watches, The Couture Club, Ziaja Skincare, Benefit Cosmetics, amongst others.

Since 2016, she has represented Ireland in a number of international competitions and pageantries. She won the title of Miss Bikini Ireland in 2017 and participated in the Swimsuit USA International Model Search in 2018. She was crowned Miss Earth Ireland 2020.

== Early life and education ==
O'Donnell was born in 1993 and raised in Derry, the second-largest city in Northern Ireland for the entirety of her childhood. In 2002 at the age of 9, she took part in a cross-community project that enabled her to experience life in the United States for 6 weeks.

== Modelling and pageantry career ==
In 2016 O'Donnell expressed her interest in participating in the 5th annual Miss Bikini Ireland competition in which she finished in 3rd place. She entered again in the following year for the 6th annual competition. After entering Miss Bikini Ireland 2017, O'Donnell was crowned the winner, picking up a €15,000 reward and an all-expenses-paid trip to the world finals of Swimsuit USA (SUSA) International for the chance of winning a prize worth $80,000.

After winning Miss Bikini Ireland 2017, O'Donnell qualified for competing in Swimsuit USA International Model 2017 in which she finished in the top 30 finalists. She re-qualified to represent Ireland in the following year. The competition was held in Mexico City and 70 women from a total of 50 countries participated. O'Donnell, placed 16 in the competition, however, states she was grateful for the opportunity as it opened up doors for her in her career.

In 2020, she was chosen to participate in the 20th annual Miss Earth competition and represent her home country of Ireland. The pageant was hosted by James Deakin and telecast on TV5 and FOXlife, with a virtual tour of the world in the opening number and featured the delegates in their eco-angel and respective national costumes. She came third place for the category of swimsuit and was crowned the winner of Miss Earth Ireland 2020. As Miss Earth Ireland, O'Donnell campaigned to reduce waste in Ireland.

== Activism ==
As the face of Miss Earth 2020, Eileen has campaigned for education as being a basic need for students from all around the world. O'Donnell also advocates on environmental issues, waste management specifically. She has used the word "WASTE" to be an acronym for "We All Should Treasure Earth" in her advocacy.

== Awards and positions ==
Eileen O'Donnell award and positions
Year	Association	Category	Result
2016	Miss Bikini	Miss Bikini Ireland	3rd place
2017	Miss Bikini	Miss Bikini Ireland	Won
2017	Swimsuit USA	Miss Swimsuit International Model Search	30th place
2018	Swimsuit USA	Miss Swimsuit International Model Search	16th place
2020	Miss Earth 2020	Miss Earth Ireland	Won
