= Gedalio Grinberg =

American businessperson

Gedalio "Gerry" Grinberg (September 26, 1931 – January 4, 2009) was a Cuban born watchmaker who was the founder and chairman of the Movado Group, based in Paramus, New Jersey, US.

Grinberg was born in Quivicán, Cuba on September 26, 1931. At age 15, he sold an alarm clock for a customer who sought one for $15. He was able to obtain the clock through his father's jewelry shop, which led to Grinberg starting an alarm clock business. He didn't make any money selling his first clock, but he established a market for the alarm clocks from the referrals that came with his first sale and that became his business. Grinberg recounted in a 2001 article about his first job how this taught him the importance of honesty and of word of mouth as a way to build a business.

He attended the University of Havana and switched his business to specialize in watches.

After the Cuban Revolution, he was questioned and threatened by members of the Fidel Castro-led government who offered him a government job. Grinberg declined and fled to Miami on August 16, 1960 with his wife, Sonia Crugliac and two children.

He initially struggled, but jumped onto an opportunity to establish a Piaget distributorship in New York City with two other refugees, starting their business as the Piaget Watch Company in 1961 with the contents of a single suitcase. Their company, renamed North American Watch Company in 1967, was initially a distributor of watches for Swiss manufacturers, but the firm later acquired the Ebel, and Concord brands, as well as manufacturing watches under brands it licensed, such as Hugo Boss.

After reading Vance Packard's 1959 book, The Status Seekers, and its message of how Americans were increasingly looking to project their status, Grinberg realized that he could convince Americans that wearing a quality watch was as much of a status symbol as owning a Cadillac in one's driveway. A 1988 Forbes profile cited by The New York Times described how "Grinberg helped make Americans conscious of their watches and made the glint of gold on a male wrist a status symbol" changing the American perception of a watch as a gift one received for their high school graduation.

As part of an effort to combat Japanese watchmakers, Grinberg invested in ultrathin quartz watches, culminating in 1980 with the Concord Delirium IV, which at 0.98 millimeters thick was the first watch thinner than one millimeter.

After acquiring Movado in 1983, the firm was renamed the Movado Group. Under Grinberg, Movado heavily promoted the "Museum Watch" a modernistic markless black face with a single gold dot at the 12 o'clock position based on a design by Nathan George Horwitt in the collection of the Museum of Modern Art, selling millions of the watches in dozens of different versions.

Grinberg donated an 18-foot clock tower, located across from the Lincoln Center for the Performing Arts in Dante Park at Broadway and West 64th Street. The triangular tower, designed by the architect Philip Johnson, has four clock faces — two on one side, and one on each of the other two sides — each bearing the Movado name.

Grinberg died on January 4, 2009. In addition to his wife, he was survived by his sons, Efraim and Alex, both of Manhattan; his daughter, Miriam Phalen of Manhattan; his sister, Sara Sunshine of Queens; and six grandchildren.
