= Mavado =

Mavado may refer to:

- Mavado (singer)
- Mavado, a character in the Mortal Kombat series

== See also ==
- Movado
