= Dante Park =

Public park in Manhattan, New York

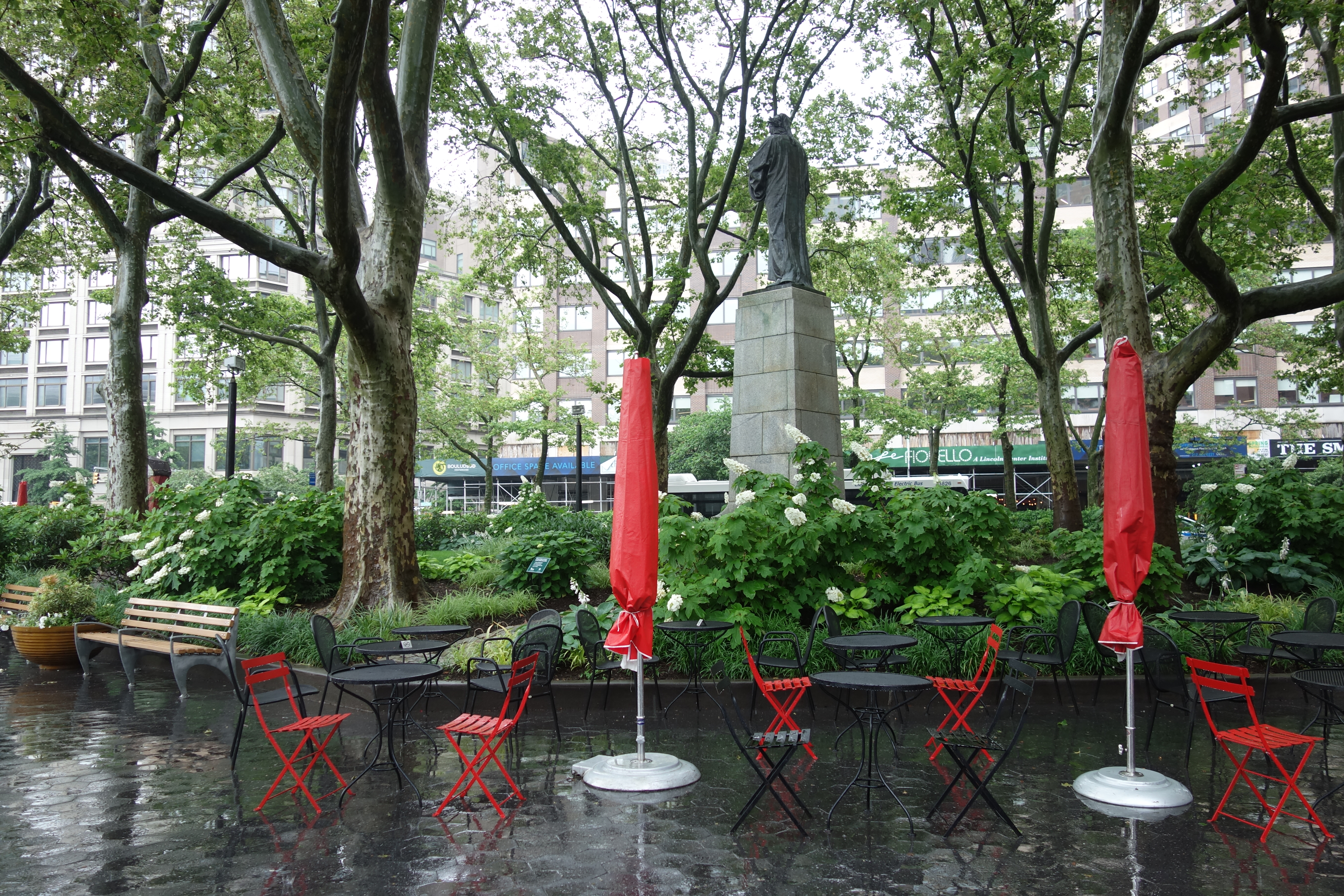
- Statue of author and poet Dante Alighieri in Dante Park opposite the Lincoln Center for the Performing Arts
- Interactive map of Dante Park
- Location: Upper West Side, Manhattan, New York City
- Coordinates: 40°46′19″N 73°58′57″W
- Area: 0.14 acres (0.057 ha)
- Created: 1921
- Operator: New York City Department of Parks and Recreation

Dante Park is a public park in Manhattan, New York City, located on the Upper West Side in front of Lincoln Center near Central Park. It hosts two works of public art: a statue of the Italian poet Dante Alighieri dedicated in 1921 and a clock sculpture donated by the Movado Group in 1999.

The park hosts concert series and holiday light shows.

== Creation and art installations ==
Dante Park was established in 1921 by Italian-Americans in honor of the Italian poet Dante Alighieri (1265–1321) on a triangular plot of land opposite Lincoln Center, bounded by Broadway, Columbus Avenue, and West 63rd Street. Carlo Barsotti, the editor of the Italian-American newspaper Il Progresso Italo-Americano, originally wanted to erect a much more substantial statue of Dante to be placed in Times Square around 1912, but because of fundraising difficulties opted for a smaller statue completed by Ettore Ximenes to be erected at Broadway and West 63rd Street in 1921, the 600th anniversary of Dante's death. Dante Park underwent renovations in the early 1990s funded by the neighboring Radisson Empire Hotel, with the sculpture also repaired.

A Dante Alighieri statue of the same casting as Dante Park is featured at Meridian Hill Park in Washington, D.C.. The statue is of Beaux Arts design.

In 1999, Gedalio Grinberg, chairman of the watchmaker Movado Group, donated a stylized clock for installation in Dante Park. The 21-and-a-half-foot bronze clock, entitled Time Sculpture, contains four faces with Movado branding and was created by architect Philip Johnson, who had designed the Lincoln Center 30 years prior. Although the work was criticized by community advocates as commercial, Grinberg promised to provide $250,000 annually to the Lincoln Center.

== Public uses ==
In August 2020, the park hosted New York Philharmonic's first public concert since New York City locked down amid the COVID-19 pandemic.

Dante's Park

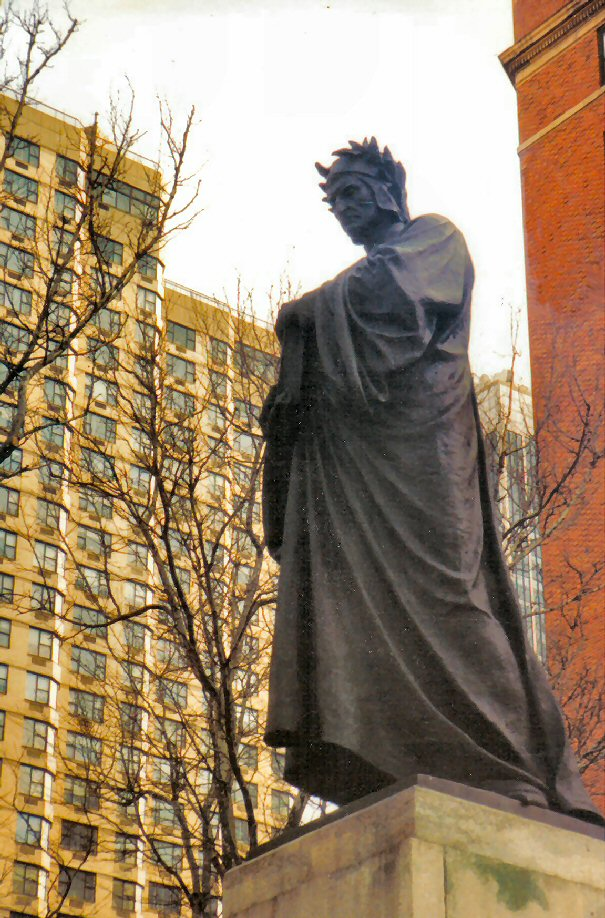
Dante

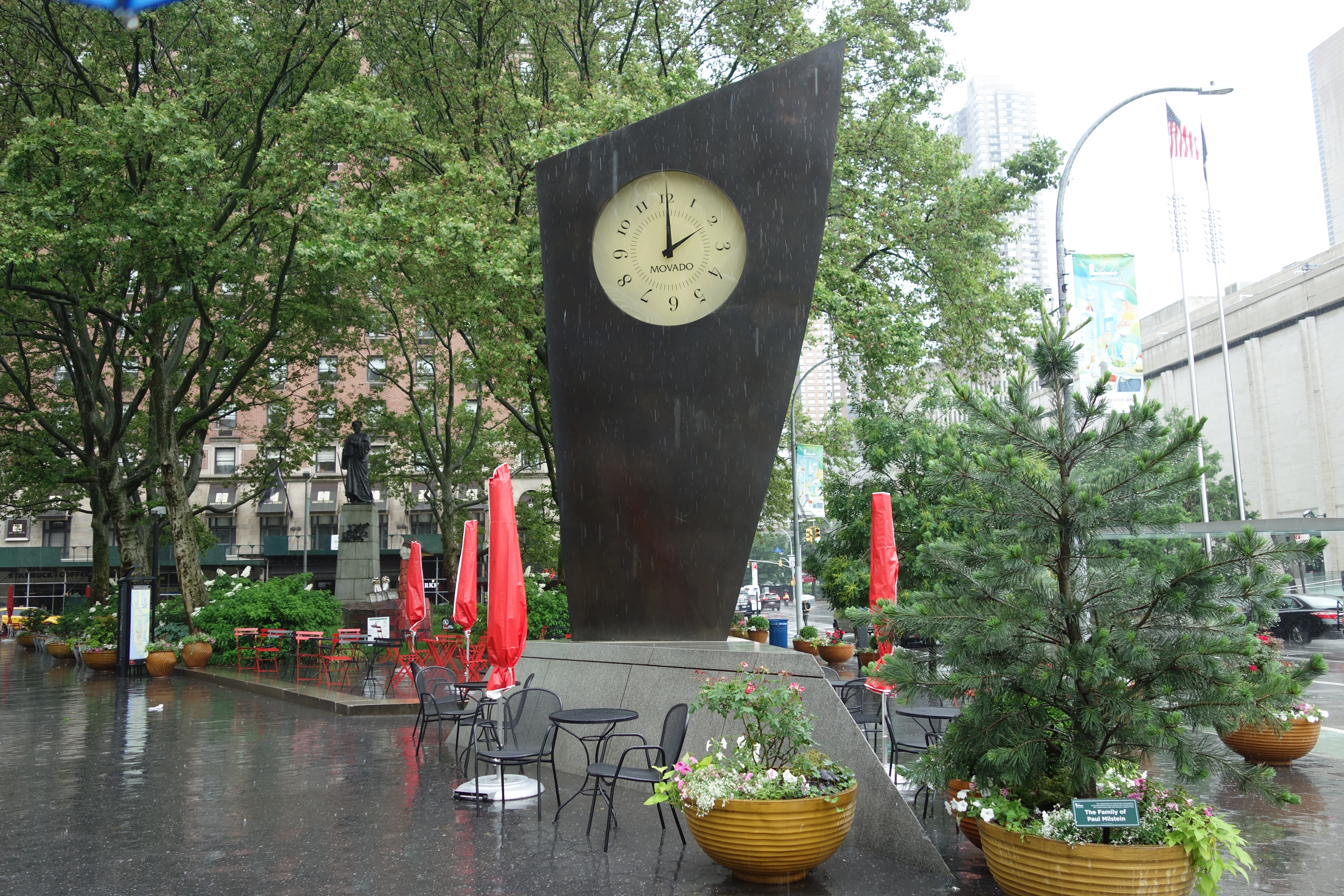
"Time Sculpture" (1999)

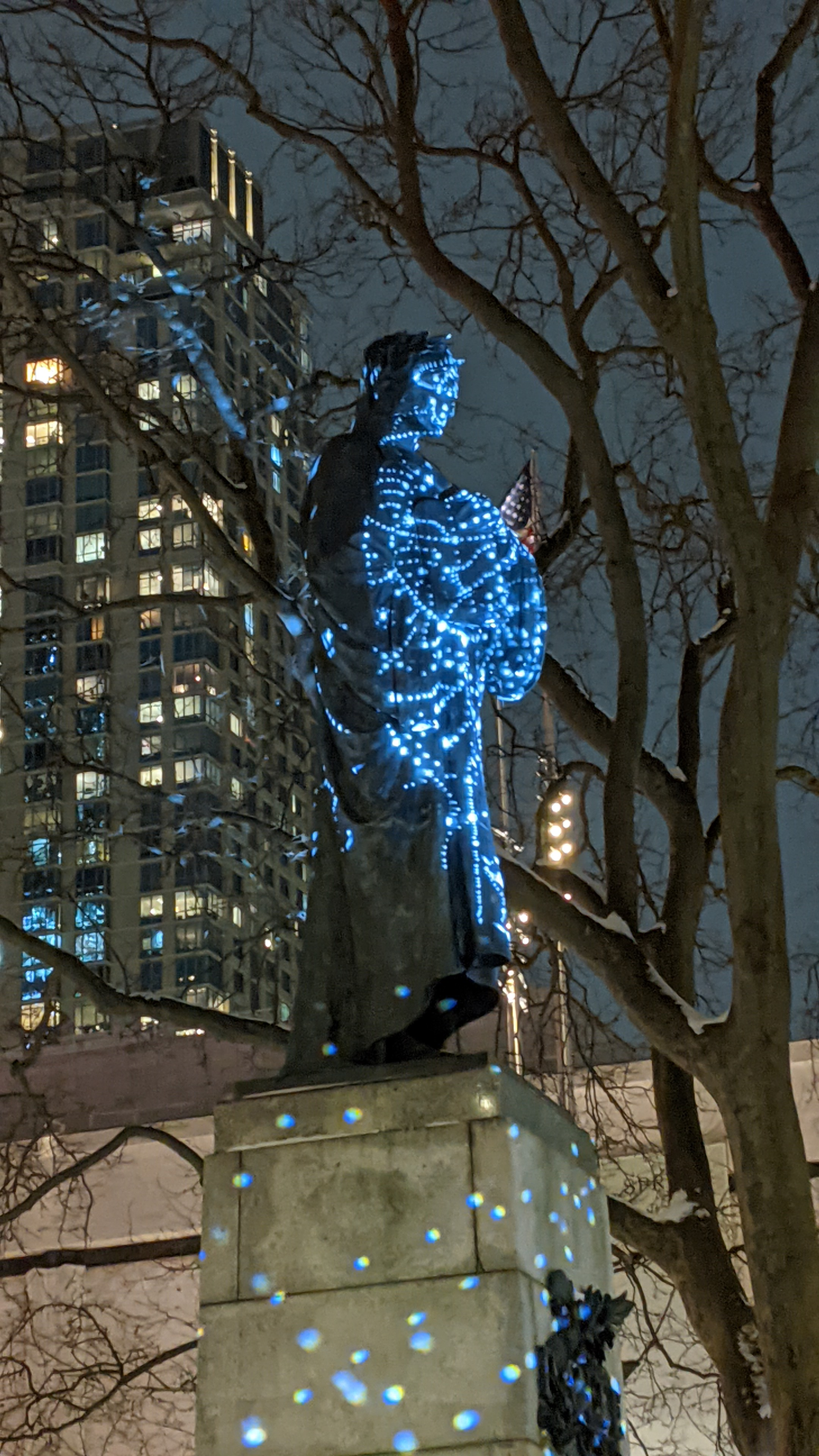
Holiday lights, 2021

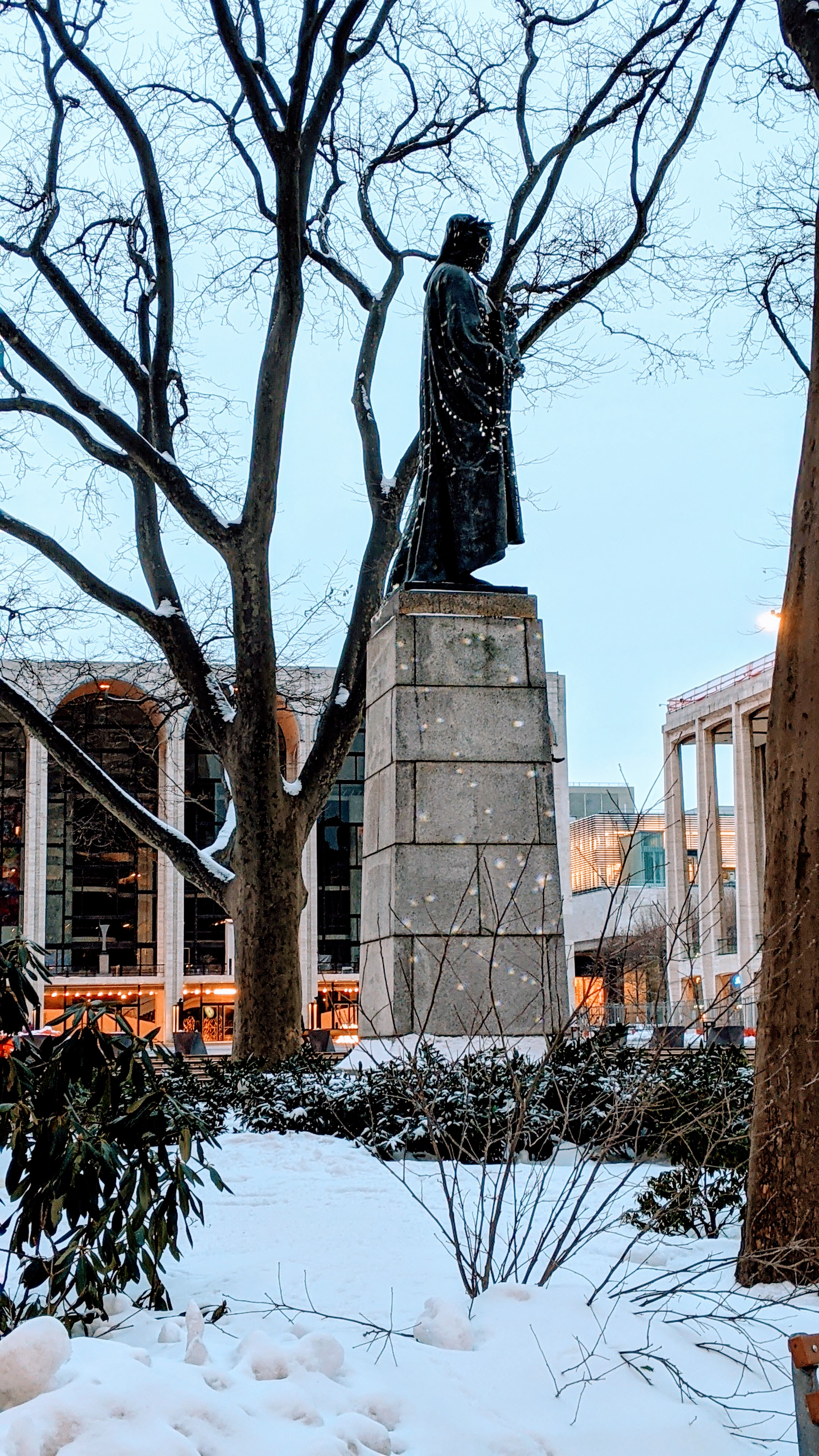
Dante in snow
