= Concord Watch =

Swiss luxury goods company

Concord Watch Company SA
- Type: Subsidiary
- Industry: Watch Manufacturing
- Founded: Biel, Switzerland 1908
- Number of locations: 120 stores (2008)
- Area served: Worldwide
- Key people: Alex Grinberg (CEO)
- Parent: Subsidiary of Movado
- Website: www.concord.com

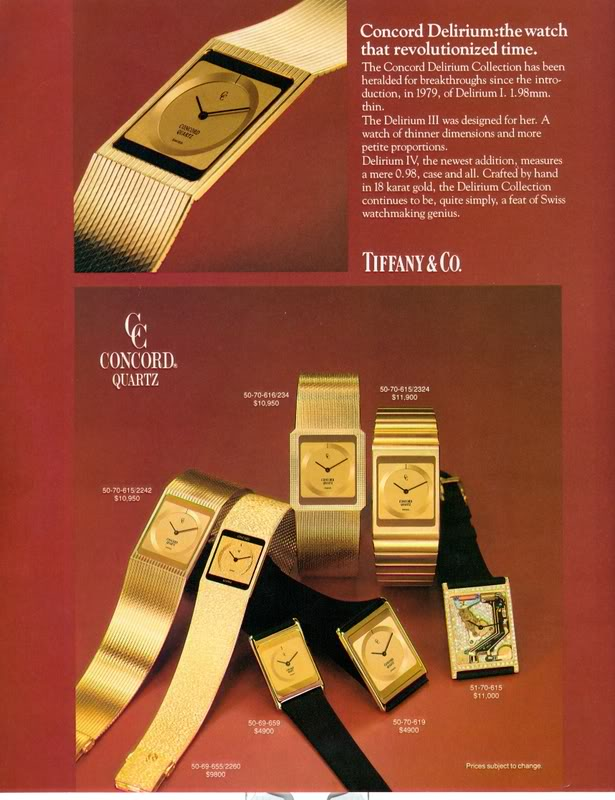
An ad for Tiffany & Co of the Concord Delirium. Dubbed the world's thinnest watch, it ranged from $4,900 to over $20,000 for customized models with diamonds.

Concord Watch Company is a Swiss luxury goods company that is part of the Movado group, which produces and distributes Movado, Ebel, Coach, and Hugo Boss-branded watches. Founded in 1908, Concord was purchased in 1970 by the North American Watch Company, which also distributed the Piaget and Corum lines of watches. From the late 1970s to the late 1980s, Concord produced luxury quartz watches. Flagship quartz models such as the Concord Centurion and Concord Delirium ranged from $2,000 to $20,000, surpassing the price of base automatic Rolex, Cartier and Omega wristwatches. By the 1990s, Concord watches fell out of style and grew obsolete amidst the rebranding of the company. While the brand still exists today, it never regained its market position nor visibility that it once had.

== History ==
Founded in 1908 in Biel, Switzerland, the brand was created to design watches with the American market in mind. Concord has made several innovations in its history, such as being one of the first “private label” luxury watches to incorporate precious metals and gems in its watches. It was also the first company to make a wristwatch out of coins.

In 1915, Concord started working with companies like Van Cleef & Arpels, Tiffany and Cartier on provide them with high quality watches made out of precious metals and gems. In 1942, President Truman gifted Concord watches to Stalin and Churchill during World War II peace talks, solidifying their position as a leading luxury watch.

The North American Watch Company purchased Concord in 1970. While the company struggled initially, it transitioned into a luxury quartz watch company, and during the quartz crisis it attained a large market share despite other competitors like Rolex. Throughout the 1980s, Concord watches became some of the most recognizable watches on the American luxury watch market, seeing massive sales in luxury stores throughout the Americas. While the majority of Swiss watch makers were in financial trouble due to the quartz crisis Concord took advantage of the situation by producing some of the most expensive quartz watches on the market. By the early 1980s, the North American Watch Company had the largest advertising budget of any Swiss watch company, spending over $14 million annually to attract celebrity endorsements from Jimmy Connors, Bjorn Borg, Joe Montana, Tom Landry and Martha Graham in such expensive publications like New York, Texas Monthly, Architectural Digest, Town and Country and Business Week while appearing in TV shows such as Miami Vice, Charlie's Angels, The Love Boat, Dynasty and Hill Street Blues.

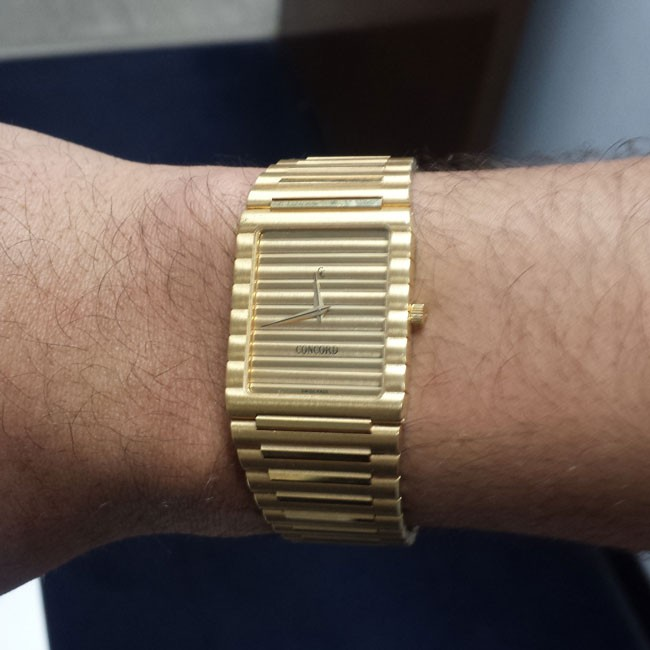
An example of an 18K Concord Centurion quartz watch. The advertised price in the New York Magazine in December 1982 was $7950 USD.

In 1979, it had a major breakthrough with the invention of the Delirium Watch, which was the thinnest watch ever made at the time at 1.98 mm thick. Subsequently, Delirium 2 was released, which was even thinner at 1.5 mm. Another notable watch was the Concord Centurion, an ultra-thin sports watch introduced in 1979 that bore a resemblance to the Piaget Polo, the latter billed as the most expensive mass-produced luxury watch.

By the 1990s, Concord watches began to fade as the quartz crisis came to a close and the bold Concord look fell out of favor. In addition to being the parent of Concord, the North American Watch Company sought to focus more on mid- to high-range watches suited to middle class Americans, as opposed to luxury watches for the select few. The company faced a setback when, in 1996, the North American Watch Company rebranded as Movado, a mid range watch company that had been purchased in 1984 by the North American Watch Company. This robbed the company of their exclusive luxury watch branding. Further turmoil happened in 2004, when Movado purchased financially troubled luxury Swiss watchmaker Ebel, causing Concord to be shunned in favor of their new acquisition.

In 2007, the company made a drastic change in its vision. It closed most of its existing dealerships, as sluggish sales and lack of a specific market created a huge grey market that hurt the company’s reputation. The launch of the C1 was highly touted and targeted the ever-popular luxury sport market. The style and pricing were designed to compete with watches such as Panerai, and Hublot. With only a couple of hundred dealers worldwide, Concord was hoping for a grand relaunch into the Luxury sector. In 2008, watches ranged from between $3,500 to $30,000 in pricing.

In 2008, Concord created two new C1 pieces. The C1 Worldtimer and the C1 Gravity Tourbillon. The latter won the prestigious “Grand Prix d’Horlogerie de Geneve” as “Best design of the year 2008”. Whether this success will lead to ultimate success remains to be seen.

In 2009, Alex Grinberg was appointed as the worldwide CEO of Concord.

== Main Collection ==
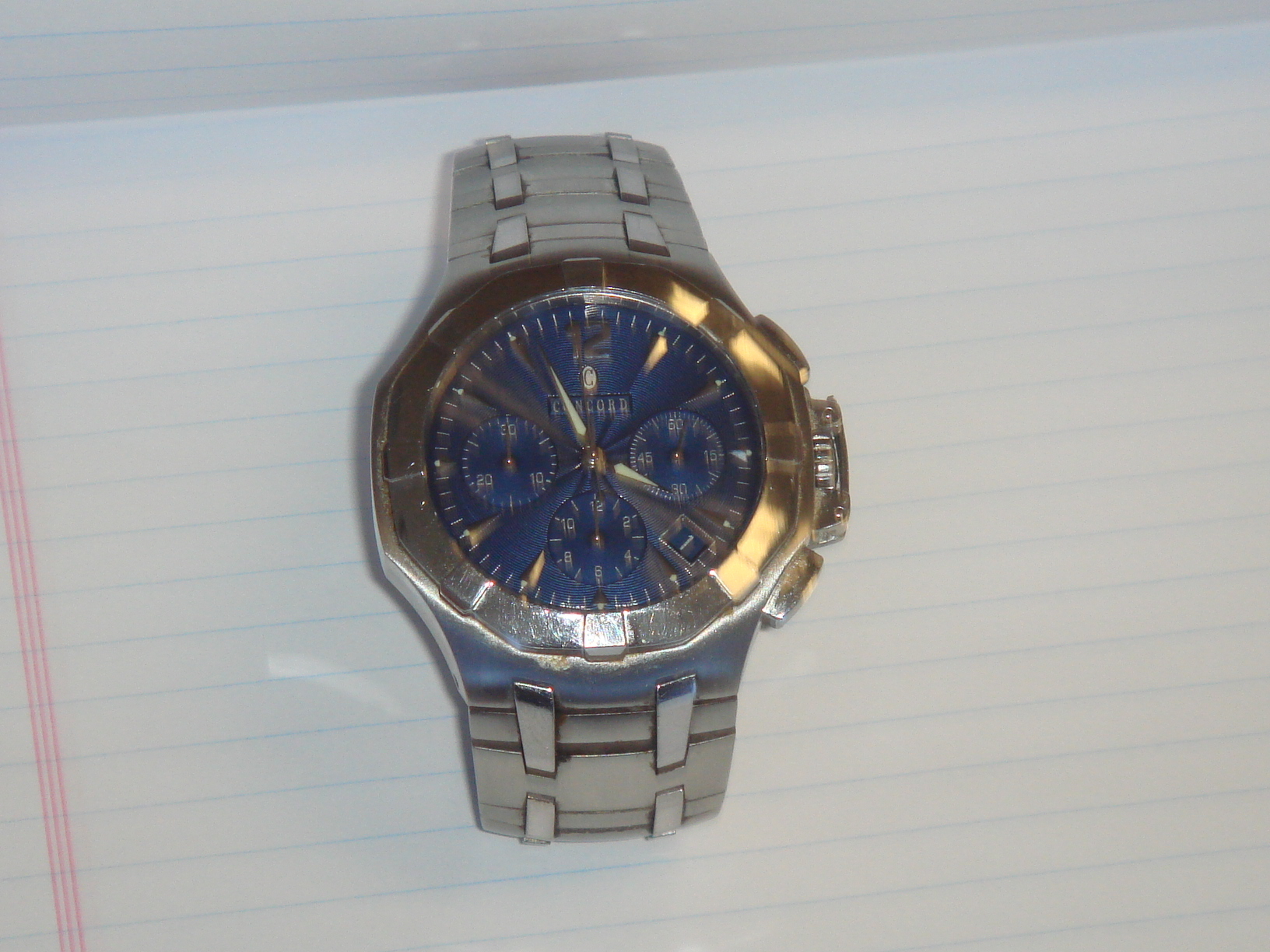
Classic Concord watch

Pre-1996

- La Costa : Luxury Dress Watch. 18K Gold or 18 K Gold with Stainless Steel, Partly with Tiffany Dial. Competition in Style, Price, and Design with Cartier's Santos Watches
- Centurion: Luxury Sportsawatch: 18K with Stainless Steel, 18K
- Delirium: Ultrathin Quartz Dresswatch: Leather, 18K, Often with Diamonds
- Mariner: Sports Activity Watch

1996–2007

- La Scala: Luxury Contemporary watch
- Saratoga: Luxury Sports watch

2007–Present

- Mariner - Redesign of their iconic Mariner line from the 1980s in classic or dive versions.
- C Series (C1 & C2) – Oversize luxury sport watch. This is the basis of the entire new collection. All new models revolve around this base case design.

== See also ==
- Movado Swiss Made
