= Ziaja =

Ziaja is a Polish surname. Notable people with the surname include:

- Anna Ziaja (born 1954), Polish painter and print maker
- Ernest Ziaja (1919–1997), Polish ice hockey player
- Wally Ziaja (born 1949), American soccer player
- Witold Ziaja (1940–2025), Polish field hockey player

== See also ==
- Ziaja (company)
