= Movado Ermeto watch =

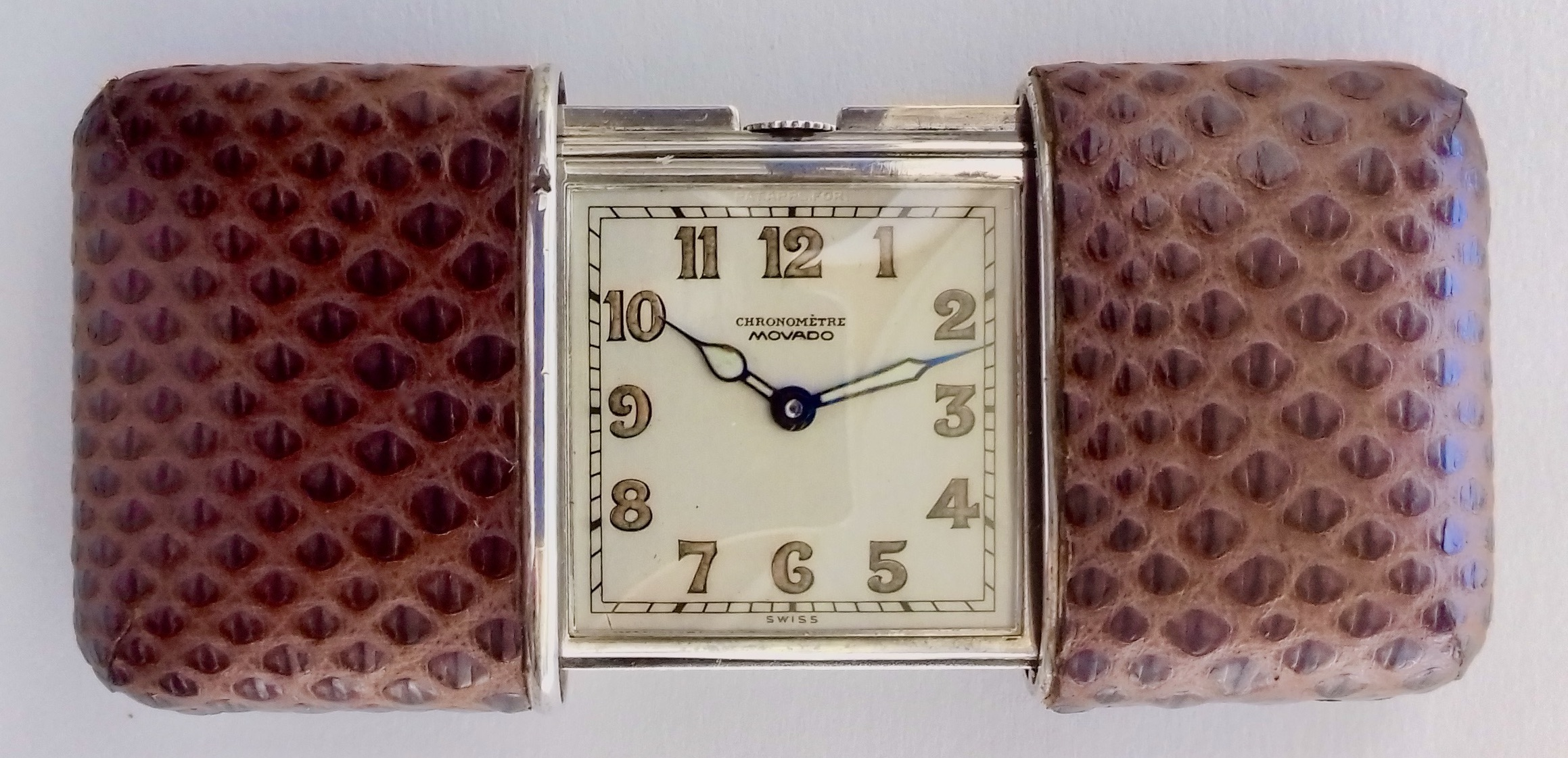
A 1928 Ermeto chronometer, silver case covered in lizard skin. "Normal" size with automatic winding system called "Non-Stop" by Movado. Watch Museum of Le Locle (Switzerland).

A Movado Ermeto watch was a pocket/purse watch manufactured between 1926 and 1985 by Movado in La Chaux-de-Fonds (Switzerland). The model, a joint creation between case maker Huguenin Frères and watch maker Movado, was introduced in 1926. It won the Grand Prix at the 1929 Barcelona International Exposition.

The trademark Ermeto derives from the Greek ερμητικός, transliterated as ermētikós, which means "hermetic, sealed", in reference to the characteristics of the case design, emphasizing the watch protection against dust, moisture and shocks, although it was not hermetic in the strict sense of the term. The rectangular case is made up of two sliding covers enclosing the timepiece inside.

The Ermeto range comprised four sizes, from smaller to bigger (approximate dimensions with the case closed included for reference purposes only, they may vary depending on each unit): "Baby" (43 x 26 mm), "Normal" (48 x 34 mm), "Master" (54 x 37 mm) and "Pullman" (100 x 70 mm). The latter a desk clock with an 8-day movement. The "Baby" was intended mainly for ladies' handbags whereas the "Normal" was promoted as a unisex model.

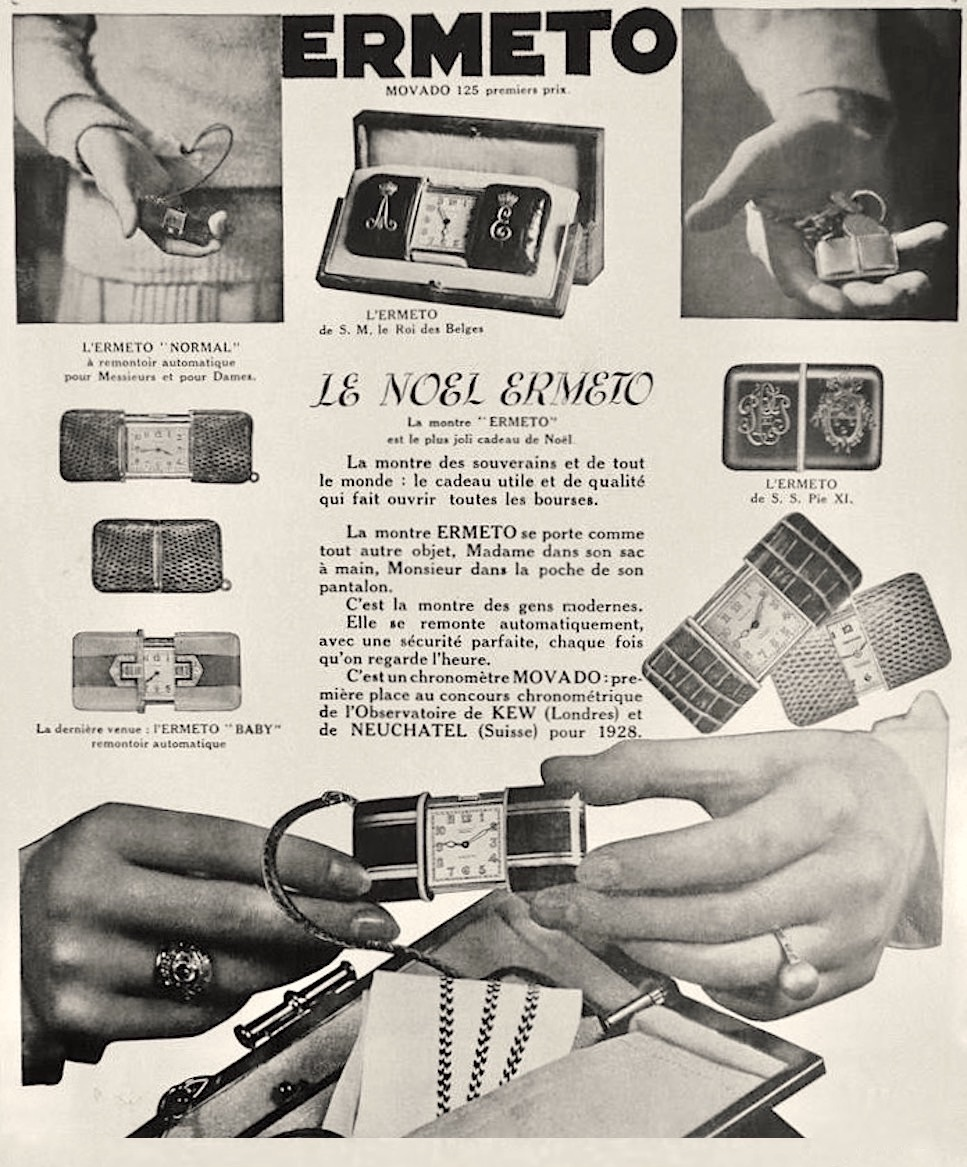
1929 ad in French showing the watches of the then King of Belgium and Pope Pius XI. Below the woman's photo the footnote reads: "The "Normal" Ermeto in automatic winding for Gentlemen and for Ladies", promoting it as a unisex model.

Unlike many of its Swiss competitors, Movado was at that time a manufacture d'horlogerie, making its own in-house movements, and so the Ermeto range was fitted with the company's different calibres according to the size of the case and complications added. Although movements from Lemania and A. Schild were used in the "Pullman" with alarm, and from A. Schild in the Ermetophon as well. Those complications included a triple calendar called Calendermeto ("Normal" size), an alarm used in the Jumbo ("Pullman" size) and the Ermetophon ("Normal" size), and the date, as seen in the Ermetoscope ("Normal" size) featuring a glass with date magnifier, and Calendine ("Baby" size).

The watch was manufactured in a variety of metal cases such as platinum, gold, silver, vermeil, steel and base metal, coverings of reptile skins, galuchat, etc., and finishings, such as lacquer, niello, enamel, guilloché enamel, etc. Although the case rectangular shape remained unchanged during its lifetime, the style of dials and hands evolved with times and, if original to the watch, help to date a certain piece.

The timepiece was conceived to be used with or without a chain to be placed in a pocket, purse or bag. Many incorporated a folding hinged strut in the back of the watch itself, so when the covers were opened, allowed the timepiece to be placed on a desk or bedside table, acting as a travel clock.

Movado's advertising of the period claimed that the Ermeto represented "Le troisième âge de la montre" (The third age of the watch), following the era of the pocket watch and the wrist watch.

The product's success made that firms such as Cartier, Hermès, Tiffany, Van Cleef & Arpels, etc. were interested in it, hence the Ermetos sold with those brand names in the dial. Sometimes it bore the name of a given retailer too.

Among the historical figures known to have owned an Ermeto were Pope Pius XI, King Albert I of Belgium and his consort the Queen Elizabeth, King Edward VIII, Clara Bow, Andy Warhol, who owned at least six different models, and Prince Charles, whose watch was stolen from St. James Palace in 1994 and later returned to him. It is said that an early model was presented to Albert Einstein.

== History ==
=== "Hermetic" case by Huguenin Frères ===
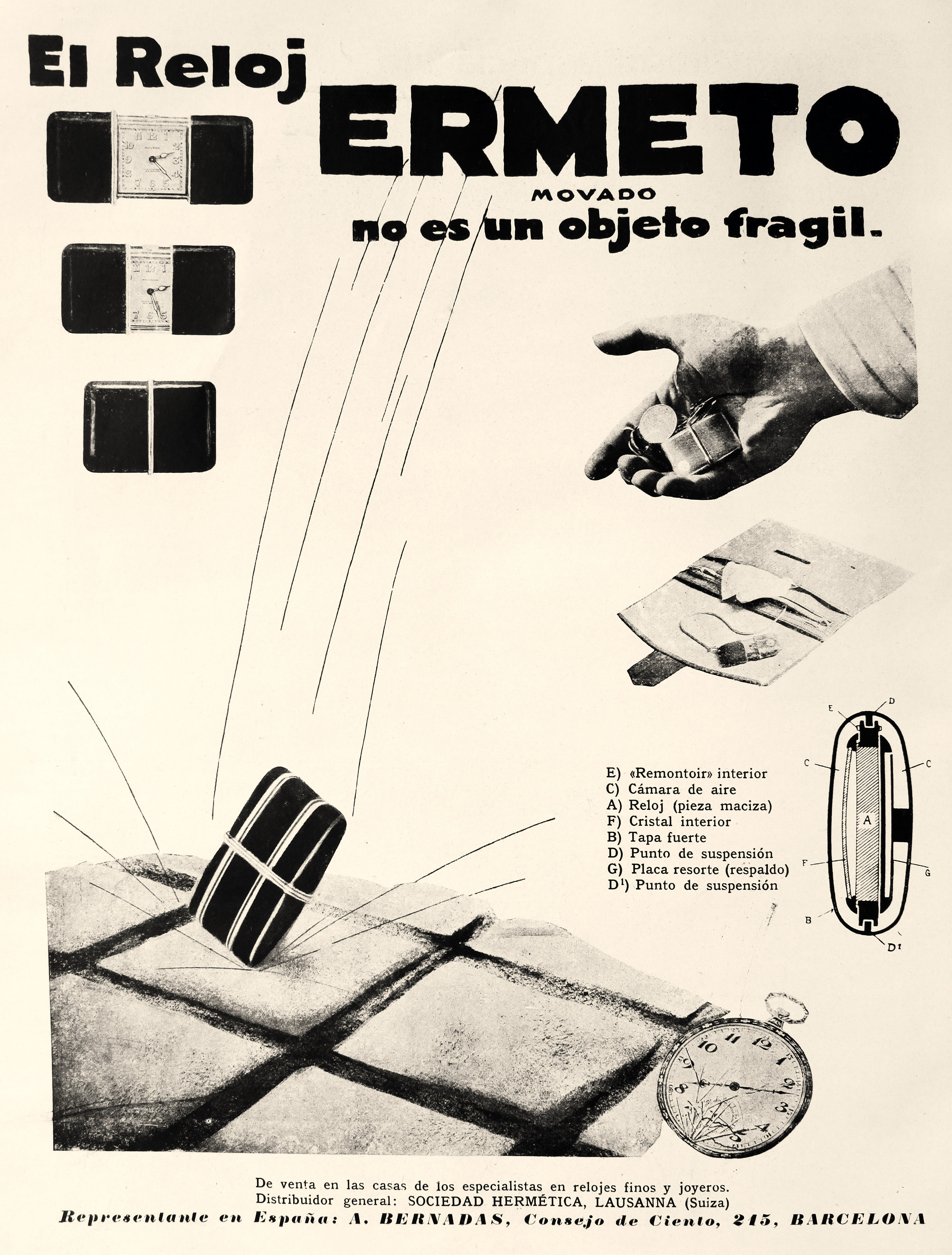
A 1929 advertisement in Spanish with a diagram at right showing a section of the piece: E) Inner winding. C) Air chamber. A) Watch (solid piece). F) Inner glass. B) Hard cover. D) Suspension point. G) Strut. D)^{1} Suspension point.

The Ermeto's case design was first filed in Germany on 12 October 1926 by Swiss case maker Hugenin Frères of Le Locle. Patent number 443555 published 2 May 1927. The patent was also applied in England and Switzerland in 1927.

It consisted of a watch contained within a rectangular case. The timepiece own case, comprising movement, dial, winding and hand-setting mechanism, forms an autonomous unit which in turn is enclosed by a two-part metal case. These parts can be drawn apart, like curtains, to reveal the dial and check the time.

The idea was offered to different watch makers but only Movado took it up. Initially, Huguenin Frères had developed it as a pendant watch but, after some modifications, Movado launched it in 1926 as the timepiece we know today.

In 1930, an improvement was made by the case maker, applying a patent in Switzerland for an automatic strut or leg that displayed when the two covers of the case were opened, and returned to a folding position when they were closed. Other Ermetos have a non automatic strut or none at all, like the oldest ones.

=== Automatic winding case by Movado ===
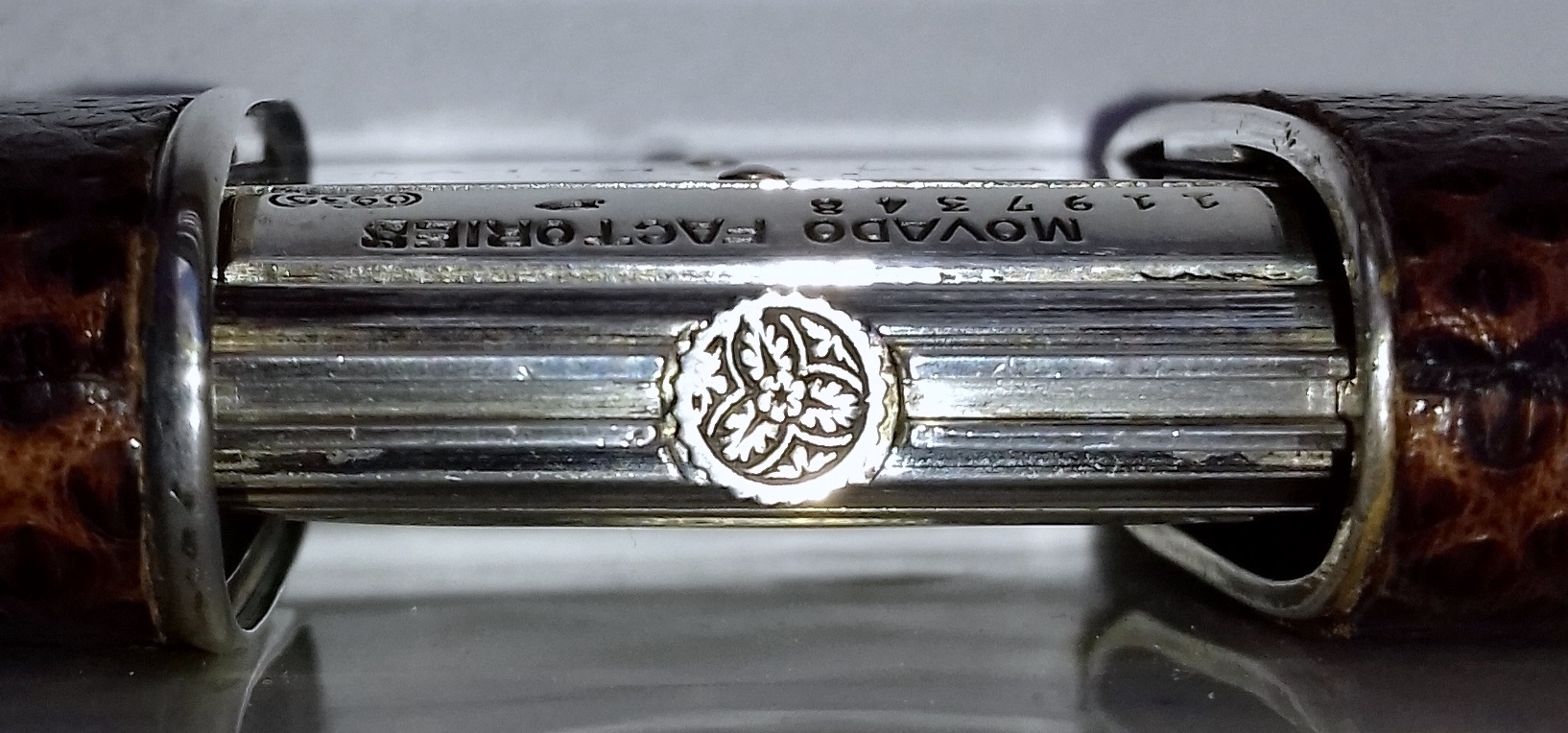
Crown detail of a 1928 "Normal" size Ermeto. The automatic version usually feature a crown engraved with three tiny oak leaves and a flower in the centre. The non automatic, a plain, undecorated crown.

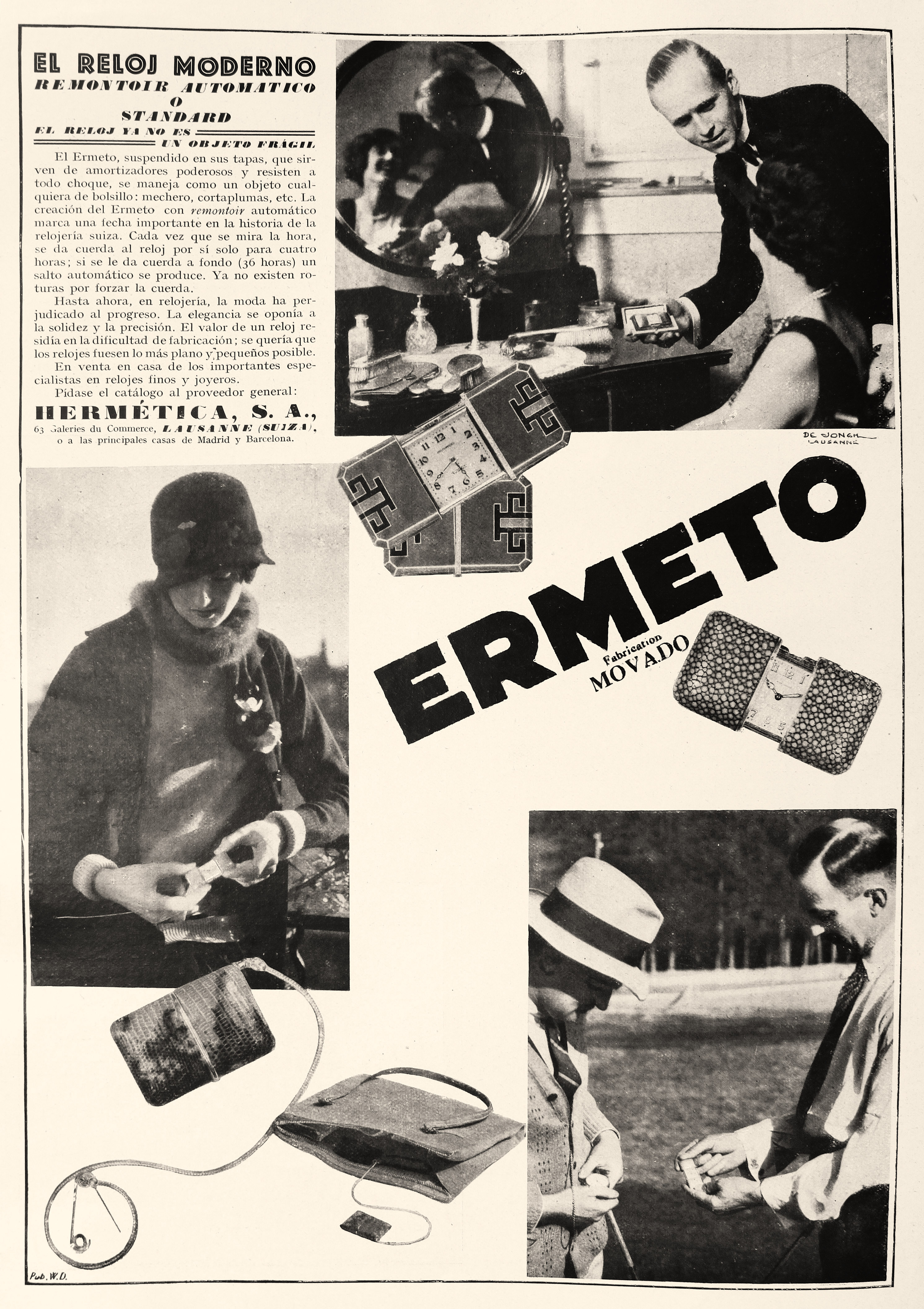
A 1929 advertisement in Spanish, heading telling: The modern watch, Automatic or standard winding, The watch is not a fragile object anymore.

In 1927, Isidore Ditesheim, brother of Achille Ditesheim founder of Movado, invented a mechanism by which the movement could be wound with the opening and closing of the case, thus making unnecessary the manual winding.

When the two sliding halves of the outer case are moved back and forth, two racks, one fitted in each half, engage a pinion on the winding stem, which cause the latter to turn and so the crown turns automatically and winds the piece. Each opening and closing of the case was designed to provide four hours of running time, therefore, it was only necessary to open the watch six times a day to power it for 24 hours, significantly reducing the number of windings required for this purpose.

This new system was only available in the so-called "Baby" and "Normal" models, according to the advertising of the period. In the second, the standard manual winding was also offered.

The patent was applied both in Switzerland and the USA in late 1927. In 1928 was applied in the UK and France.

Movado's advertising praised the benefits of its new "Non-Stop" system:

The Ermeto, suspended in its covers which act as sturdy shock absorvers withstanding the most violent shocks, is handled like any other object: a lighter, a pocketknife, etc. The automatic winding Ermeto marks an important date in the history of Swiss watchmaking. Each time the hour is checked, it winds four hours by itself; if fully wound (36 hours) an automatic jump happens. There are no more breakings for overwinding. Translated from the 1929 ad in Spanish at right.

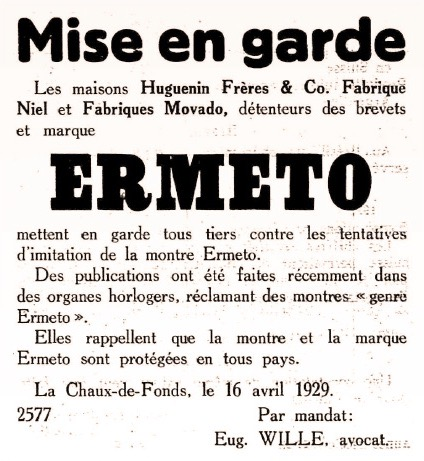
Hugenin Frères and Movado 1929 joint warning in French.

The early success of the timepiece forced Hugenin Frères and Movado to make a joint warning against copies in 1929, claiming the following:

Houses Hugenin Frères & Co. Fabrique Niel and Fabriques Movado, holders of the patents and brand ERMETO warn all third parties against attempts to imitate the Ermeto watch. Publications have recently been made in watchmaking bodies, claiming <<Ermeto type>> watches. They are reminded that the watch and the brand Ermeto are protected in all countries. La Chaux-de-Fonds, 16 April 1929. Translated from the French.

Despite this, several companies produced imitations of the watch, more than forty different models are known to have been made, but they couldn't repeat the Ermeto's success nor replicate the patented rack-winding system.
