= Ettore Ximenes =

Italian sculptor (1855–1926)

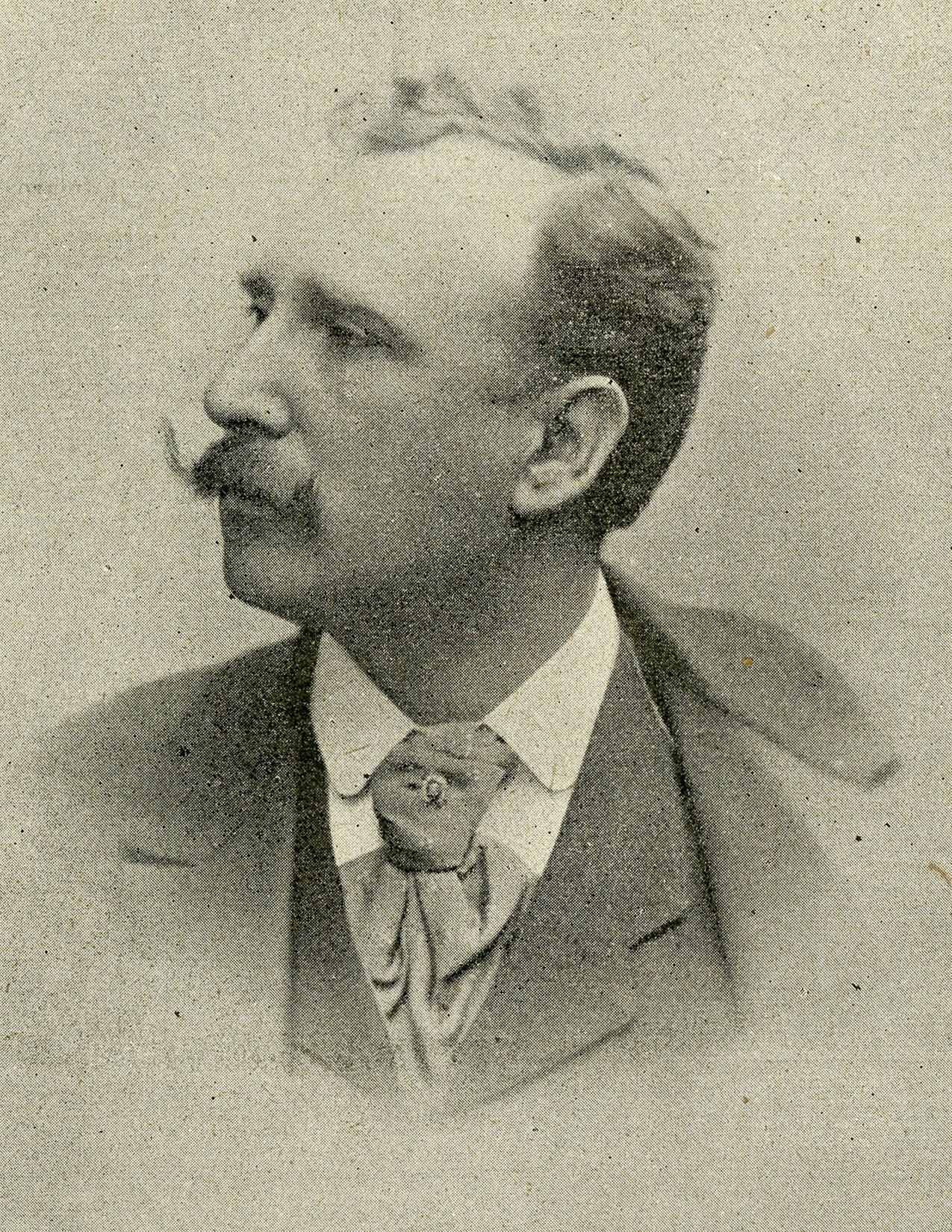
- Born: 11 April 1855; Palermo, Kingdom of the Two Sicilies
- Died: 20 December 1926 (aged 71); Rome, Italy
- Education: Palermo Academy of Fine Arts
- Known for: Sculpting

Signature
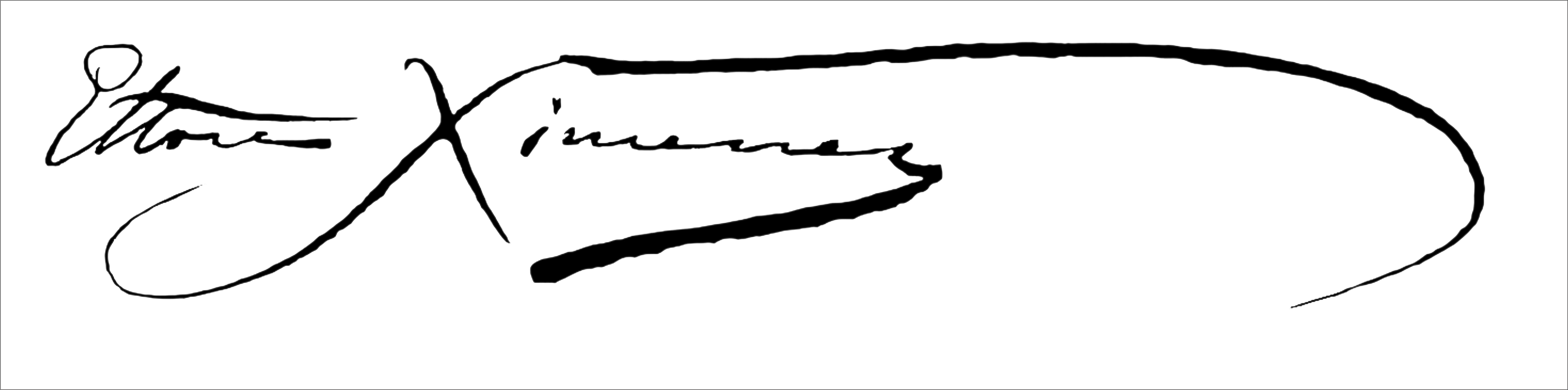

Ettore Ximenes (11 April 1855 – 20 December 1926) was an Italian sculptor.

== Biography ==
Ettore Ximenes was born 11 April 1855 in Palermo, Italy. Son of Antonio Ximenes and Giulia Tolentino, a Sicilian noble woman, Ettore Ximenes initially embarked on literary studies but then took up sculpture and attended the courses at the Palermo Academy of Fine Arts. After 1872, he continued training at the Naples Academy under Domenico Morelli and Stanislao Lista. He also established a close relationship with Vincenzo Gemito.

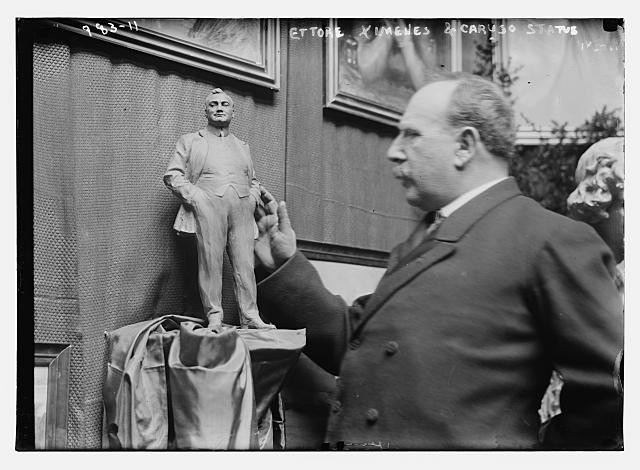
Ettore Ximenes with a sculpture model of opera singer Enrico Caruso.

He returned to Palermo in 1874 and won a competition for a four-year grant, which enabled him to study and open a studio for sculpture in Florence. In 1873 at Vienna, he exhibited Work without Genius. In 1877 at Naples, he exhibited a life-size statue titled The Equilibrium about a gymnast walking on a sphere. He would make copies of this work in small marble and bronze statuettes.

He exhibited a stucco Christ and the Adultress and Il cuore del re (Heart of the King), the latter depicting an oft-repeated story of King Vittorio Emanuele during one of his frequent hunts, encountering and offering charity to a peasant child. At the 1878 Paris World Exposition he displayed: The Brawl and il Marmiton. In Paris, he met with Auguste Rodin and Jean-Baptiste Carpeaux.

In 1878, he also completed a life-size stucco of il Ciceruacchio, a statue of the Italian patriot Angelo Brunetti and his thirteen-year-old son, depicting them at the moment of their execution in 1849 by Austrian troops. The Cicervacchio statue, with its tinge of revolutionary zeal, did not find commissions for completing the work in marble.

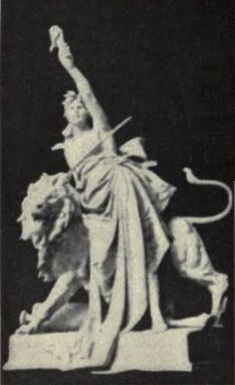
Sculpture of Revolution.

He then completed a nude statue of Nanà based on the novel by Émile Zola; the statue was exhibited at the Salon of 1879 in Paris. The next year at the Paris Salon, he displayed La Pesca meravigliosa, where a fisherman rescues a bathing maiden. Returning to Italy, he displayed the bust del minister Giuseppe Zanardelli. At the Mostra of Rome, he displayed The assassination of Julius Caesar; and at the Exposition of Venice, Ragazzi messi in fila. Ximenes' realism gave way to Symbolist and Neo-Renaissance elements. In addition to sculpture, he also produced illustrations for the works of Edmondo De Amicis published by the Treves publishing house.

Ximenes was involved in many of the major official monumental projects in Italy from the 1880s on and devoted his energies as from 1911 primarily to commissions for important public works in São Paulo, Kyiv, New York and Buenos Aires.

== Works ==
=== In Italy ===
- Bronze quadriga on Palace of Justice, Rome

=== In Moldova ===
- Monument to Emperor Alexander I of Russia in Chișinău (1914)
Alexander I of Russia, 1914

=== In Ukraine ===
- Monument to Emperor Alexander II of Russia in Kyiv (1911)
- Monument to Pyotr Stolypin in Kyiv (1913)
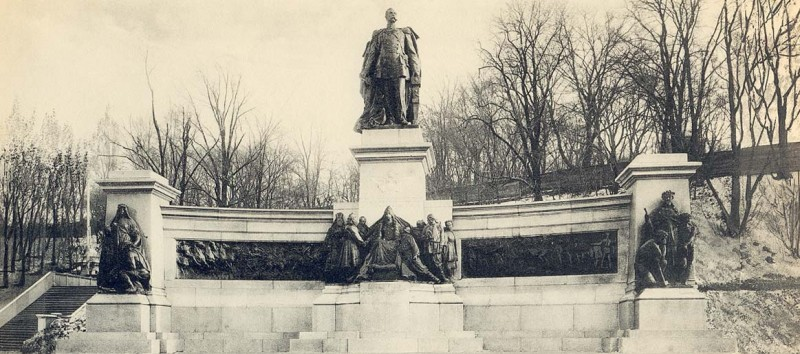
Alexander II of Russia, 1911

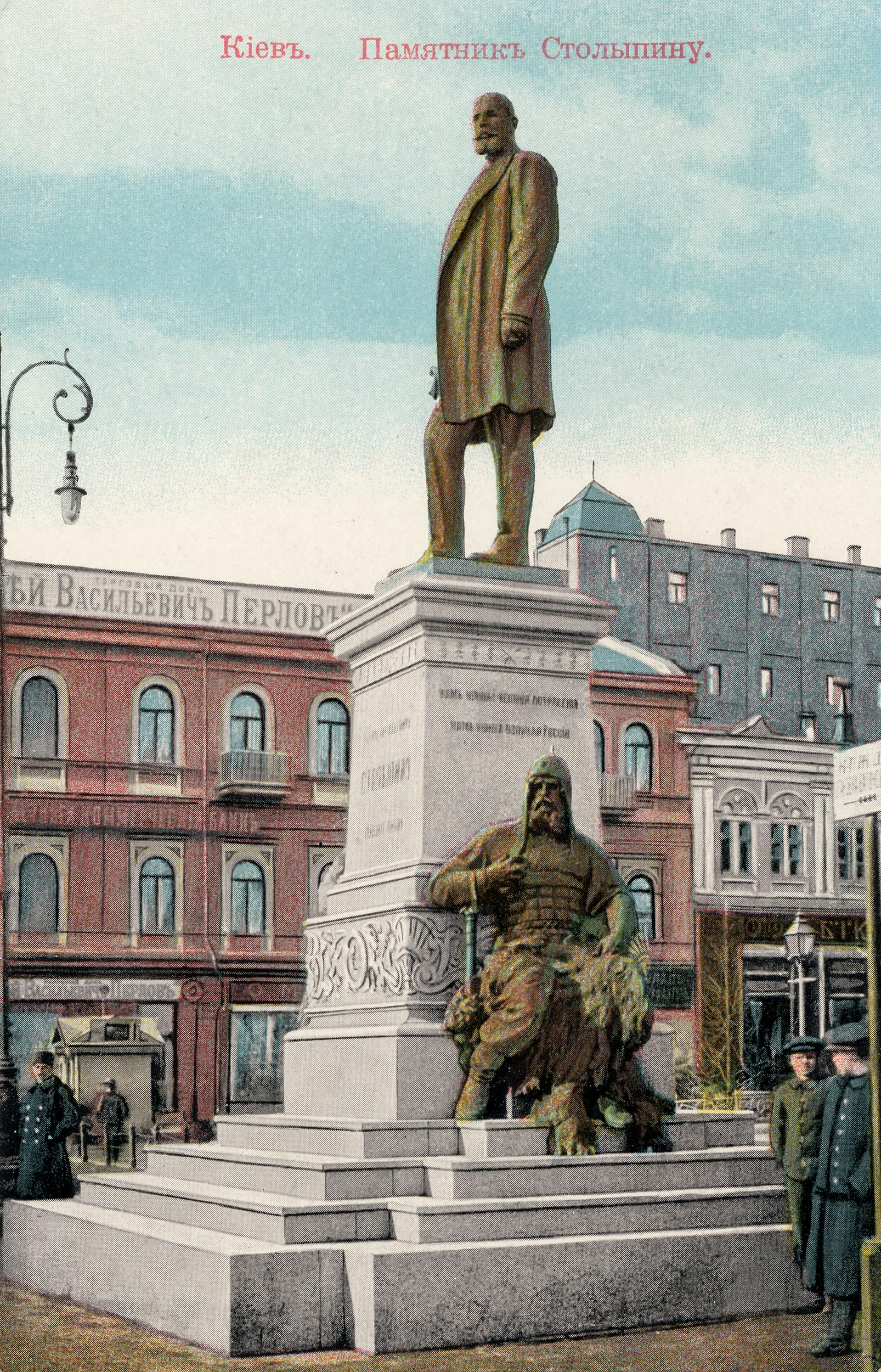
Pyotr Stolypin, 1913

=== In the United States ===
- Giovanni da Verrazzano in the Battery, Manhattan, New York, 1909
- Dante Alighieri in Dante Park at Lincoln Center, New York City and in Meridian Hill Park, Washington D.C. - castings of the same work, 1921
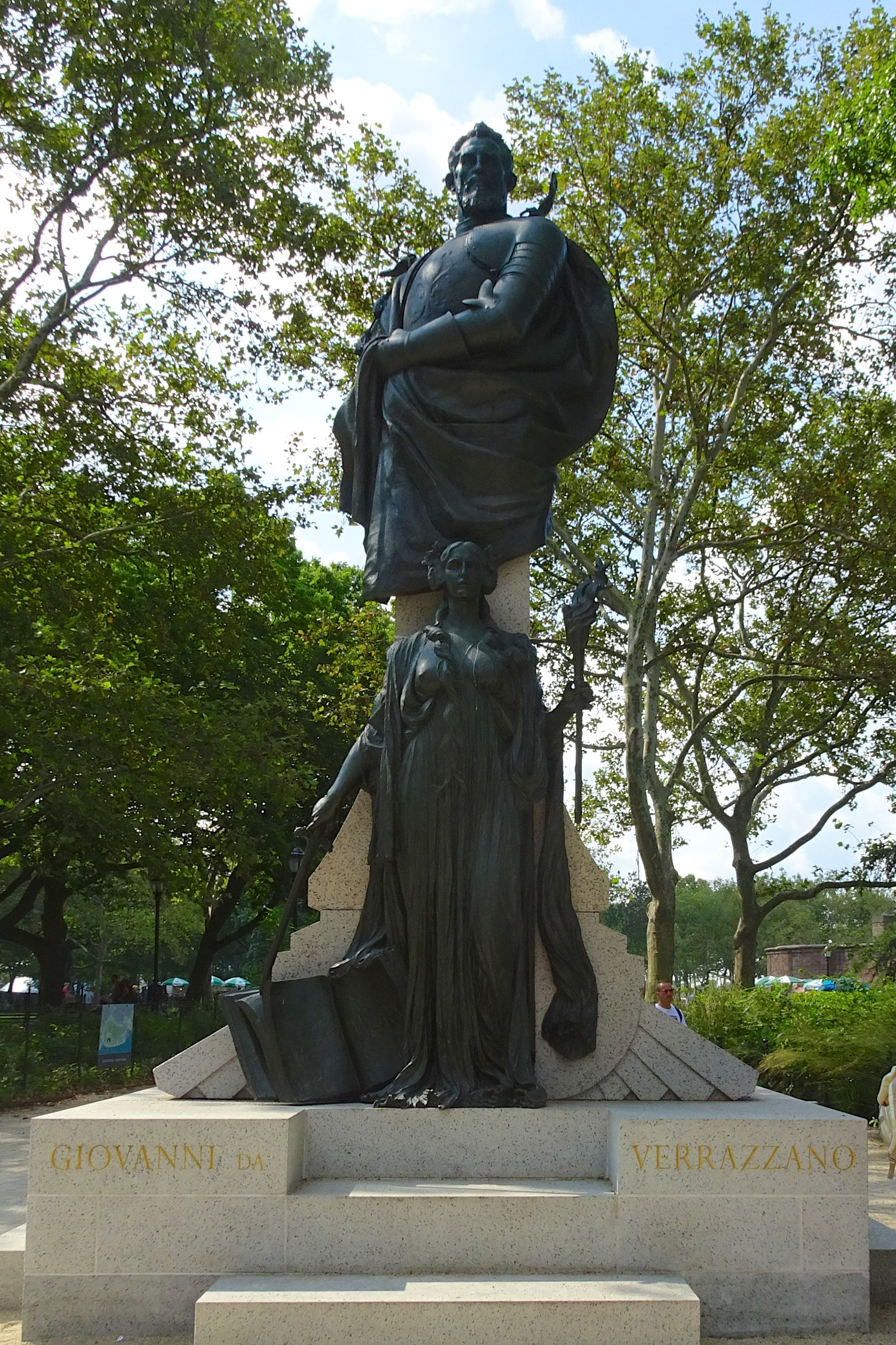
Verrazzano Monument, 1909

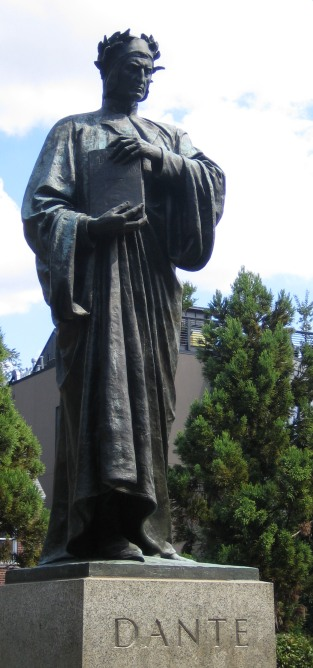
Dante Alighieri, Washington, D.C.'s Meridian Hill Park

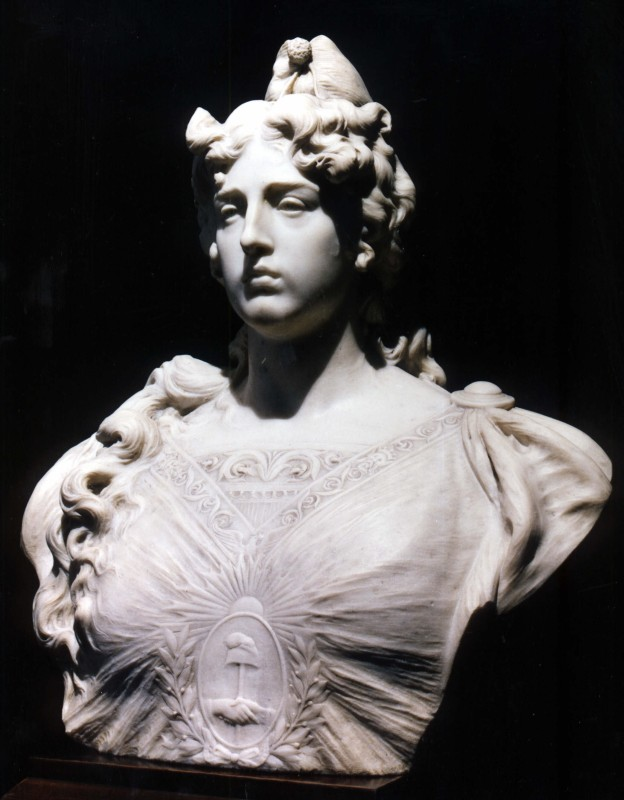
La repubblica Argentina, 1900

== Bibliography ==
- Elena Lissoni, Ettore Ximenes, online catalogue Artgate by Fondazione Cariplo, 2010, CC BY-SA (source for biography).
- Dianne Durante, Outdoor Monuments of Manhattan: A Historical Guide (New York University Press, 2007), with a discussion of the Verrazzano.
- Fried, Frederick & Edmund V. Gillon Jr., New York Civic Sculpture, Dover Publications, Inc., New York, 1976
- Goode, James M., The Outdoor Sculpture of Washington D.C., Smithsonian Institution Press, Washington D.C. 1974
- Lederer, Joseph & Arley Bondarin, All Around Town: A Walking Guide to Outdoor Sculpture in New York, Charles Scribner's Sons, New York, 1975
- Mackay, James,The Dictionary of Sculptors in Bronze, Antique Collectors Club, Woodbridge, Suffolk 1977
