= MVMT Watches =

Watch company in California, US

MVMT Watches Inc.
- Company type: Watches
- Founded: June 2013
- Headquarters: 5454 Beethoven Street, Los Angeles, California, U.S.
- Owner: Movado
- Website: www.mvmtwatches.com

MVMT Watches Inc. (pronounced "movement") (or simply MVMT) is an American watchmaker that sells quartz watches, as well as sunglasses and other accessories. The company was founded in June 2013 and was acquired by Movado in August 2018.

== Etymology ==
The word "MVMT" is a play-on-words, denoting both the movement of time and people, as well as the movement component of a watch.

== History ==
MVMT was co-founded in June 2013 by college dropouts Jake Kassan and Kramer LaPlante. They raised more than $290,000 for MVMT through two crowdfunding campaigns on Indiegogo.

MVMT started selling sunglasses in 2016 and was acquired by watchmaker Movado in August 2018 for over $100 million, possibly reaching $200 million depending on performance.

== Userbase and sales ==
According to MVMT, in 2017, 88% of their users were under 34 years old and 45% were under 24.

By December 2016, the company had sold over 600,000 watches and was estimated to have sold over 1 million watches by September 2018.
