= Nathan George Horwitt =

American industrial designer (1898–1990)

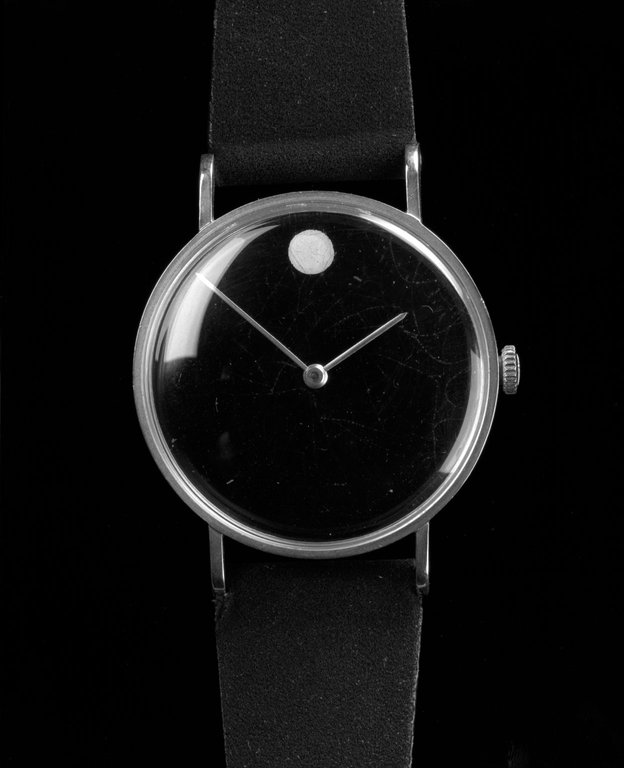
- Museum Watch designed by Nathan George Horwitt
- Born: 1898
- Died: 1990 (aged 91–92)
- Occupation: Designer

Nathan George Horwitt (c. 1898 – June 13, 1990) was an American industrial designer. He is most renowned for his Museum watch, which featured a black dial with a single silver circle situated at 12 o'clock. The Museum watch is part of the permanent collection of New York's Museum of Modern Art. The watch was intended to suggest a sundial, the most ancient form of keeping time.

== Biography ==
Horwitt was born c. 1898 in Russia and emigrated to the United States as a child, where he attended the City College of New York and New York University. He later attended the Art Students League of New York and served in the United States Army during World War I.

He was hired as an advertising copywriter by the pharmaceutical firm E. R. Squibb & Company (now part of Bristol-Myers Squibb). Horwitt was eventually promoted to become the firm's director of advertising.

The firm of Design Engineers in Manhattan was established by Horwitt in the late 1920s, a company that lasted for three years. After that he developed patents that could be sold to other manufacturers. In the 1960s and 1970s, Horwitt ran an organic farm in Berkshire County, Massachusetts.

=== Designs and patents ===
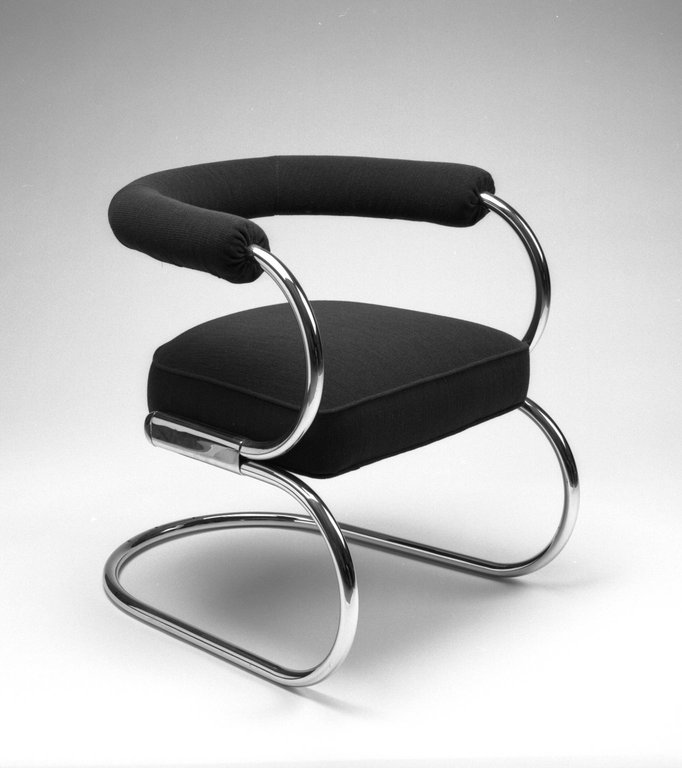
Nathan George Horwitt. "Beta" Chair, 1930 Brooklyn Museum

Among Horwitt's designs were the Beta chair, featured in the collection of the Brooklyn Museum. He held a total of 18 patents in the United States, including a frameless picture frame that he invented, which was intended to focus attention on the picture.

=== The Museum Watch ===
His best known design was for the "Museum Watch", which features a black dial without any numbers, symbols or lines to mark hours and minutes. The only mark on the watch was a single gold dot at the twelve o'clock position, intended to be evocative of a sun dial. The original Museum Watch, designed in 1947, manufactured by Vacheron & Constantin-Le Coultre Watches, Inc., Switzerland, was added to the permanent collection of the Museum of Modern Art in 1960.

Movado started producing an unauthorized version starting in 1948, copying Horwitt's design. Movado finally settled with Horwitt in 1975 with a payment of $29,000. Following Horwitt's death, Movado started heavy promotion of Horwitt and the design of the Museum Watch.

A wall clock of this design was created in the late 1960s for the Howard Miller Clock Company.

=== Honors and recognition ===
Horwitt supported the creation of the State of Israel, serving as a member of the board of the American League for a Free Palestine. For his efforts towards the establishment of the Jewish state, he was awarded the Jabotinsky Medal by Prime Minister of Israel Menachem Begin in 1980. Horwitt was rumored to have made his farm in Stockbridge, Massachusetts available for training exercises for the Jewish underground force, the Irgun, between 1945 and 1948.

=== Death ===
Horwitt died at age 92 on June 13, 1990, of natural causes at his home in Stockbridge, Massachusetts.
