= Ziaja (company) =

Polish cosmetics company

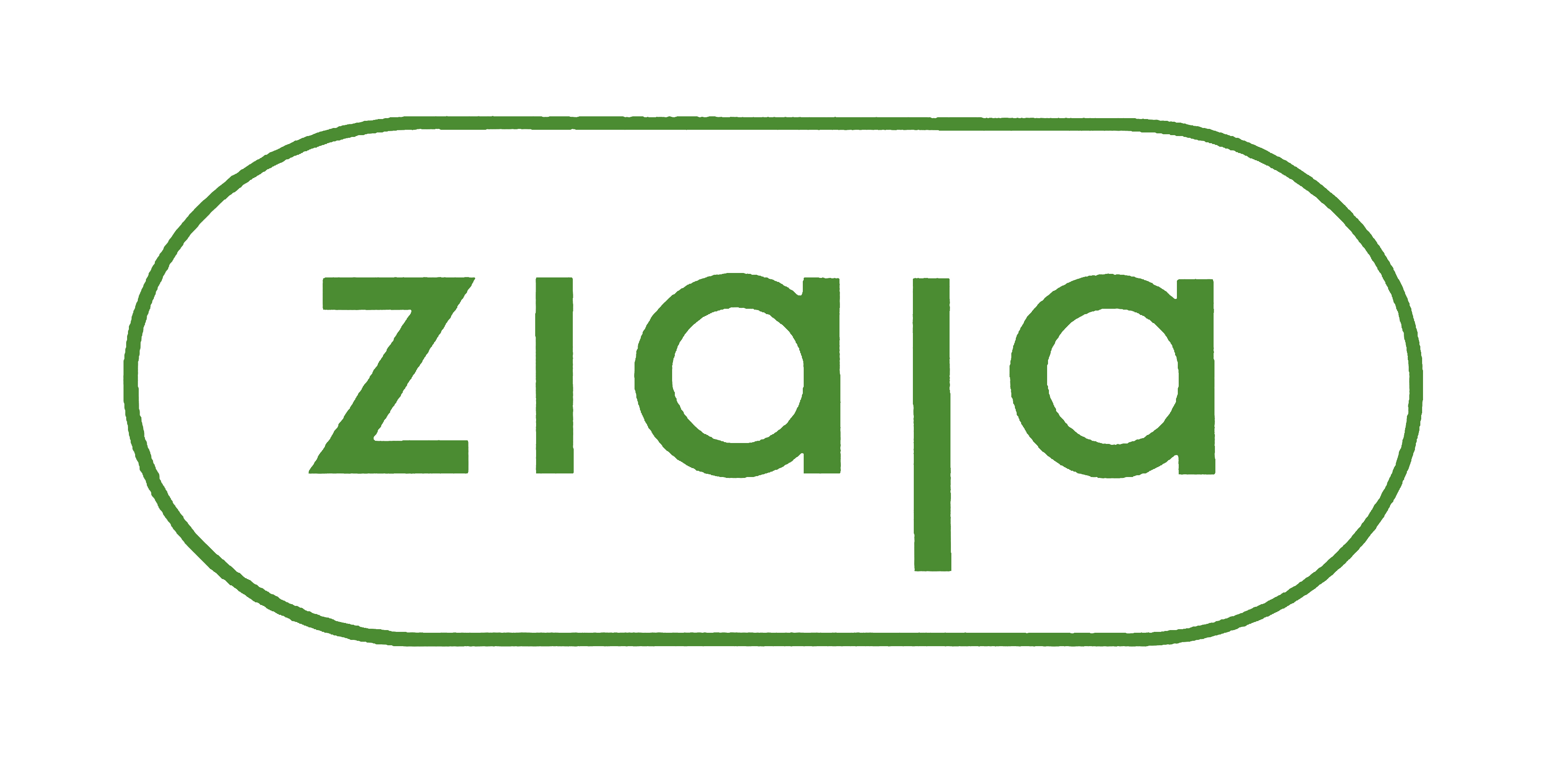
- The company's logo since 2023
- Industry: Cosmetics
- Founded: 1989; 36 years ago in Gdańsk, Poland
- Founder: Aleksandra Ziaja; Zenon Ziaja
- Headquarters: Gdańsk, Poland
- Area served: Poland, Czech Republic, Germany, Spain, Ireland, Hungary, Austria, Slovakia, United Kingdom, Bulgaria
- Number of employees: 588 (2024)
- Website: ziaja.com

Ziaja (Polish pronunciation: ['ʑa.ja]) is a Polish cosmetics company headquartered in Gdańsk. Founded in 1989 by Zenon Ziaja and his wife Aleksandra Ziaja, it is among the largest cosmetics companies in Poland.

== Statistics and products ==
In 2024, the company made a total profit of 99.97 million zł, a significant improvement over its numbers in 2023. That year, its number of employees averaged around 588. It has two main plants where it produces cosmetics, one in Gdańsk and one in Kolbudy, while they are distributed by three main means: firstly, at Ziaja dla Ciebie distribution locations in shopping malls, of which there are about 160 across Poland; in pharmacies, where 56% of the purchases of its products are made; and on its website.

As of 2025, the company operates in Poland, the Czech Republic, Germany, Spain, Ireland, Hungary, Austria, Slovakia, the United Kingdom, and Bulgaria. Aside from cosmetics, the company also produces pharmaceuticals.

== History ==
Ziaja was founded by two pharmacists, Zenon Ziaja and his wife Aleksandra Ziaja. Its first successful product was an inexpensive olive skin cream, which remains a major product for the company to this day. Over time, its range of products expanded to include various other skin creams, tonics, and balsams. Even by 2019, the company's growth was continuing, and aside from a decrease in sales during the COVID-19 pandemic in Poland, the growth has remained stable to this day.

Since its foundation, Ziaja has expanded to numerous countries. Their first locations in the Czech Republic and Slovakia opened in 2015. In December 2020, a scandal broke out when the company encouraged its workers without the approval of medical authorities to act as test patients for a COVID-19 vaccine, resulting in a major public backlash. Further statements deepened the scandal, which the company soon managed to recover from.
