= Movado =

American luxury watchmaker

Movado Group, Inc.
- Type: Public
- Traded as: NYSE: MOV; Russell 2000 component
- Founded: 1881; 145 years ago in La Chaux-de-Fonds, Switzerland
- Founders: Achille Ditesheim; Gedalio Grinberg (1983)
- Headquarters: Paramus, New Jersey, U.S.
- Key people: Efraim Grinberg (Chairman & CEO); Sallie A. DeMarsilis (CFO)
- Products: Watches
- Revenue: ▲US$752 million (2023)
- Operating income: ▲US$120 million (2023)
- Net income: ▲US$97 million (2023)
- Total assets: ▲US$788 million (2023)
- Total equity: ▲US$511 million (2023)
- Number of employees: 1,457 (2023)
- Website: MovadoGroup.com
- Footnotes; Financials as of January 31, 2023

Movado is a luxury American watch brand originally founded in 1881 in Switzerland. Movado means "movement" in Esperanto. The watches are known for their signature metallic dot at 12 o'clock and minimalist style; the company is best known for its Museum Watch.

Movado Group's brands include Movado, Concord, EBEL, Olivia Burton and MVMT, plus licensed brands Coach, Hugo Boss, Lacoste, Tommy Hilfiger and Calvin Klein. Movado previously manufactured other licensed brands and previously distributed Piaget.

== History ==
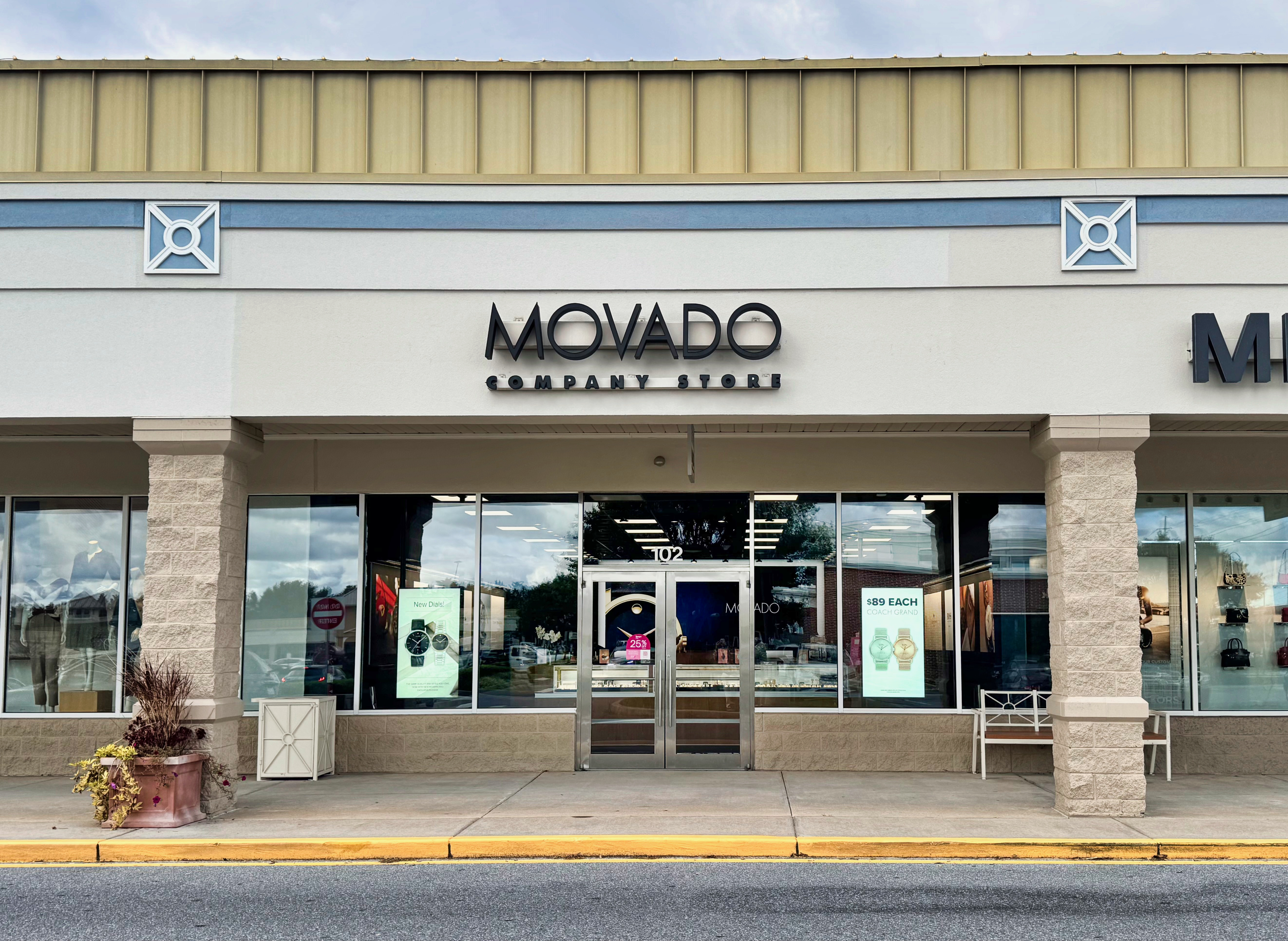
A Movado company store in Delaware

Achille Ditesheim founded the business In the watchmaking town of La Chaux-de-Fonds in 1881. The Ditesheim family, a Jewish watchmaker family, owned several companies in the area.

In 1892 Leopold, Achille, and Isidore combined their separate businesses to create "L.A. & I. Ditesheim, Fabricants." This was one of the first modern factories in the area following the watchmaking crisis of the 1870s. Having arrived over the course of the century, many Jewish traders, craftsmen and entrepreneurs were less attached to traditional working models, and thus played a major role in innovating the Swiss watch industry.

Within 20 years, the company had more than 80 employees and was internationally known for its wide variety of pocket watches. Movado began to produce wristwatches, and the company expanded again in 1905, now employing more than 150 workers. It was at this time that it was renamed Movado, which means "always in motion" in Esperanto.

In 1983, the company was purchased by North American Watch Corporation, founded by Gedalio Grinberg, a Cuban-born Jew who fled Fidel Castro's Marxist Revolution in 1960 with his family.

His son, Efraim Grinberg, is the chairman and chief executive officer of Movado Group, Inc. The North American President of Movado is Alan Chinich.

On February 23, 1999, Movado Group, Inc. completed the sale of Piaget's business to VLG North America, Inc., for approximately $30 million. In August 2018, Movado acquired watch startup MVMT, which was founded in 2013, for more than $100 million.

== Watches ==
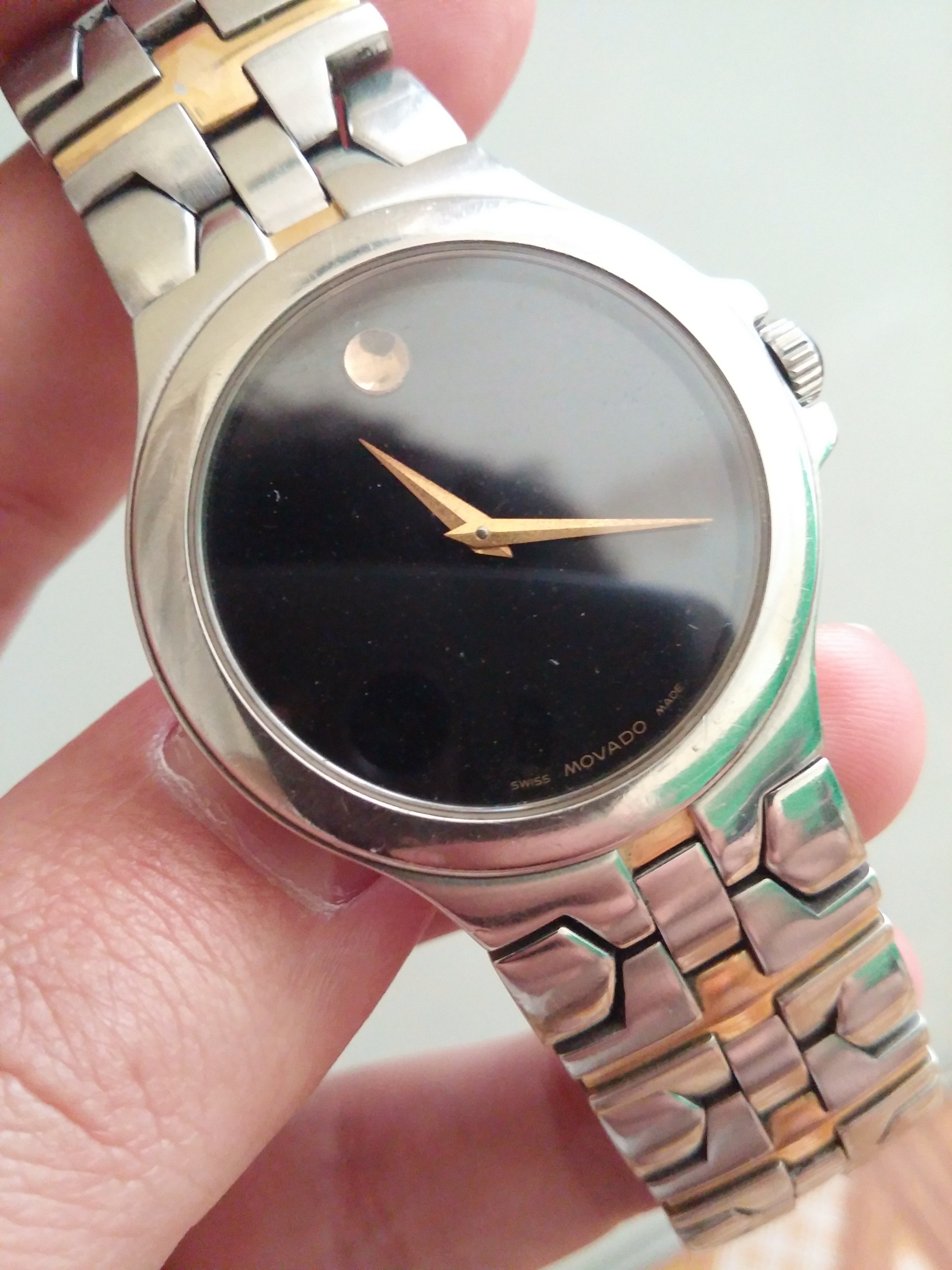
Movado Delphino Series, two-tone black dial-face

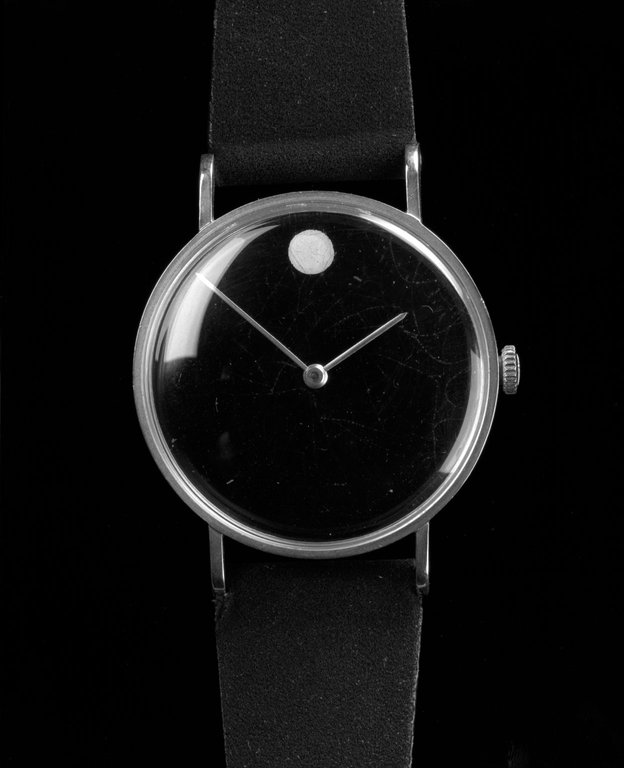
Original "Museum" Watch, designed by Nathan George Horwitt, ca. 1955. Brooklyn Museum

=== Museum Watch ===
The company markets the Museum Watch, designed by the American designer Nathan George Horwitt in 1947. Influenced by Bauhaus, the watch dial has a very simple design defined by a solitary dot at 12, symbolizing the sun at high noon. It was first made by an American importer of Swiss watches called "Vacheron & Constantin-LeCoultre Watches Inc." (not the Swiss watchmaker Vacheron Constantin), and later produced by Movado. Horwitt's dial was selected for the permanent design collection of the Museum of Modern Art, New York, in 1960, the first watch dial to receive this distinction. Movado finally settled with Horwitt in 1975 with a payment of US$29,000 (equivalent to $174,000 in 2025). Following Horwitt's death, Movado started heavy promotion of Horwitt and the design of the Museum Watch. Photographer Edward Steichen called Horwitt's design "the only truly original and beautiful one for such an object". The single-dot dial now appears in many of Movado's timepieces.

=== Other Watches ===
Some Movado watch models have names in Esperanto, a constructed language, such as Bela ("beautiful"), Belamodo ("beautiful fashion"), Fiero ("pride"), Brila ("brilliant"), Linio ("line"), and Verto ("head top").

In November 2015, Movado announced the release of the Movado Motion collection of fine Swiss-made watches, powered by the Manufacture Modules Technologies (MMT) MotionX technology platform. The collection includes the women's Bellina and the men's Museum Sport models.

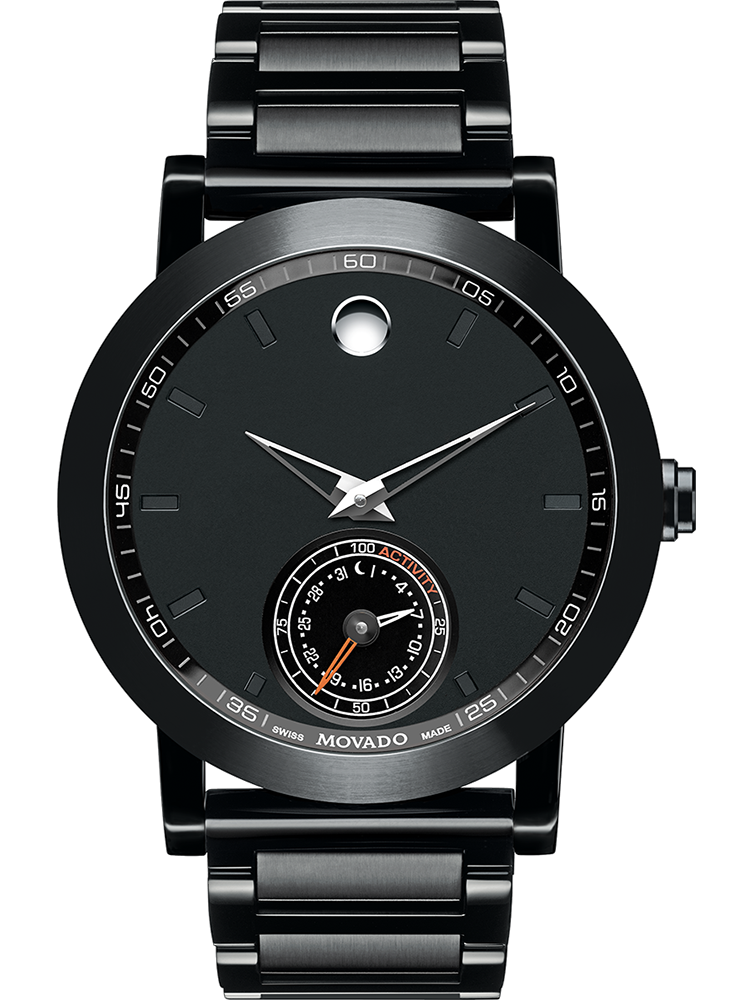
Movado Museum Sport Motion Smartwatch powered by MotionX

== Sculpture ==
Movado commissioned Time Sculpture by architect Philip Johnson. The bronze sculpture with granite base, located outside Lincoln Center in New York City, was dedicated on May 19, 1999.

== See also ==
- Movado Ermeto watch
